= Excellent Cuisine =

Chinese restaurant in Portland, Oregon, U.S.

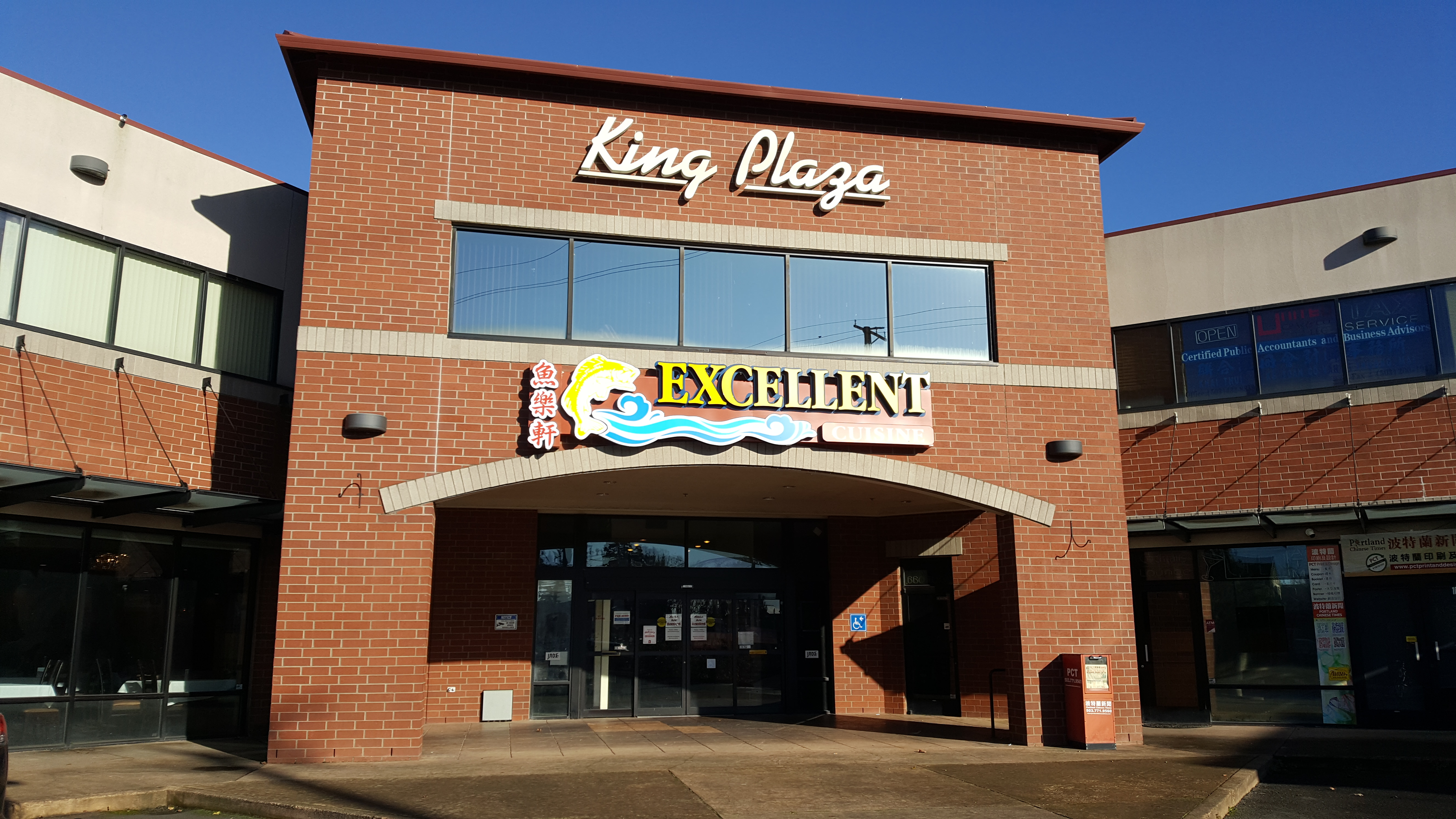
- The restaurant's exterior, 2020
- Interactive map of Excellent Cuisine

Restaurant information
- Food type: Chinese
- Location: 8733 Southeast Division Street, Portland, Multnomah, Oregon, 97266, United States
- Coordinates: 45.5050°N 122.5729°W
- Website: excellentcuisine-or.com

Excellent Cuisine is a Chinese restaurant in Portland, Oregon. Established in late 2020, the restaurant operates in a strip mall in the southeast Portland part of the Montavilla neighborhood, in the space that previously housed Wong's King. Excellent Cuisine serves dim sum and other Chinese cuisine such as har gow, rice noodle rolls, and shumai, egg tarts, pineapple buns, and sesame balls. The restaurant has received a positive reception.

== Description ==
The Chinese restaurant Excellent Cuisine operates in the King Plaza strip mall on Division Street, in the southeast Portland part of the Montavilla neighborhood, serving dim sum and other Chinese cuisine. The menu has included ham sui gok (deep-fried dumplings with minced pork and scallion), har gow, red shrimp rice rolls, rice noodle rolls, and shumai.

The restaurant has also served fried squab and salt-and-pepper squid, Peking duck, braised fish head in a clay pot, and glutinous rice. Dessert options include coconut pudding, egg tarts, oatmeal-stuffed buns, pineapple buns, and sesame balls.

== History ==
Excellent Cuisine opened in late 2020, in the space that previously occupied Wong's King, which closed during the COVID-19 pandemic. Excellent Cuisine has operated on Christmas.

== Reception ==
In 2022, Katherine Chew Hamilton of Portland Monthly wrote:

Excellent Cuisine might not be a perfect dim sum spot, but it's serving solid versions of classics and pushing the envelope with more modern dishes. And how can you say that dim sum culture in Portland is nonexistent, when Excellent Cuisine was packed by 11 a.m.? It just operates on its own laid-back schedule, like the rest of town.

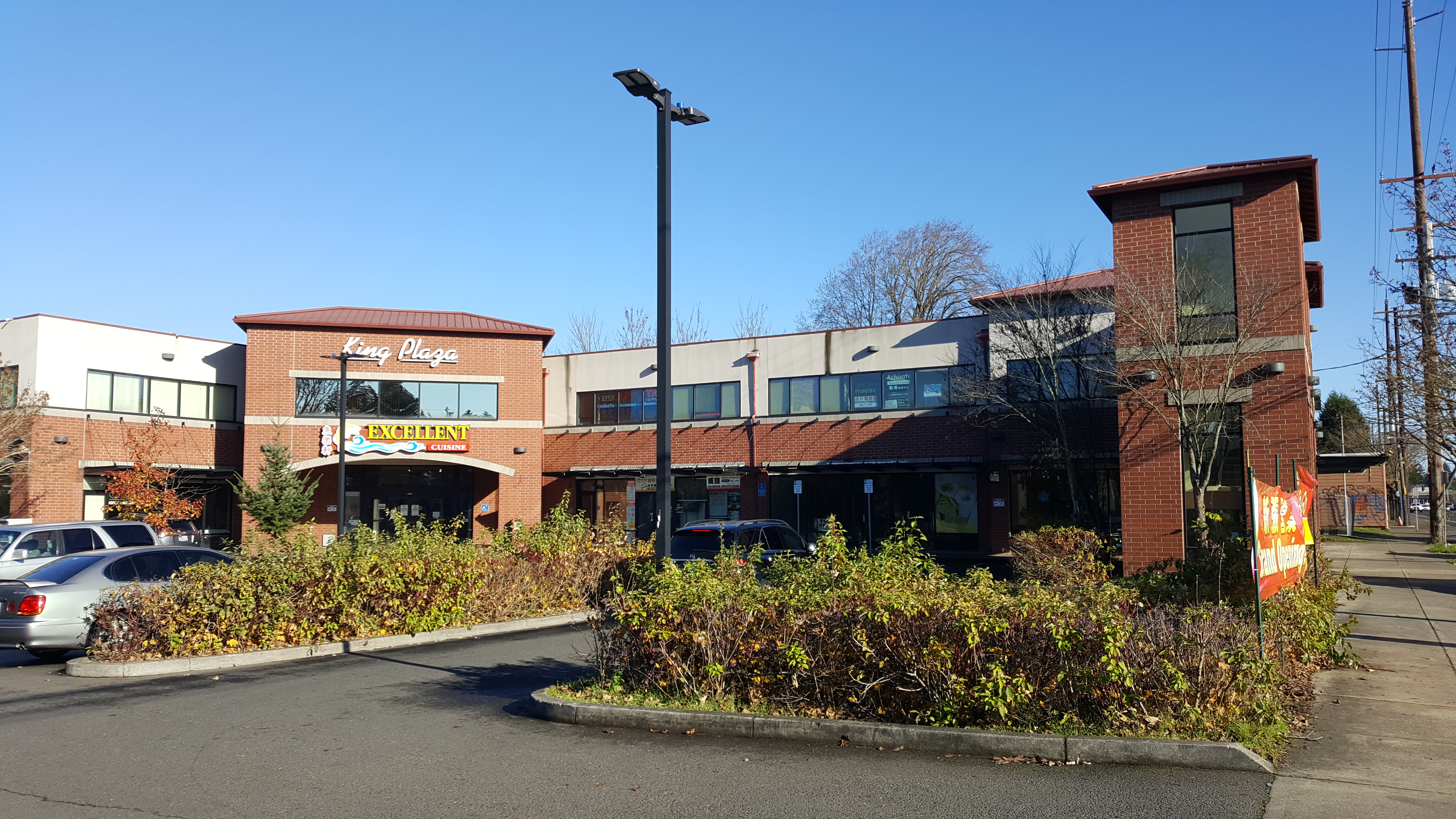
King Plaza in 2020

In the magazine's 2022 overview of the city's best Chinese food, she said Excellent Cuisine "excels at both dim sum standards and newfangled dishes". She recommended the ha gow, siu mai, coconut pudding rabbits, and red rice noodle rolls, which she called "a delight of textures and flavors worth a visit on its own", but advised avoiding the oatmeal-stuffed bun and the salted egg yolk bun. Hamilton said of the rice noodle rolls: "while the classic version ... is forgettable verging on bad (the soy sauce is far too sweet), the red rice version breaks new ground in the dim sum world". She recommended dipping the rolls in hoisin or soy sauce.

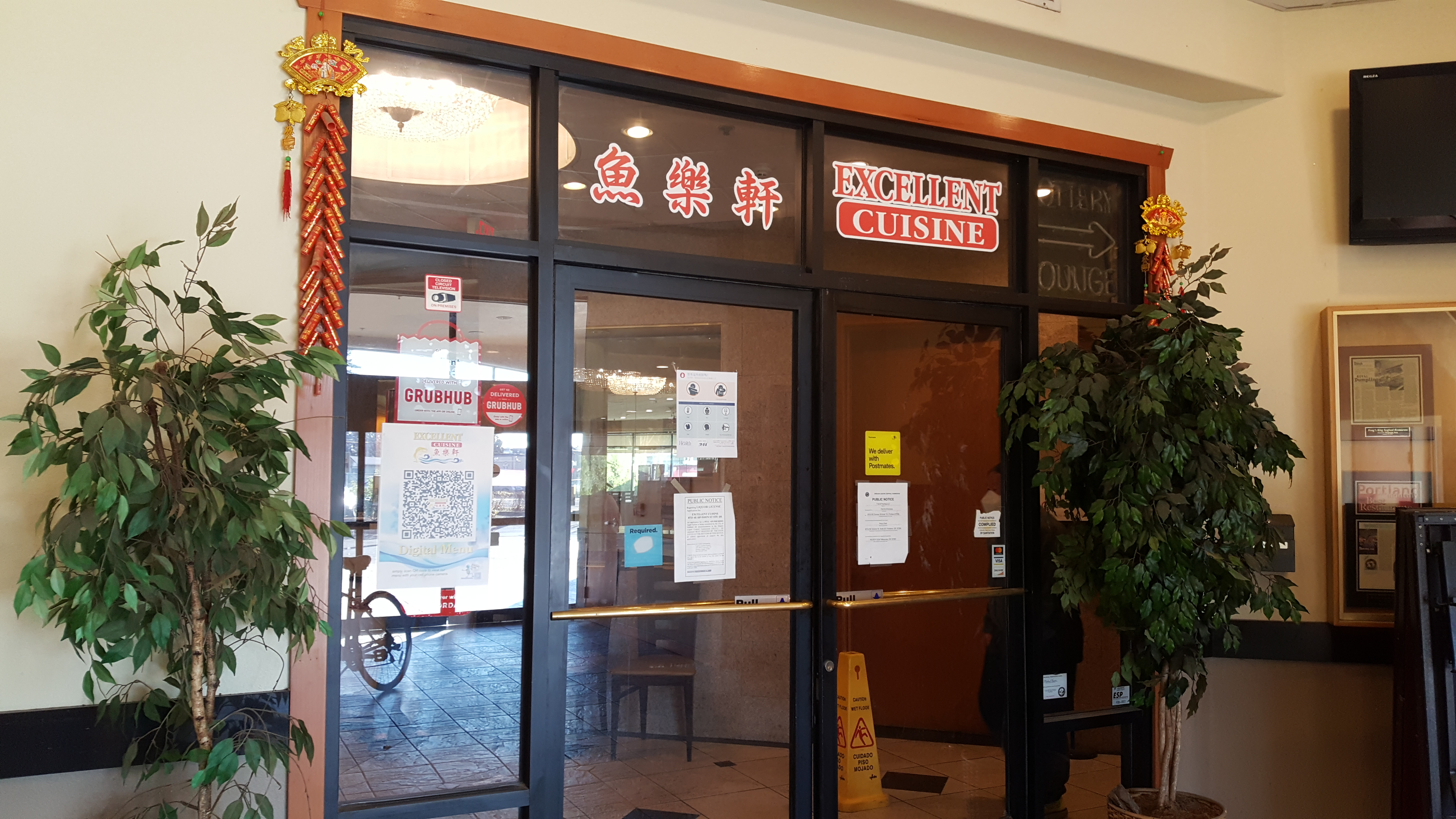
The interior entrance in 2020

In Eater Portland's 2023 list of sixteen restaurants for "delectable" dumplings in the metropolitan area, Thom Hilton and Seiji Nanbu called Excellent Cuisine "the hotspot for dim sum in Portland right now", with food "executed with aplomb" and "some fun options ... that are a little harder to find at other dim sum shops". In the website's 2023 overview of "outstanding" Chinese cuisine in the area, Nanbu and Janey Wong wrote: "The name of this dim sum spot ... gets the point across: Excellent Cuisine's handmade, piping hot dumplings and buns are exactly as described... Beyond its dim sum, Excellent Cuisine's larger menu is full of gems." In 2023, Wong recommended Excellent Cuisine for a Christmas dining experience. Eater Portland's 2024 list of 38 "essential" eateries in the city said dim sum "is at a caliber that may supersede its predecessor". Brooke Jackson-Glidden recommend the restaurant in her 2024 "Eater's Guide" to the city. She and Michelle Lopez also included Excellent Cuisine in a 2024 overview of Portland's best restaurants for special occasions.

== See also ==
- History of Chinese Americans in Portland, Oregon
- List of Chinese restaurants
