= Batagor =

Sundanese dish from Indonesia

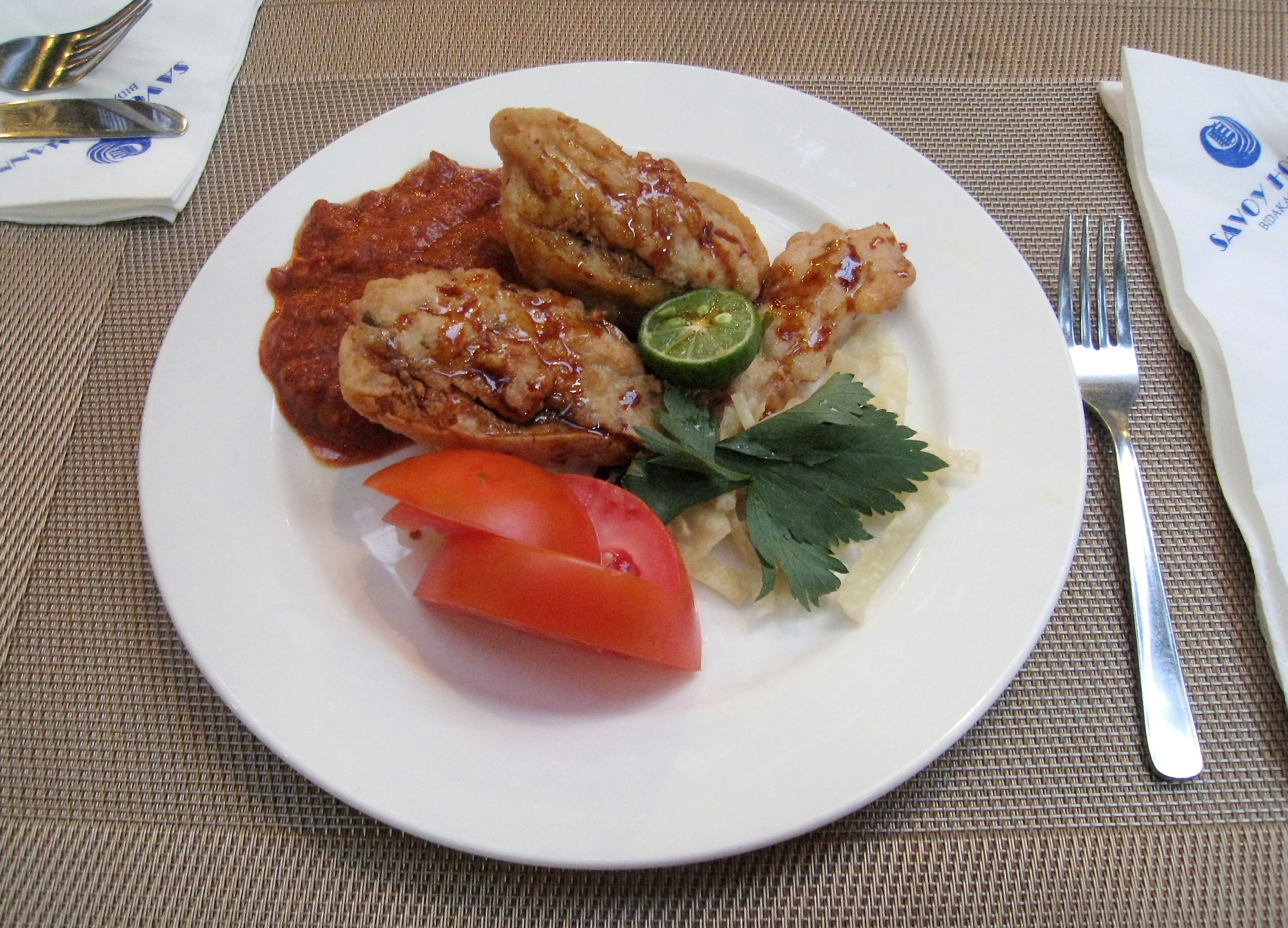
- Batagor, as served in an upper-class hotel
- Course: Snack
- Place of origin: Indonesia
- Region or state: West Java
- Serving temperature: Hot
- Main ingredients: Fried fish dumpling with tofu and vegetables in peanut sauce
- Variations: Siomay, shumai

Batagor (abbreviated from baso tahu goréng, 'fried bakso [and] tofu') is a Sundanese dish from Indonesia, and popular in Southeast Asia, consisting of fried fish dumplings, usually served with peanut sauce. It is traditionally made from minced tenggiri (Spanish mackerel), although other types of seafood such as tuna, mackerel, and prawn may also be used. The fish paste is subsequently stuffed into wonton skins or filled into tofu, and then deep-fried in palm oil.

Street-side batagor fried dumplings are usually served with fried tofu and finger-shaped fried otak-otak fish cakes. These batagor components are cut into bite-size pieces and topped with peanut sauce, kecap manis (sweet soy sauce), sambal (chili paste), and lime juice. As a fried food, batagor generally has a crispy and crunchy texture. Since their serving methods are identical, batagor and siomay are often sold by the same vendor, with batagor being offered as a crispy variation of siomay.

== History and origin ==
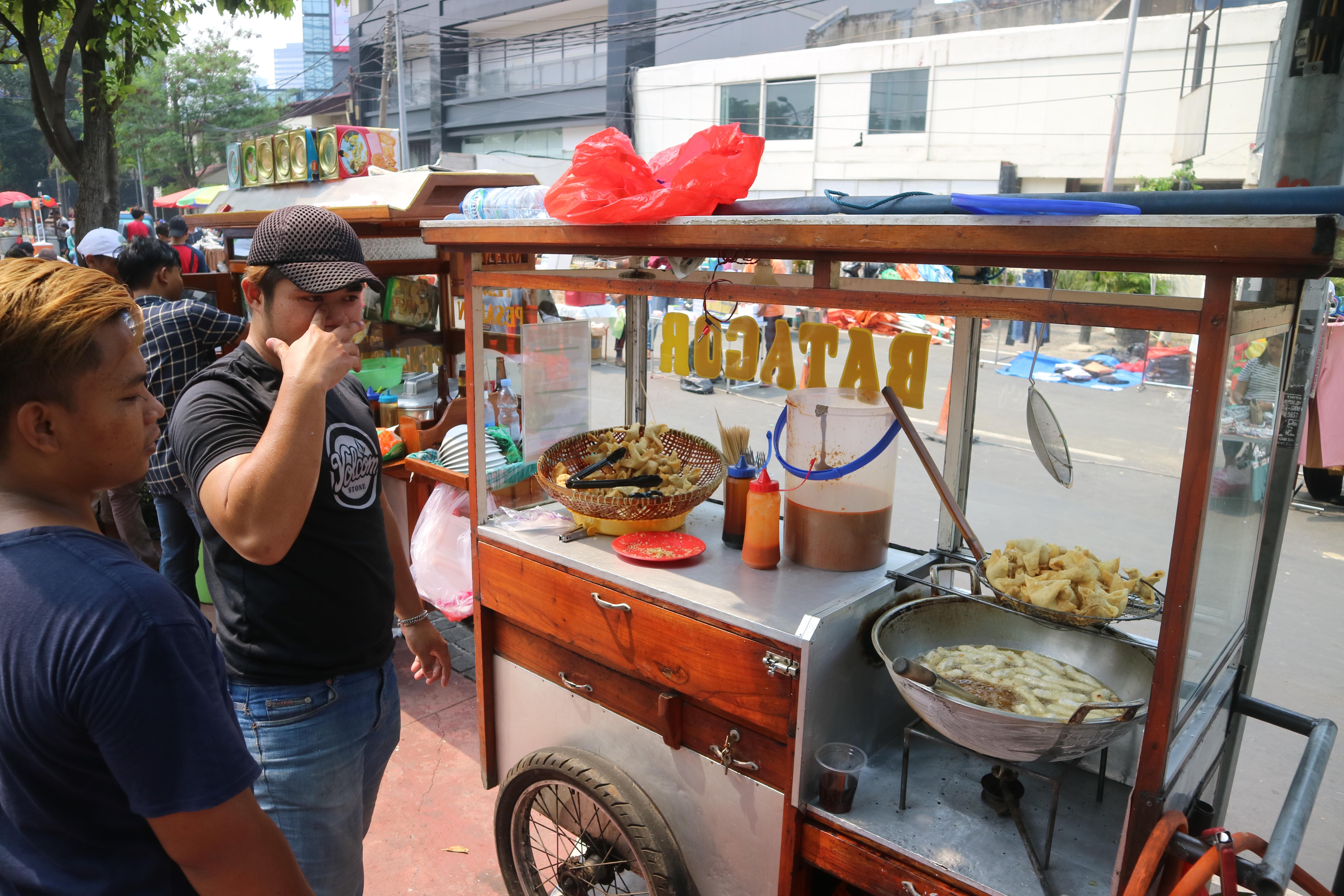
The street vendor is deep-frying batagor in a cart during car-free day in Jakarta.

Batagor is ubiquitous in Indonesian cities and can be found in street-side food stalls, travelling carts, bicycle vendors, and restaurants. However, it is most strongly associated with the West Java city of Bandung. The dish is influenced by Chinese Indonesian cuisine, and might be derived from siomay, with the main difference being that batagor is fried instead of steamed. It has been readily adapted into local Sundanese cuisine, and today, most batagor sellers are Sundanese.

Batagor began appearing in various Indonesian cities throughout the country in the 1980s and was first made in 1968 in Bandung by a migrant from Purwokerto named Haji Isan. Thus, it is said that the origin of batagor is a modification of an extinct fried food from Purwokerto. Batagor is characterized like other Purwokerto specialties which are mostly fried and served with peanut sauce, such as kampel (fried ketupat). According to legend, batagor was created as a way to salvage unsold bakso meatballs. It is said that one day the bakso did not sell well, and a seller was stuck with too many leftovers. To cut his losses, he then came up with the idea to grind the meatballs, stuff them into tofu, deep-fry them, and serve them with peanut sauce in a fashion similar to siomay or ngo hiang. This created a new dish of bakso tahu goreng ("fried bakso [and] tofu"), abbreviated as "batagor".

== Varieties ==
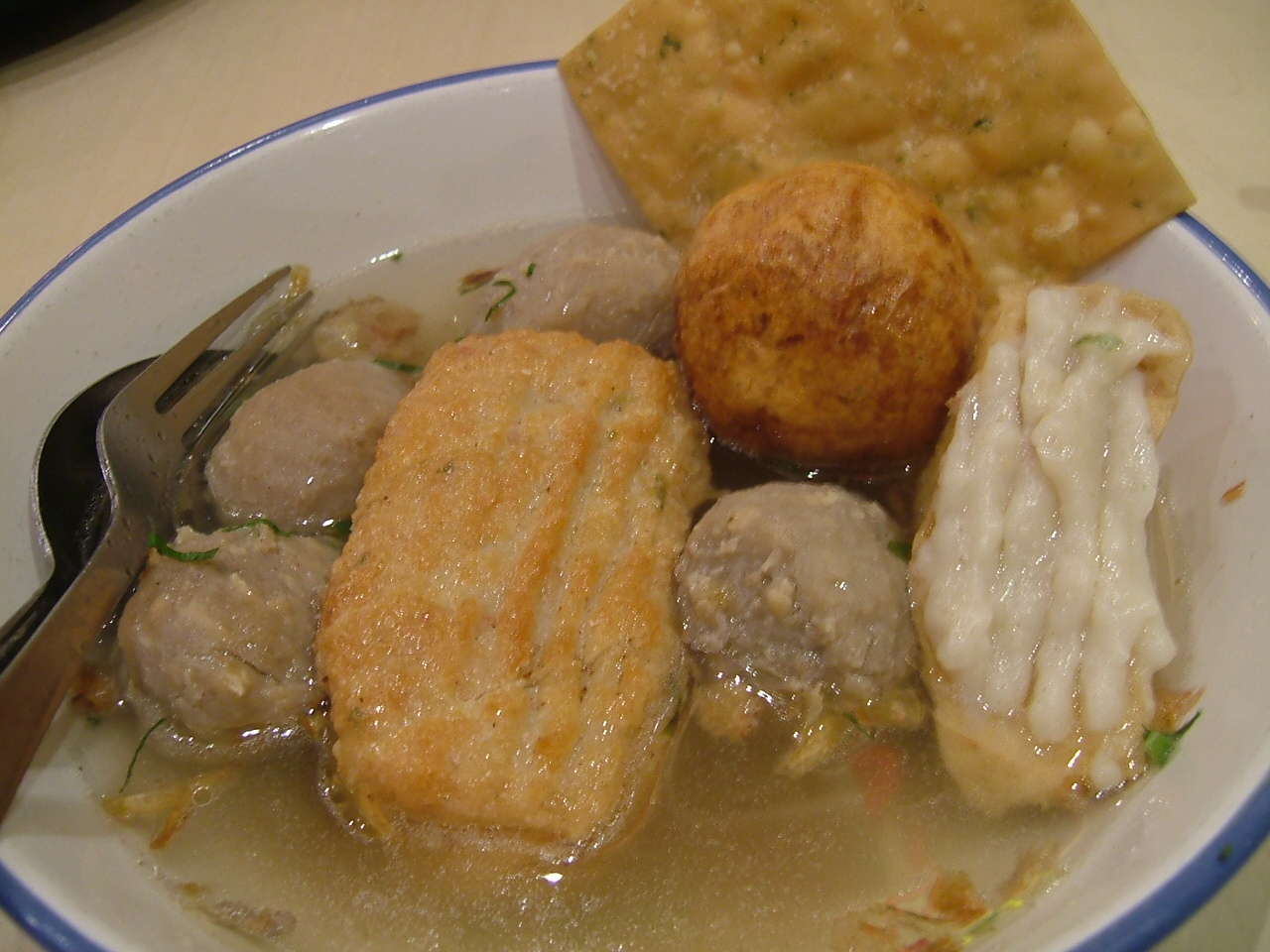
Batagor kuah, which is similar to bakso Malang

Batagor is traditionally served with peanut sauce, although in Bandung, most batagor sellers also offer a variation served in clear broth known as batagor kuah ("batagor soup"). The soup consists of a clear chicken broth with the addition of various ingredients such as pepper, sugar, salt, leek, and celery. Chili sauce, tomato sauce, and lime can also be added to add more flavor to the soup.

Batagor is popular for its savory flavor, crispy texture of its deep-fried wonton skin and tofu, and sweet and savoury peanut sauce. As of 2018, batagor is often sold at around 10,000 Indonesian rupiahs per portion at modest street-side vendors.

== See also ==
- Dim sum
- Shumai
