= Wong's King =

Defunct chain of Chinese restaurants in Oregon, U.S.

Wong's King Seafood Restaurant

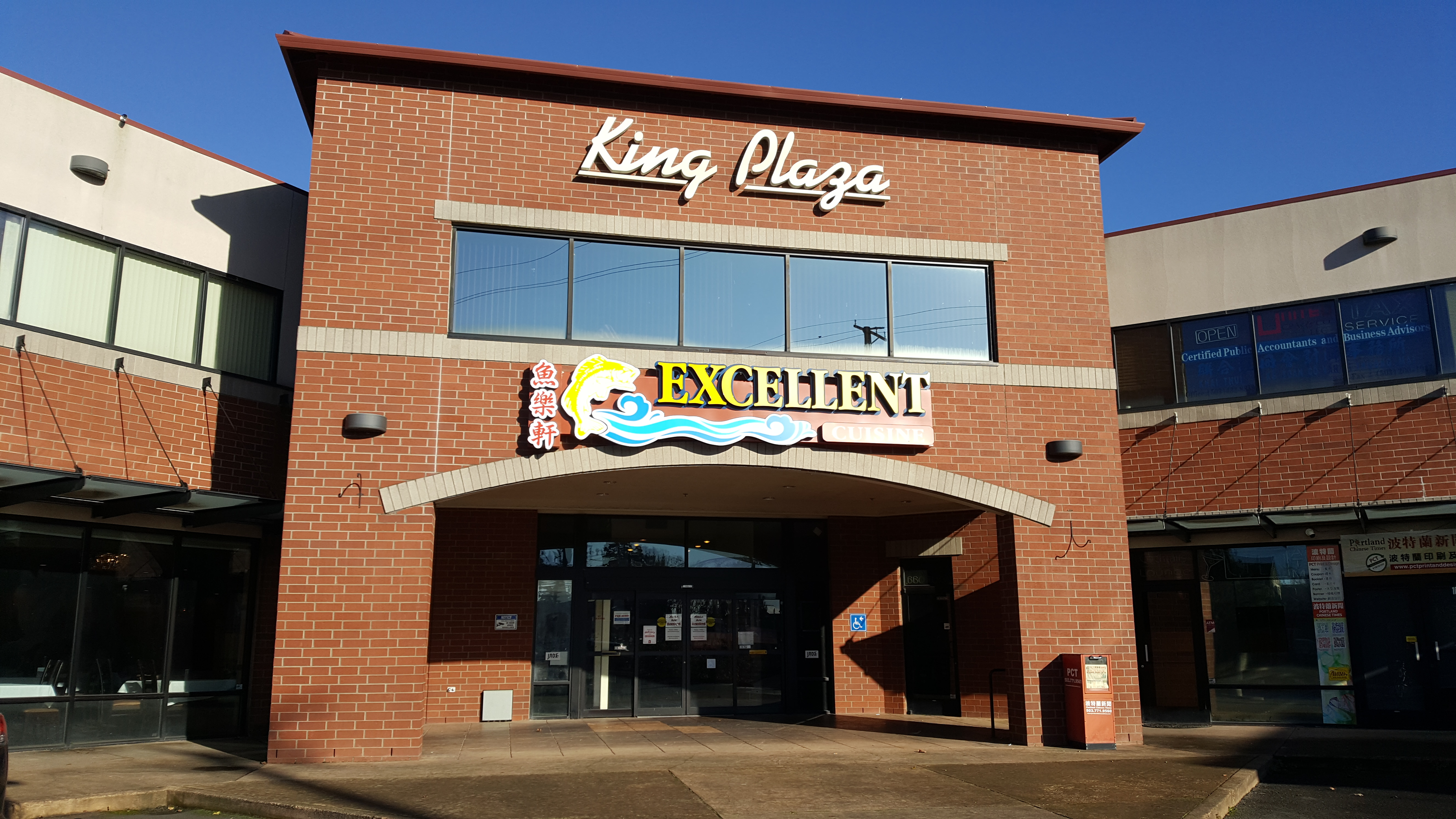
- Wong's King was housed in King Plaza, pictured in November 2020 after the restaurant closed
- Interactive map of Wong's King Seafood Restaurant

Restaurant information
- Established: 2004
- Closed: May 2020
- Food type: Chinese (Cantonese); seafood
- Location: 8733 Southeast Division, Portland, Multnomah, Oregon, 97266, United States
- Coordinates: 45.50504°N 122.57301°W
- Other locations: Beaverton; Estacada; Sandy

Wong's King Seafood Restaurant (or simply Wong's King) was a chain of Chinese/Cantonese and seafood restaurants in the metropolitan area of Portland, Oregon, United States. In addition to the original restaurant in Southeast Portland, the business operated in Beaverton, Estacada, and Sandy, and specialized in dim sum.

Wong's King was established in 2004 and garnered a positive reception. In 2009, Martin Yan named the restaurant as one of ten "great places to welcome prosperity", and it was included in CNN's 2017 list of the 50 best Chinese restaurants in the U.S. In 2018, the Beaverton restaurant was rebranded as Lychee Asian Bistro and Noodle House. Wong's King closed in 2020 during the COVID-19 pandemic.

== Description ==
Wong's King was a chain of Chinese/Cantonese and seafood restaurants. The original restaurant was located in the strip mall King Plaza on Division Street in the southeast Portland section of the Montavilla neighborhood, and had a large dining room. The chain's other restaurants were in Beaverton, Estacada, and Sandy. The menu featured dim sum and included chicken feet, congee, crab, dumplings, har gow, noodles, Peking duck, pork barbecued ribs, pork buns, pot stickers, rice cakes, beef rice-noodle rolls and spring rolls, tofu, turnip cakes, and wontons.

According to Robin Goldstein, "the family name that's transliterated as 'Wong' is pronounced the same way as the Cantonese word for 'king,' so the restaurant's name is actually a kind of arrogant pun. You might translate it as 'King's King.' Add to this the fact that it's in 'King Plaza,' and you're approaching real delusions of grandeur—the sorts of delusions that sometimes lead restaurants to raise prices and let service slip."

== History ==
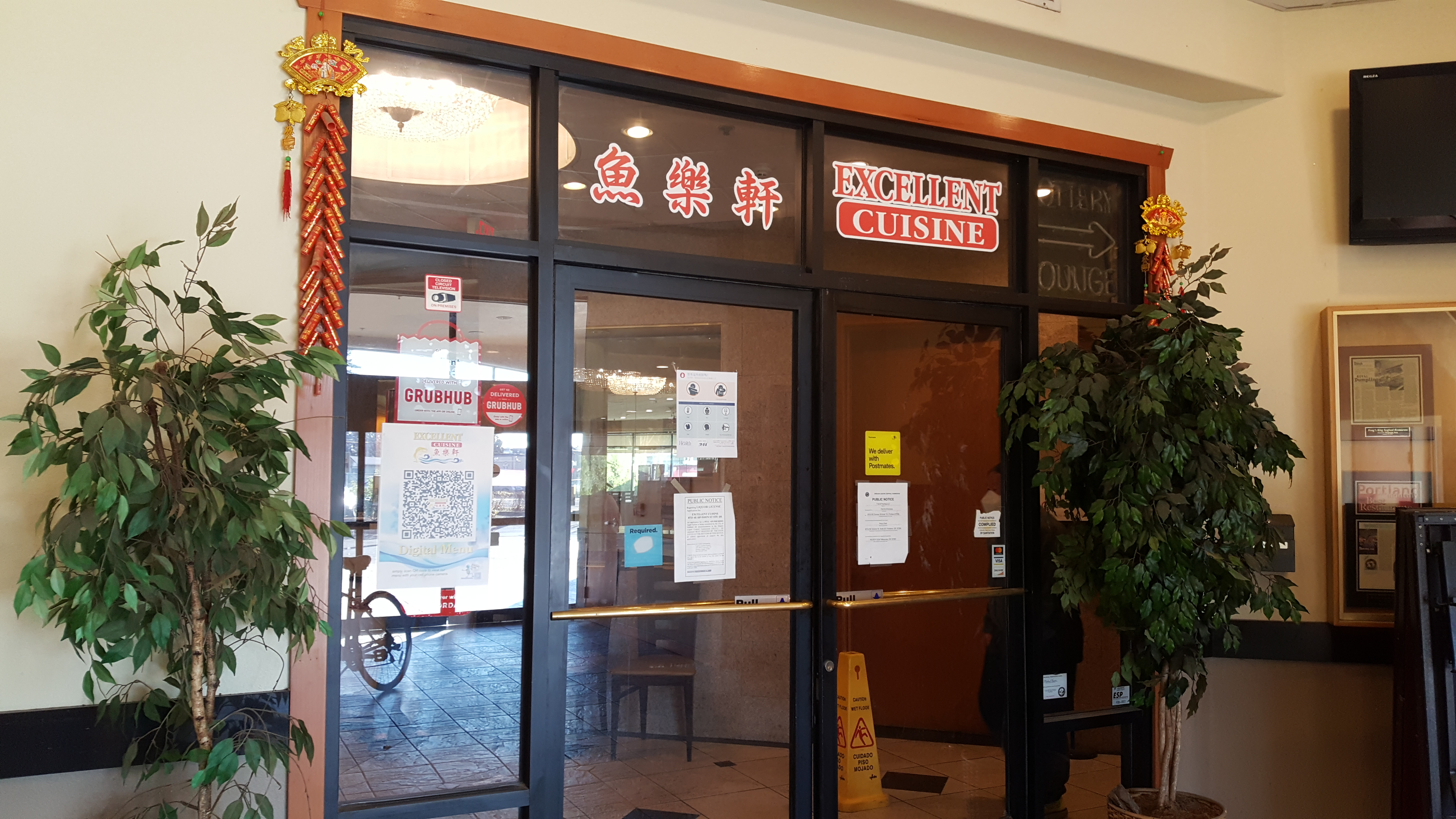
Entrance to Excellent Cuisine inside King Plaza, which previously housed Wong's King, 2020

Wong's King was established in 2004. According to Michael Russell of The Oregonian, "The restaurant was born out of a small chain of American-style Chinese restaurants with locations in Sandy, Gresham and Southeast Portland, and was 'bankrolled by untold thousands of orders of kung pao chicken,' according to a 2005 review from The Oregonian, which called Wong's King Seafood a 'new benchmark for the city'." The Estacada restaurant opened in 1998.

Russell wrote, "The restaurant got an early boost before it opened, when Andy and Fulai Wong won gold medals at the Fifth China International Cooking Contest in China, a competition featuring chefs from 18 different countries." Wong's King has been described as a rival to the defunct Ocean City Seafood Restaurant. Employees of Wong's King marched in the first Avenue of Roses parade in 2007.

In September 2011, the Beaverton restaurant was rebranded as Lychee Asian Bistro and Noodle House. Ownership did not change but the restaurant's new menu focused on noodle and rice dishes instead of dim sum. Lychee Asian Bistro was replaced by the restaurant Spicy World. In 2018, Wong's King hosted The Asian Reporter Foundation's 20th annual scholarship and awards banquet.

Wong's King closed in 2020 during the COVID-19 pandemic. The business had received a $10,000 city-sponsored relief grant but filed for bankruptcy. Jamie Goldberg of The Oregonian noted some of the restaurant's employees "struggled to overcome language barriers when navigating Oregon's dysfunctional unemployment benefits system". Excellent Cuisine replaced the Portland restaurant.

== Reception ==
In 2005, Grant Butler of The Oregonian wrote:

At last, Portland gets a temple to Cantonese cuisine with the arrival of this large Chinese restaurant. From beginning to end, a meal here can be a voyage of discovery. Focus on the menu's page of chef's recommendations, and you see the kitchen's range. Also check out the daily dim sum, with bargain-priced delicacies – and huge crowds on weekends.

Butler said in 2007:

A bit farther from the city's core, there's terrific dim sum as well as an array of Cantonese delicacies from chef Fu Lai Wong at Wong's King Seafood Restaurant. This is the sort of mammoth restaurant you find in Vancouver, B.C., or Hong Kong. You understand why the dining room is full when the first dishes arrive: Portland has never had cooking quite like this."

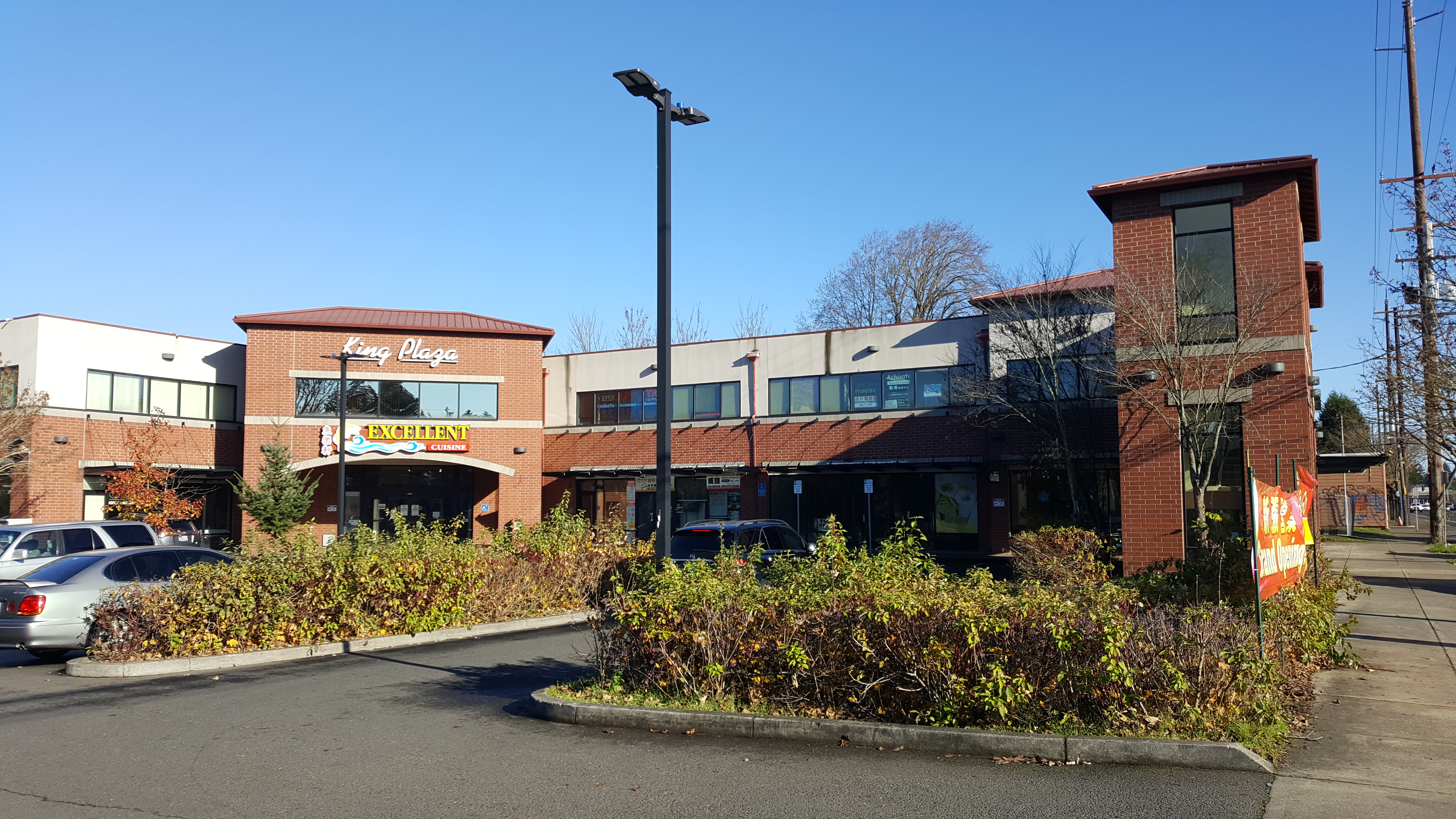
King Plaza in November 2020

In 2013, The Oregonian's Michael Russell wrote, "The best [steamed BBQ pork buns] I've had in the Portland area ... are the ones at Southeast Portland's Wong's King Seafood, with tender barbecued pork in a sweet soy and oyster sauce". The same newspaper's Mike Rogoway said Wong's King was among "Portland's best-known and most-loved restaurants" in 2012. In 2022, Zane Sparling said the restaurant "rewrote the map for Chinese food in Portland". Kathy Baruffi included Wong's King in USA Today's 2009 list of 10 "great places to welcome prosperity", as recommended by Martin Yan.

Chinese Restaurant News named Wong's King the third-best Chinese restaurant in the U.S. in 2010. The business was one of ten recipients of the Overall Excellence Award at the magazine's sixth annual Top 100 Chinese Restaurants in the USA Awards, which were presented at The Venetian Las Vegas. Clarissa Wei ranked Wong's King number 37 in CNN's 2017 list of the 50 best Chinese restaurants in the U.S. and said:

Wong's is an authentic dim sum joint in an Asian strip mall where you can get the whole carts-piled-with-steamed-buns-and-dumplings experience ... Despite the long lines, servers are friendly, the food emotes pure Hong Kong goodness and there's no rushing you out the door, an unfortunate practice in too many popular dim sum places. The pork shu mai and steamed buns are customer favorites."

Wong's King was named runner-up in the Best Chinese Restaurant category in Willamette Week's annual readers poll in 2007. The newspaper included Wong's King in a 2014 list of "our 100 favorite restaurants in Portland". Drew Tyson included Wong's King in Thrillist's 2014 "guide to Portland's 6 best dim sum spots" and said the business was "probably Portland's most popular Chinese restaurant". The website's Kashann Kilson recommended Wong's King for a "truly authentic dim-sum experience" in 2018. Eater Portland included Wong King's spicy crab in a 2013 list of "the nine must-try Asian dishes on SE 82nd Avenue". In 2022, the same website's Seiji Nanbu and Brooke Jackson-Glidden called Wong's King a "Portland dim sum legend".

== See also ==
- COVID-19 pandemic in Portland, Oregon
- History of Chinese Americans in Portland, Oregon
- Impact of the COVID-19 pandemic on the restaurant industry in the United States
- List of Chinese restaurants
- List of seafood restaurants
