= Siomay =

Indonesian steamed fish dumpling

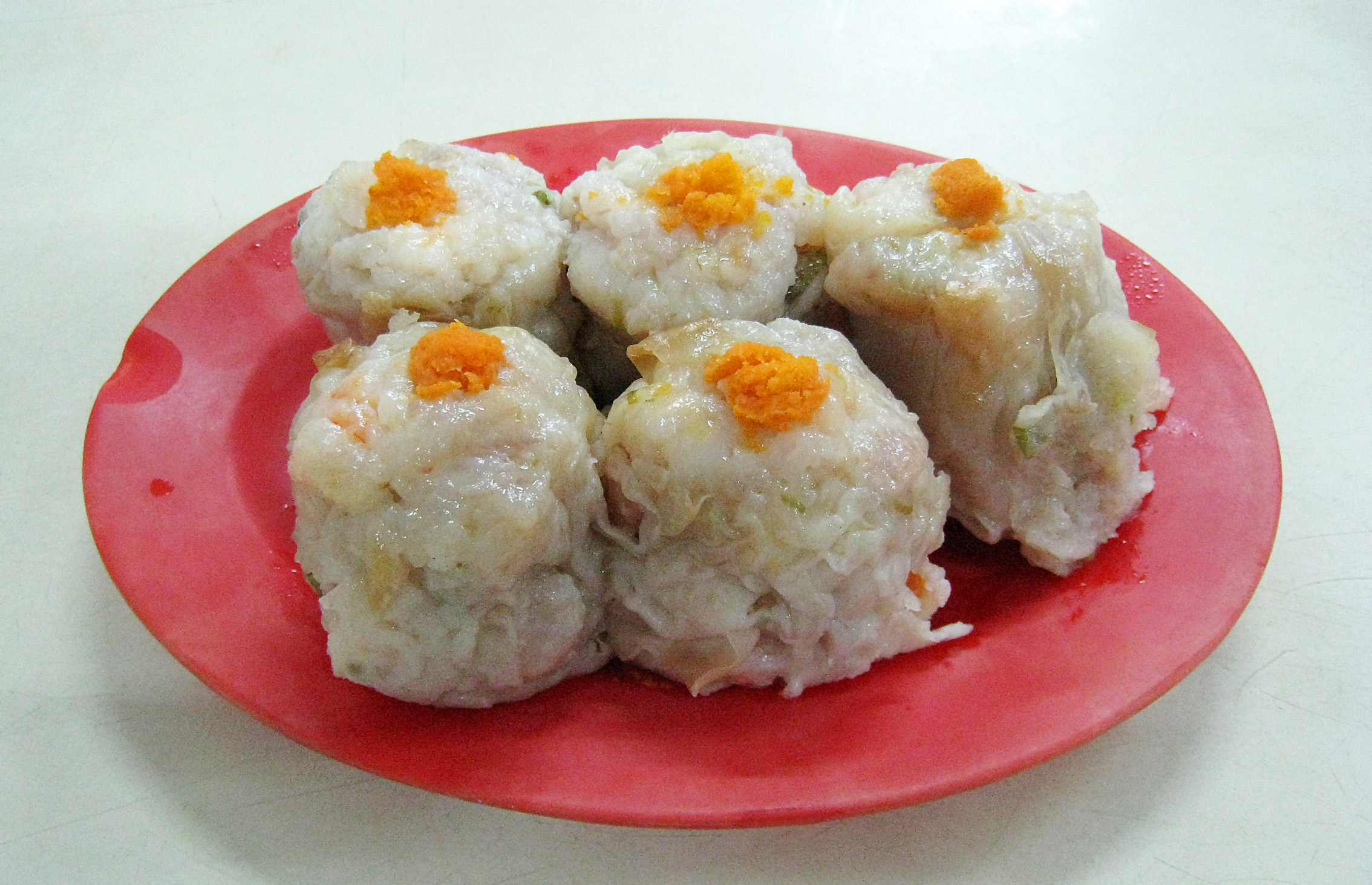
- Chinese Indonesian shrimp siomay in Glodok area, Jakarta
- Alternative names: Somay
- Course: Snack
- Place of origin: Indonesia, China
- Region or state: West Java, Nationwide
- Serving temperature: Hot
- Main ingredients: Fish dumpling with tofu and vegetables in peanut sauce
- Variations: Batagor, shumai

Siomay (also somai) (Chinese: 燒賣; pinyin: shāo mài; Pe̍h-ōe-jī: sio-māi) is a Chinese-Indonesian steamed fish dumpling with vegetables served in peanut sauce. It is derived from the Chinese shumai. It is considered a light meal, similar to the Chinese dim sum. It is traditionally made from pork but is frequently substituted with tenggiri (Spanish mackerel), as many Indonesians observe the halal dietary law. Sometimes other types of seafood such as tuna, mackerel, and prawn or poultry such as chicken also can be used to make siomay. Other complements to siomay include steamed cabbage, potatoes, bitter gourd, boiled egg, and tofu. Siomay is often cut into bite-size pieces and topped with peanut sauce, sweet soy sauce, chili sauce, and a dash of lime juice.

== Origin and varieties ==
Siomay is ubiquitous in Indonesian cities; it is one of the most popular snacks or light meals in Indonesia. It can be found in street-side food stalls, travelling carts, bicycle vendors, and restaurants, and is considered a popular school meal for Indonesian students.

Just like bakso, lumpia, and pempek, siomay was influenced by Chinese Indonesian cuisine. However, Chinese Indonesian siomay is rarely served with peanut sauce; it is instead served with a sweet-sour and spicy chili sauce in its place, or with no sauce at all, resembling authentic Chinese shumai.

Siomay has long been incorporated into Indonesian cuisine, the most famous iteration of the dish being Bandung-style siomay (siomay Bandung). It has been adapted into local Sundanese cuisine, where most siomay sellers today are Sundanese. It has similarly been adapted into the batagor, short for bakso tahu goreng, another variety of the dish also from Bandung; it is similar to siomay, except that it is fried instead of steamed.

== Gallery ==
Siomay

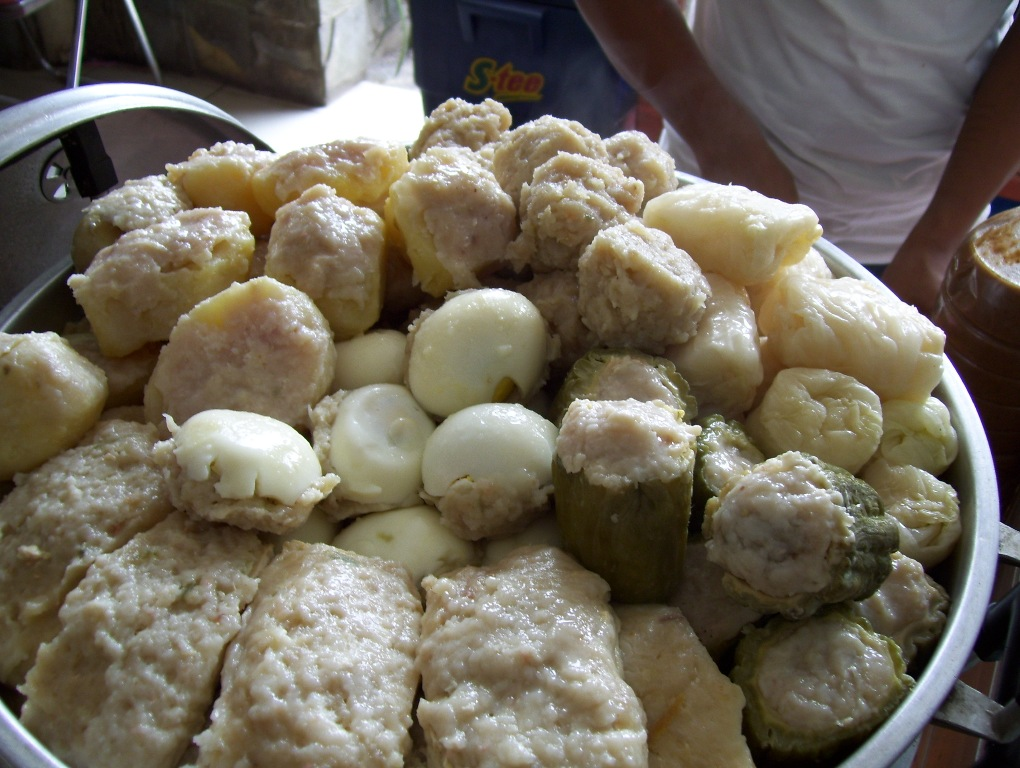
Varieties of steamed siomay: tofu, potato, cabbage, bitter gourd, and egg

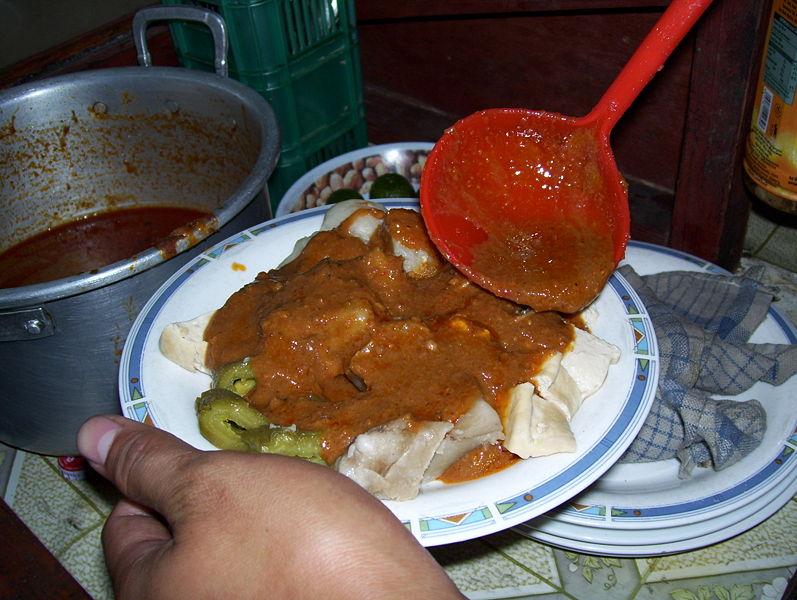
Sliced siomay poured with peanut sauce

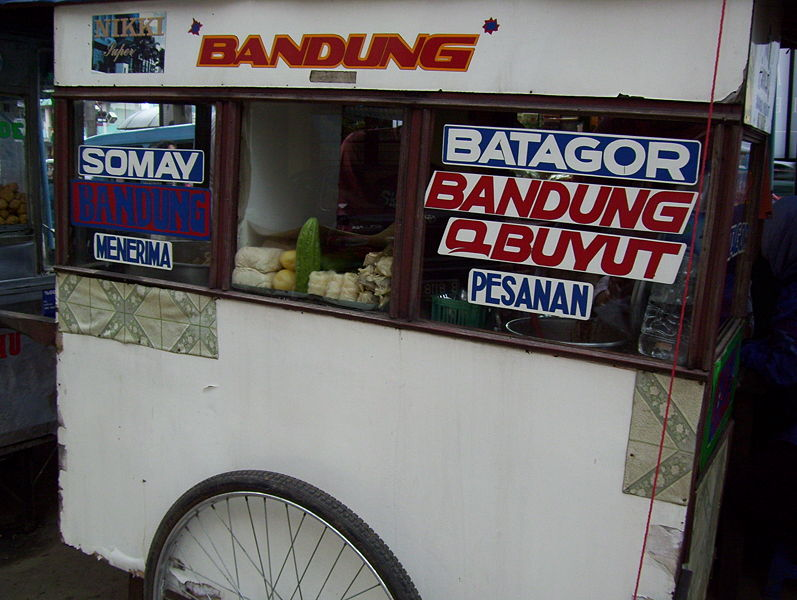
Siomay and batagor cart

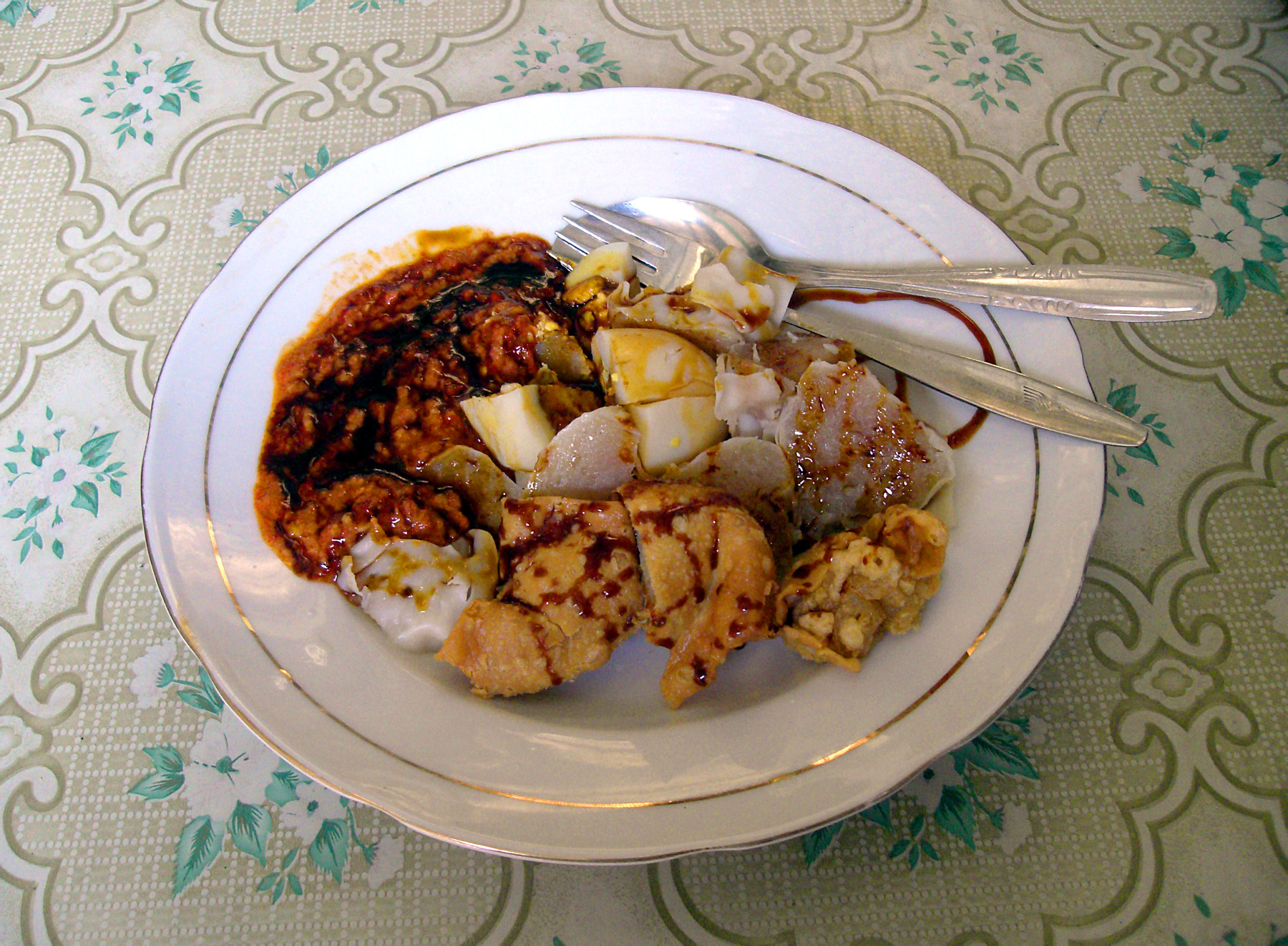
Siomay mixed with batagor as served in a foodstall near Bandung train station

== See also ==
- List of steamed foods
