= Ocean City Seafood Restaurant =

Defunct Chinese restaurant in Portland, Oregon, US

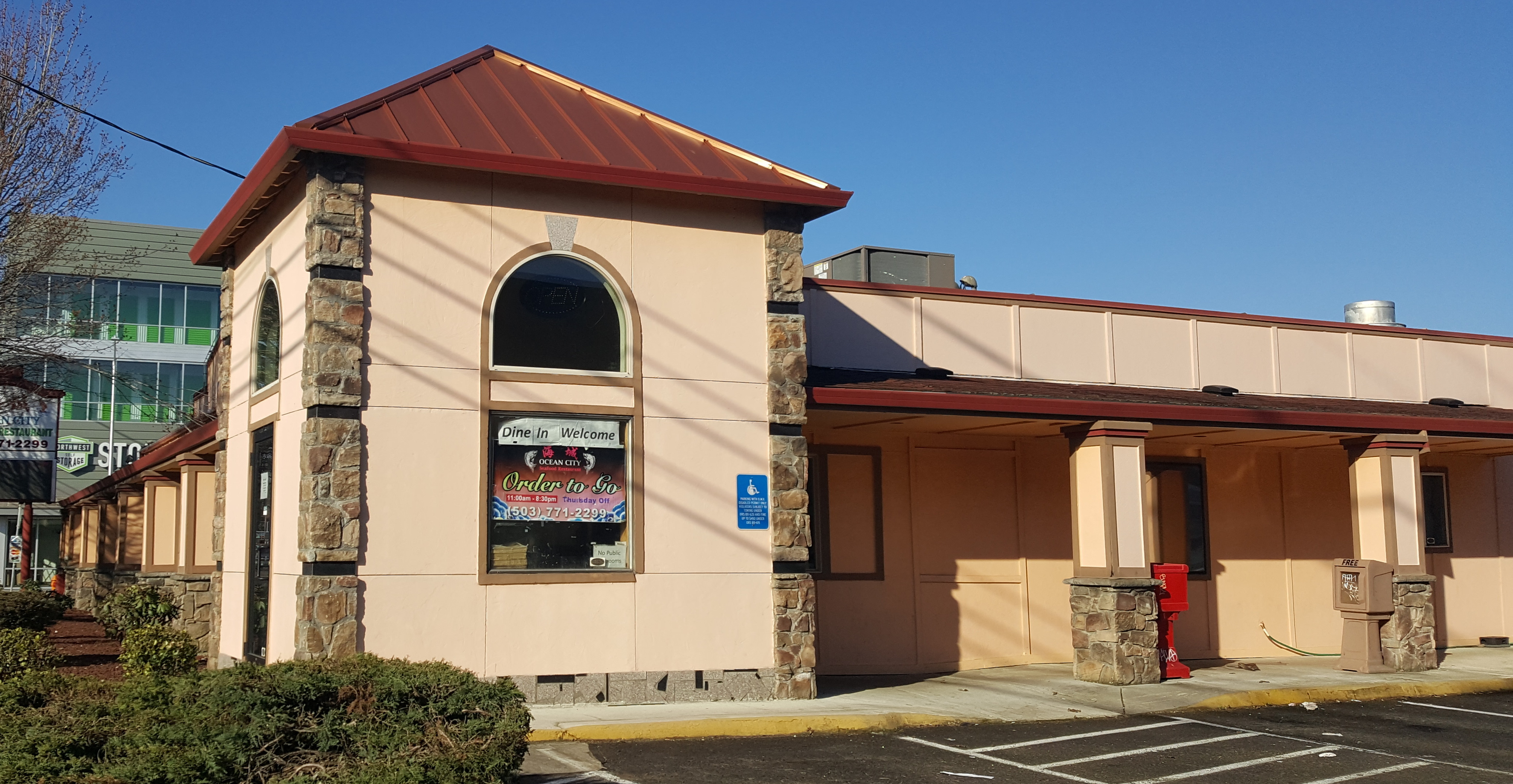
- The restaurant's exterior in 2022
- Interactive map of Ocean City Seafood Restaurant

Restaurant information
- Owners: Lisa Fan; Shao Wei Feng
- Food type: Chinese (Cantonese)
- Location: 3016 Southeast 82nd Avenue, Portland, Multnomah, Oregon, 97266, United States
- Coordinates: 45.5003°N 122.5784°W
- Website: portlandoceancity.com

Ocean City Seafood Restaurant was a Chinese restaurant in Portland, Oregon, United States.

== Description ==
Ocean City Seafood Restaurant served Chinese cuisine in southeast Portland's Jade District, within the Powellhurst-Gilbert neighborhood. The menu included dim sum such as fried and steamed dumplings and jian dui (sesame balls), chicken feet, congee, rice cake and turnip cake, and shark fin soup.

KGW has said the business provided a "family-style Chinese dining experience". A representative of the social justice advocacy group Asian Pacific American Network of Oregon said of the atmosphere: "If you go there even when it opens, there's already people sitting there reading their paper and having their tea and enjoying the dim sum. It's almost like the local hangout in the morning. People are there to convene."

== History ==
Co-owners Lisa Fan and Shao Wei Feng, both of whom previously worked at Wong's King, opened Ocean City in June 2009.

The restaurant operated via take-out and delivery during the COVID-19 pandemic. Fan said fear of COVID-19 reduced business by as much as fifty percent. In March 2020, the restaurant hosted U.S. Rep. Earl Blumenauer and members of the Portland Asian American Business Community to discuss "coronavirus discrimination". The restaurant had closed permanently by mid 2022. Michael Russell of The Oregonian wrote:

Another one of Portland's signature dim sum restaurants appears to have closed. Ocean City, a longtime rival to Wong's King Seafood, was closed during a recent trip down Southeast 82nd Avenue, its building wrapped in a chain link fence. The Ocean City website remains operational, but no one answered the phone or follow-up emails to the restaurant.

== Reception ==
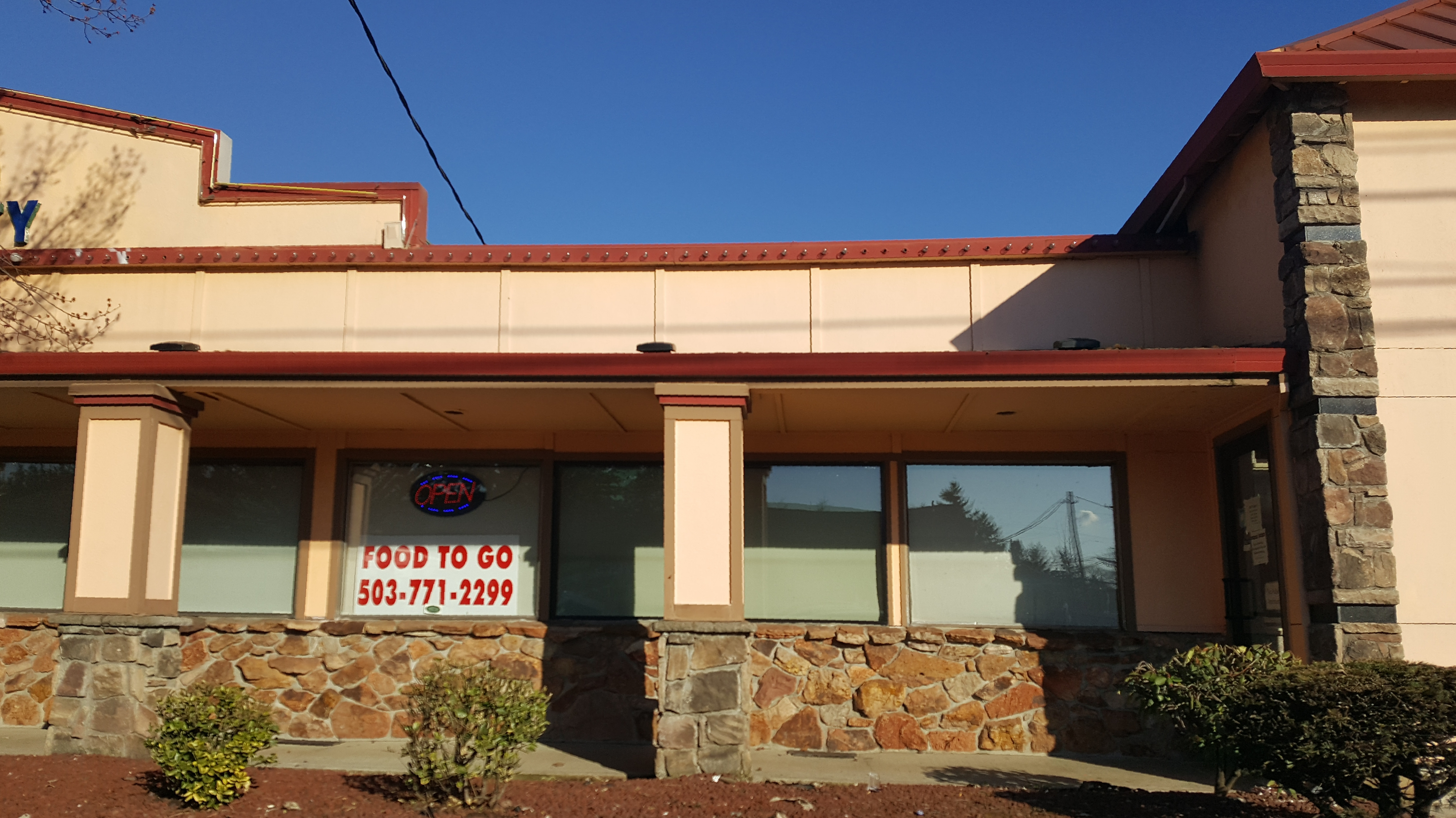
The restaurant's exterior, 2022

Drew Tyson included Ocean City in Thrillist's 2014 "guide to Portland's 6 best dim sum spots". He wrote, "One of the big three on 82nd and a well-known haven for Asian food, Ocean City might not get the general recognition of Wong's King... but if you ask most of the city's top chefs they'd say this spot is their favorite. Tables fill up fast so make sure to get there early or be relegated to the edge of the dining room where, by the time the cart gets to you, they'll only have chewy chicken feet left."

In 2016, Samantha Bakall of The Oregonian wrote, "Ocean City's trump card is chicken feet, which are the best I've eaten anywhere to date. They're shiny and glazed, resting in a pool of brick red, almost chunky black bean sauce. They were a little too salty this visit, but I'm going to look past that here." She also included the dim sum in a 2017 list of Southeast Portland's 39 "best cheap eats". The newspaper's Michael Russell included the golden corn dumplings in a 2016 overview of the best dumplings along Southeast 82nd Avenue.

== See also ==
- Cantonese restaurant
- History of Chinese Americans in Portland, Oregon
- List of Chinese restaurants
