= Shumai =

Type of traditional Chinese dumpling

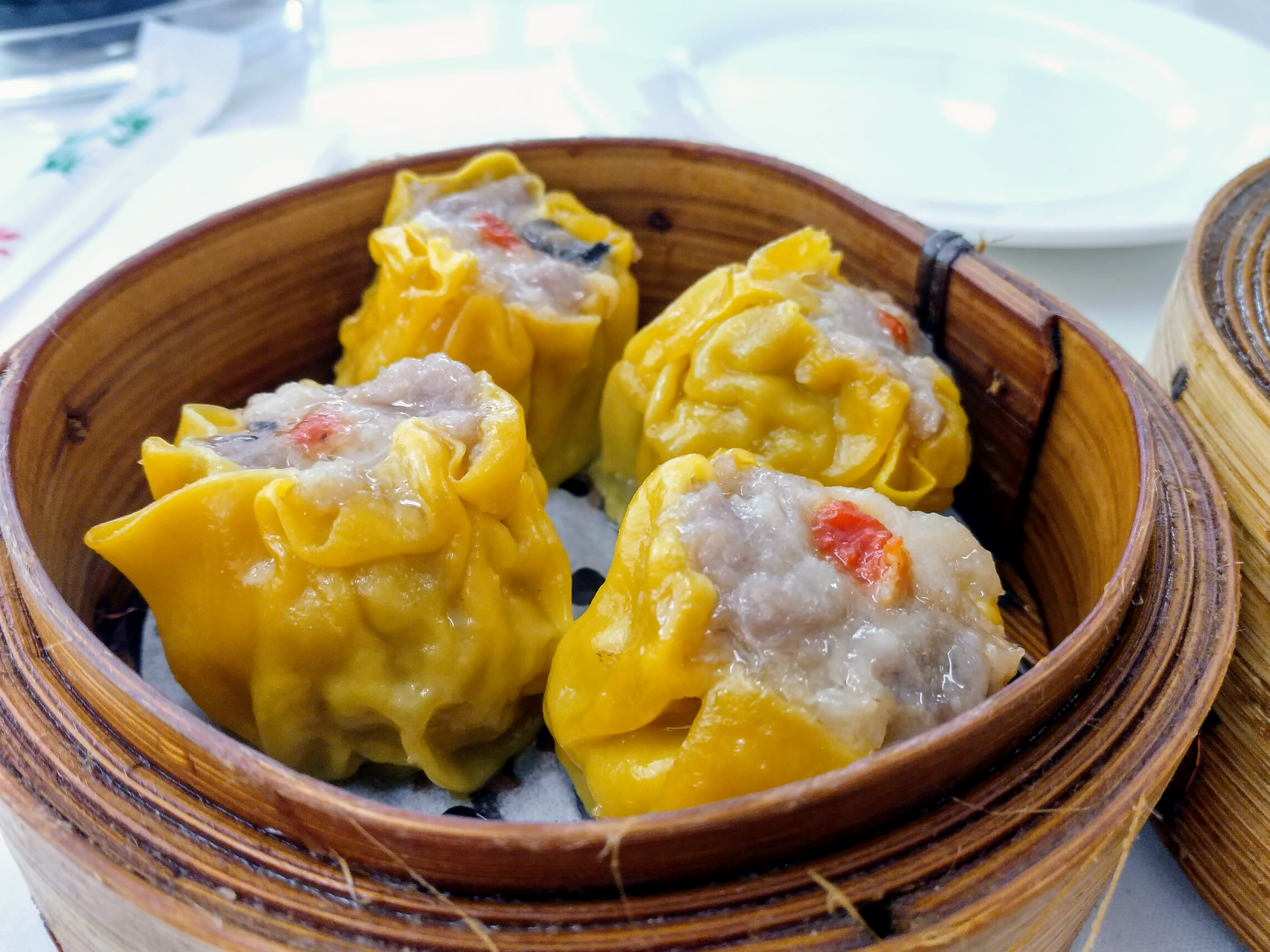
- Shumai in a bamboo steamer
- Alternative names: Variously spelled shaomai, shui mai, shu mai, sui mai, shui mei, siu mai, shao mai, xíu mại (Vietnamese), siomai (Filipino), siumai (Malaysian), siomay (Indonesian)
- Course: Dim sum
- Place of origin: China
- Region or state: Guangzhou, Guangdong or Hohhot, Inner Mongolia
- Main ingredients: Seasoned ground pork, whole and chopped mutton, Chinese black mushroom, lye water dough
- Variations: Siomay

Shumai

Chinese name
- Traditional Chinese: 燒賣
- Simplified Chinese: 烧卖
- Jyutping: siu^{1} maai^{2}
- Hanyu Pinyin: shāomài
- Literal meaning: to cook and sell
Transcriptions
Standard Mandarin
- Hanyu Pinyin: shāomài
- IPA: [ʂáʊmâɪ]
Wu
- Wugniu: sau^{1} ma^{6}
- IPA: Shanghainese: [sɔ˥ ma˧]
Hakka
- Romanization: sehw mai
Yue: Cantonese
- Yale Romanization: sīumáai
- Jyutping: siu^{1} maai^{2}
- IPA: [siw˥maj˧˥]
Southern Min
- Hokkien POJ: sio-māi

Vietnamese name
- Vietnamese alphabet: xíu mại
- Chữ Hán: 燒賣

Thai name
- Thai: ขนมจีบ [kʰā.nǒm.t͡ɕìːp]
- RTGS: khanom chip

Japanese name
- Kanji: 焼売
- Kana: シュウマイ
Transcriptions
- Romanization: shūmai

Indonesian name
- Indonesian: siomai / siomay / somay

Filipino name
- Tagalog: siomai / siyomay

Hindi name
- Hindi: momo

Shumai (simplified Chinese: 烧卖; traditional Chinese: 燒賣; pinyin: shāomài; Cantonese Yale: sīu-máai; Pe̍h-ōe-jī: sio-māi; Wugniu: sau^{1} ma^{6}) is a type of traditional Chinese dumpling meat made of ground pork. In Cantonese cuisine, it is usually served as a dim sum snack, and is served with an additional serving of soy sauce. In addition to accompanying the Chinese diaspora, variations of shumai can be found in Japan, Southeast Asia, and South America. Variations include the Hawaiian pork hash and the Indonesian siomay. In Australia, it developed into dim sim.

== Popular Chinese varieties ==
=== Cantonese siumaai ===
This is the most well-known variety outside of Asia and is from the southern provinces of Guangdong and Guangxi. As prepared in Cantonese cuisine, siumaai is also referred to as "pork and mushroom dumpling". Its standard filling consists primarily of ground pork, small whole or chopped shrimp, Chinese black mushroom, green onion (also called scallion) and ginger with seasonings of Chinese rice wine (e.g. Shaoxing rice wine), soy sauce, sesame oil and chicken stock. Bamboo shoots, water chestnuts and pepper can also be added. The outer covering is made of a thin sheet of lye water dough, which is either yellow or white. The center is usually garnished with an orange dot, made of crab roe or diced carrot, although a green dot made with a pea may be used. The decorative presentations vary.

A fish paste variety of siumaai is sold as a popular street food in Hong Kong, usually alongside curry fishballs. It is most often eaten with a sweet soy sauce and/or chili oil.

Pig liver shiumai (豬潤燒賣) is a variety of shiumai sold at traditional tea houses such as Luk Yu (陸羽茶室) and Lin Heung Tea House (蓮香樓).

The Hong Kong Siumaipedia was written to document the Cantonese variety.

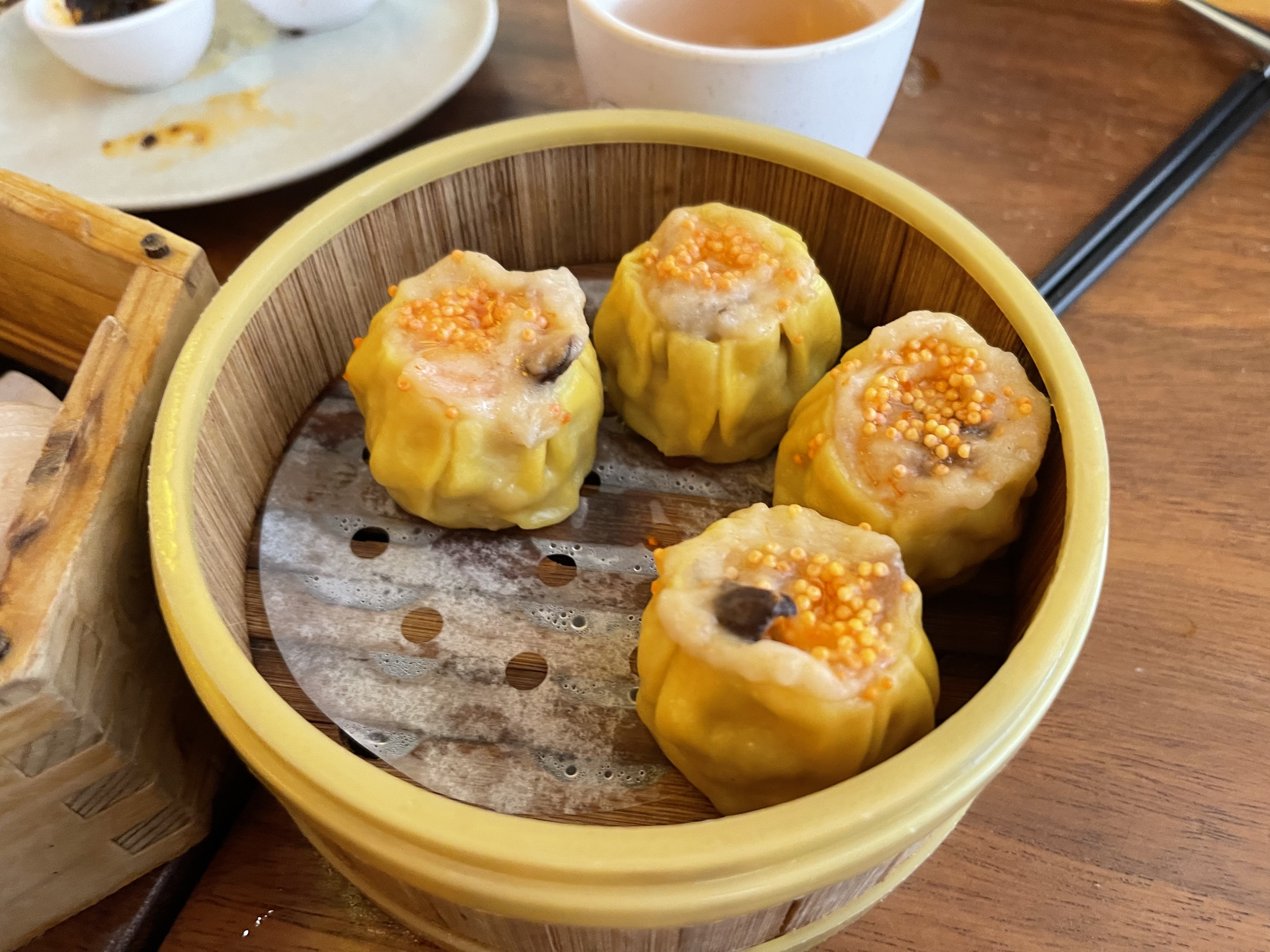

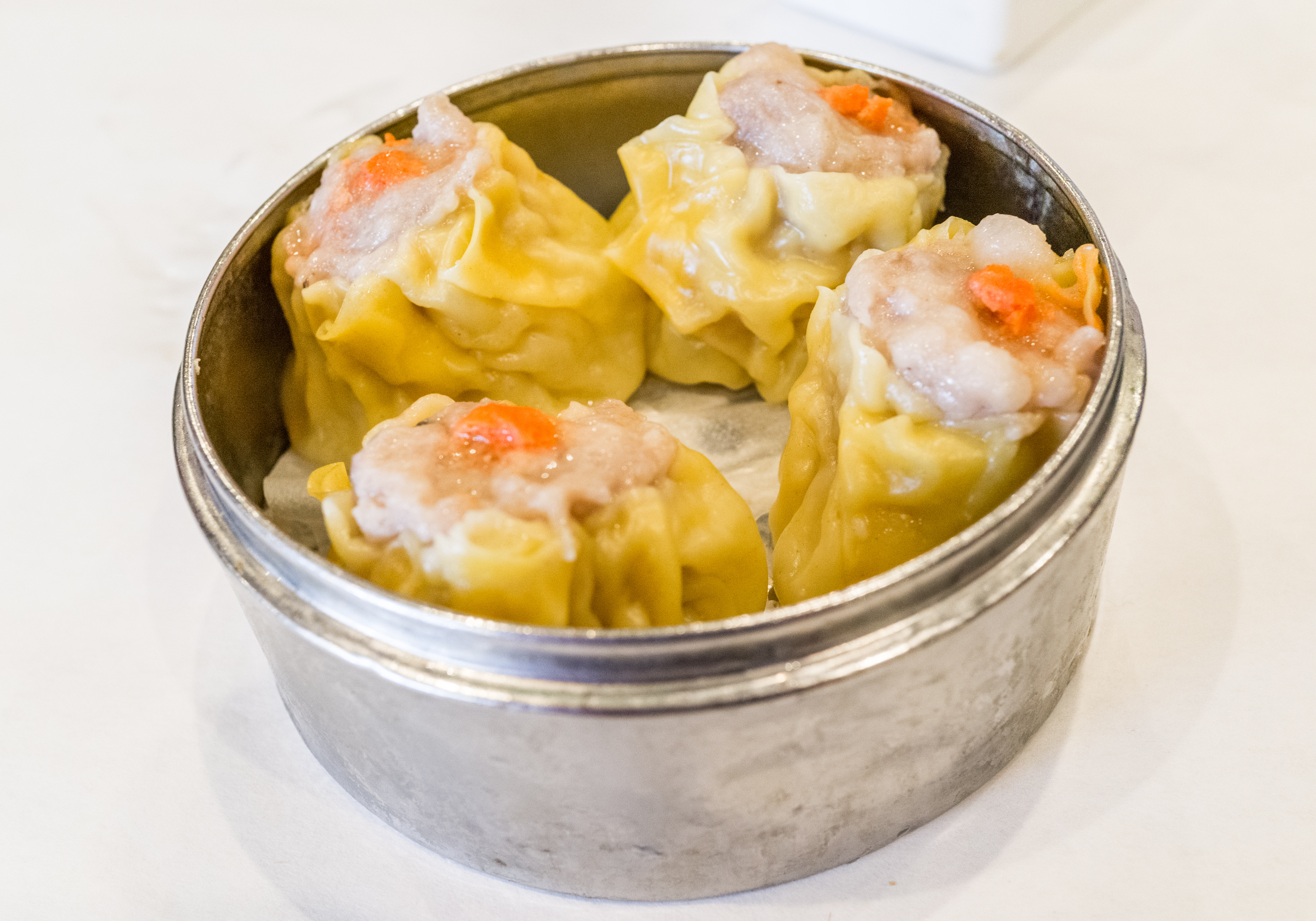

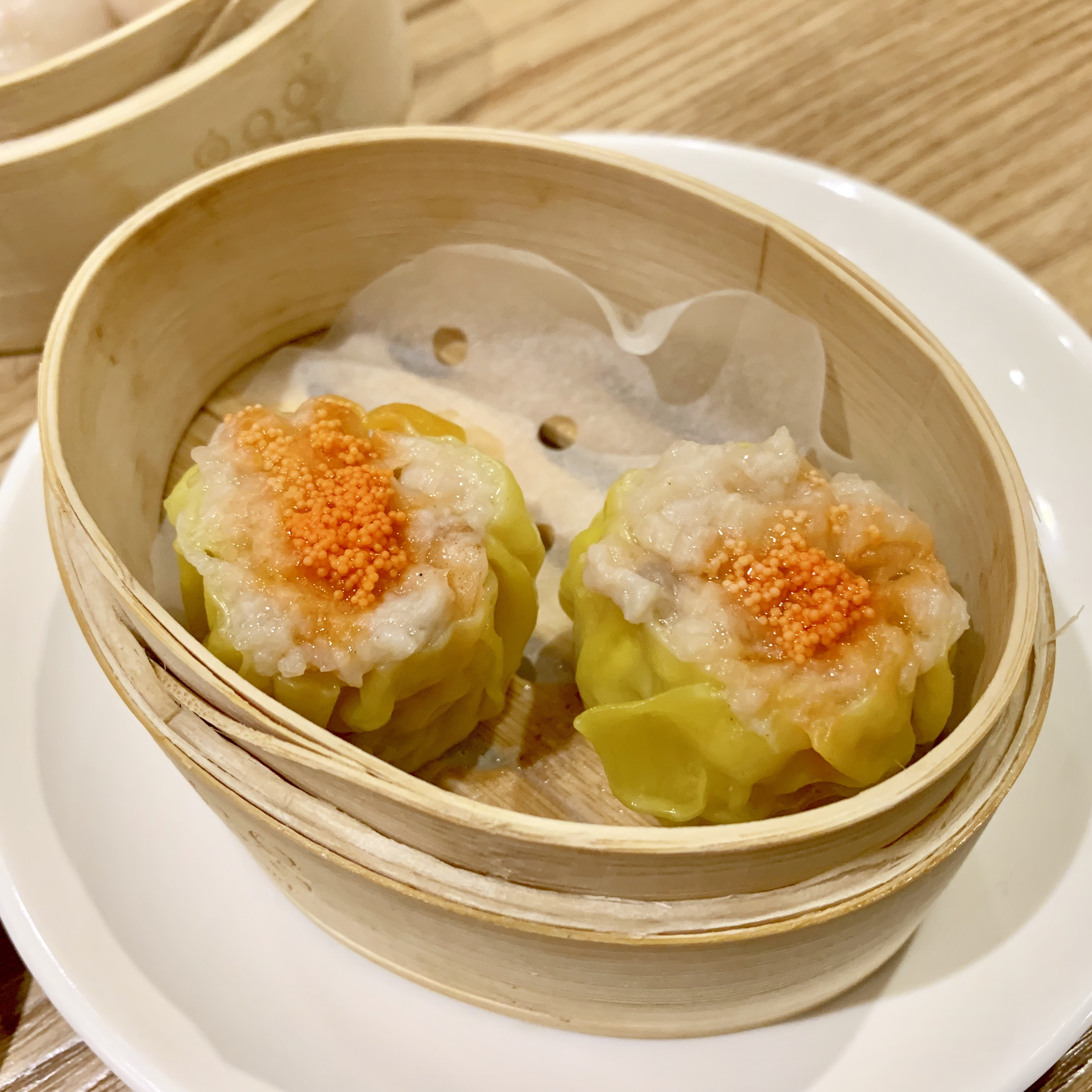

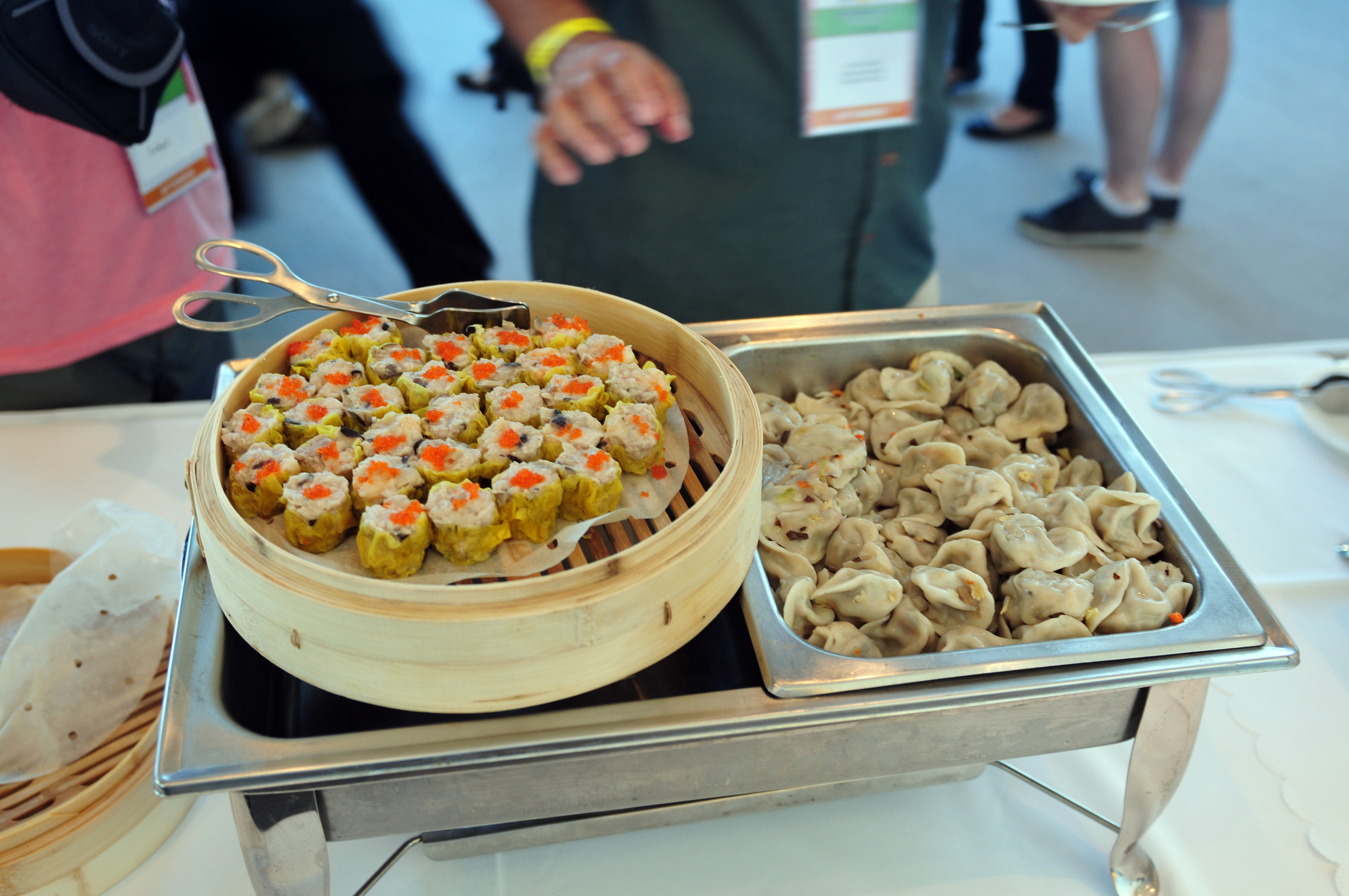

=== Hohhot shaomai ===
Hohhot shaomai is a regional variety in Hohhot, Inner Mongolia.

The wrapping is a very thin, round sheet of unleavened dough, with a pleated border. There is only one kind of filling, which mainly consists of chopped or minced mutton, scallion and ginger. Hohhot shaomai features this extensive use of scallion and ginger, creating a dense combined scent, and a slightly spicy taste. The filling is put in the center of the wrapping and the border of the wrapping is loosely gathered above, forming a "neck" and a flower-shaped top. It is then cooked by steaming or pan-frying. Hohhot shaomai is served in the unit of "liang", which means either eight steamed ones served in a steamer tier, or eight fried ones served in a dish. "Liang" is equal to 50 grams, is traditionally used as an indication of the total weight of the wrapping. Hohhot shaomai is commonly served with vinegar and tea, due to its greasiness.

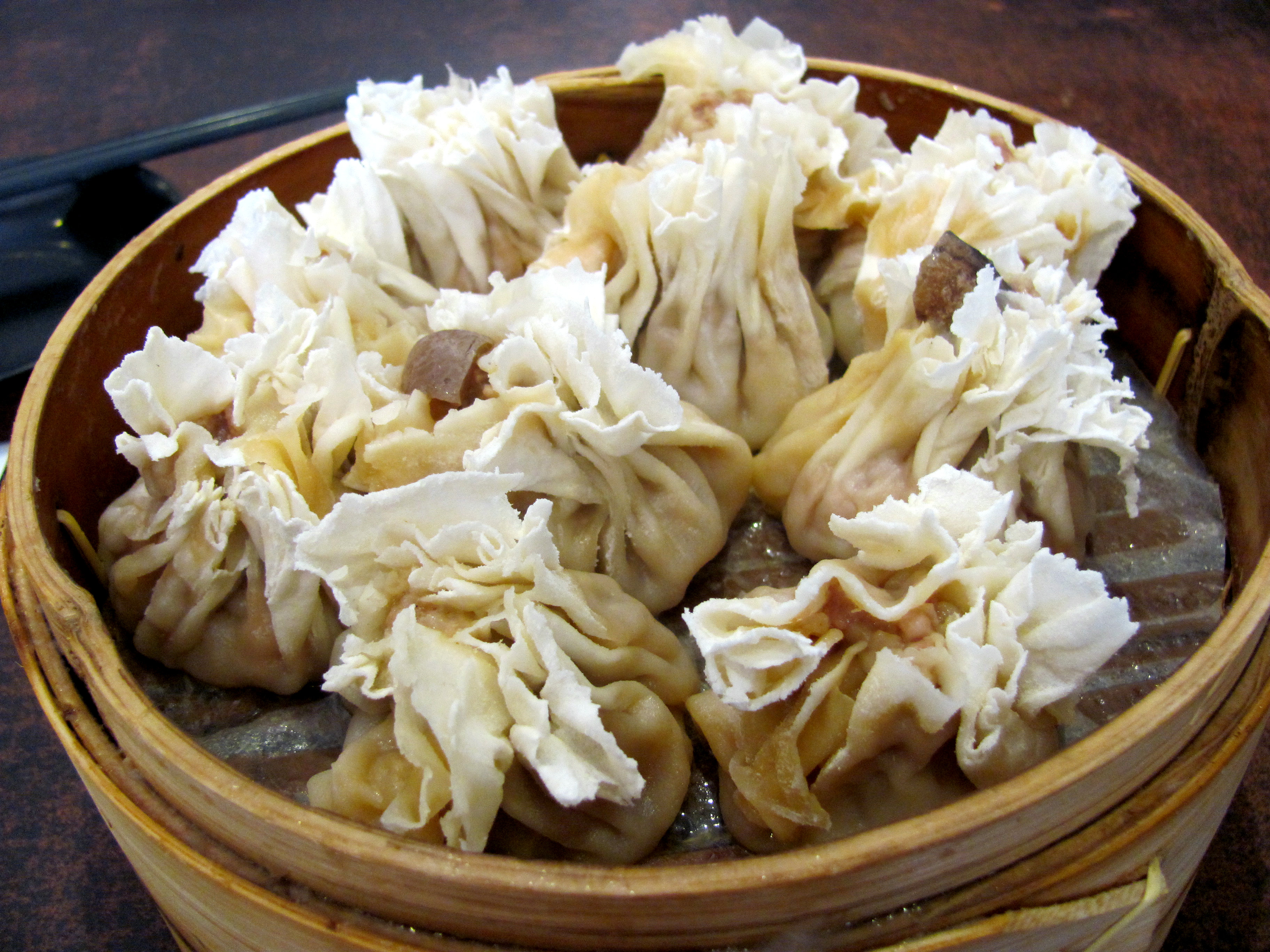
Mutton and scallion shaomai from Inner Mongolia

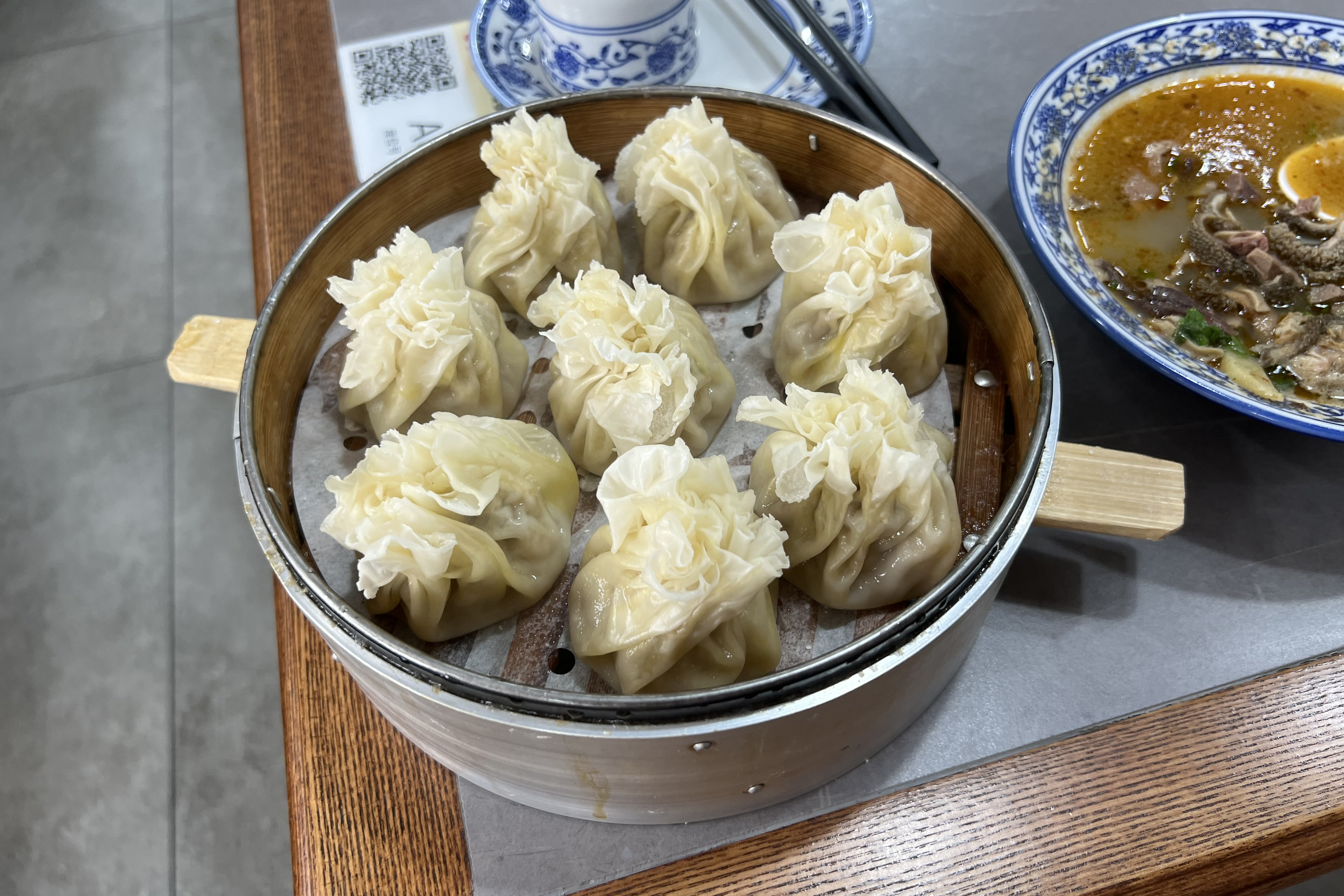

=== Hunan juhua shaomai ===
Called the chrysanthemum shaomai (菊花燒賣), this variety is made in Changsha (長沙), Hunan province (湖南). This shaomai is named for its opening resembling the chrysanthemum flower petal shape. It is spicy with pepper and the wrapper is translucent. The filling largely consists of glutinous rice, pork hash, shrimp, shiitake mushrooms, bamboo shoots and onion.

=== Jiangnan shaomai ===
Shaomai common in the Jiangnan region (stretching from Shanghai to Nanjing) has a filling similar to zongzi from the region, containing marinated pork pieces in glutinous rice, soy sauce and Shaoxing wine, steamed with pork fat. It is larger than the Cantonese version.

The Shanghai variation also contains shiitake mushrooms and onion. The mince, mushrooms and onion are stir-fried before being prepared as the filling.

Another type of Shaomai prepared in the region contains minced pork and bamboo shoot pieces. Xiasha Shaomai is a famous traditional snack from the Xiasha Old Street in Nanhui, Pudong, Shanghai, and Fengjing Shaomai is a traditional, intangible cultural heritage snack from Fengjing Ancient Town in Jinshan, Shanghai; the former uses spring bamboo shoots and the latter uses winter bamboo shoots. This type of Shaomai is also common in Jiaxing and Hangzhou.

=== Uyghur shaomai ===
In northwest China, the Uyghur people of Xinjiang adapted shaomai into two regional varieties. The southern Xinjiang recipes differ slightly from the northern version in terms of ingredients and method. The filling of the northern version consists of mutton or beef, along with green onion and radish, whereas the southern filling primarily uses glutinous rice with smaller amounts of mutton or beef. Minced meat from sheep ribs containing some fat is ideal.

=== Jiangxi Yifeng shaomai ===
Called the Yifeng shaomai in the southeastern Jiangxi province, this version's distinct flavour comes from a blend of pork mince, bread flour, sesame seed powder, ground pepper and sugar. It is particularly popular in the area of Yifeng Tanshan Tianbao where it is one of the foods eaten during the Chinese New Year celebration.

== Variants from other countries ==
=== Japanese shūmai ===
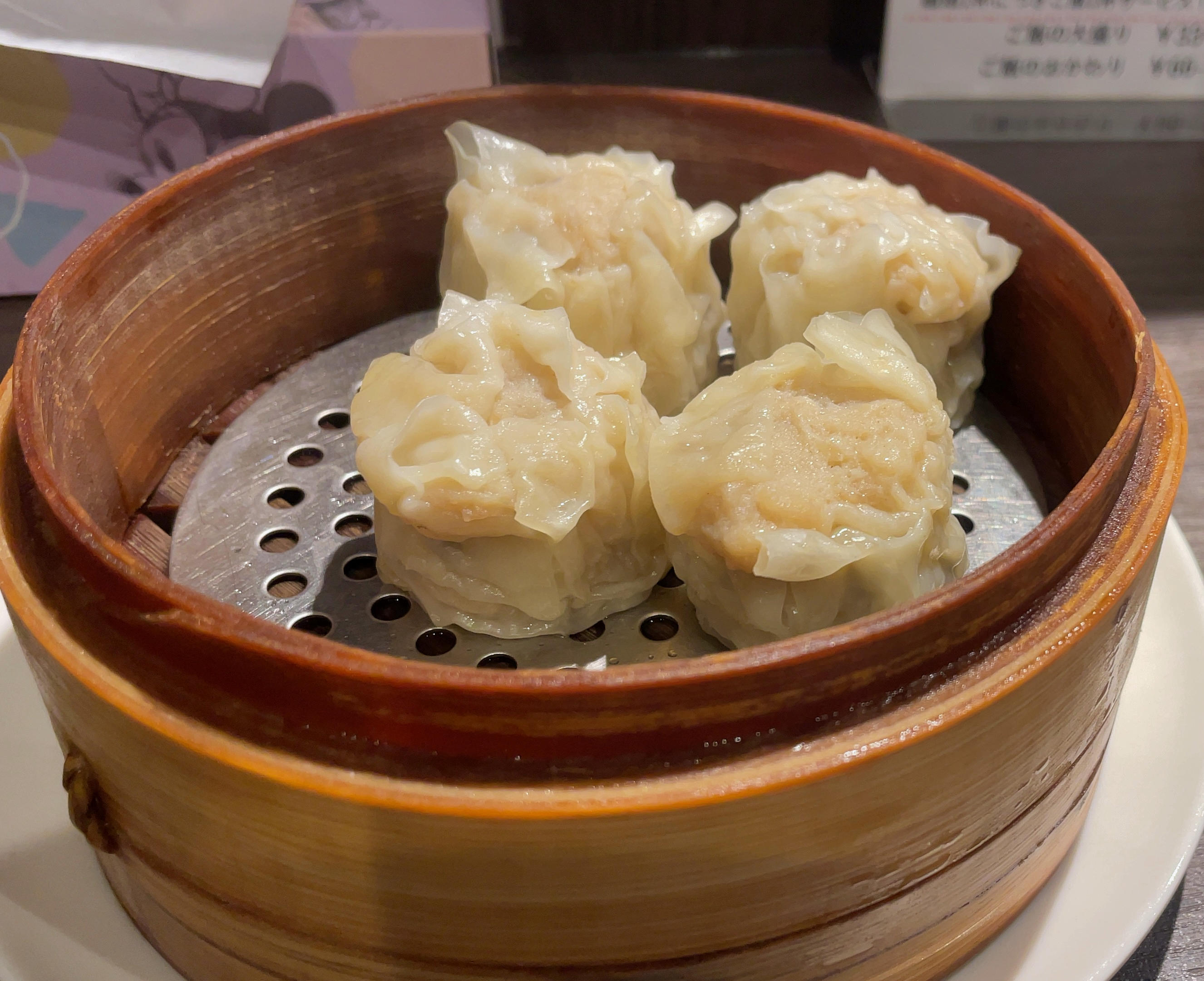
Japanese shūmai in a bamboo steamer

Shūmai in Japan usually use pork and minced onion as the main ingredients and are often topped with a green pea. While the meat filling in Chinese shaomai is usually minced, the meat filling in Japanese shumai is ground to a paste.

=== Hawaiian pork hash ===
Pork hash in Hawaii consists primarily of ground pork, sometimes with minced shrimp added. Lye is sometimes used to treat the pork to add a bouncy texture. Ginger, Chinese rice wine, soy sauce, sesame oil, and white pepper are common seasonings to the farce. Water chestnuts and carrots are sometimes added. The outer covering is made of a thin yellow or white dough. Pork hash in Hawaii is fairly large, often the size of a large chicken egg. It is often served with soy sauce mixed with hot mustard.

=== Indonesian siomay ===
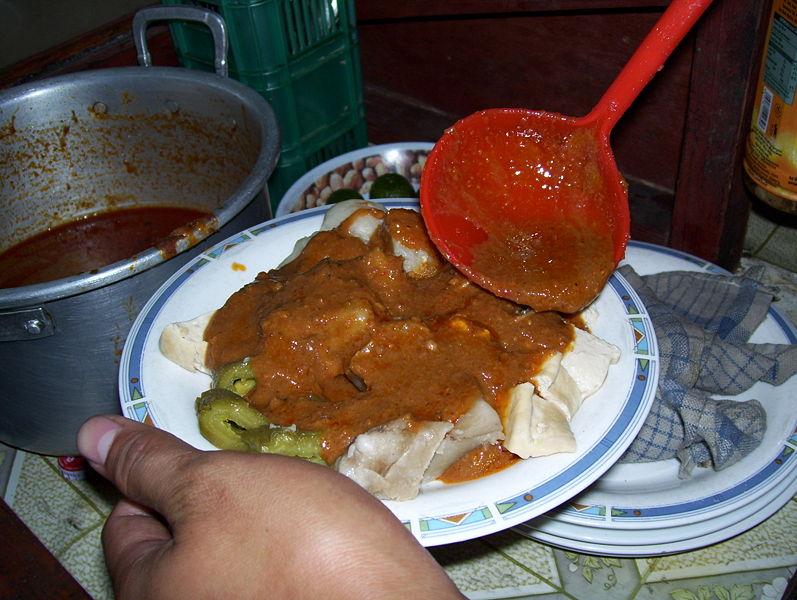
Indonesian siomay is served with peanut sauce.

Siomay or siomai (sometimes called somay) in Indonesia is pronounced the same way as its sisters and is usually a wonton wrapper, stuffed with filling and steamed. It is also served with steamed potatoes, tofu, hard-boiled eggs, steamed bitter gourd and cabbages, all sliced and topped with peanut sauce and kecap manis (sweet soy sauce). Because the population of Indonesia is largely Muslim, Indonesian siomay rarely uses pork. Instead, it is often made from various fish, most commonly wahoo or mackerel tuna, other variants that uses shrimp or chicken is also popular in Indonesia. This variant is less common in Western countries.

=== Philippine siomai ===
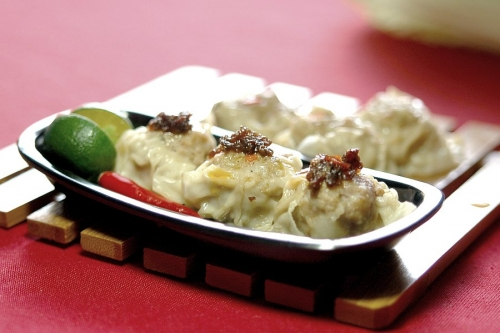
Philippine siomai with calamansi and siling labuyo

Siomai ([ˈʃomaɪ]; Filipino: siyomay) in the Philippines is often ground pork, beef, shrimp, and the like. It is combined with extenders like garlic, green peas, carrots and among others which is then wrapped in wonton wrappers. It is commonly steamed, with a popular variant being fried, resulting in a crisp exterior. It is normally dipped in soy sauce with the juice of calamansi, a Philippine lime, and a chili-garlic oil is sometimes added to the sauce.

A recent variant on siomai is wrapped in sheets of laver after the wonton wrappers, which are marketed as "Japanese".

=== Thai khanom jeeb ===
Khanom jeeb or written as Khanom chip (Thai: ขนมจีบ; pronounced [kʰā.nǒm.t͡ɕìːp]) is a Thai version of shumai. Khanom jeeb is a Thai term that means "pleated snack", is a staple at Chinese restaurants and dim sum carts. However, there is another type of khanom jeeb that is considered to be a traditional Thai khanom jeeb, which is different from Chinese khanom jeeb. Thai khamon jeeb is mentioned in Kap He Chom Khrueang Khao Wan, a royal poem work of King Rama II from the early Rattanakosin period, more than 200 years ago. Thai khanom jeebs are wrapped in white flour similar to har gow and pleated to form a bird-like shape, hence they are also called "khanom jeeb nok" (ขนมจีบนก; pronounced [kʰā.nǒm.t͡ɕìːp nók]; lit. 'bird-shaped steamed dumplings') and they are not eaten with the sour soy sauce used for Chinese khanom jeebs. They are also eaten with lettuce and chili peppers, just like sakhu sai mu.

For Chinese khamom jeebs or shumei, in some southern provinces such as Phuket or Trang, the dipping sauce is different from other regions, namely, it is a reddish-brown and sweet sauce. Eating khanom jeebs with this dipping sauce is part of eating dim sum and is a common breakfast culture of Trang locals.

=== Vietnamese xíu mại ===
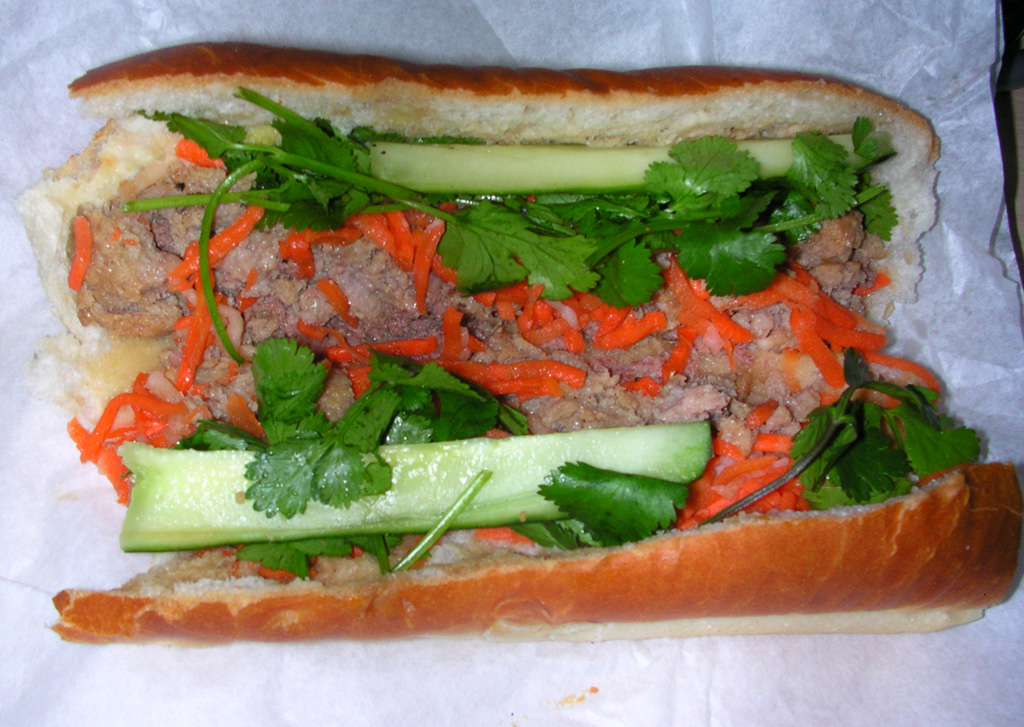
Bánh mì xíu mại

Xíu mại in Vietnam has minced pork, onion, scallion and shredded bread as the main ingredients and is cooked in tomato sauce. It is usually served in a roll of bánh mì for breakfast. Because the recipe omits dough wrappings, it is more akin to a meatball rather than shumai.

== History ==
As described by historical materials, shaomai was served in tea houses as a secondary product. The name shaomai (捎賣; 捎卖), means the product was "sold as a sideline", with tea. It is considered to have been brought to Beijing and Tianjin by merchants from Shanxi, causing its later wide spread. The name was later transformed into modern forms like "燒麥; 烧麦", "稍美" and "燒賣; 烧卖", changing the characters while keeping the original shaomai pronunciation. The product was initially in the form of meat and vegetables wrapped in thin sheets, and was sold weighing only the wrapper, a tradition which is still kept in Hohhot. In 2021, "the craft of making Shaomai at Lao Suiyuan" was awarded as a non-material cultural heritage project in Hohhot.

== Serving ==
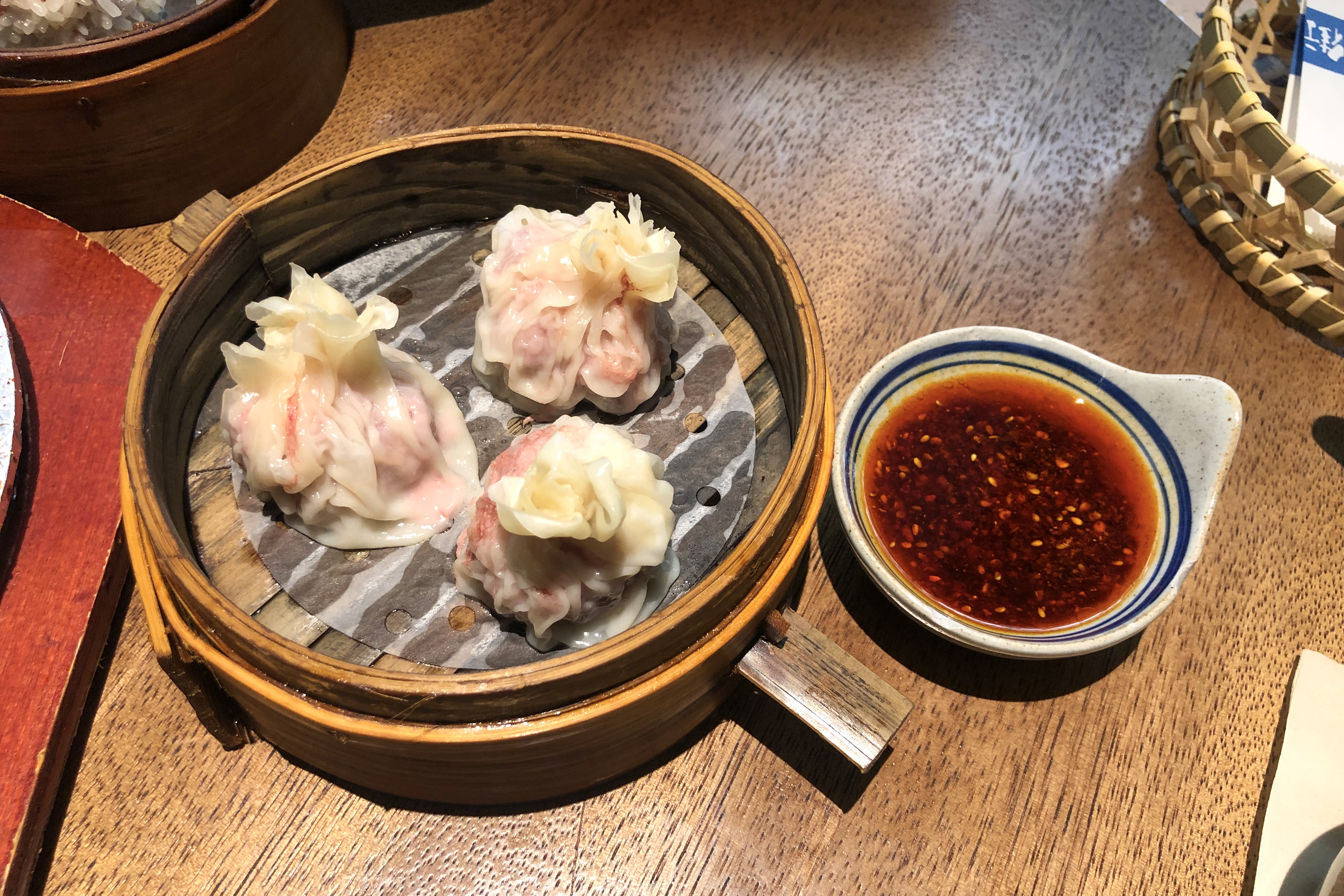
Shaomai with chili oil

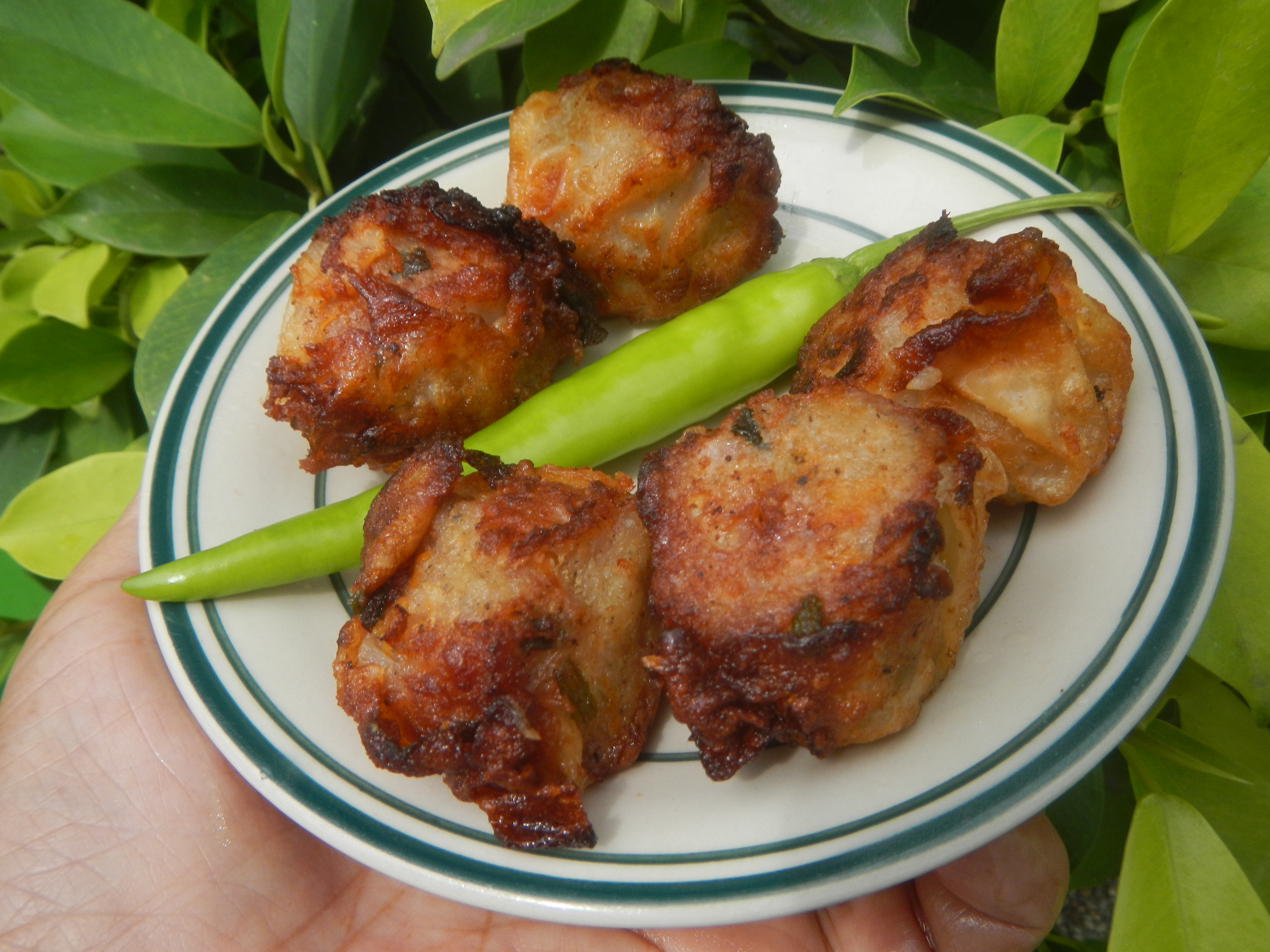
Fried siomai

In Hohhot (Inner Mongolia), shaomai is commonly served as a staple food, especially for breakfast. It is considered a local specialty in regions around Hohhot. Steamed shaomai are served in bamboo steamer tiers, and fried shaomai are served in dishes.

Within the dim sum tradition of southern China, shaomai is one of the most standard dishes. It is generally served alongside har gow, another variety of steamed dumpling containing shrimp, cooked pork fat, bamboo shoots and scallions; collectively these are known as har gow-siu mai (蝦餃燒賣).

In Guangzhou, siu mai (燒賣) and har gow (蝦餃), along with char siu bao (叉燒包), and egg tarts (蛋撻), are considered the classic dishes of Cantonese dim sum cuisine. They are collectively referred to as the "Four Heavenly Kings" of the cuisine. (Chinese: 四大天王; pinyin: sì dà tiān wáng; Cantonese Yale: sei daaih tīn wòhng).

In food stalls in Indonesia, siomai (or "siomay" in local dialect) are eaten together with steamed vegetables and tofu, and served with spicy peanut sauce.

In Philippine food stalls and fast food restaurants, siomai is eaten with dip, toothpicks to facilitate handling, or with rice (using a spoon and fork).
