= Har gow =

Cantonese food

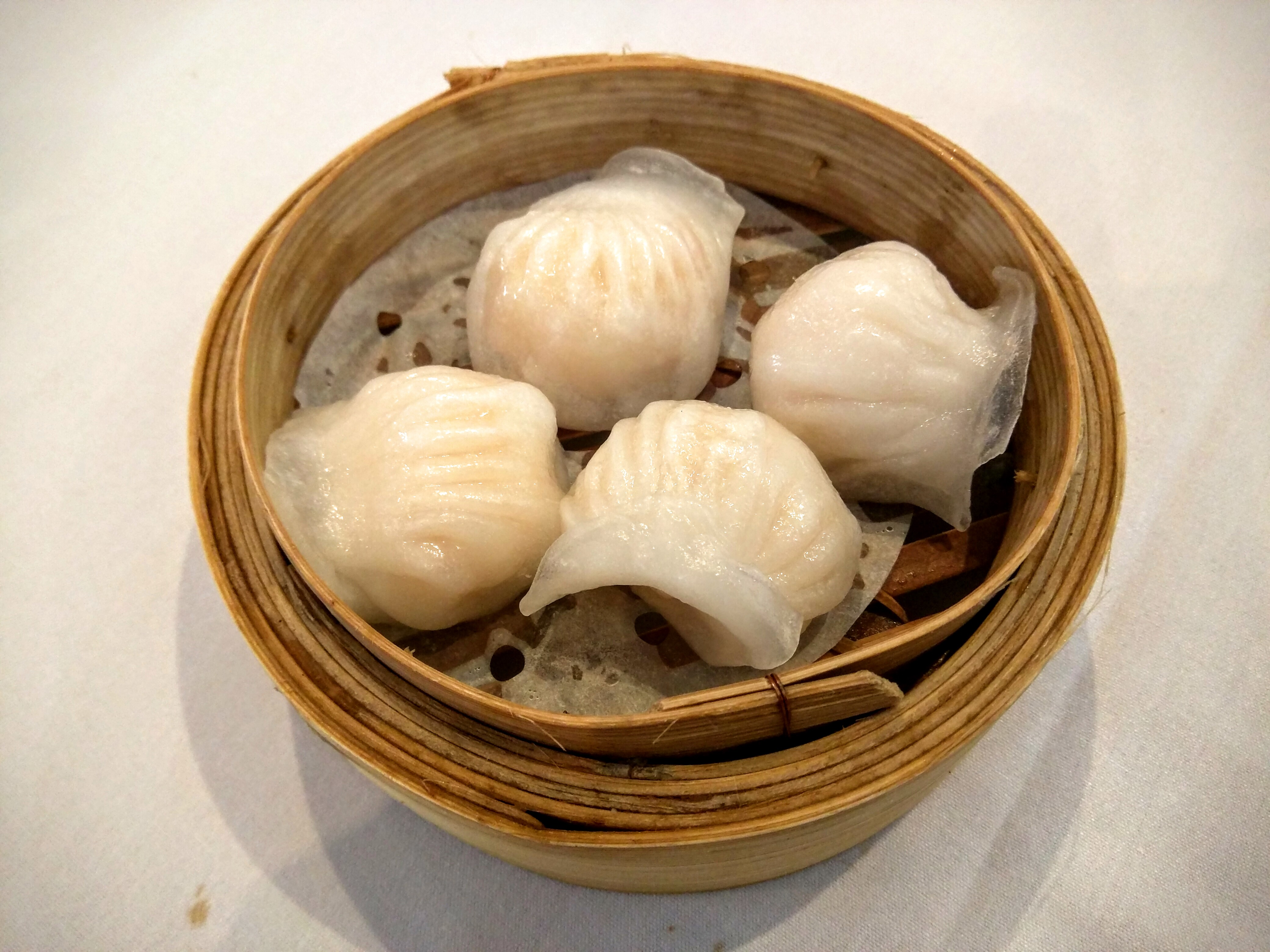
- Ha gow in a bamboo steamer
- Alternative names: Xia jiao, also spelled ha gau, ha gaau, ha gao, ha gow, or other variants, Vietnamese "há cảo"
- Course: Dim sum
- Place of origin: Guangdong, China
- Region or state: Cantonese-speaking region
- Main ingredients: Wheat starch, tapioca starch, shrimp, cooked pork fat, bamboo shoots, scallions, cornstarch, sesame oil, soy sauce, sugar, and other seasonings

Chinese name
- Traditional Chinese: 蝦餃
- Simplified Chinese: 虾饺
- Jyutping: haa¹ gaau²
- Cantonese Yale: hā gáau
- Hanyu Pinyin: xiājiǎo
- Literal meaning: shrimp dumpling
Transcriptions
Standard Mandarin
- Hanyu Pinyin: xiājiǎo
- IPA: [ɕjátɕjàʊ]
Yue: Cantonese
- Yale Romanization: hā gáau
- Jyutping: haa¹ gaau²
Southern Min
- Hokkien POJ: hê-kiáu hoê-kiáu

Vietnamese name
- Vietnamese: há cảo

Thai name
- Thai: ฮะเก๋า [háʔ.kǎw]
- RTGS: hakao

Har gow (Chinese: 蝦餃; pinyin: xiājiǎo; Jyutping: haa1 gaau2; lit. 'shrimp jiao'), also anglicized as ha gow, hau kau, or ha kao, is a traditional Cantonese dumpling served as dim sum. It is made of shrimp meat, and steamed in a flour wrapper. After cooking, the wrapper becomes somewhat translucent, and therefore ha gow is sometimes called crystal shrimp dumplings (水晶蝦餃).

== Name ==
The dumpling is sometimes called a shrimp bonnet for its pleated shape. This dish is often served together with shumai; when served in such a manner, the two items are collectively referred to as ha gow-siu mai (Chinese: 蝦餃燒賣; pinyin: xiājiǎo shāomài; Jyutping: haa1 gaau2 siu1 maai2; Cantonese Yale: hā gáau sīu máai).

Ha gow, shumai, cha siu bao, and egg tarts are considered the classic dishes of Cantonese dim sum cuisine and referred to as The Four Heavenly Kings. (Chinese: 四大天王; pinyin: sì dà tiān wáng; Cantonese Yale: sei daaih tīn wòhng).

== Description ==
These shrimp dumplings are transparent and smooth. Yi Zhen restaurant (怡珍茶楼) in Wufeng Village (五鳳村), Guangzhou, was the first restaurant to serve har gow. It was called Wufeng Har Gow (五鳳鮮蝦餃) at that time.

In a poem by Ho Shihuang (何世晃), a well-known Cantonese cook and author of "Classic Cantonese Pastry Techniques" (經典粵點技法), har gow is described as follows:

倒扇羅幃蟬透衣，
嫣紅淺笑半含痴
細嚐頓感流香液，
不枉嶺南獨一枝。

Translation:

Fanned silk gauze, a cicada peeking through.
A rosy smile, half-dazed and true.
A delicate taste, the fragrance flows.
The unique flower of Lingnan in full repose.

The poem shows that a juicy filling inside a thin, soft and translucent wrapping are the essentials of an authentic har gow.

This dish is said to be the one that the skill of a dim sum chef is judged on. Traditionally, har gow should have at least seven and preferably ten or more pleats imprinted on its wrapper. The skin must be thin and translucent, yet be sturdy enough not to break when picked up with chopsticks. It must not stick to the paper, container or the other har gow in the basket. The shrimp must be cooked well, but not overcooked. The amount of meat should be generous, yet not so much that it cannot be eaten in one bite.

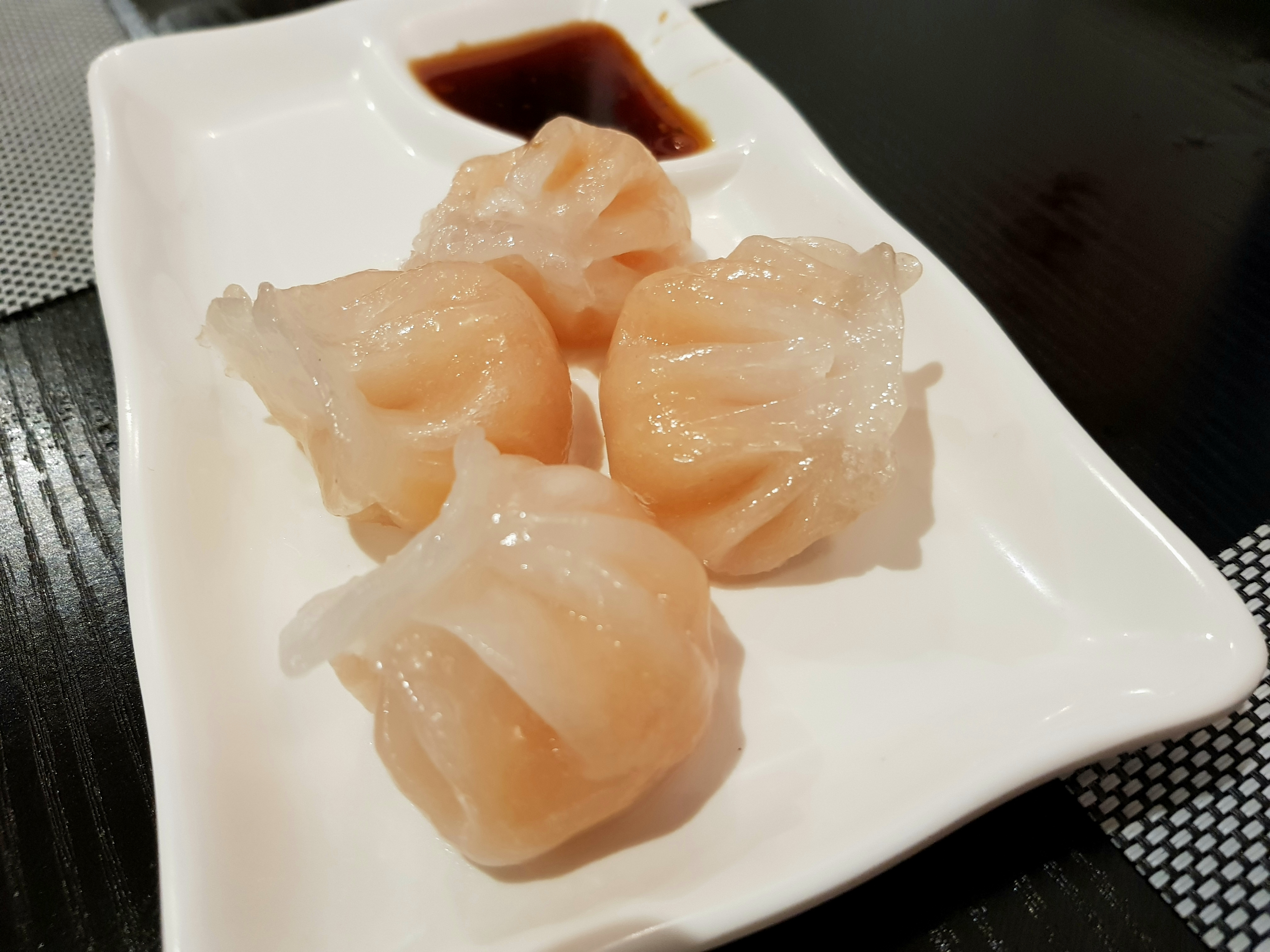

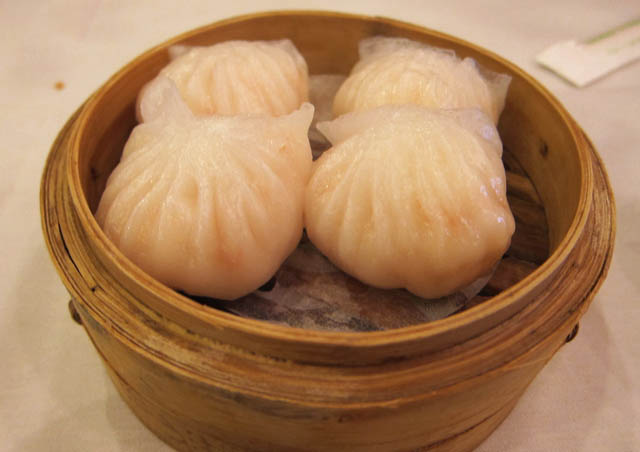

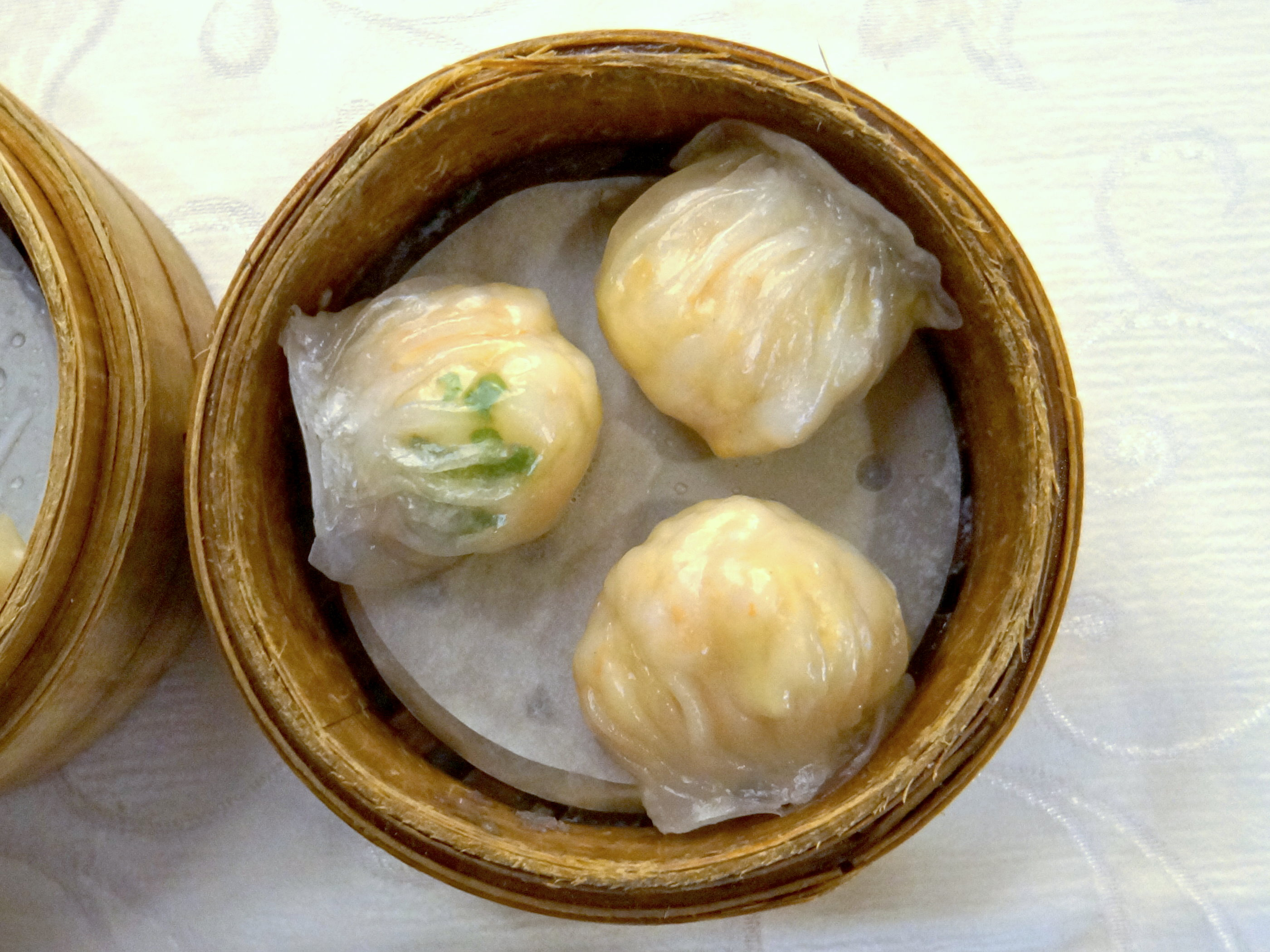

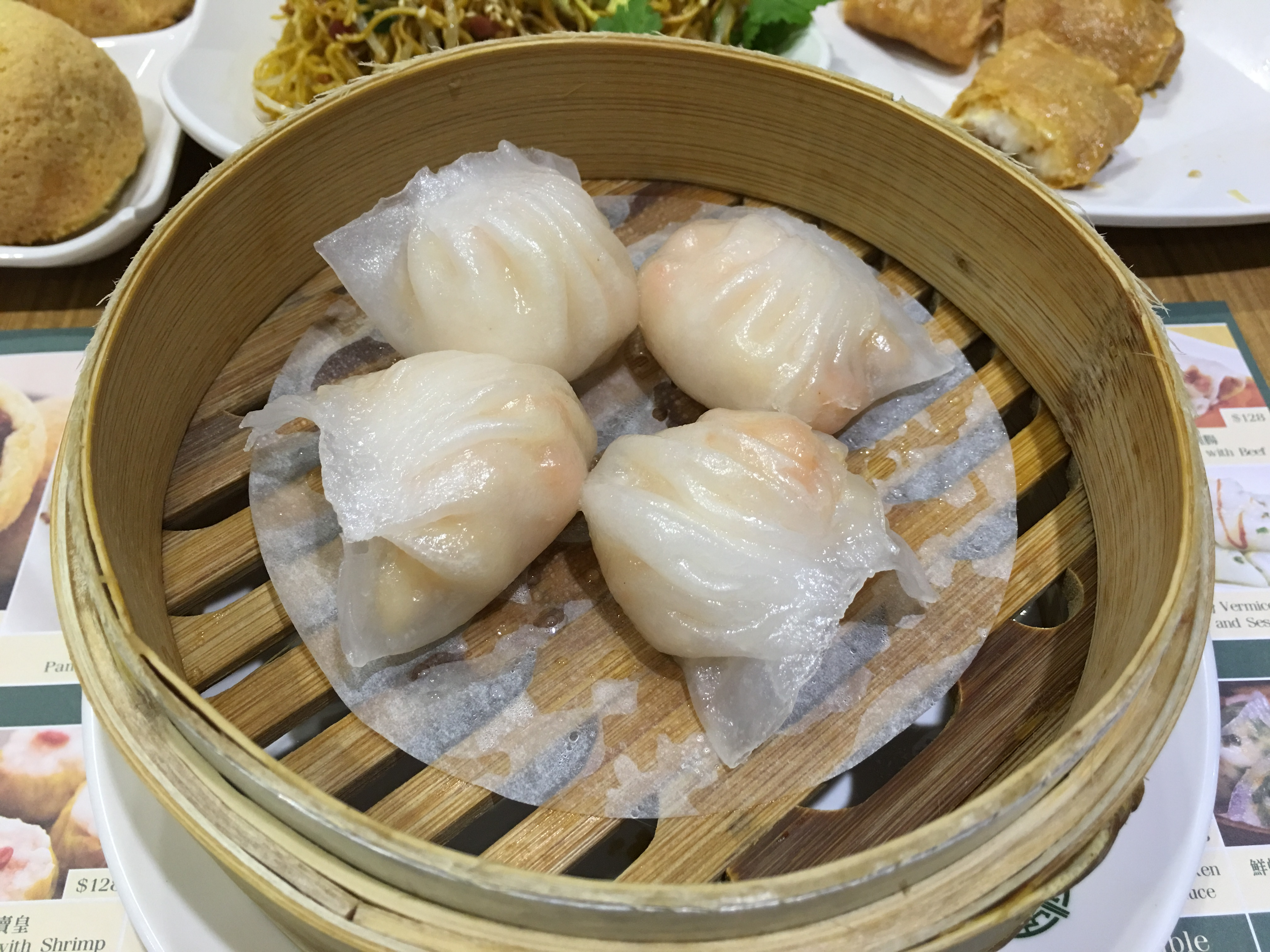

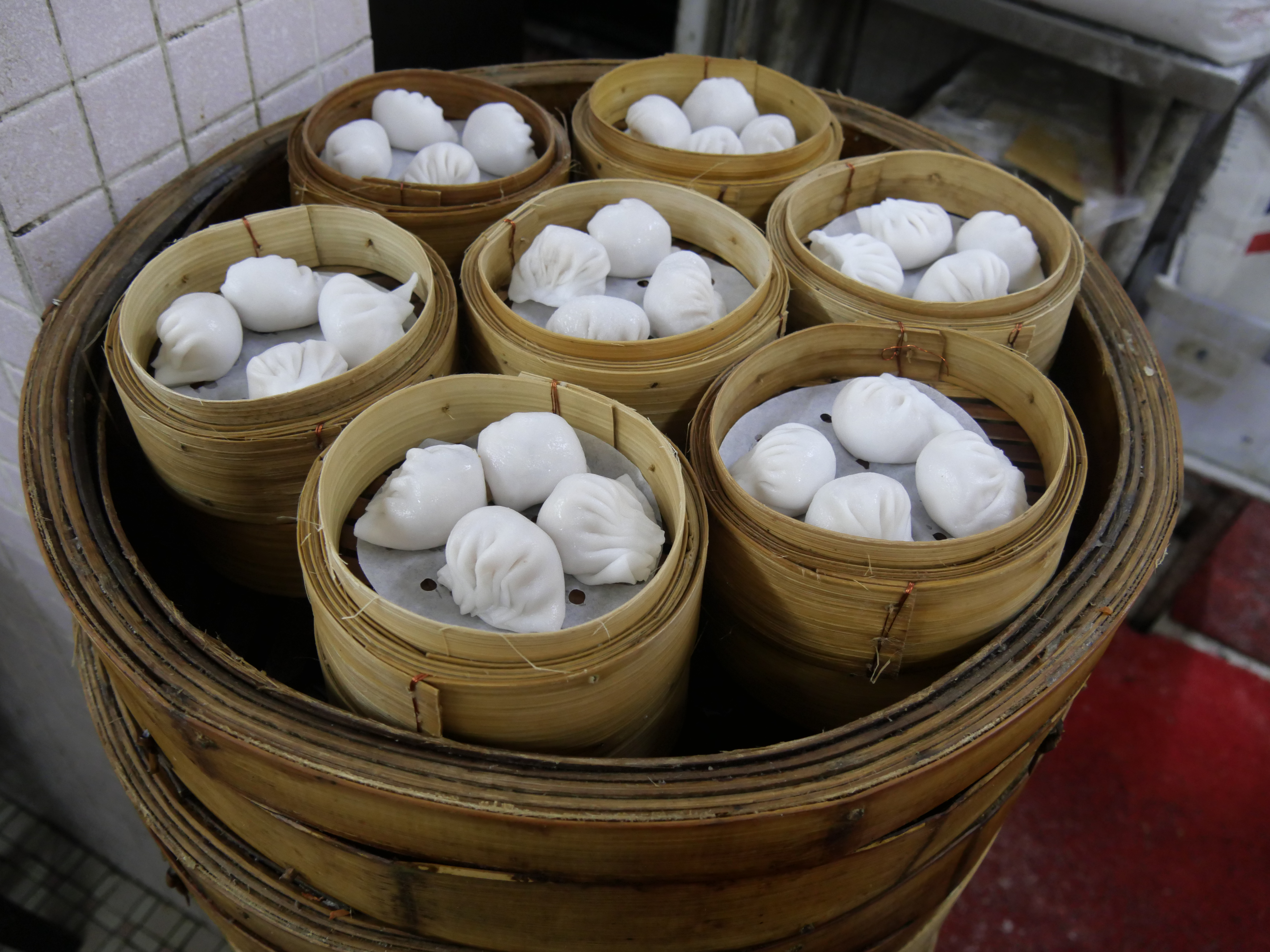
Before steaming

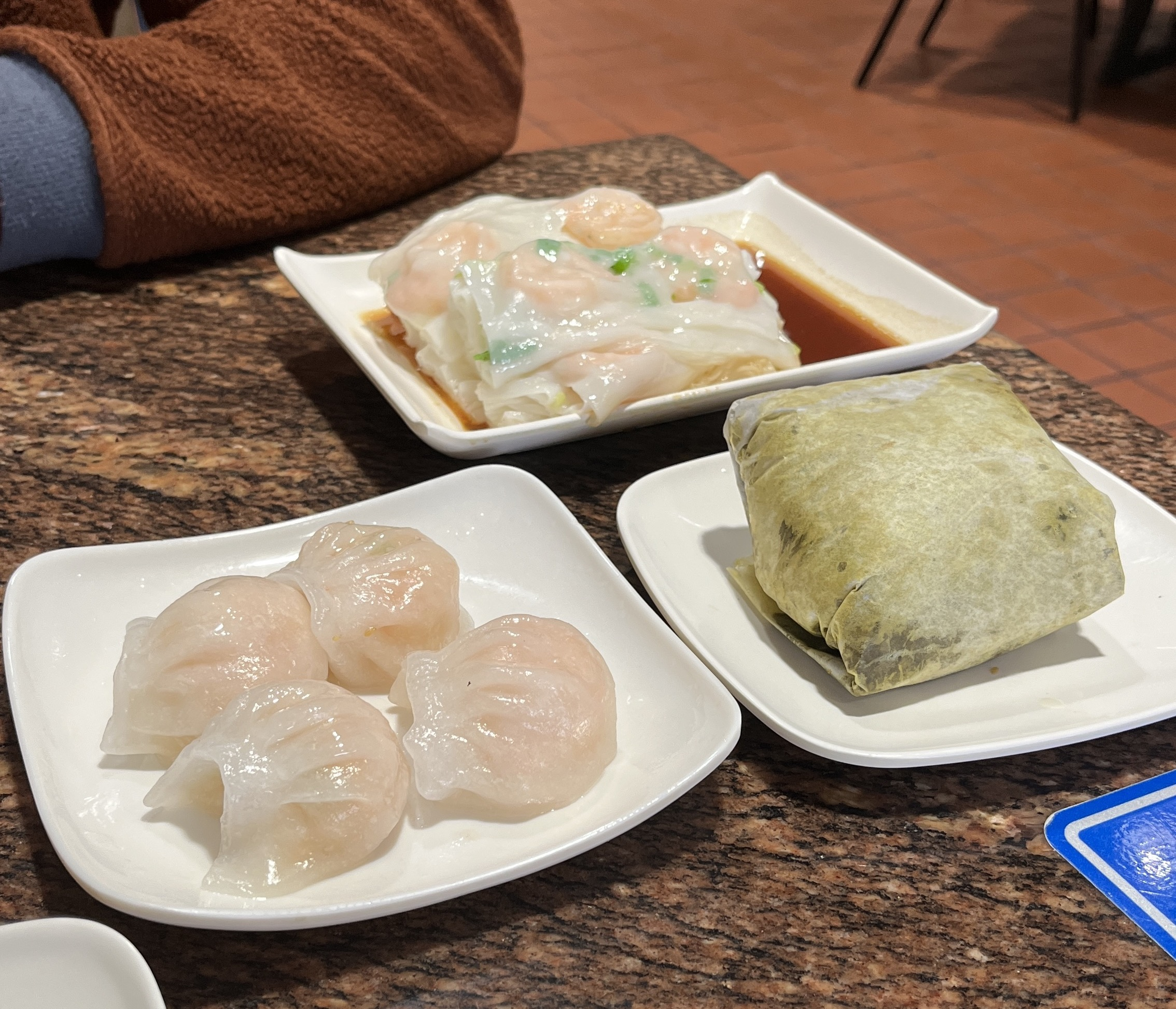
Har gow (bottom left) served at a Chinese restaurant in the Sunset District of San Francisco

== See also ==
- Dim sum
- Shumai
