= History of Chinese Americans in Portland, Oregon =

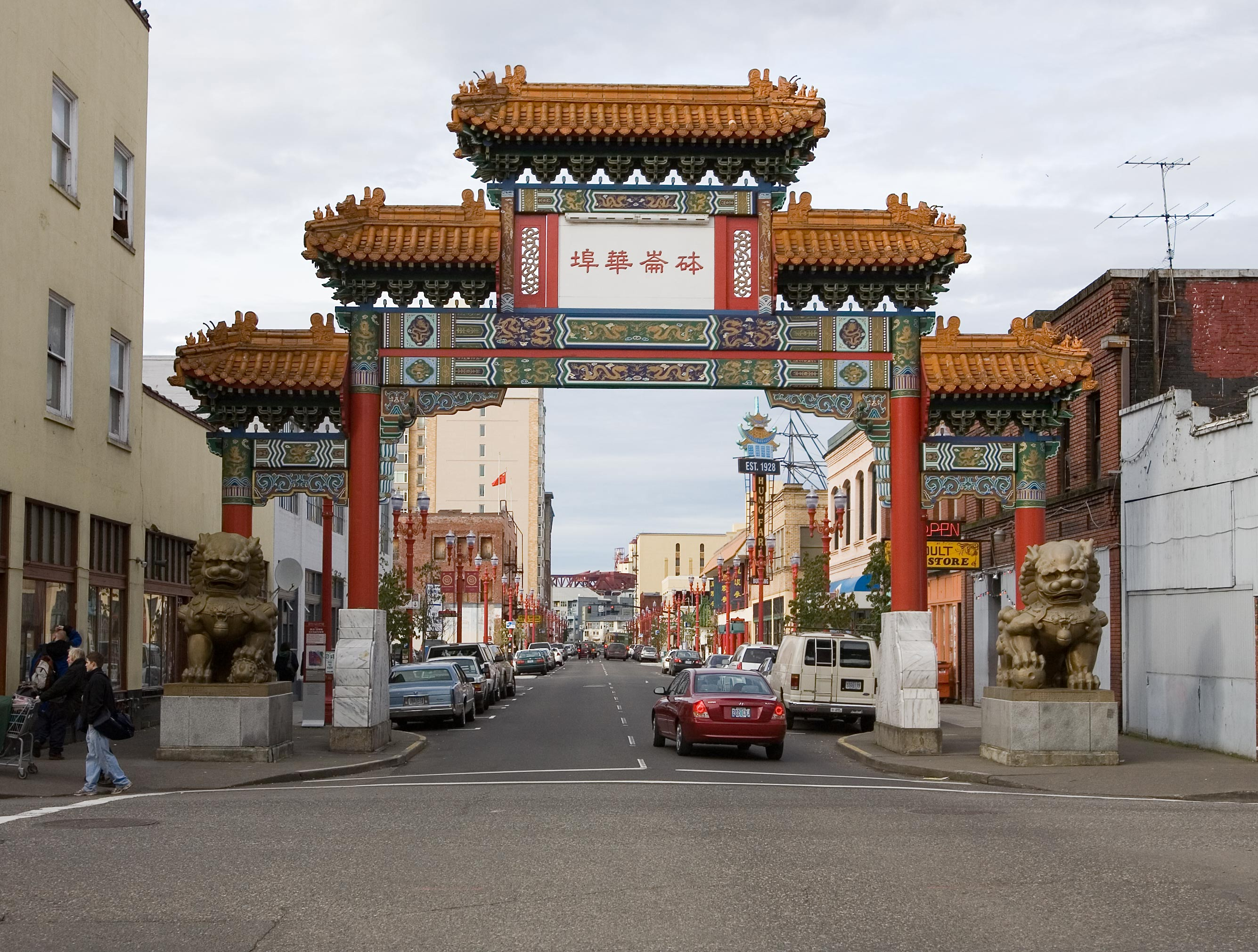
Chinatown Gateway

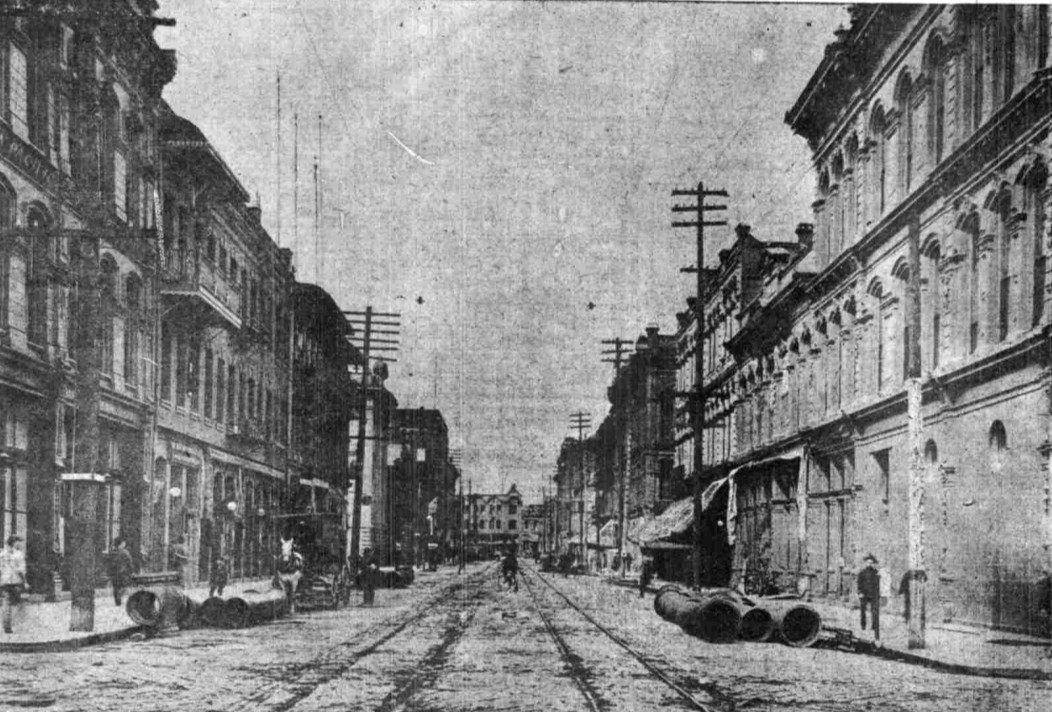
Second Street between Stark and Oak in Chinatown, 1905

According to The Oregonian, 18,000 (7.5 percent) of the Portland metropolitan area's 135,000 Asian/Pacific residents live along 82nd Avenue, in an area dubbed New Chinatown, as of 2012.

Old Town Chinatown features the Lan Su Chinese Garden.

== Organizations ==
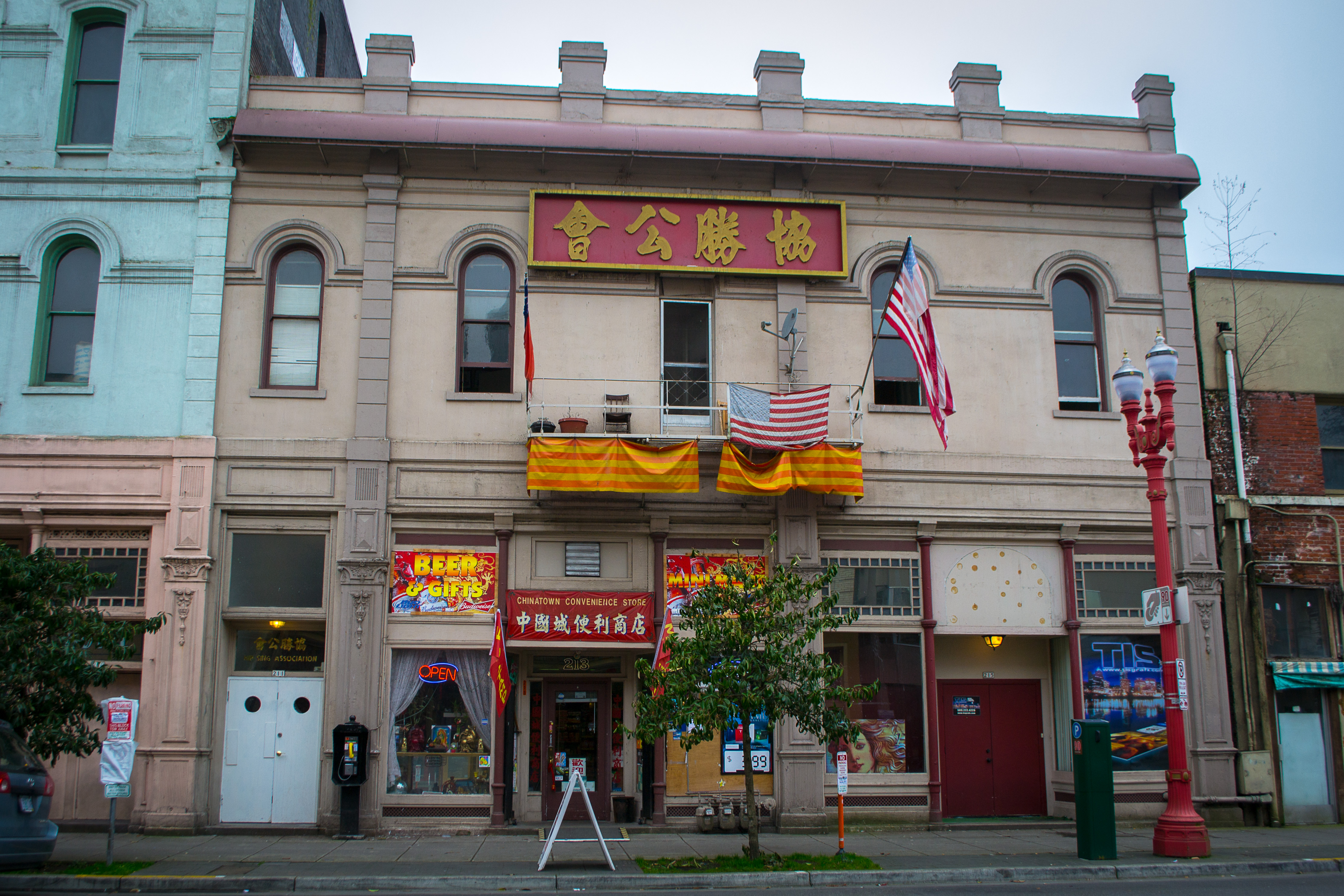
The Hip Sing Tong was a prominent organization

There is a Portland chapter of the Chinese American Citizens Alliance.

The Oregon Chinese Coalition organizes the annual Chinese Festival.

== Restaurants ==
Chinese restaurants have included:

- Ambassador Restaurant and Lounge
- Bing Mi
- Canton Grill
- Chin's Kitchen
- Chinese Village
- Duck House Chinese Restaurant
- Excellent Cuisine
- Fong Chong
- Frank's Noodle House
- Gado Gado
- Happy Dragon Chinese Restaurant
- HK Cafe
- House of Louie
- Hunan Restaurant
- Kenny's Noodle House
- Legin
- Mama Chow's Kitchen (2014)
- Master Kong
- Mei Sum Bakery
- New Cathay
- Ocean City Seafood Restaurant
- The Pagoda
- Republic Cafe and Ming Lounge
- Shandong
- Shanghai's Best
- Stretch the Noodle
- Tasty Corner Chinese Restaurant
- Wei Wei
- Wong's King
- XLB

== See also ==
- Chinese American women's suffrage in Oregon
- Da Tung and Xi'an Bao Bao
- Lunar New Year in Portland, Oregon
- National University of Natural Medicine
- Oregon College of Oriental Medicine
