= Legin (restaurant) =

Defunct Chinese restaurant in Portland, Oregon, U.S.

- Interactive map of Legin

Restaurant information
- Established: 1995
- Closed: 2012
- Food type: Chinese
- Location: 8001 Southeast Division Street, Portland, Multnomah, Oregon, United States
- Coordinates: 45°30′20″N 122°34′52″W

Legin was a Chinese restaurant in Portland, Oregon, United States. It operated from 1995 to 2012.

== Description ==
The restaurant was located at the intersection of Division Street and 82nd Avenue, in the southeast Portland part of the Montavilla neighborhood. It served traditional Chinese cuisine including barbecue duck and dim sum. Willamette Week described the restaurant's interior as "valley-girl 1980s pink".

== History ==
Legin closed in 2012 for the expansion of Portland Community College; it was replaced by the Legin Commons (previously reported as Legin Apartments), which opened in September 2026. The restaurant was documented in Behind the Wok, a digital archive from Asian Pacific American Network of Oregon.

== See also ==
- History of Chinese Americans in Portland, Oregon
- List of Chinese restaurants
- List of defunct restaurants of the United States
