= Canton Grill =

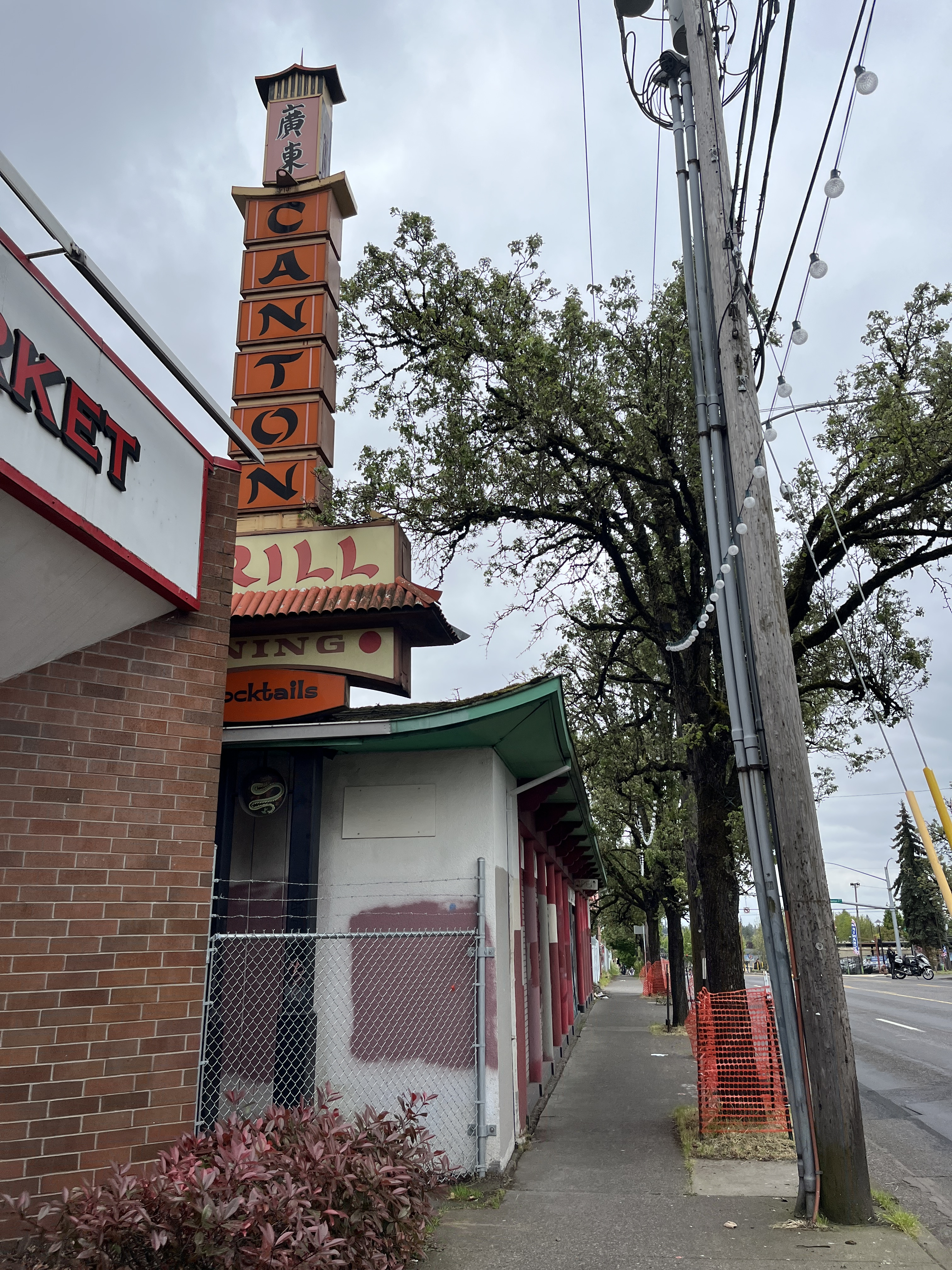
- The building's exterior, 2025
- Interactive map of Canton Grill

Restaurant information
- Established: 1944
- Closed: August 2020
- Food type: American Chinese; Chinese
- Location: 2610 SE 82nd Avenue, Portland, Multnomah, Oregon, United States
- Coordinates: 45°30′15″N 122°34′42″W

Canton Grill was a Chinese restaurant in Portland, Oregon, United States. It operated from 1944 to 2020.

== Description ==
The restaurant Canton Grill served American Chinese cuisine on 82nd Avenue at the intersection with Division Street in southeast Portland's Jade District. The restaurant had a banquet room and an exterior neon sign.

== History ==
Fred Louis Sr. opened Canton Grill in 1944. It was the first Chinese restaurant on 82nd Avenue. The restaurant was renovated in 1967. It closed permanently in August 2020. It was among the oldest American Chinese restaurants in the Portland metropolitan area.

In 2022 and 2023, the Asian Pacific American Network of Oregon purchased the property. The group sought community input for what to do with the site.

== Reception ==
The restaurant was considered an "anchor" to the Chinatown on 82nd Avenue by Heather Arndt Anderson in Portland: A Food Biography (2014).

== See also ==
- History of Chinese Americans in Portland, Oregon
- List of Chinese restaurants
- List of defunct restaurants of the United States
