= Kenny's Noodle House =

Chinese restaurant in Portland, Oregon, U.S.

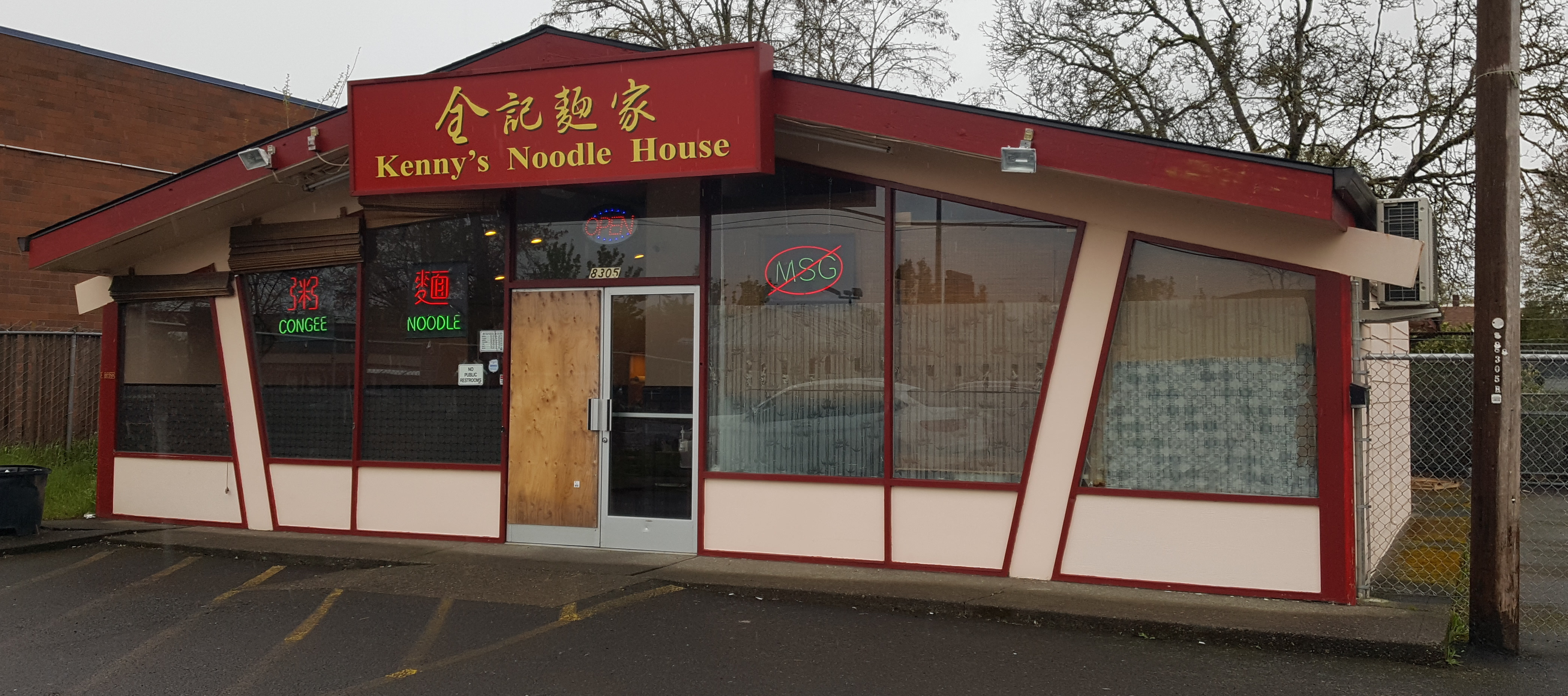
- The restaurant's exterior, 2022
- Interactive map of Kenny's Noodle House

Restaurant information
- Established: 2008
- Food type: Chinese
- Location: 8305 Southeast Powell Boulevard, Portland, Multnomah, Oregon, 97266, United States
- Coordinates: 45.4979°N 122.5775°W
- Website: kennysnoodlehouseor.com

Kenny's Noodle House is a Chinese restaurant in Portland, Oregon, United States.

== Description ==
The Chinese restaurant Kenny's Noodle House operates from a small pink bungalow on Powell Boulevard, near 82nd Avenue in southeast Portland's Powellhurst-Gilbert neighborhood. The menu has included congee, Hong Kong noodles, wonton soup, Chinese broccoli with oyster sauce, and Chinese doughnuts (youtiao). Various noodle soups also include bok choy and pork. Dumplings and vegetables are also on the menu.

== History ==
The restaurant opened in 2008. In 2021, Kenny's participated in Around the World in 82 Dishes, organized by the 82nd Avenue Business District to showcase restaurants along 82nd Avenue.

== Reception ==
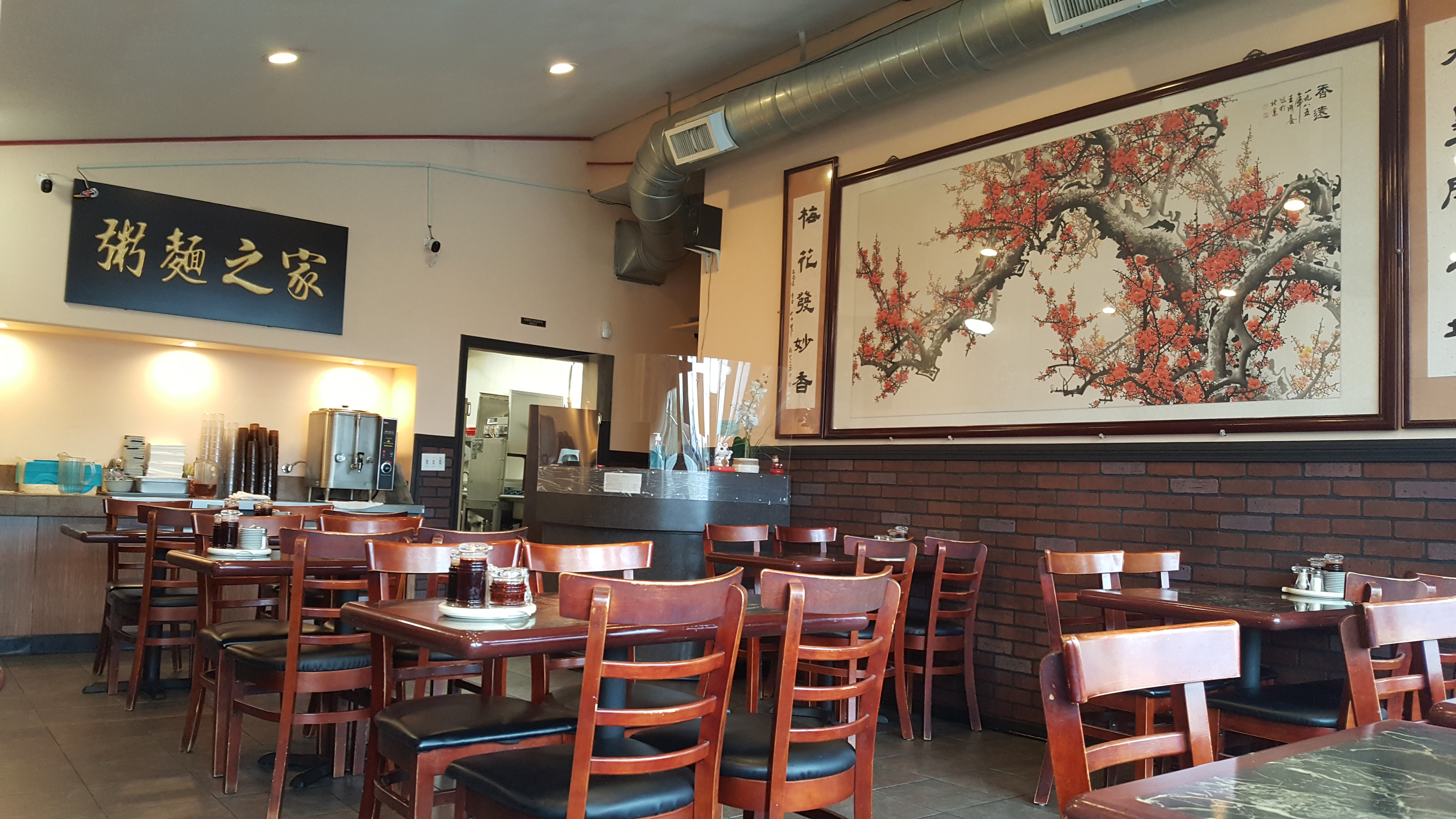
The restaurant's interior, 2022

In 2015, Samantha Bakall of The Oregonian wrote, "You could drive right past Kenny's Noodle House, with its low roof and quiet exterior on the corner of Southeast Powell Boulevard and 83rd Avenue, and never know you just missed some of the best Chinese comfort food in Portland." She called the congee the restaurant's "piece de resistance" and specifically recommended the salted pork and preserved egg congee with youtiao.

Willamette Week's 2016 overview of Portland's best Chinese food said, 'If you speak Cantonese, this place is flat-out famous." The newspaper included the dry oyster and pork congee in a 2018 list of "71 Meals to Put in Your Mouth For Under 15 Dollars". The newspaper's Adrienne So said the congee with rockfish and bok choy was among the best she has had, writing in 2019, "it's as beautiful as a unicorn at midnight. It would bring Keats, dying of tuberculosis, back to life."

Priya Krishna included Kenny's in GQ's 2017 overview of "The Best Places to Get Cheap, Awesome Food in Portland", per local chef Jenn Louis. In 2018, a writer for the Portland Mercury said, "Kenny's Noodle House is a legit choice for Cantonese cuisine with no MSG. When I arrive, most tables are populated by Chinese people speaking their native tongue, which is always a good sign. Service is polite and friendly, and the prices are downright cheap—especially relative to the quality of the food, which is mostly meat dumplings, noodles, and soup. Maybe not the most exciting, but it keeps things simple." Katrina Yentch included the restaurant in Eater Portland's 2022 list of 22 "go-to spots for affordable dining in Portland". Kenny's was also included in the website's 2025 list of the city's best affordable restaurants.

== See also ==
- History of Chinese Americans in Portland, Oregon
- List of Chinese restaurants
