= Chinese Village (restaurant) =

Defunct Chinese restaurant in Portland, Oregon, U.S.

- Interactive map of Chinese Village

Restaurant information
- Chef: Chinese
- Location: 520 SE 82nd Avenue, Portland, Oregon, United States
- Coordinates: 45°31′08″N 122°34′44″W

Chinese Village was a Chinese restaurant in Portland, Oregon, United States.

== Description ==
The Chinese restaurant Chinese Village operated on 82nd Avenue in the southeast Portland part of the Montavilla neighborhood. It had a neon sign. The Oregonian said the restaurant "looks like what Hollywood location scouts must imagine a Chinese restaurant looks like, with blood-red walls, jade-green booths and golden dragons on the wall".

== History and reception ==
The restaurant closed and was demolished in 2018, replaced by Smart Foodservice.

In 2025, Chinese Village was among six American Chinese restaurants in the Jade District featured in the Asian Pacific American Network of Oregon's digital archive Behind the Wok.

== See also ==
- History of Chinese Americans in Portland, Oregon
- List of defunct restaurants of the United States
