= Master Kong (restaurant) =

Chinese restaurant in Portland, Oregon, U.S.

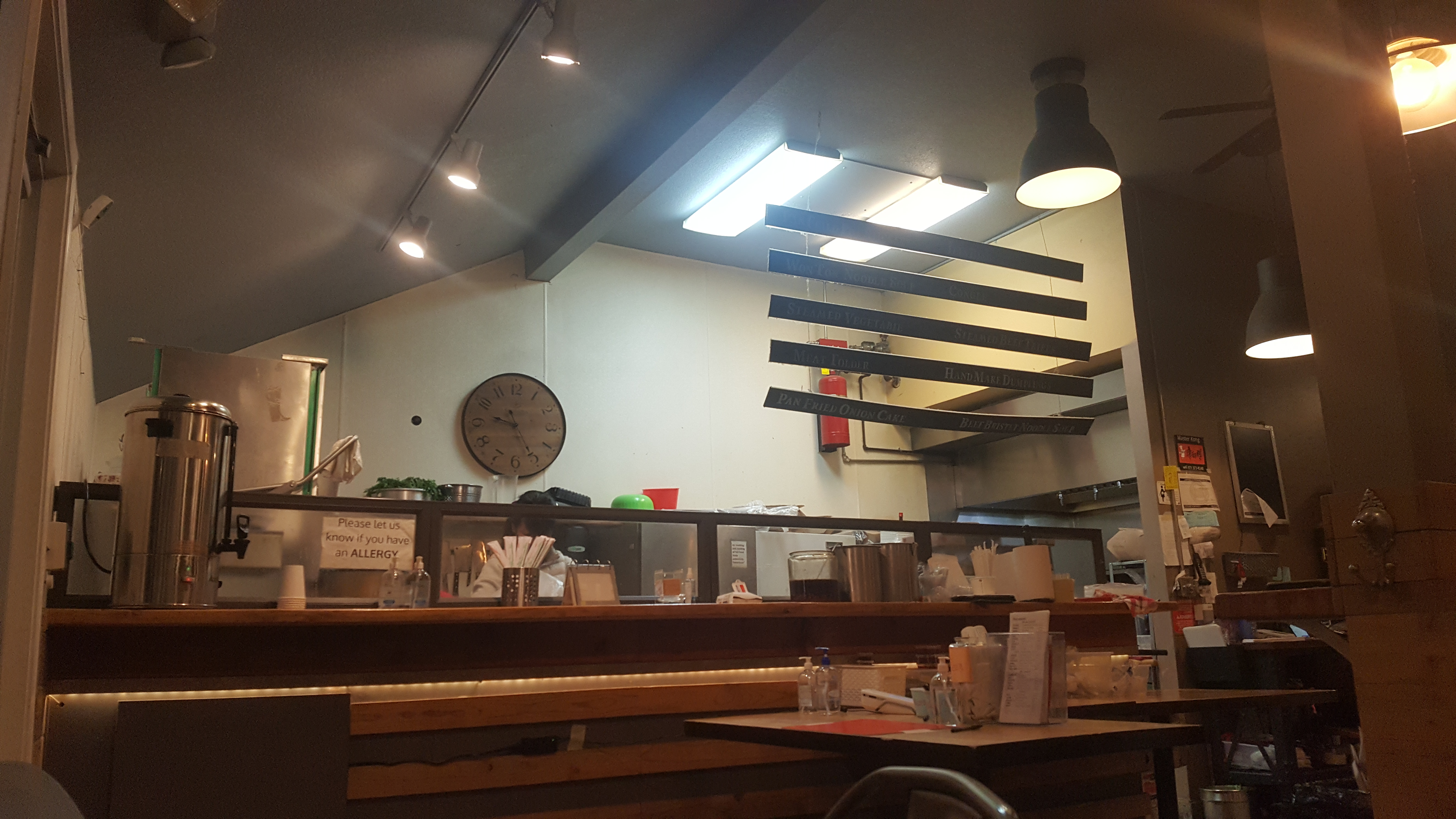
- Interior of the location in Montavilla, Portland, Oregon, in 2022
- Interactive map of Master Kong

Restaurant information
- Established: March 2018
- Food type: Chinese
- Location: Portland, Oregon, United States
- Coordinates: 45.5048°N 122.5758°W
- Seating capacity: 35 (Montavilla)
- Website: masterkongor.com

Master Kong is a Chinese restaurant with two locations in Portland, Oregon, United States. The business operates in southeast Portland, in the Montavilla and Richmond neighborhoods.

== Description ==
Master Kong serves Chinese cuisine at two locations in southeast Portland. The original 35-seat restaurant operates in a house on Division Street in the Montavilla neighborhood, and a second location on 32nd Avenue operates in the Richmond neighborhood. The menu has included buns, congee, dumplings, and jianbing.

== History ==
The original restaurant opened in March 2018. The second location opened in early November 2022.

== Reception ==
In 2018, Master Kong was named Willamette Week's Newcomer of the Year, and was nominated for Restaurant of the Year by Eater Portland's Eater Awards. Michael Russell included Master Kong in The Oregonian's 2018 list of Portland's 10 best new restaurants, as well as the newspaper's 2019 and 2020 lists of the city's 40 best inexpensive restaurants.

Master Kong was a runner-up in the Best Chinese Restaurant category of Willamette Week's annual 'Best of Portland' readers' poll in 2024. It was a finalist in the same category in 2025. The Meat Folder was included in Willamette Week's 2026 list of the city's best "cheap eats".

Master Kong was included in Eater Portland's 2025 list of Portland's best affordable restaurants.

== See also ==
- History of Chinese Americans in Portland, Oregon
- List of Chinese restaurants
- List of restaurant chains in the United States
