= Tasty Corner Chinese Restaurant =

Restaurant in Portland, Oregon, U.S.

- Interactive map of Tasty Corner Chinese Restaurant

Restaurant information
- Established: June 2022
- Owner: Daniel Chen
- Food type: Chinese
- Location: 624 Southwest Hall Street, Portland, Multnomah, Oregon, 97201, United States
- Coordinates: 45.5103°N 122.6837°W

Tasty Corner Chinese Restaurant, or simply Tasty Corner, is a Chinese restaurant in Portland, Oregon, United States.

== Description ==
Tasty Corner is a Sichuan-focused Chinese restaurant in southwest Portland, near Portland State University. It has large windows and has been described as a sibling establishment to Hillsboro's Szechuan Garden. Tasty Corner's menu includes chongqing chicken, deep-fried shrimp, egg rolls, cumin lamb, dumplings, mapo tofu, crispy and hand-shaved noodles, dandan noodles, and noodle soups with braised brisket and wonton. Tasty Corner also has American Chinese dishes like General Tso's chicken, broccoli beef, and honey-walnut shrimp.

== History ==
Daniel Chen, who co-owns Szechuan Garden, opened Tasty Corner in June 2022, in the space that previously housed the Taiwanese restaurant Chit Chat Cafe. The restaurant hosted a dinner for Lunar New Year in 2025.

== Reception ==
Tasty Corner was included in overviews of the city's best Chinese food by Katherine Chew Hamilton of Portland Monthly in 2022, as well as Seiji Nanbu, Janey Wong, and Rebecca Roland of Eater Portland in 2024. In 2023, Wong also said Tasty Corner was "likely Portland's best" restaurant for mapo tofu. Additionally, Nanbu and Thom Hilton included the restaurant in the website's list of sixteen "delectable" dumpling restaurants in the Portland metropolitan area, and Brooke Jackson-Glidden recommended the business for "outstanding" take-out and delivery options. Roland also included Tasty Corner in Eater Portland's 2024 overview of downtown Portland's best restaurants.

In 2022, Michael Russell of The Oregonian included Tasty Corner in a list of the city's 25 best new restaurants. He also called Tasty Corner the "best new Portland State University-adjacent" Chinese restaurant. He also ranked the business number 39 in the newspaper's 2024 list of Portland's 40 best restaurants, recommending the mapo tofu, the dried pot pork ribs, and the hand-shaved noodles. In a list of the 18 best restaurants in downtown Portland, Fodor's said: "College students, local workers, tourists, and fans of authentic Chinese food pile into this brightly lighted, unfussy restaurant to indulge in heaping platters of hot-and-spicy crawfish, cumin lamb, crispy chicken with hot garlic sauce, and braised beef brisket noodle soup. Although the menu draws on all different regions of China, the Sichuan fare is especially good."

== See also ==
- History of Chinese Americans in Portland, Oregon
- List of Chinese restaurants
