= New Cathay =

Defunct restaurant in Portland, Oregon, U.S.

- Interactive map of New Cathay

Restaurant information
- Food type: American; American Chinese; Chinese
- Location: Portland, Multnomah, Oregon, United States
- Coordinates: 45.5050°N 122.5782°W

New Cathay was a restaurant in Portland, Oregon, United States.

== Description ==
The restaurant New Cathay operated at the intersection of 82nd Avenue and Division Street in southeast Portland. It served Chinese, American, and American Chinese cuisine.

== History ==
On January 1, 1939, The Oregonian reported on the completion of the building. New Cathay was granted a restaurant license in mid 1939.

The restaurant operated until 1987. Bob K. Louie was an owner. Eddie Chong Louie, Frank Kee Chinn, John K. Chinn, and Yin K. Leong have also been credited as owners.

A burglar stole $150 from the restaurant in 1949. In 1949, a fire destroyed a shed adjoining the restaurant.

The restaurant served as a gathering place for community groups such as the Montavilla Kiwanis club and Oregon Poultry and Pet Stock Association in 1939, American Legion and Pepco Unit No. 104 in 1950, Searchlight and Timberline Toastmistress clubs in 1955, Disabled American Veterans in 1959, the Oregon Association of Homes for the Aged in 1964, and the Thread, Needle and Thimble club in 1965.

In March 1966, burglars stoles $1,700 from the restaurant's safe. The restaurant was burglarized again in July, resulting in the arrest of two men. Both men pleaded guilty. In 1978, two Mt. Hood Community College and TriMet officials were arrested for theft and other charges after leaving the restaurant without paying.

In 1985, employees of New Cathay rejected a proposal by Local 9 of the Hotel Employees and Restaurant Employees Union to be the group's bargaining representative. In 1986, the restaurant was among businesses who donated food to feed 50 children at an annual Christmas celebration hosted by the 82nd Avenue Business Association.

== Reception ==
New Cathay was described as an "anchor" of the Chinatown on 82nd Avenue by Heather Arndt Anderson in the book Portland: A Food Biography (2014). The business was among six American Chinese restaurants on 82nd Avenue featured in the Asian Pacific American Network of Oregon's digital archive Behind the Wok in 2025.

== See also ==
- History of Chinese Americans in Portland, Oregon
- List of Chinese restaurants
- List of defunct restaurants of the United States
