= The Pagoda (restaurant) =

Defunct Chinese restaurant in Portland, Oregon, U.S.

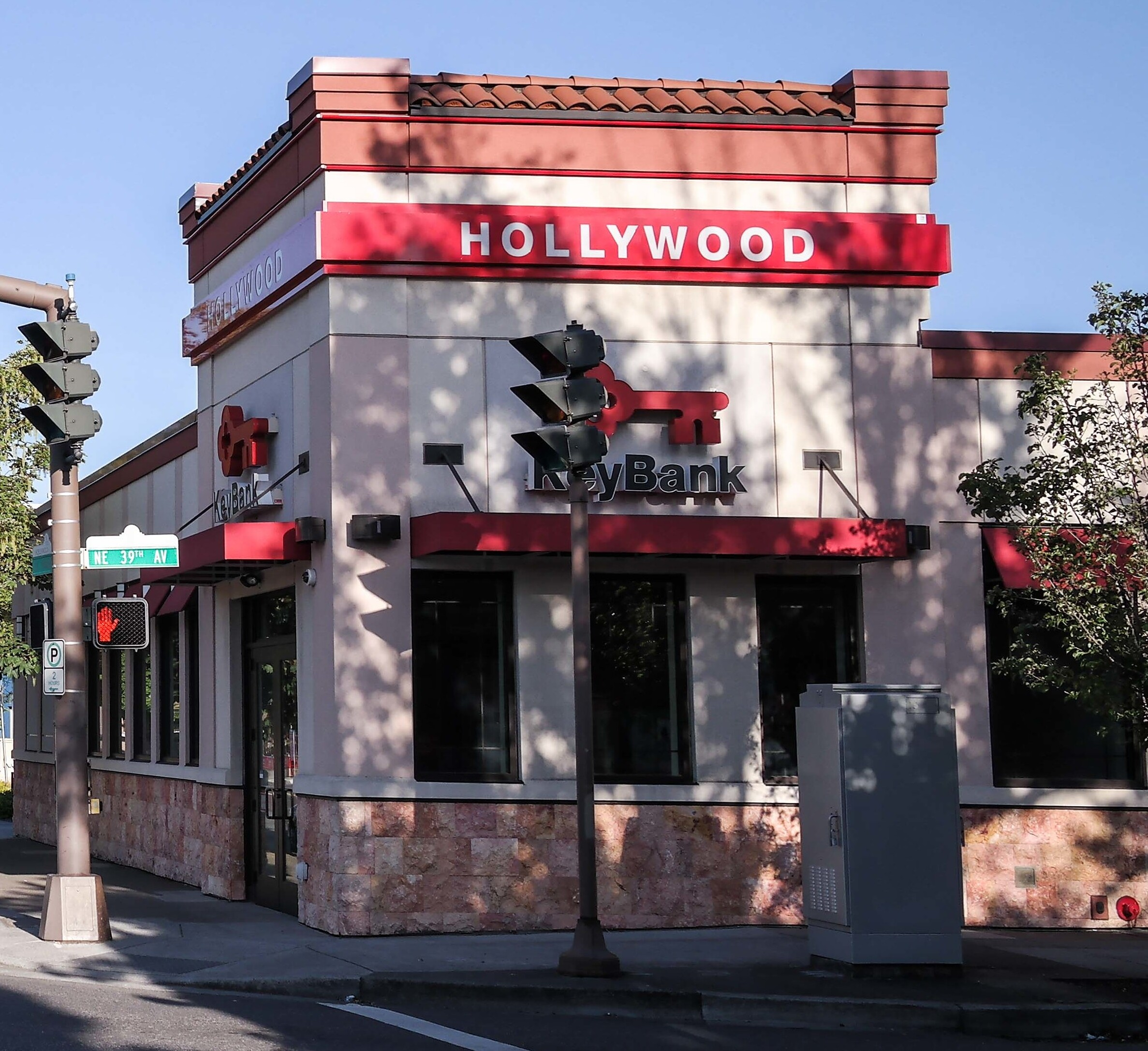
- Exterior of a bank building in 2014; previously, the structure housed The Pagoda
- Interactive map of The Pagoda

Restaurant information
- Established: 1940
- Closed: 2008
- Owners: Louis Lee (1946–2008); Sunny Chan (2008)
- Food type: Chinese
- Location: 3839 Northeast Broadway Street, Portland, Oregon, United States
- Coordinates: 45°32′7.3″N 122°37′23.6″W

The Pagoda was a Chinese restaurant in Portland, Oregon's Hollywood District, in the United States.

== Description ==
The Pagoda was a Chinese restaurant in northeast Portland's Hollywood neighborhood. The business was housed in an "ornate, orange-tiled" building, with an exterior described as "unique" by Nathalie Weinstein of the Daily Journal of Commerce. The interior had koi pond with a small bridge for guests to cross.

== History ==
The restaurant opened in 1940. Louis Lee purchased the business in 1946. Lee operated the restaurant until 2008, when Sunny Chan took over. The Pagoda closed in late 2008, and the building was converted into a Key Bank branch. The restaurant's gold-and-red arch was salvaged and installed at the Expatriate.

== See also ==
- History of Chinese Americans in Portland, Oregon
- List of Chinese restaurants
