= On Hing & Brothers Store =

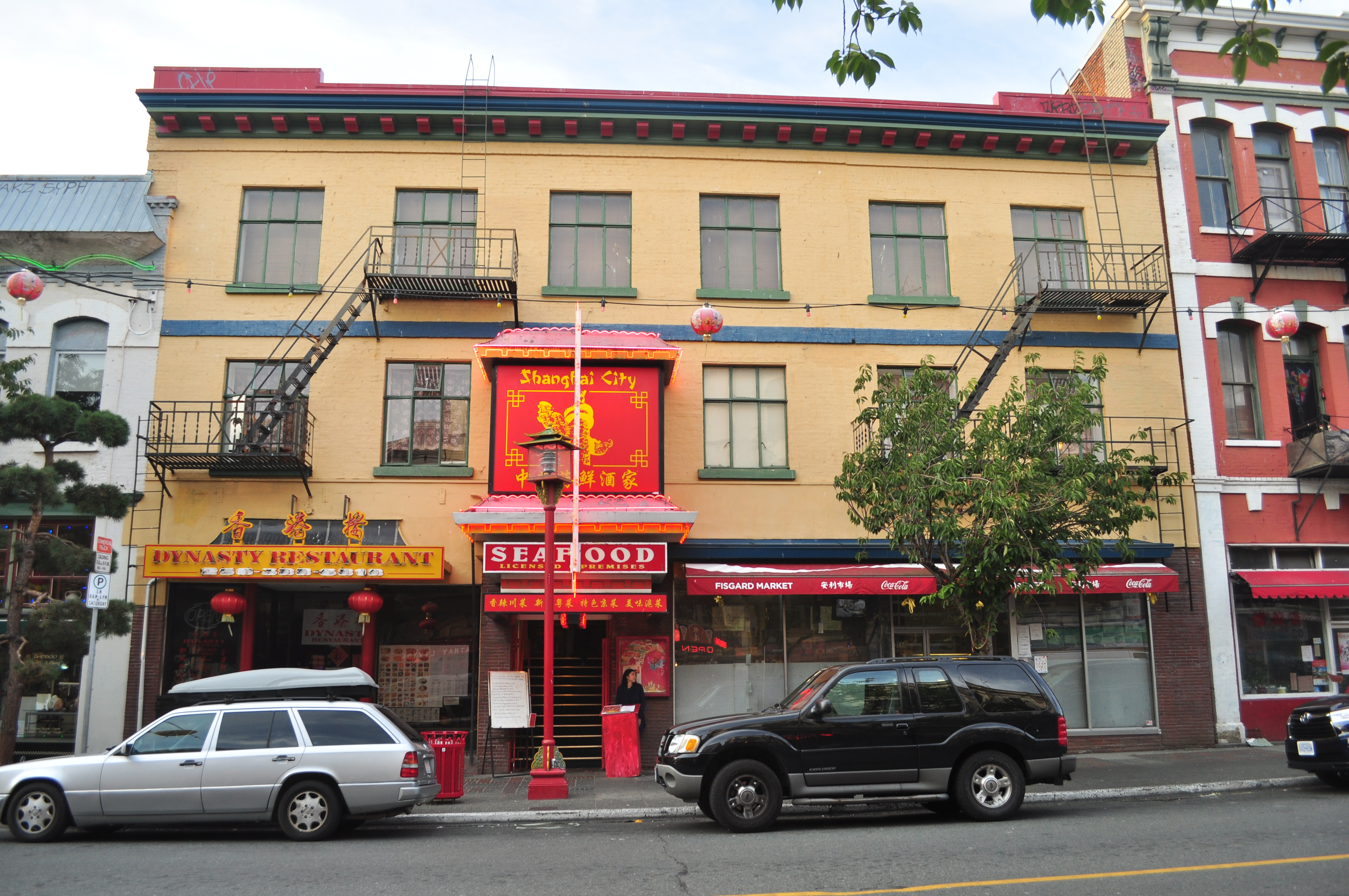
- The building's exterior in 2015
- Interactive map of the On Hing & Brothers Store area

General information
- Location: 546-52 Fisgard Street, Victoria, British Columbia, Canada
- Coordinates: 48.4295°N 123.3679°W
- Topped-out: 1882
- Completed: 1913
- Opened: 1914

Technical details
- Floor count: 4 (3 Functional)

The On Hing & Brothers Store is an historic building in Victoria, British Columbia, Canada. It houses a Chinese restaurant and Chinese grocery store. It has 4 floors in total including the roof, but 3 are only habitable. It was built in 1882, but the original one was demolished. However, it was rebuilt in 1914.

== See also ==
- List of historic places in Victoria, British Columbia
