= Duck House Chinese Restaurant =

Chinese restaurant in Portland, Oregon, U.S.

- The restaurant's exterior in 2026
- Interactive map of Duck House Chinese Restaurant

Restaurant information
- Established: 2016
- Food type: Chinese
- Location: 1968 Southwest 5th Avenue, Portland, Multnomah, Oregon, 97201, United States
- Coordinates: 45.5093°N 122.6825°W
- Seating capacity: 100

Duck House Chinese Restaurant, or simply Duck House, is a Chinese restaurant in Portland, Oregon, in the United States. The 100-seat restaurant opened in 2016.

== Reception ==
The business was included in Eater Portland's 2022 overview of "Where to Eat and Drink in Downtown Portland". The business was included in Time Out Portland's 2025 list of the city's eighteen best restaurants.

Duck House ranked second in Best Chinese Restaurant category of Willamette Week's annual 'Best of Portland' readers' poll in 2022. It won in the same category in 2024 and 2025.

== See also ==
- List of Chinese restaurants
- History of Chinese Americans in Portland, Oregon
