= 82nd Avenue of Roses Parade =

Annual event in Portland, Oregon

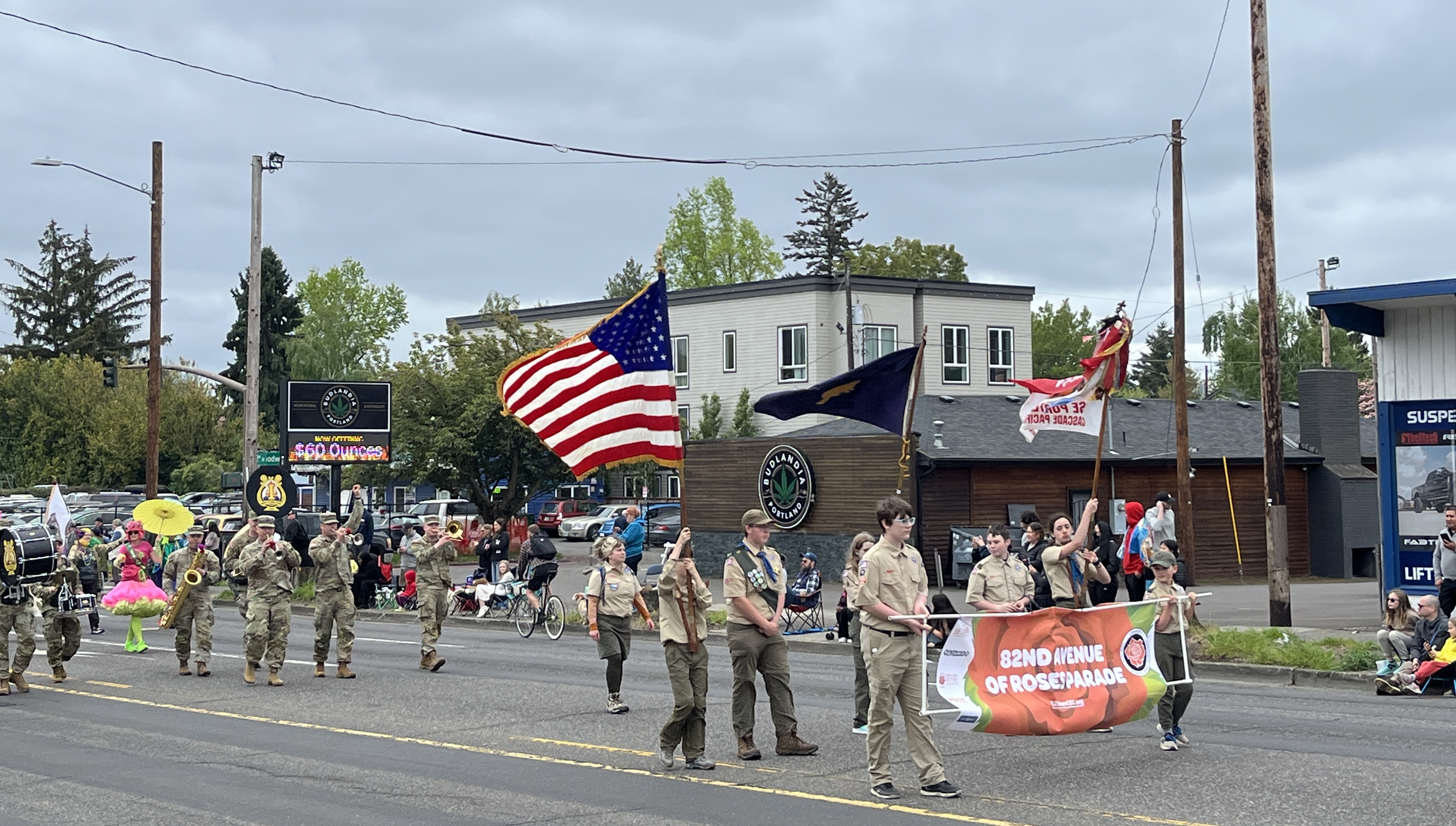
- Parade participants starting the event in 2025
- Status: Active
- Genre: Parade
- Frequency: Last Saturday in April
- Venue: 82nd Avenue ("Avenue of the Roses")
- Location: Portland, Oregon
- Coordinates: 45.49829°N 122.57872°W
- Years active: 18–19
- Inaugurated: 2007
- Most recent: April 26, 2025; 18 months ago
- Next event: April 25, 2026; 6 months ago
- Participants: 525
- Attendance: 2,100
- Website: 82rosescec.com

The 82nd Avenue of Roses Parade is an annual event in Portland, Oregon, United States, established in 2007. The parade is organized by the 82nd Avenue of Roses Business Association, part of a local business group called Venture Portland, as an effort to build community and improve 82nd Avenue's image.

== History ==
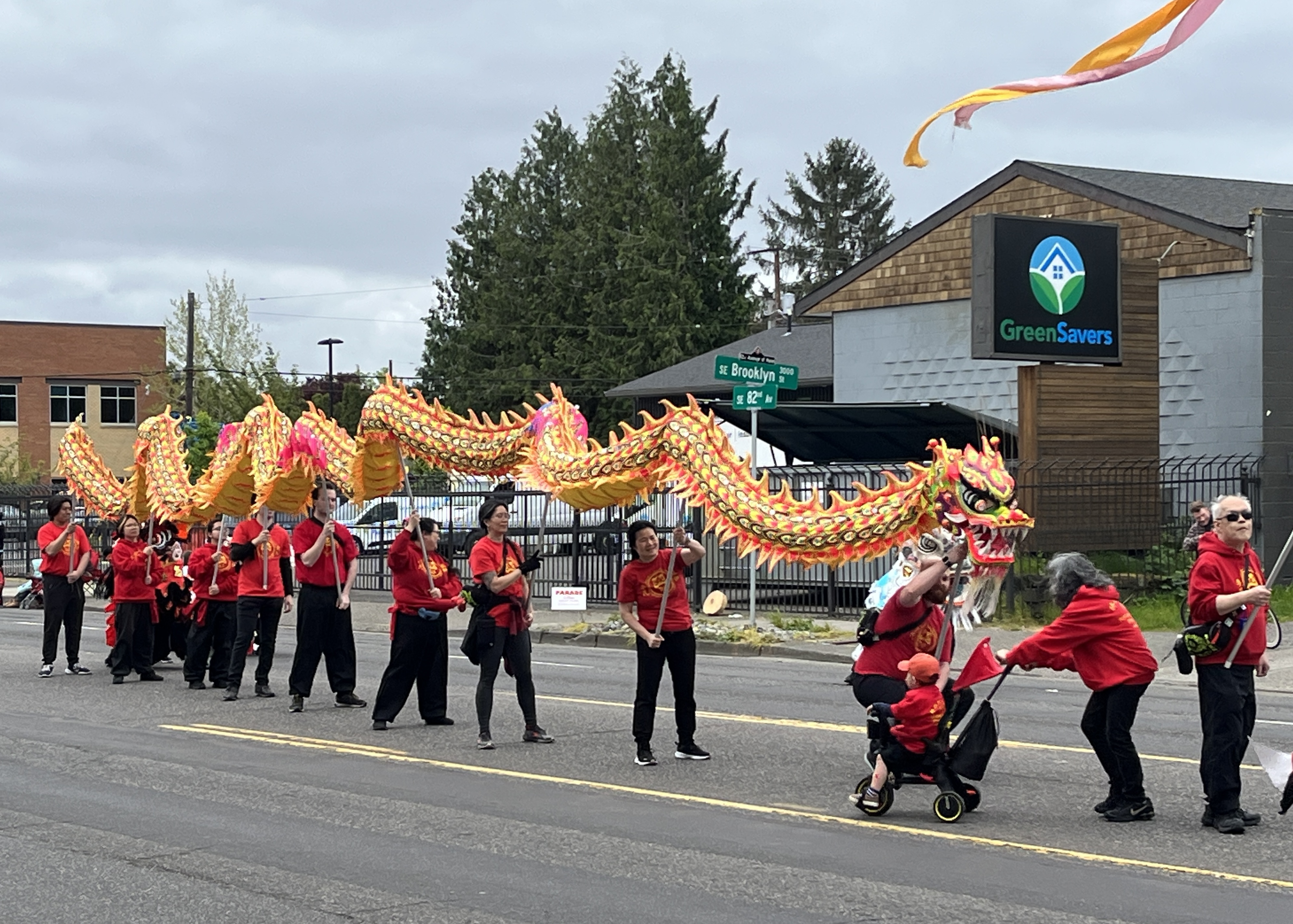
The parade in 2025

The parade kicked off the Portland Rose Festival starting in 2007.

In 2017, the parade was cancelled when the 82nd Avenue of Roses Business Association announced that there were "threats of violence during the parade by multiple groups planning to demonstrate at the event." A Multnomah County Republican Party group planned to participate in the parade, announcing their participation with a Facebook event "chastising left-leaning protests." This was followed by allegations that local "antifa" groups would disrupt the Republican group's participation in the parade and that other right-wing groups would try to stop the leftist disruption.

The 2019 parade was on 27 April, and started at the Eastport Plaza. It's Portland's largest east side parade, consisting of 55-60 entries including floats, bands, classic automobiles, and various marching groups. The COVID-19 pandemic caused the parade to go on hiatus from 2020 through 2022, but resumed in 2023 and was livestreamed on KATU-TV for the first time. The route was shortened for the 2025 event.

Hundreds of people watched the 2026 parade. Activities in 2026 included bingo, a carnival, and skateboarding.

== See also ==
- Culture of Portland, Oregon
