= Montavilla Park =

Public park in Portland, Oregon, U.S.

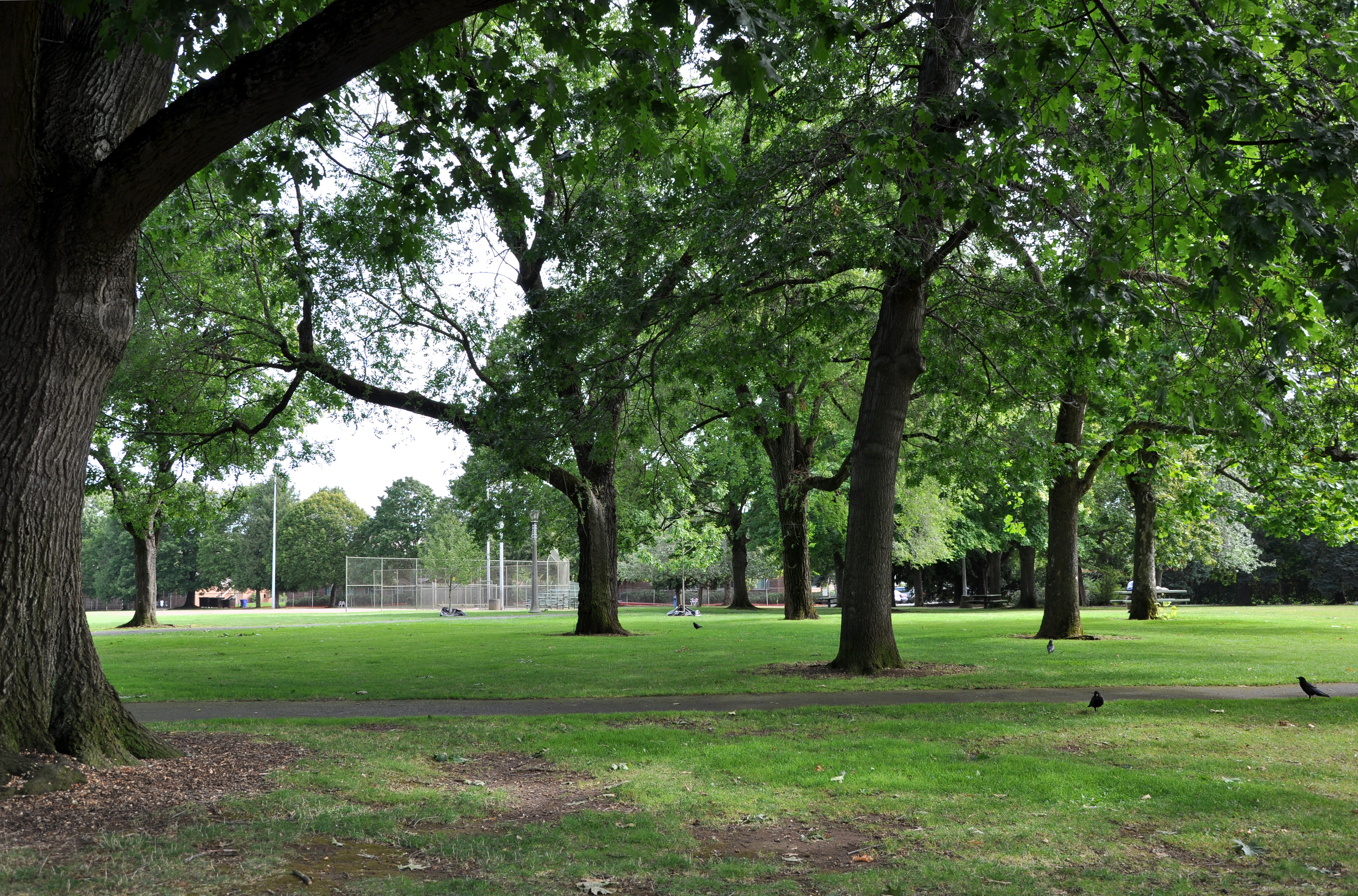
- Part of the park in 2010

- Location within Oregon
- Location: NE 82nd Ave. and Glisan St. Portland, Oregon
- Coordinates: 45°31′42″N 122°34′41″W
- Area: 9.48 acres (3.84 ha)
- Operator: Portland Parks & Recreation

Montavilla Park is a 9.48-acre (3.84 ha) public park in Portland, Oregon's Montavilla neighborhood, in the United States. The park is located on the corner of 82nd Avenue and Glisan Street, adjacent to Multnomah University.

== History ==
The park was acquired in 1921. Within the park's boundaries, the Montavilla Community Center and the Montavilla Outdoor Pool were constructed in the 1920s. Over subsequent years, the community center building experienced several renovations and expansions.

== Features ==
Montavilla Park includes the Montavilla Community Center, an outdoor pool, a children's playground, and a futsal field. The Portland Timbers Field was added to the park in 2014, which was partially funded by the Portland Timbers.

== Events ==
Activist Joey Gibson has hosted a free speech rally in the park.
