= Frank's Noodle House =

Chinese restaurant in the U.S. state of Oregon

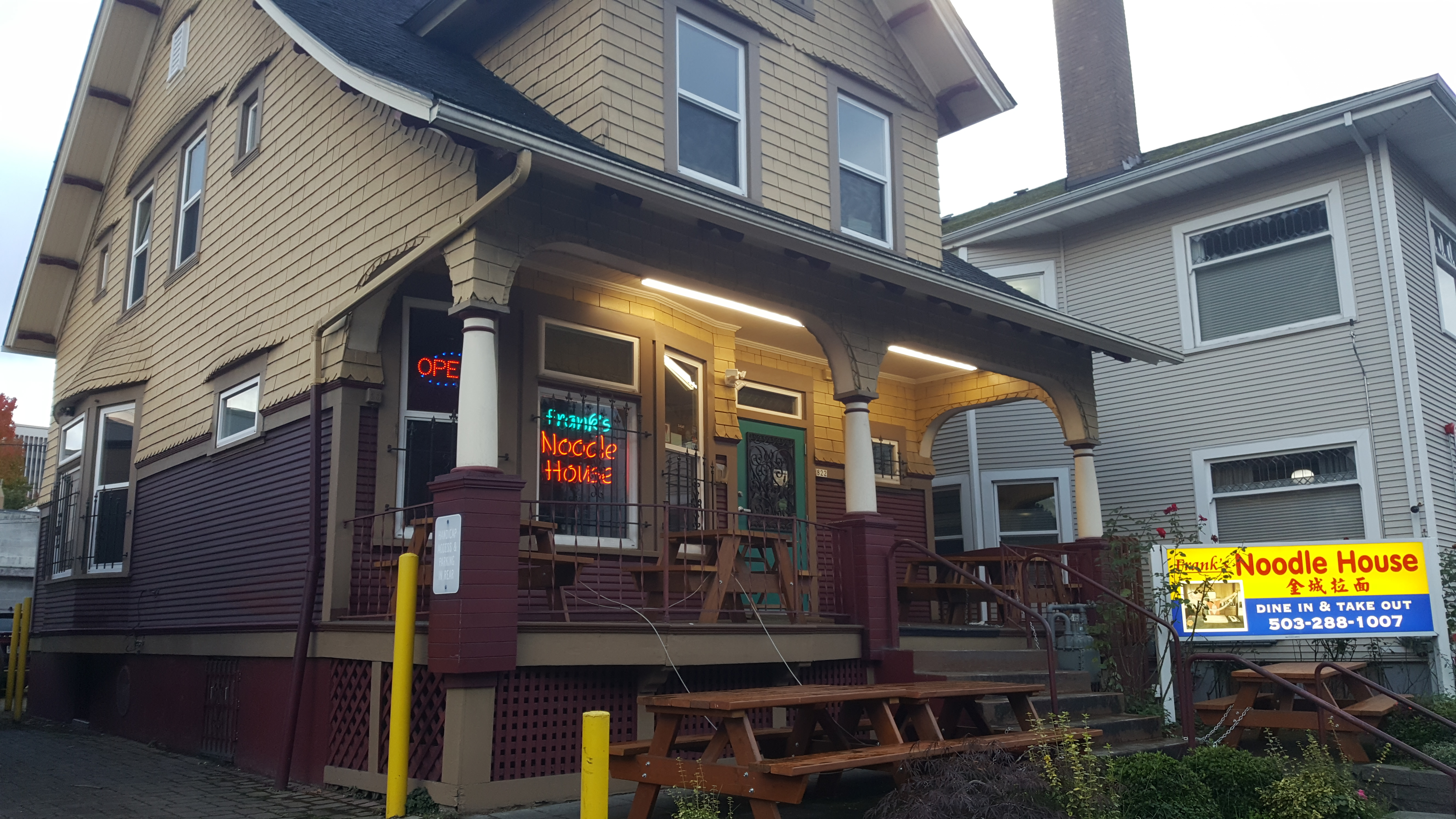
- Exterior of the original restaurant in northeast Portland in 2021
- Interactive map of Frank's Noodle House

Restaurant information
- Owners: Frank Fong; Ying Jun Gao
- Food type: Chinese
- Location: Portland; Beaverton, Oregon, United States
- Coordinates: 45.53489°N 122.65702°W
- Website: franksnoodlehousepdx.com

Frank's Noodle House is a Chinese restaurant with two locations in the Portland, Oregon metropolitan area, in the United States. The original restaurant opened in northeast Portland and a second operates in Beaverton. A third location opened in northwest Portland's Pearl District in 2025.

== Description ==
The original Frank's Noodle House is located on Northeast Broadway, in a converted house with a salmon-colored dining room near the Lloyd Center. The menu includes appetizers, kimchi, and noodles, including curry noodles, Lanzhou-style hand-pulled noodles, and biangbiang noodles. Other "Chinese-American standards" include Mongolian beef and orange chicken.

The restaurant in Beaverton is twice as large and has an expanded menu.

== History ==
The restaurants are owned by Frank Fong and Ying Jun Gao. Frank's has appeared on the Food Network's Diners, Drive-Ins, and Dives.

A third location opened in northwest Portland's Pearl District in 2025.

The restaurant participated in Portland's Dumpling Week in 2026.

== Reception ==
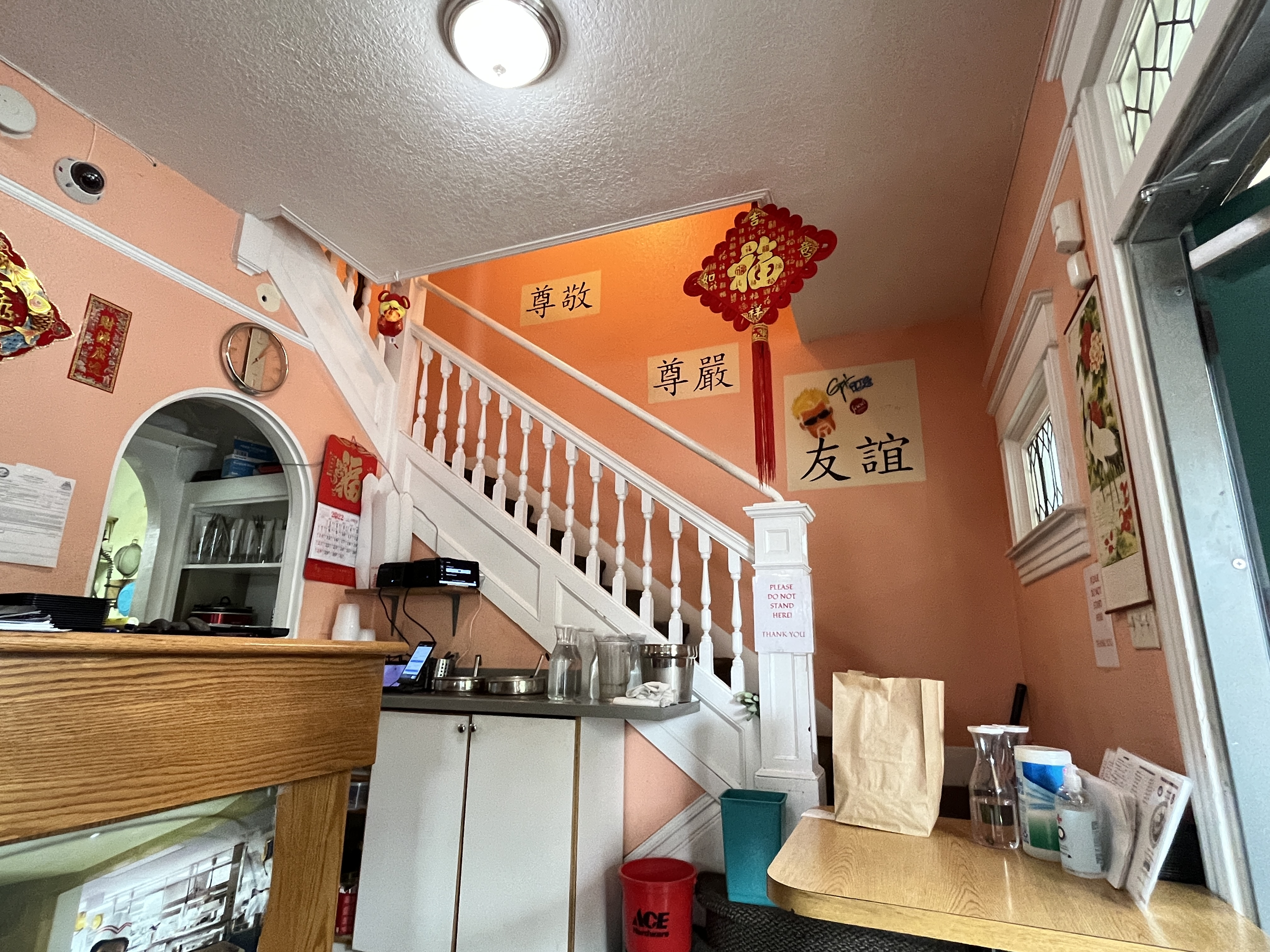
The restaurant's interior, 2022

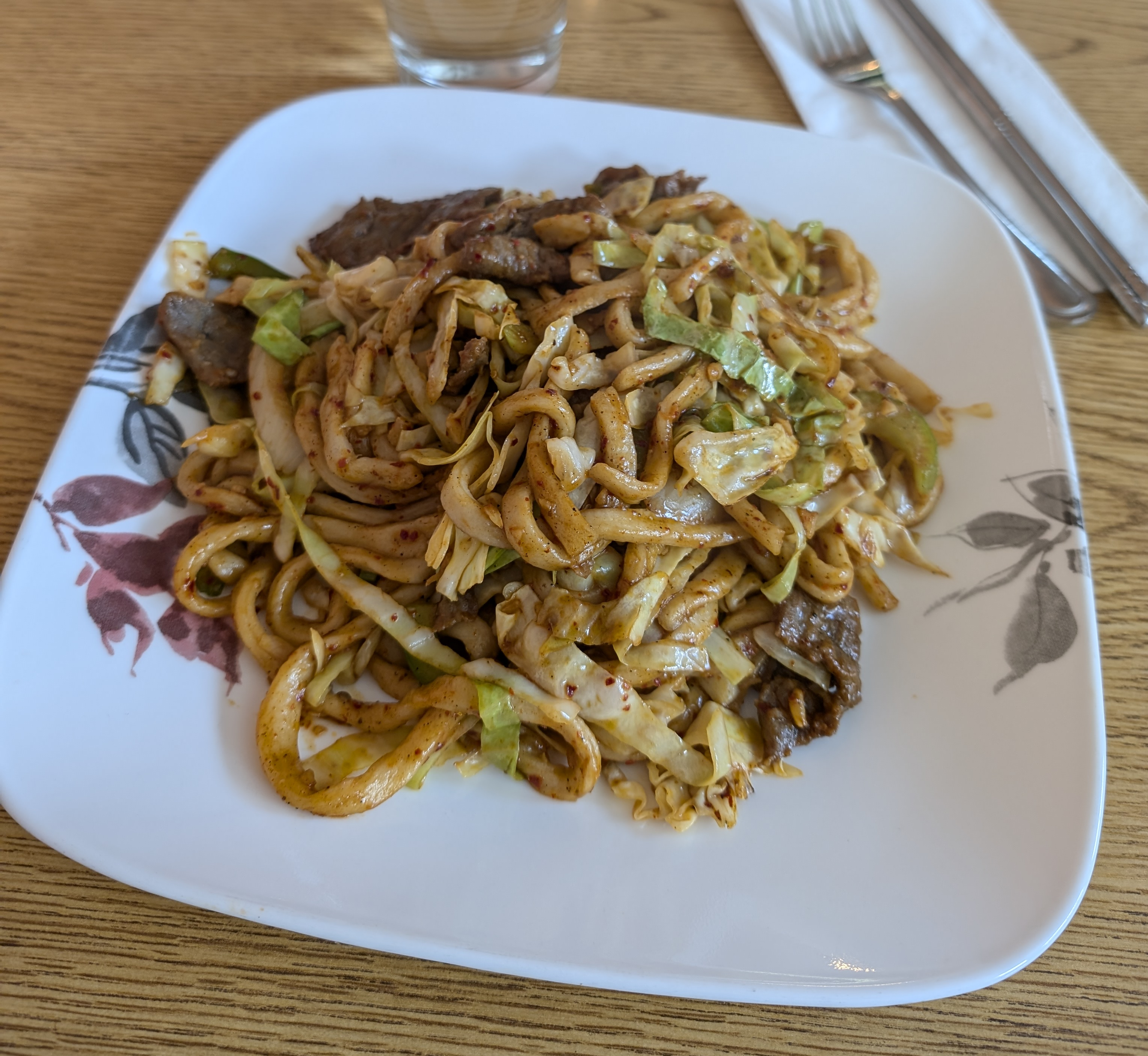
Beef stir-fried noodles served at the restaurant

Willamette Week said in 2016, "Beware that waits can be long, there's little room to wait inside, and some of the appetizers aren't worth the scratch. But if you want fresh noodles, this is the spot." The newspaper included the black bean noodles in a 2018 list of "Our Favorite Noodle Bowls and Plates in Portland for Less than $15" and said the "thick, twisty, rugged noodles bathed in a rich black bean sauce remain one of the city's purest comforts. The sauce is sticky but not sweet, an umami-dense and tangy bath that pairs so perfectly with the dough under it. This is comfort food in every sense".

In 2018, Michael Russell ranked the Portland and Beaverton restaurants number five and number eight, respectively, on The Oregonian's list of the city's best hand-pulled noodles. Frank's won in the Best Chinese Restaurant category of Willamette Week's annual 'Best of Portland' readers' poll in 2020.

== See also ==
- List of Chinese restaurants
- List of Diners, Drive-Ins and Dives episodes
- List of restaurant chains in the United States
