= Heart Beacon =

Sculpture in Portland, Oregon

- The sculpture in 2020
- Artist: Blessing Hancock; Joe O'Connell
- Year: 2013
- Type: Sculpture
- Medium: Stainless steel; acrylic panels; electrical components
- Location: Portland, Oregon, United States; 45.49442°N 122.56078°W

Heart Beacon is an outdoor 2013 sculpture by American artists Blessing Hancock and Joe O'Connell, installed at the Bureau of Emergency Management's Emergency Coordination Center in Portland, Oregon, United States.

== Description ==
Heart Beacon, installed at the Emergency Coordination Center (3732 Southeast 99th Avenue or 9911 Southeast Bush Street) in Portland's Lents and Powellhurst-Gilbert neighborhoods, has been described as a "pulsing blue egg"; the artists have called it an "interactive enclosure of light, color and sound that senses and artistically displays the heartbeat of visitors". It is made of stainless steel, acrylic panels, and electrical components, and measures 18' 1 7/8" x 10' 5". The sculpture cost $220,333 and was funded by the city's Percent for Art program. According to the Regional Arts & Culture Council, which administers the work, Heart Beacon "takes the literal and metamorphic 'pulse'" of Portland's community and serves as a "symbol of hope and a potent reminder of the resilience of the individual taking inspiration from the life-saving mission" of the center.

== See also ==
- 2013 in art
- Interactive art
- Sound sculpture
