= Chin's Kitchen =

Chinese restaurant in Portland, Oregon, U.S.

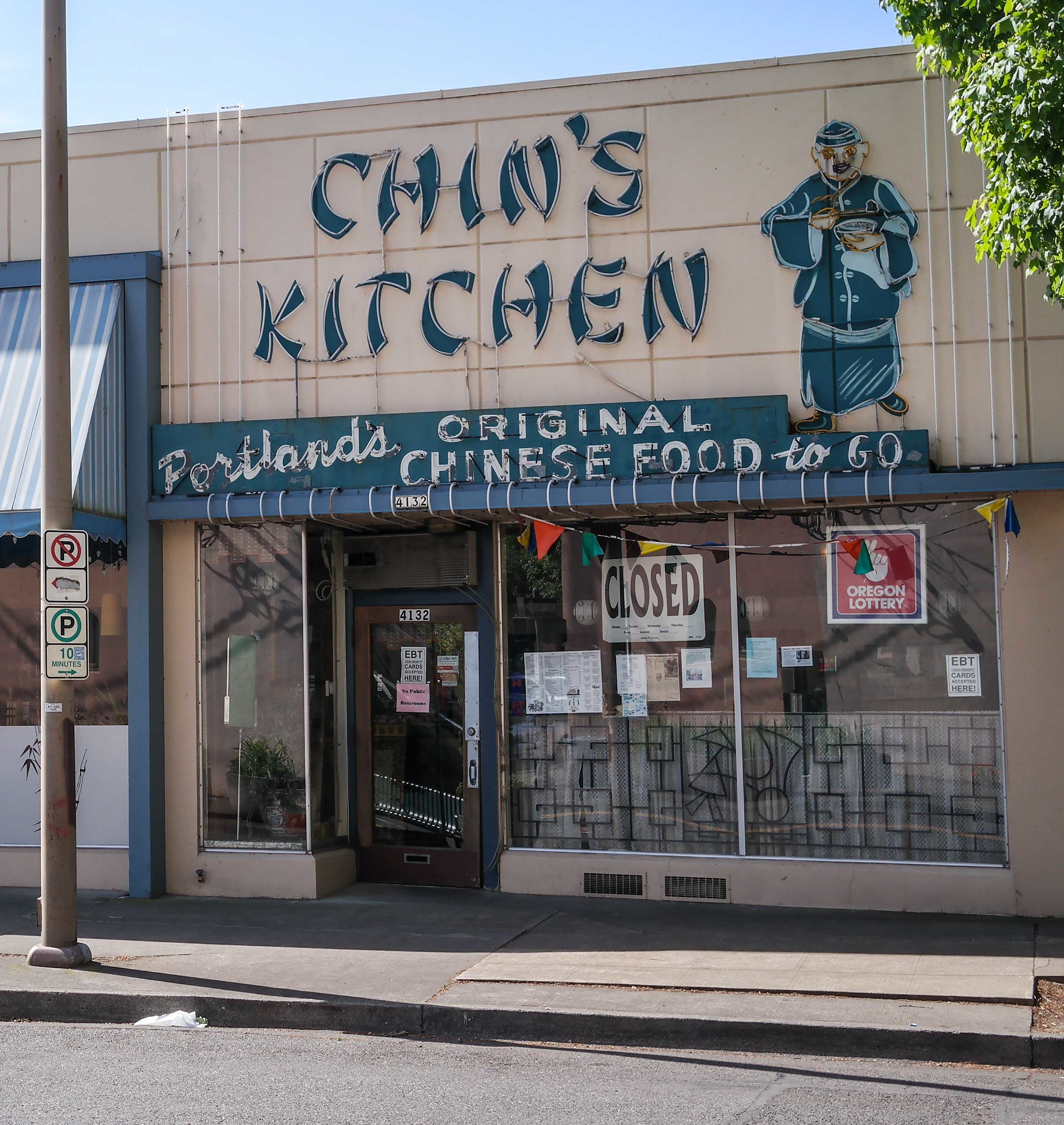
- The restaurant's exterior in 2014
- Interactive map of Chin's Kitchen

Restaurant information
- Established: 1949
- Food type: Chinese
- Location: 4126 Northeast Broadway Street, Portland, Multnomah, Oregon, 97232, United States
- Coordinates: 45.5350°N 122.6206°W
- Website: chinskitchenpdx.com

Chin's Kitchen is a Chinese restaurant in Portland, Oregon, United States.

== Description ==
The Chinese restaurant Chin's Kitchen is located in northeast Portland's Hollywood neighborhood. A neon sign is displayed on the exterior.

== History ==
Chin's Kitchen opened in 1949.

Sisters Chang Feng "Wendy" and Change "Cindy" Li purchased the restaurant in 2017. In November, the restaurant closed temporarily for a kitchen renovation and other upgrades.

Chin's closed briefly during the COVID-19 pandemic.

The restaurant has been featured on the Food Network series Diners, Drive-Ins and Dives. It participated in Portland's Dumpling Week in 2026.

== Reception ==
In Eater Portland's 2021 overview of "Where to Find Outstanding Chinese Takeout in Portland and Beyond", Seiji Nanbu and Brooke Jackson-Glidden recommended the la pi (vegetable salt with noodles), dumplings, and the Chinese sauerkraut and pork. The website's Nathan Williams included the restaurant in a 2022 list of "14 Standout Spots in Portland’s Eclectic Hollywood District".

== See also ==
- List of Chinese restaurants
- List of Diners, Drive-Ins and Dives episodes
