= Berrydale Park =

Public park in Portland, Oregon, U.S.

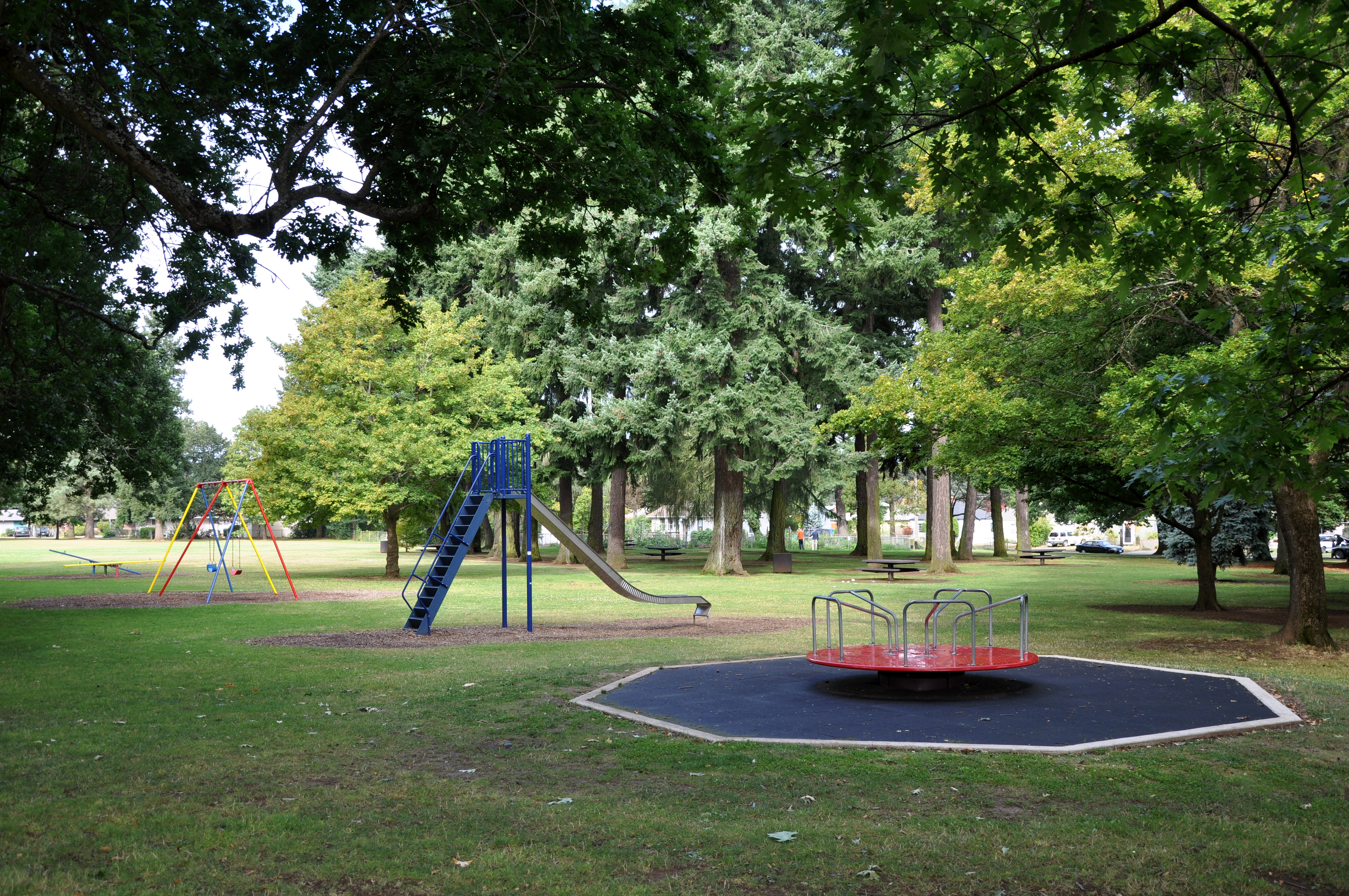
- The park in 2010
- Interactive map of Berrydale Park
- Location: SE 92nd Ave. and Taylor St. Portland, Oregon
- Coordinates: 45°30′53″N 122°34′14″W
- Area: 6.31 acres (2.55 ha)
- Operator: Portland Parks & Recreation

Berrydale Park is a 6.31-acre (2.55 ha) public park in the Montavilla neighborhood, in southeast Portland, Oregon, United States. The park was acquired in 1956.
