= Chinese Festival (Portland, Oregon) =

Annual event in the United States

- Frequency: Annually
- Location: Portland, Oregon
- Country: United States
- Inaugurated: 2019
- Organiser: Oregon Chinese Coalition

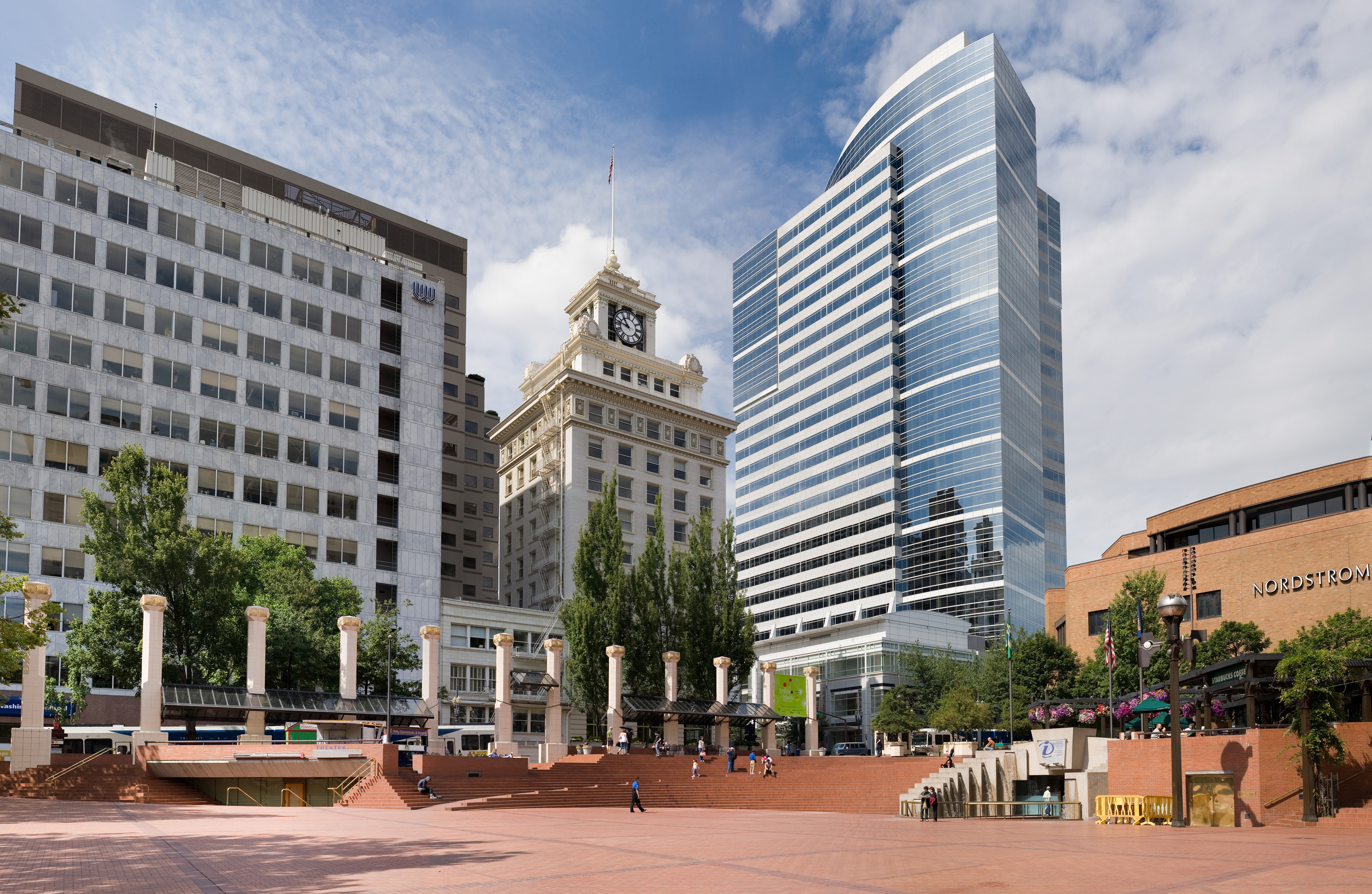
The festival is held at Pioneer Courthouse Square (pictured in 2007)

The Chinese Festival, also known as the Oregon Chinese Festival, is an annual event in Portland, Oregon, United States. Organized by the Oregon Chinese Coalition, the event is held at Pioneer Courthouse Square each August and features art, food, dancing, and music. It was established in 2019 to celebrate Chinese culture and traditions. The 2020 event was canceled because of the COVID-19 pandemic. Hundreds of people attended the 2026 event, which had approximately 40 acts.

== See also ==
- Culture of Portland, Oregon
- History of Chinese Americans in Portland, Oregon
- List of festivals in the United States
