= Powellhurst-Gilbert, Portland, Oregon =

Powellhurst-Gilbert
- Neighborhood
- Location in Portland
- Coordinates: 45°29′48″N 122°32′43″W
- Country: United States
- State: Oregon
- City: Portland

Government
  - Association: Powellhurst-Gilbert Neighborhood Association
  - Coalition: East Portland Neighborhood Office

Area
  - Total: 3.44 sq mi (8.90 km^{2})

Population (2020)
  - Total: 32,852
  - Density: 9,560/sq mi (3,690/km^{2})

Housing
  - No. of households: 10,137
  - Occupancy rate: 93% occupied
  - Owner-occupied: 3637 households (58%)
  - Renting: 2661 households (42%)
  - Avg. household size: 2.95 persons

Powellhurst-Gilbert is a neighborhood in the Southeast section of Portland, Oregon. It borders the neighborhoods of Montavilla, Hazelwood, and Mill Park on the north, Centennial on the east, Pleasant Valley on the east and south, and Lents and South Tabor on the west.

According to the Neighborhood Plan, the neighborhood is named after two of its schools: Powellhurst (named in the 1920s after 1850s settler Jackson Powell) and Gilbert (named after William M. Gilbert, an Indiana emigrant who settled in the area c. 1890). Settlement of the community by farmers via the Donation Land Claim Act began in the middle of the 19th century. Rail service to Portland began in 1892, spurring residential development. The resulting suburb was gradually annexed by Portland beginning in the 1960s and completing in 1994.

The neighborhood includes the Jade District commercial and cultural center.

Powellhurst-Gilbert contains Portland's largest Asian population, making up 17.89% of the city's population.

With a population of 32,852, it is Portland's most populous neighborhood.

== See also ==
- Heart Beacon (2013)
- Kelly Butte Natural Area
