= HK Cafe =

Chinese restaurant in Portland, Oregon, U.S.

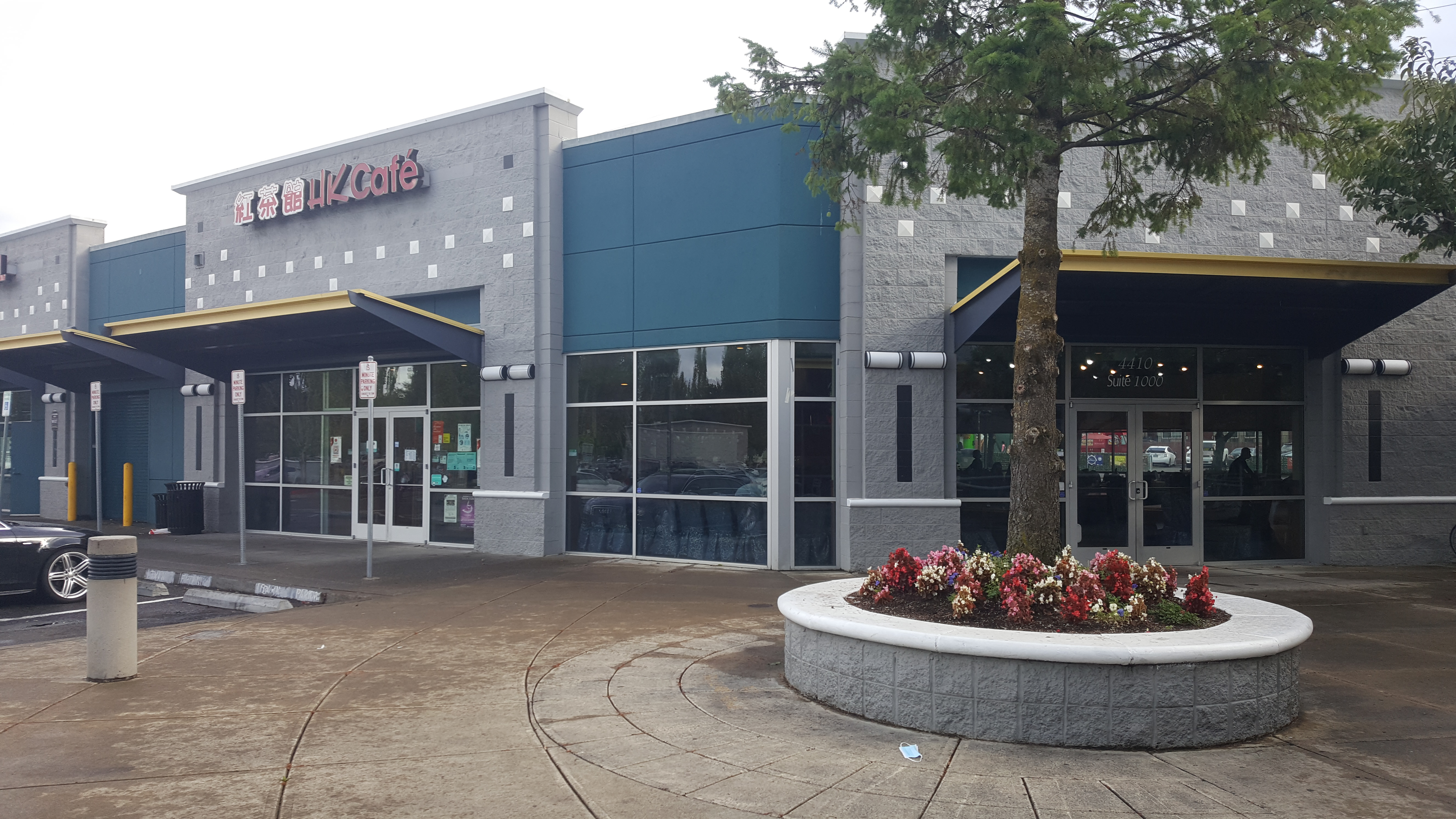
- The restaurant's exterior in 2021
- Interactive map of HK Cafe

Restaurant information
- Food type: Chinese
- Location: Portland, Multnomah, Oregon, United States
- Coordinates: 45.4905°N 122.5781°W
- Website: hkcafetogo.com

HK Cafe is a Chinese restaurant in Portland, Oregon, United States. It operates in southeast Portland's Lents neighborhood.

== Description ==
HK Cafe is located in southeast Portland's Lents neighborhood. Ainslee Dicken of Portland Monthly has described HK Cafe as a "sprawling, gaudily decorated restaurant offering an abundance of small dishes". Ben Waterhouse of The Oregonian said of the interior: "You won't find any fancy chandeliers or shark-fin displays here. HK Cafe's crowded dining room is brightly lit but spare, decorated with hanging paper lanterns and parasols."

The restaurant specializes in dim sum; specific menu items include bok choy, cha siu bao (barbecue pork buns), custard buns, har gow, noodles, radish cake, and shumai. The menu also includes beef short ribs in broth, salad with pig-ear, roast pork, deep-fried rice balls with sweet pork, and "Chinese sushi" (fish and shrimp wrapped in seaweed, breaded and fried).

== History ==
The restaurant operated via take-out during the COVID-19 pandemic.

== Reception ==
In 2013, Ben Waterhouse of The Oregonian said, "HK Cafe proves that even the bleakest of asphalt deserts can be home to great food." In 2020, Michael Russell included the restaurant in the newspaper's list of Portland's 40 best inexpensive restaurants and described HK Cafe as one of the city's busiest restaurants on weekends. Seiji Nanbu and Brooke Jackson-Glidden included HK Cafe in Eater Portland's 2021 overview of recommended restaurants for "outstanding" Chinese take-out in the Portland metropolitan area. Katherine Chew Hamilton and Jackson-Glidden included HK Cafe in the website's 2025 list of the city's best restaurants and food cart pods for large groups. Portland Monthly included the dim sum in a 2022 list of the city's twelve best breakfasts. The business was a runner-up in the Best Chinese Restaurant category of Willamette Week's annual 'Best of Portland' readers' poll in 2016, 2017, 2018, and 2022.

== See also ==
- List of Chinese restaurants
