= Eastport Plaza =

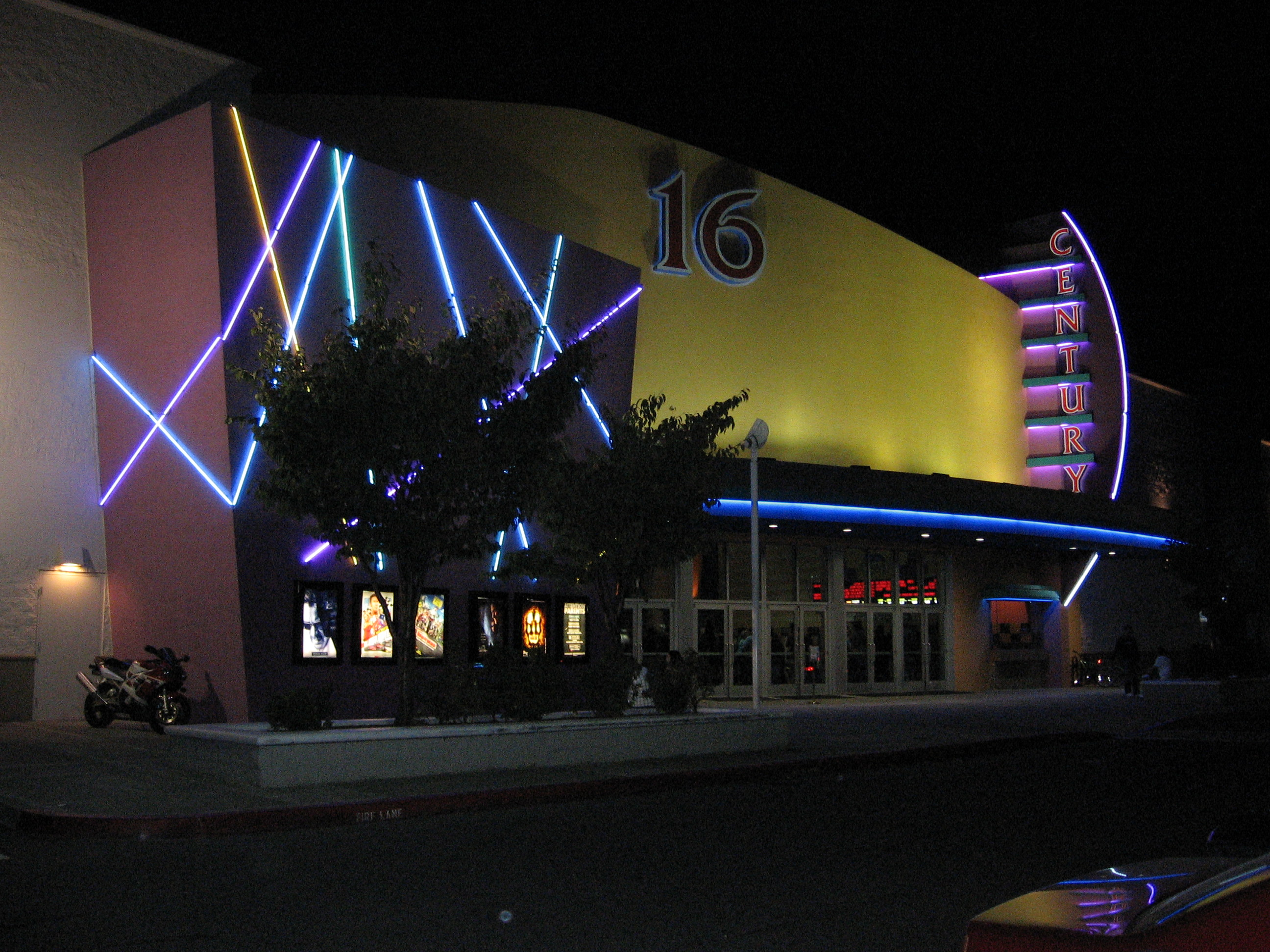
- Exterior of Century 16 Theatres at Eastport Plaza at night, 2007
- Location: Portland, Oregon, United States
- Coordinates: 45.4918°N 122.5763°W
- Address: 4000 SE 82nd Avenue
- Opened: Sep 1960 (original indoor mall), 1996 (current open-air shopping plaza)
- Closed: 1996 (original indoor mall)
- Developer: E. Phillip Lyon; Edward Meltzer
- Owner: Eastport Plaza. L.P.
- Num. of stores: 45
- Num. of anchor tenants: 5
- Floor area: sqft
- Website: eastportplaza.com

Eastport Plaza is a shopping center located in Portland, Oregon, in the United States. It is anchored by Century 16 Theatres and LA Fitness. Originally an enclosed shopping mall, construction began on October 20, 1959, and was carried out by the Anderson–Westfall Construction Company. It was one of the biggest construction projects in the Pacific Northwest at the time and cost $5 million. It opened on October 27, 1960.

Former anchor stores included J. C. Penney, Mervyn's (which replaced Lipman's), Newberry's, Albertsons, Tower Records, Walmart and G.I. Joe's. It largely became a dead mall in the 1990s, particularly after Mervyn's relocated to Clackamas Promenade in 1988, part of a flight of businesses and customers to the newer, larger suburban mall to Eastport's south on 82nd Avenue. The enclosed structure was demolished in 1996, replaced by the current open-air shopping plaza.

Eastport Plaza was sold to the Hong Phat group in December 2024.
