= Jacqueline M. Newman =

Professor emeritus at Queens College-CUNY

- Born: Jacqueline M. Newman; 1932
- Education: New York University
- Occupation: Professor
- Employer: Queens College-CUNY
- Known for: Chinese cuisine, food culture
- Awards: 2009 Amelia Award, 2010 Most Influential

Jacqueline M. Newman is a professor emerita at Queens College-CUNY, specializing in Chinese cuisine, history, gastronomy, and food culture. Considered a trailblazer in the field, Newman has authored numerous books on the subject of Chinese cuisine and is the editor-in-chief of the Flavor and Fortune, a periodical focusing on the science and art of Chinese cuisine. She has also served on the awards committee of James Beard Foundation and on Board of Directors of the Food Exhibition Museum in Suzhou, China.

== Academics ==
Newman originally earned degrees for elementary school teaching from kindergarten to grade 8, however her academic career began by teaching Chinese cooking in the Home-Economics Department at Queens College-CUNY. This involvement in Chinese cuisines in the department led her to continue earn her Masters and Doctorate in home economics.

The subject of her doctoral thesis originated with a discussion with New York University Professor Ruth Linke, and involved comparing the dietary habits of culturally Chinese people in China and versus the United States. Since then, Chinese and Asian cuisines and food habits has been the focus of her academic research.

In 2002, Newman gifted to Stony Brook University a historically significant collection of over 4000 pieces of audio and visual material on Chinese food culture, medicine, and history and Chinese cookbooks. Known as the Jacqueline M. Newman Chinese Cookbook Collection, it "...provides a valuable record of the Chinese Diaspora that has carried its rich cuisine to every corner of the globe." In 2013, Newman is looking to hand over her position as the editor-in-chef for Flavor and Fortune.

Newman is also the single largest contributor and donor to the Harley Spiller Menus Collection at the University of Toronto, Scarborough, which is the world's largest collection of Chinese restaurant menus.

== Contributions ==
Her books include:

- Chinese Cookbooks: An Annotated English-Language Compendium (1987)
- Cooking from China's Fujian Province and Food Culture in China (2004).

She also contributed a text on Chinese cuisine to The Oxford Encyclopedia of Food and Drink in America.

== Awards ==
For her key role in the Western study of Chinese cuisine, Jacqueline M. Newman has garnered several accolades:

- 2009 Amelia Award
- 2010 Most Influential Personalities in American Chinese Restaurant Industry
