= Montavilla, Portland, Oregon =

Montavilla
- Neighborhood
- Photo of the Montavilla Plaza at SE 79th Ave. and SE Stark St.
- Location in Portland
- Coordinates: 45°31′35″N 122°34′45″W
- Country: United States
- State: Oregon
- City: Portland

Government
  - Association: Montavilla Neighborhood Association
  - Coalition: Southeast Uplift

Area
  - Total: 2.18 sq mi (5.64 km^{2})

Population (2020)
  - Total: 16,942
  - Density: 7,780/sq mi (3,000/km^{2})

Housing
  - No. of households: 6,959
  - Occupancy rate: 95%
  - Owner-occupied: 62%
  - Renting: 38%
  - Avg. household size: 2.4 persons
- Approx. race: White 68%, Asian 13%, Black 7%, Other 12% Approx. Hispanic or Latino (any race) 11%

Montavilla (a shortening of Mt. Tabor Villa) is a neighborhood in the Northeast and Southeast sections of Portland, Oregon, United States, and contains an area east of Mount Tabor, a cinder cone and city park, and west of Interstate 205, from the Banfield Freeway (Interstate 84) on the north to SE Division Street on the south. It is bordered by the North Tabor, Mount Tabor, South Tabor, Madison South, Hazelwood, and Powellhurst-Gilbert neighborhoods. Montavilla's population was about 17,000 in 2020.

== History ==
"Montavilla" is a contraction of "Mount Tabor Villa", a Portland addition platted on June 11, 1889. According to Oregon Geographic Names, the addition's name was ". . . cumbersome, and the place was immediately known as Montavilla and has been ever since." Historian Patricia Sanders, writing for The Montavilla News, says that "The first documented usage of the name Montavilla occurs in a U.S. Post Office ledger that records the appointment of James Downing (1836–1927) on September 23, 1891, as Montavilla’s first postmaster."

The Montavilla post office was established on September 21, 1891. It became a station of the Portland post office.

Electric streetcar service reached Montavilla in 1892. Streetcar service to Montavilla ended in 1948.

A stone milepost marker, the P5 marker, on SE Stark Street at SE 78th Avenue is left over from the circa 1854 Base Line Road that extended from the Willamette River to the Sandy River. The milepost marks a distance of 5 miles (8 km) from the downtown courthouse. It is among the markers that indicate the Willamette baseline.

In the early-mid 1950s, the Asbahr Addition was developed between SE 89th and SE 92nd Avenues to the west and east, and SE Taylor and SE Harrison Streets to the north and south. It is primarily made of ranch-style houses.

Chinese Village, a neighborhood landmark from 1946 through July 2018, was along 82nd Avenue between SE Washington and Stark Streets.

The Monastery of the Precious Blood, a 1923 building on the National Register of Historic Places, is at 1208 SE 76th Avenue. The Register lists the Mission/Spanish Revival structure for its architectural as well as religious significance.

A 1934 redlining map of Portland assigned the areas within current Montavilla boundaries with a yellow grade, or "Definitely Declining." Regarding the C30 tract surrounding the Stark Street business district, mapmakers reported, "The area is not highly regarded and considerable sales resistance is reported," while also noting "subversive races a threat." In 1947, a racist covenant placed restrictions on the Park Terrace Homes development (along NE Pacific Street between 82nd and 87th Avenues), declaring, "No race or nationality other than those of the Caucasian or White race shall occupy any dwelling on any lot except this Covenant shall not prevent occupancy by domestic servants of a different race or nationality employed by an owner or tenant.”

== Community ==
- Founded in 2010, the Montavilla Food Co-op is working to bring a cooperative grocery to the neighborhood, though it does not have a storefront.
- Montavilla is home to the community organization Pollinator Parkways, which converts parking strips to wildlife habitat.
- The Montavilla/East Tabor Business Association (METBA) hosts the Montavilla Street Fair each summer. Established in 2011, the fair offers food, art, music, and other wares and entertainments along Stark Street between 76th and 82nd Avenues. Held on a Sunday each year, it overlaps that day with the Montavilla Farmers Market.
- The Montavilla Emergency Warming Shelter and Rahab's Sisters both operate from St. Peter and Paul Episcopal Church, located along SE 82nd Avenue.
- The neighborhood was served by the local Mid-County Memo newspaper until 2019.
- The Montavilla Farmers Market operates at 76th Avenue and Stark Street. It is open from 10 a.m. to 2 p.m. every Sunday from May through December 20, and from January through April, it is open at those hours on alternate Sundays.
- The southern portion of the neighborhood includes the northern part of the Jade District commercial and cultural center. The district, a 10-block area centered on the intersection of SE Division St. and SE 82nd Avenue, is a neighborhood improvement program managed by the Asian Pacific Network of Oregon (APANO).

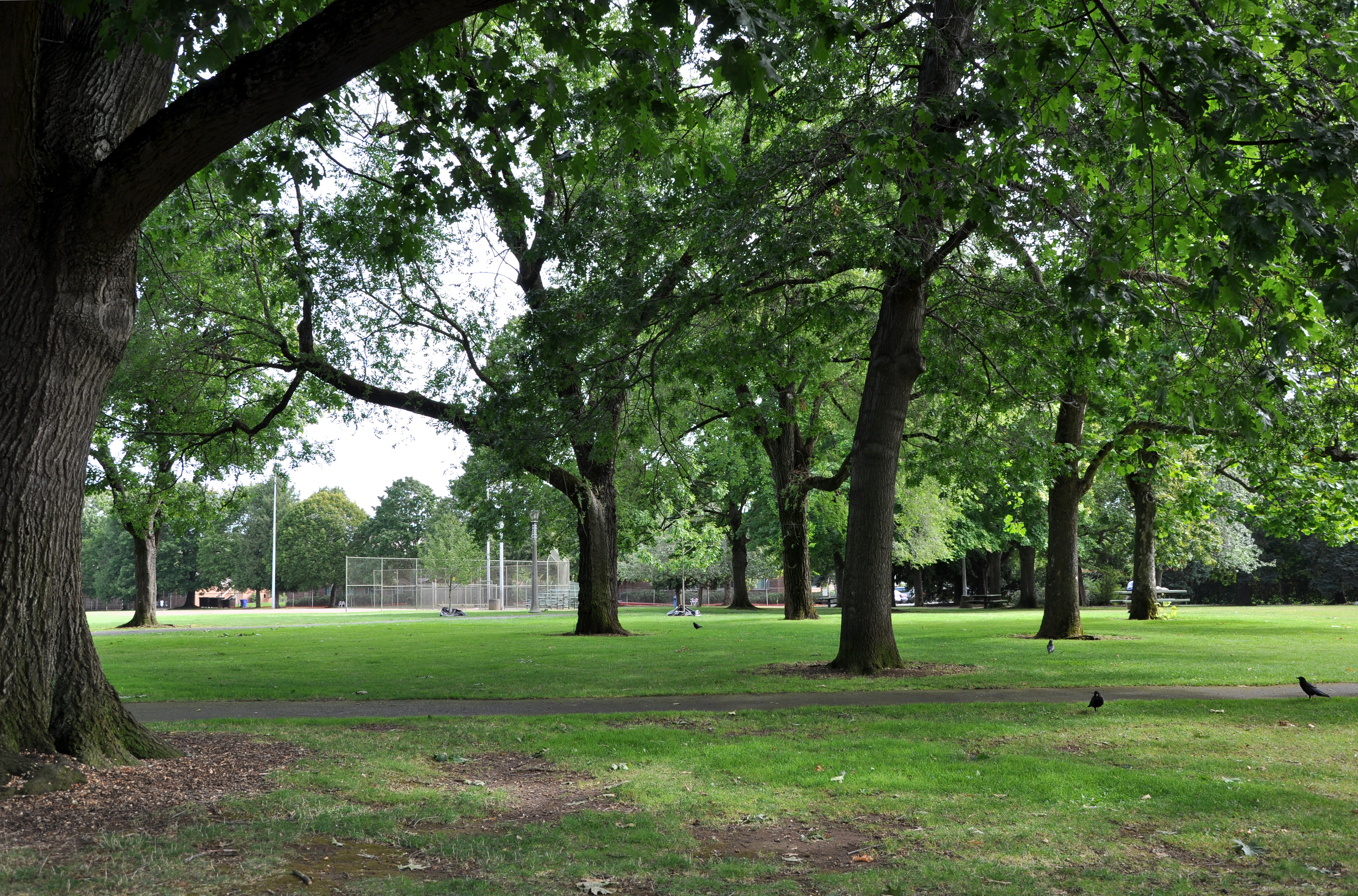
Montavilla Park

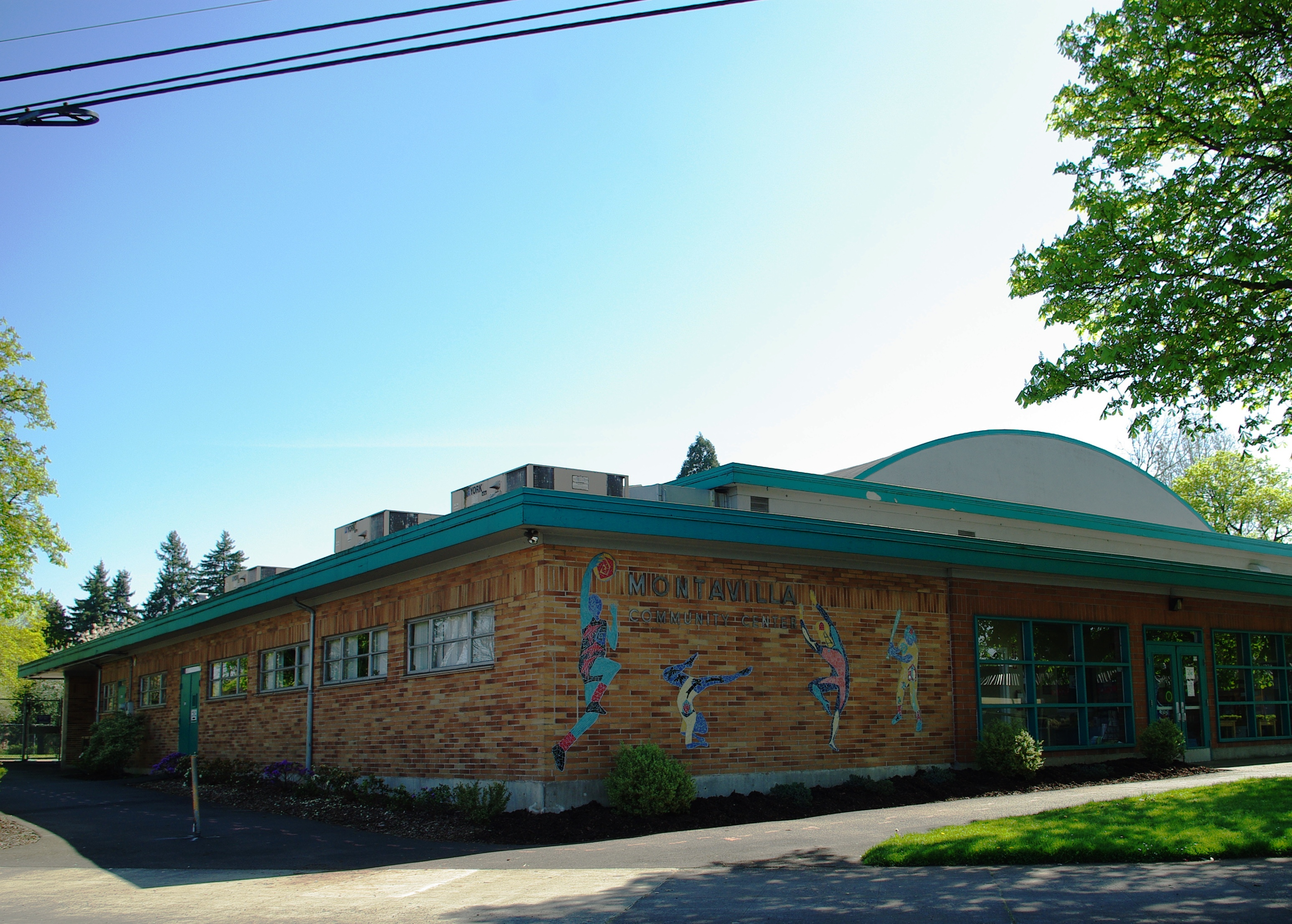
Montavilla Community Center

=== Parks ===
Montavilla Park, 9.46-acre (3.83 ha) at the intersection of Glisan Street and NE 82nd Avenue, was established in 1921. The Montavilla Community Center, including the Montavilla Outdoor Pool, are parts of the park as is a futsal field sponsored by the Portland Timbers. Other amenities include picnic areas, a playground, a restroom, and fields for soccer and softball.

Harrison Park, 4.63 acres (1.87 ha) at SE 84th Avenue and Harrison Street, was established in 1946. Adjacent to Harrison Park Middle School, it has a playground as well as fields for soccer and softball.

Berrydale Park, a 6.31-acre (2.55 ha) park established in 1956 at SE 92nd Avenue and Taylor Street, is adjacent to Clark Elementary School in Montavilla. Amenities include a playground, picnic table, fields for soccer and softball, and a skatepark for skateboarding.

In event of a major earthquake, such as a Cascadia Subduction Zone earthquake, Montavilla Park and Harrison Park will each serve as a Basic Earthquake Emergency Communication Nodes Site, one of the city's official locations for seeking emergency assistance if phone service is down or for reporting severe damage or injury during such an emergency.

=== Gardens ===
Vestal Community Garden, 0.39 acres (0.16 ha) at NE 81st Avenue and Everett Street, has been part of the community since 2010. Berrydale Community Garden at 9004 SE Taylor Street, 0.54 acres (0.22 ha), opened in 1976.

=== Schools ===
Vestal K-5, a school for social justice, is near the center of the neighborhood, immediately west of 82nd Avenue between E Burnside Street and NE Glisan Street. Clark Elementary K-5 School is at 1231 SE 92nd Avenue. Harrison Park Middle School, grades 6-8, is near the southern end of the neighborhood at 2225 SE 87th Avenue. Columbia Christian School, pre-kindergarten through grade 12, is a private Christian school on a 13-acre (5.3 ha) campus east of 90th Avenue between East Burnside Street and NE Glisan Street. The school opened in 1947. Enrollment was about 300 in 2025–2026.

The former Multnomah University, later the Multnomah Campus of Jessup University, operates a campus at 8435 NE Glisan Street, adjacent to Montavilla Park. In 2023, the Christian school, which had enrolled students at this location for about 90 years, merged with California-based Jessup. In 2025, the Multnomah Campus, faced with financial difficulties, ceased offering traditional undergraduate classes, student housing, and student athletics and made some of its buildings and sports fields available for community projects. Volunteers of America (VOA) uses two campus dormitories for a residential treatment program, and Inter PDX, a youth sports group, uses the school's soccer field. Roger's Cafe, a coffee shop on campus, is open to the public. Jessup University put the 20-acre (8.1 ha) campus up for sale in mid-2025. The listing includes 16 buildings but excludes the two buildings along NE Pacific Street used by the VOA.

Portland Community College enrolls about 12,000 students a year at its 18-acre (7.3 ha) Southeast Campus along the southern boundary of the neighborhood at 82nd Avenue and Division Street. The campus opened in 1981 and expanded in size and scope in 2008 after passage of a voter-approved bond measure. Students can choose from a wide variety of courses in the arts and sciences, business, healthcare, education, construction, and other fields to pursue certificates, associate degrees, non-credit training, or university transfer credits. Adjacent to the campus along Division Street is Legin Commons, a four-story apartment building with 124 units of affordable housing, on land made available by the college.

=== Cemetery ===
Brainard Cemetery, a 1.1-acre (0.45 ha) plot at the corner of Glisan Street and 90th Avenue, is one of the historic cemeteries maintained by Metro (Oregon regional government). William Brainard and his wife Elizabeth donated a small section of their farm for a cemetery in 1884, after the plot had been used for burials as early as the 1870s. Multnomah County acquired the cemetery in 1953.

=== Stark Street ===
As a neighborhood center, SE Stark Street between 75th and 82nd Avenues provides a mix of commercial and retail services. It is a place where people can socialize, run their errands, window shop, and dine at local restaurants. At the center of the area is the Academy Theater, built in 1948 and restored in 2006

=== Glisan Street ===
While Glisan Street is more vehicle-oriented than Stark Street, the area west of 82nd Avenue has a number of pedestrian-friendly small business, including a number of eateries. The street also contains dispensaries, medical offices, gift stores, salons, auto shops, and religious institutions.

== Transportation ==
Three roads bounding Montavilla—Division, I-84, and I-205—are major transportation arteries, giving the neighborhood easy automobile access to the city center and outlying areas. Within Montavilla, Glisan, Burnside, and Stark Streets run east–west and 82nd Avenue runs north–south; all are major transportation streets served by TriMet bus lines. The Max serves one stop in Montavilla, at 82nd Avenue, and another at the Gateway Transit Center, just outside the boundary.

The neighborhood is home to the 70s Neighborhood Greenway, which connects SE Flavel Street and NE Sacramento Street around the 70s' numbered avenues. Passing through Montavilla and other neighborhoods, it aims to fill a gap in the north-south bicycle and pedestrian routes near 82nd Avenue.

=== 82nd Avenue ===
The thoroughfare 82nd Avenue (a formerly state-managed highway OR 213), bisects the neighborhood from north to south. It is a highly commercial street that is directly surrounded by dense neighborhoods of primarily single-family homes. Because 82nd Avenue runs through the neighborhood, residents often cross this five-lane road for school, work, or recreation. The intersection of 82nd and Glisan Street is among the city's identified high-crash intersections, and it is ranked by the City of Portland as the most dangerous intersection within Portland for pedestrians, however no public plans have been announced to improve this intersection. The intersections with SE Division and E Burnside are also identified as high-crash intersections. In an attempt to improve the quality of life around 82nd Avenue, the 82nd Avenue Improvement Coalition was formed; among its main goals is the transfer of ownership of 82nd Avenue to City of Portland control, instead of state control. In the spring of 2022, the Portland City Council approved the Portland Bureau of Transportation (PBOT) taking ownership of 82nd Avenue from the Oregon Department of Transportation (ODOT).
