= Jade District =

Commercial area in Portland, Oregon, U.S.

- Commercial area of Portland
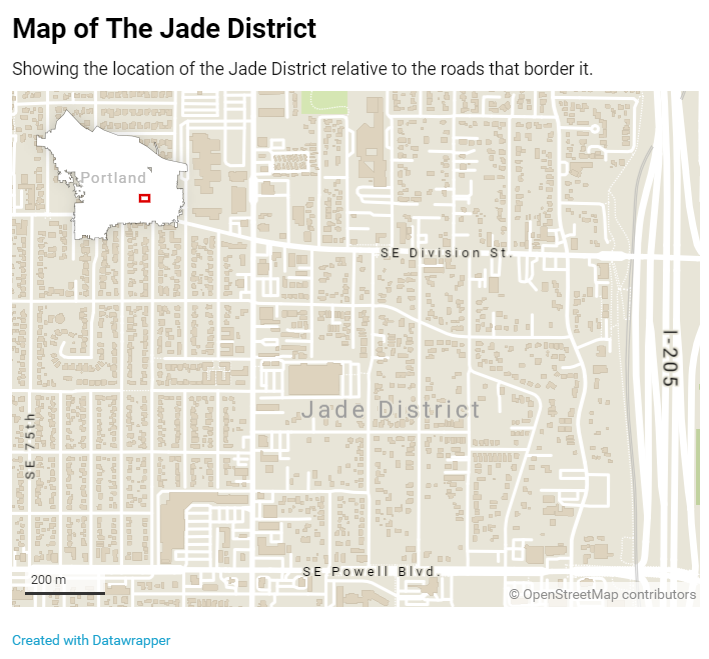
- Shows the location of the Jade District relative to the streets bordering it.
- Interactive map of Jade District
- Coordinates: 45.501556°N 122.578480°W
- Country: United States
- State: Oregon
- County: Multnomah
- City: Portland
- Sextant: Southeast
- Neighborhood: Powellhurst-Gilbert

The Jade District is an Asian-dominated commercial area and cultural hub radiating outward from Southeast 82nd Avenue and Division Street, in Portland, Oregon, in the United States. It is roughly between Division Street and Powell Boulevard to the north and south, and between SE 75th Avenue and I-205 to the east and west. Part of the Montavilla, Powellhurst-Gilbert, and South Tabor neighborhoods, the district is one of the most diverse census tracts in the state of Oregon.

The Jade District was recognized as a Neighborhood Prosperity Initiative in 2013. It is at risk of rapid gentrification. The Jade International Night Market, an annual event held on the last two Saturdays in August, "provides a space to celebrate and recognize the diversity and culture of the communities who live and work in the Jade District and sheds light on the issues impacting a neighborhood in transition."

At the corner of 82nd Avenue and Division Street, the site of a former furniture store, Metro is constructing a community center and affordable housing building in partnership with Asian Pacific American Network of Oregon (APANO) and nonprofit developer ROSE Community Development. Prior to demolition of the furniture store, the building had been home to the Jade/APANO Multicultural Space.

Improvements are being made to the area as part of the Jade and Montavilla Connected Centers project, including street, sidewalk, and lighting improvements.

== See also ==
- Culture of Portland, Oregon
