= South Tabor, Portland, Oregon =

South Tabor Neighborhood
- Neighborhood
- Location in Portland
- Coordinates: 45°30′05″N 122°35′41″W
- Country: United States
- State: Oregon
- City: Portland

Government
  - Association: South Tabor Neighborhood Association
  - Coalition: Southeast Uplift

Area
  - Total: 0.80 sq mi (2.07 km^{2})

Population (2000)
  - Total: 6,131
  - Density: 7,670/sq mi (2,960/km^{2})

Housing
  - No. of households: 2,540
  - Occupancy rate: 96% occupied
  - Owner-occupied: 1153 households (61%)
  - Renting: 987 households (39%)
  - Avg. household size: 2.41 persons
- Website: southtabor.org

South Tabor is a neighborhood in southeastern Portland, Oregon in the United States. The neighborhood is bounded by SE Division, Powell, 52nd, and 82nd Avenues. Its neighborhood association is a member of the Southeast Uplift coalition, which serves as its link to Portland's Office of Neighborhood Involvement.

South Tabor is named for its proximity to Mount Tabor, an extinct volcano and one of Portland's more popular parks.

South Tabor is largely residential; all of the neighborhood's businesses are situated on the streets that form its boundaries.

Two of Portland's three most dangerous intersections are at the easternmost corners of the neighborhood: SE Powell and 82nd, and SE Division and 82nd.

Franklin High School, Atkinson Elementary, Kellogg Middle School, St. Mark's Lutheran Church, and Trinity Fellowship Church are in South Tabor.

The eastern portion of the neighborhood includes the Jade District commercial and cultural center.
