= 82nd Avenue =

Street in Portland, Oregon

82nd Avenue (Avenue of the Roses)
- Avenue of the Roses (since 1997)
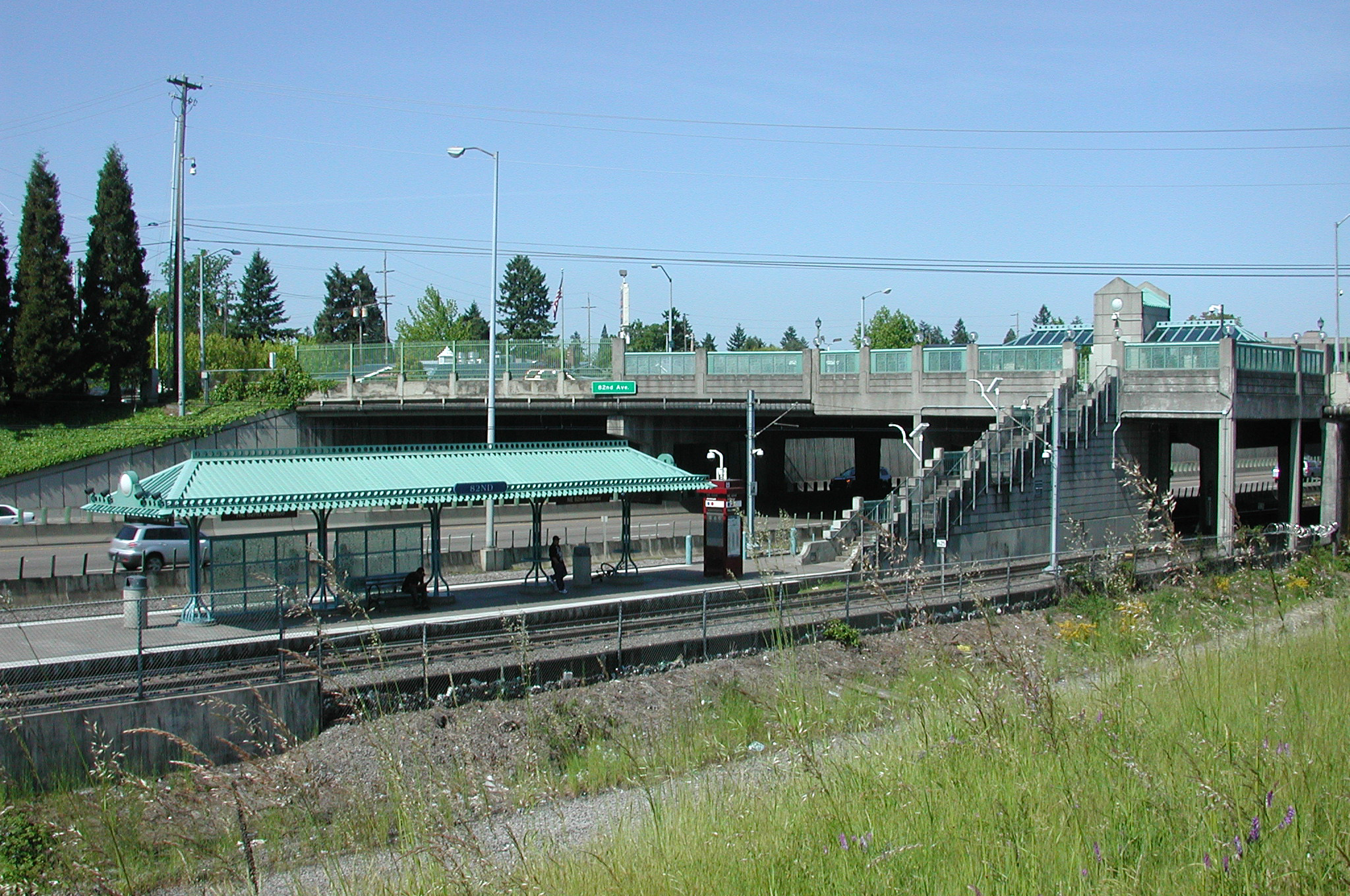
- A light rail station on I-84 at 82nd Avenue
- Location: Portland, Oregon
- North end: Airport Way Frontage Rd
- South end: Interstate 205

82nd Avenue (officially 82nd Avenue of the Roses since 2005) is a street in Portland, Oregon, and comprises the northern end of Oregon Route 213, also known as the Cascade Highway. It is one of the longest streets in Portland, running down the entire east side of the city, and extending into suburbs to the south.

== Route ==
The street runs from Airport Way Frontage Rd in Northeast Portland, south through Clackamas and Happy Valley, to Interstate 205 in Gladstone. Oregon 213 continues south beyond I-205. Within the city of Portland, it runs through the neighborhoods of Montavilla and Madison South, and it serves as a boundary line for the neighborhoods of Roseway, Cully, Sumner, South Tabor, Foster-Powell, Mt. Scott-Arleta, Brentwood-Darlington, and Lents. It is a highly commercial street that, in many of these neighborhoods, is directly surrounded by dense neighborhoods of primarily single-family homes.

== Public transit ==
The MAX Light Rail serves 82nd Avenue directly at the Interstate 84 overpass, where the NE 82nd Ave MAX Station offers access to MAX's Blue, Green, and Red lines. The Green Line then parallels 82nd Avenue going south along I-205 to Clackamas Town Center Transit Center. The Red Line roughly parallels the northern portion of 82nd Avenue.

== Jurisdiction ==
The entire length of 82nd Avenue is signed as Oregon Route 213. Because it is a state highway, 82nd Avenue was under the jurisdiction of the Oregon Department of Transportation. The agency views the street's top priorities as moving high volumes of automobile traffic efficiently, serving freight traffic, and serving as an alternative route when I-205 has problems. There was interest in transferring jurisdiction from the state to the City of Portland, in a transfer similar to what has already happened with North Martin Luther King Jr. Boulevard and Sandy Boulevard. In an attempt to improve the quality of life around 82nd Avenue, the 82nd Avenue Improvement Coalition was formed; among its main goals is the transfer of ownership of 82nd Avenue to City of Portland control, instead of state control. In November 2021, the Oregon Transportation Commission agreed to transfer ownership of 82nd Avenue from the state to the city of Portland. The commission unanimously approved a series of safety and modernization projects along 82nd Avenue that would cost $185 million and be funded by the state, the American Rescue Plan Act, and the Portland Bureau of Transportation.

== Safety issues ==
As of 2014, five of the intersections along 82nd ranked among the most dangerous 5% of Oregon intersections, with six of its intersections identified as high-crash by the City of Portland. The Oregon Department of Transportation planned to spend $5 million on safety improvements. Nearby residents often cross this five-lane road for school, work, or recreation—there are a variety of schools, parks, and community centers that are sited along 82nd Avenue, such as Vestal Elementary, Portland Community College, and Montavilla Community Center. The intersection of 82nd and Glisan Street is among the city's identified high-crash intersections, and it is ranked by the City of Portland as the most dangerous intersection within Portland for pedestrians, however no public plans have been announced to improve this intersection.

== See also ==
- 82nd Avenue of Roses Parade
- List of streets in Portland, Oregon
