= Chinese restaurant =

Establishment that serves Chinese cuisine

The interior of a Chinese restaurant in Sha Tin, Hong Kong

A Chinese restaurant is a restaurant that serves Chinese cuisine. Most of them are in the Cantonese style, due to the history of the Chinese diaspora, though other regional cuisines, such as Sichuan cuisine and Hakka cuisine, are also common. Many Chinese restaurants may adapt their cuisine to fit local taste preferences, as in British Chinese cuisine and American Chinese cuisine. Some Chinese restaurants may also serve other Asian cuisines in their menus, such as Japanese, Korean, Indonesian, or Thai cuisines, though their selection is often limited and minimal compared to Chinese dishes.

Chinese takeouts (North America) or Chinese takeaways (United Kingdom and Commonwealth) are terms used to describe Chinese restaurants specifically designed for take-out, as opposed to traditional eat-in restaurants which typically offer take-out as an option; such take-out restaurants are often simplistic and lack tables or seats.

== By country ==
=== Australia ===
At the beginning of the 21st century, Chinese restaurants had been present in a significant majority of Australian cities and towns for over fifty years, and in many places for over one hundred and fifty years.

They emerged as commercial enterprises on the Victorian gold fields.

The significant majority of original Chinese migration came from Guangdong Province in southern China, heavily influencing the style of food, consisting of fresh vegetables and fruit, with fish, poultry, and pork, with rice, herbs and spices.

One third of all cooks in Australia were Chinese by 1890.

=== Canada ===
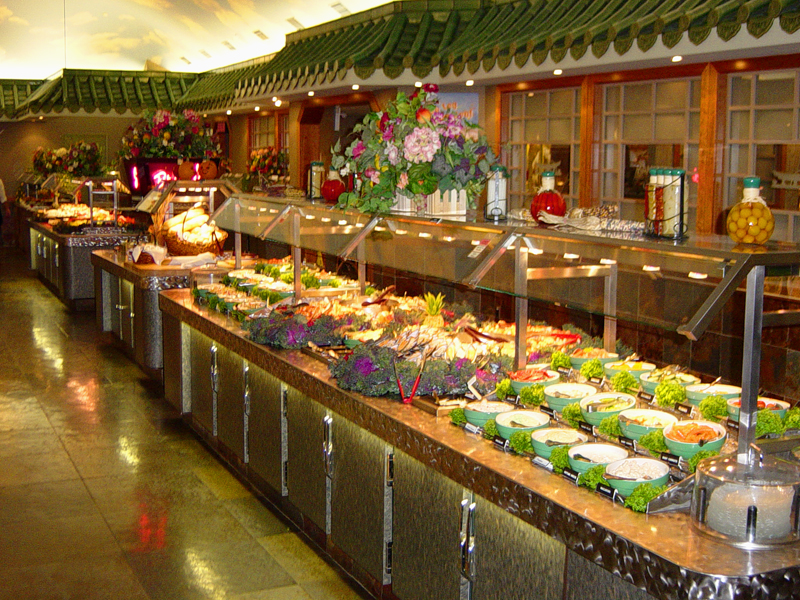
Buffet-style servings at a Mandarin all-you-can-eat Chinese restaurant in Ontario

The first Chinese restaurants in Canada were established in Western Canada and the Canadian Prairies by Chinese labourers working on the Canadian Pacific Railway in the 19th century. Due to common anti-Chinese sentiment at the time, many Chinese immigrants were unable to work in businesses that were not restaurants or laundromats, leading to the common establishment of the former. The number of Chinese restaurants in Canada grew due to increased immigration to Canada in the mid-20th century following the repeal of the Chinese Immigration Act, 1885.

Many towns and cities across Canada have Chinese restaurants, most prominently in areas with large concentrations of Asian Canadians, such as Markham, Ontario.

=== Egypt ===
The majority of Egypt's Chinese restaurants are found in Cairo, described by Slate in 2015 as "Shanghai on the Nile" due to its burgeoning Chinese food scene.

In 2000, periodical Flavor and Fortune recorded between 7 and 8 restaurants in Cairo and around "a dozen" in the country, although the number was increasing.

In 2020, Egypt's Health Ministry launched a campaign aimed at inspecting Chinese restaurants over food safety concerns in light of the COVID-19 pandemic; however, Egypt denied reports that premises were being raided.

=== Germany ===
In 1923, one of Germany's first Chinese restaurants opened in the Kantstraße region of Berlin, known for its large Chinese community. By 1966, there were 100 Chinese restaurants across Germany; in 1992 this had increased to over 3,000.

Today, Chinese restaurants can be found throughout Germany to the extent that, in 2016, almost every German city with a population of over 15,000 has at least a single Chinese restaurant. The largest concentration is found in Berlin where restaurants have been known to pair traditional Sichuan- and Shanghai-inspired dishes with German wines. Many students from China and Hong Kong studying in Germany open Chinese restaurants.

=== Netherlands ===
There are many Chinese restaurants in the Netherlands, although the number has fallen in the decade preceding 2019. The first Chinese restaurant opened in the 1920s. Chinese food in the Netherlands is often inspired by Indonesian cuisine owing to the Netherlands' colonisation of Indonesia.

In 2019, it was reported that the previous decade had seen a 22% decline in the number of Chinese-Indonesian restaurants in the Netherlands, whereas the number of other restaurants increased by 15%. Researchers attributed this to Chinese restaurants not meeting "modern" desires of consumers, including outdated décor and fatty food considered unappealing to an increasingly health-conscious population. For the Netherlands, the typical Chinese-Indonesian restaurant culture – where three cultures come together (Chinese, Indonesian and Dutch) – has been acknowledged as Dutch intangible cultural heritage.

In 2020, a number of Chinese restaurants began trialling the use of service robots, including in Renesse and Maastricht. A study published in 2019 raised concerns regarding labour trafficking in Chinese restaurants in the country, due to the migrants' "vulnerability to exploitation" and urged protection for migrants against "extreme forms of labour exploitation" seen across Europe.

=== United Kingdom ===
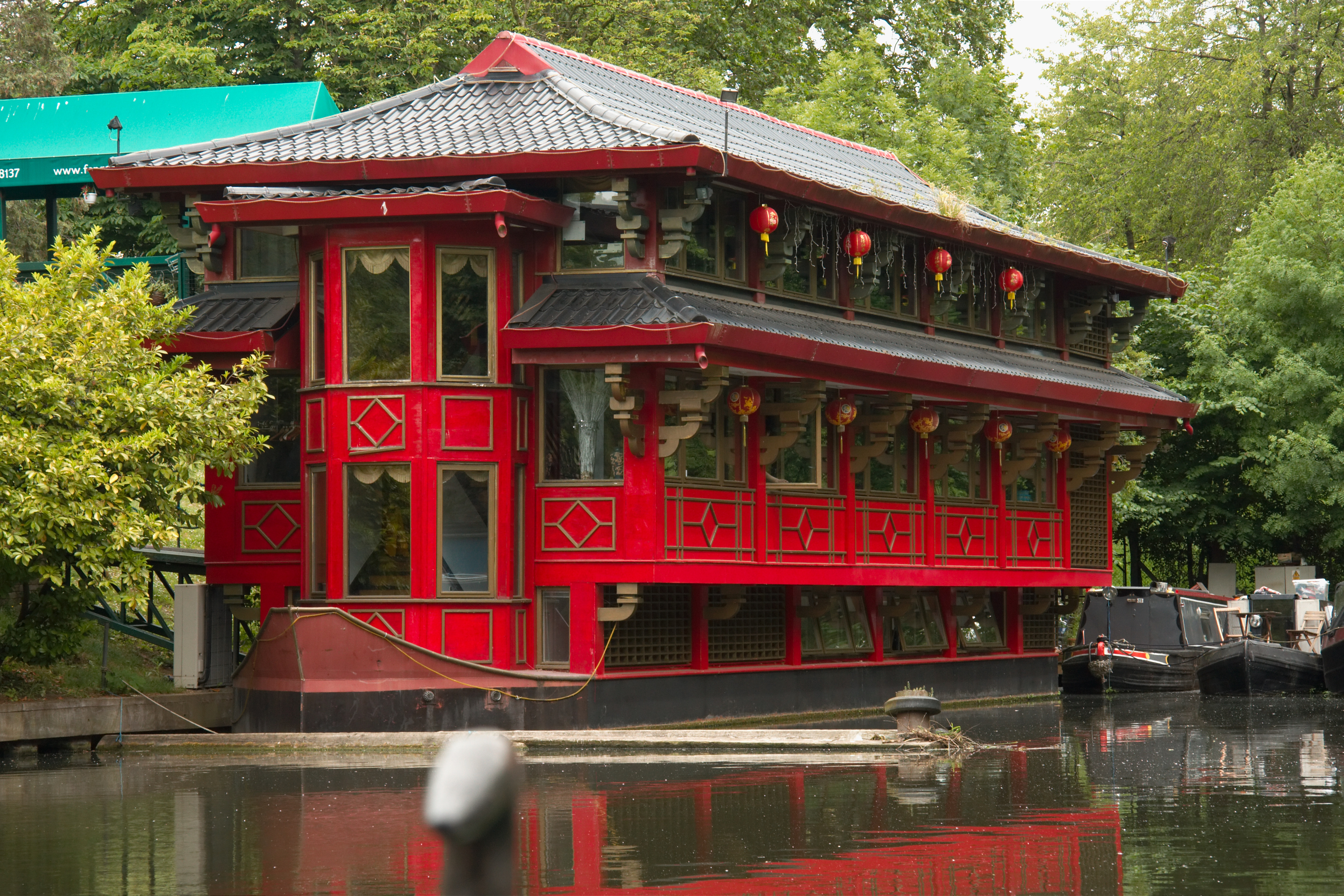
The Feng Shang Princess, a floating Chinese restaurant in Regent's Park, Primrose Hill, London

In the early 1880s, Chinese food items and eating houses appeared in London and Liverpool, mainly visited by Chinese seamen and students.

In 1884, Chinese food was made available as part of an exhibition featuring a restaurant in the International Health Exhibition in South Kensington, London. In 1907 or 1908, the first recorded Chinese restaurant was opened in London. The rise in the number of Chinese restaurants in the UK only began after the Second World War, and has been attributed to returning service personnel from Hong Kong. The restaurants were operated by Hong Kongers who moved to the UK. One restaurant that stands out in the history of Chinese restaurants in the UK is the Kuo Yuan which in 1963 was the first restaurant to serve Peking duck.

In 2003, the first British Chinese restaurant achieved a Michelin star. In the United Kingdom, the business employed a large percentage of Chinese immigrants in the 1980s (90% in 1985). Opening a restaurant or takeaway gave a relatively low capital cost entry for Chinese families into self-employment. Many takeaways served a pseudo-Chinese cuisine based around western tastes, and the limited cooking skills and experience of the shop owners.

In 2011, the Ming-Ai (London) Institute launched the British Chinese Food Culture project with a grant from the Heritage Lottery Fund, aimed at exploring and tracking the changes in Chinese food throughout its history in the United Kingdom.

The COVID-19 pandemic negatively impacted many Chinese restaurants in the UK, with a number of restaurants in London's Chinatown in particular facing financial difficulty, due to lockdown restrictions and social distancing as well as prejudice against Chinese takeaways, which the BBC described as "unfounded".

=== United States ===
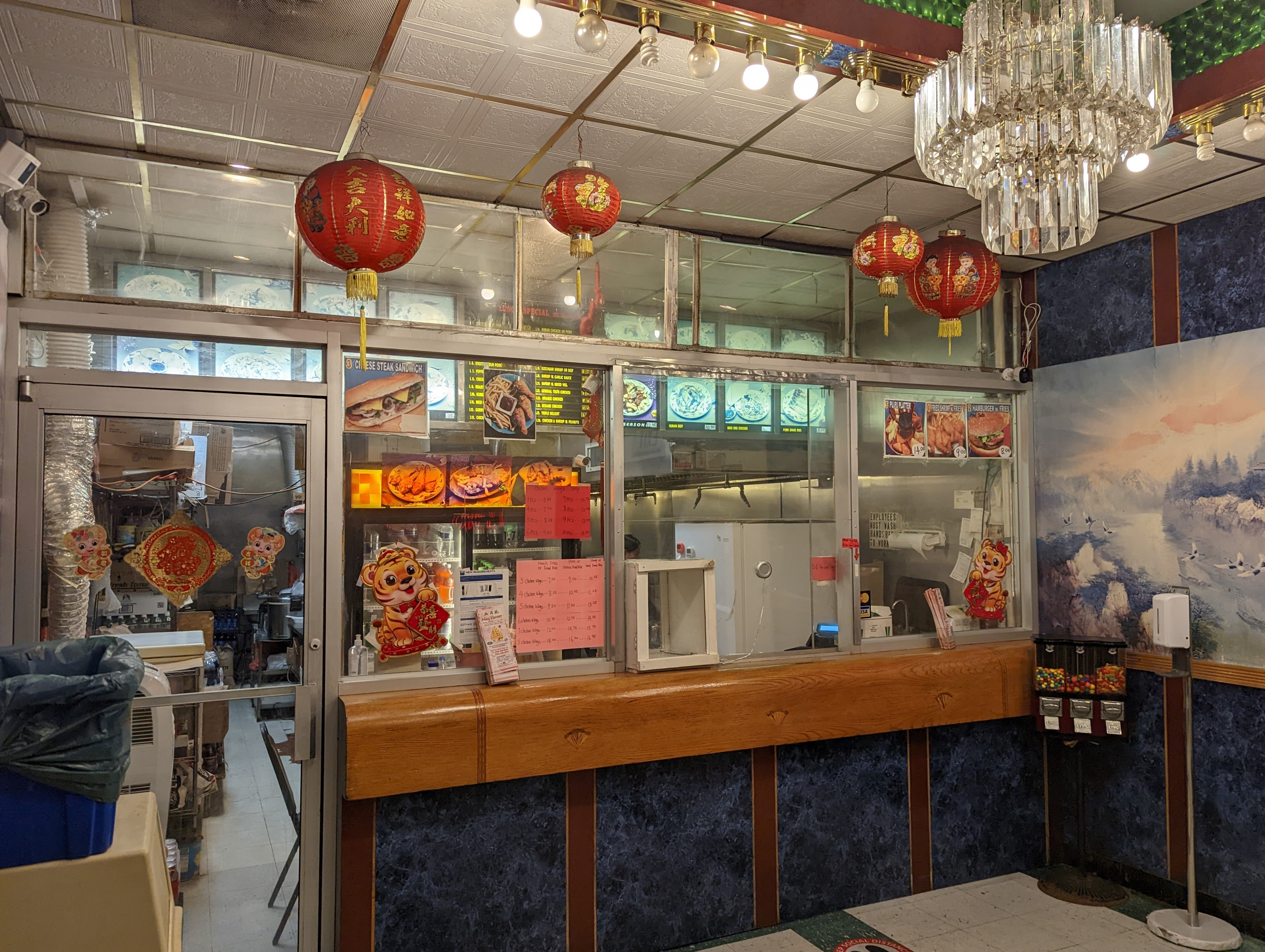
The front desk of a Chinese takeout in Washington, D.C.

Chinese restaurants in the United States began during the California Gold Rush, which brought twenty to thirty thousand immigrants across from the Canton (Kwangtung or Guangdong) region of China. The first documented Chinese restaurant opened in 1849 as the Canton Restaurant. By 1850, there were five restaurants in San Francisco. Soon after, significant amounts of food were being imported from China to America's west coast. The trend spread eastward with the growth of the American railways, particularly to New York City.

At the ratification of the Chinese Exclusion Act of 1882 there were only 14 restaurants in San Francisco. However, the Chinese Exclusion Act allowed merchants to enter the country, and in 1915 restaurant owners became eligible for merchant visas. This fueled the opening of Chinese restaurants as an immigration vehicle. The Chinese Exclusion Act forced Chinese immigrants to move away from wage work to self-employment through laundries and restaurants. As of 2015, the U.S. had 46,700 Chinese restaurants.

There has been a consequential component of Chinese immigration of illegal origin, including Fuzhou people from Fujian Province and Wenzhounese from Zhejiang Province in Mainland China, specifically destined to work in Chinese restaurants in New York City, beginning in the 1980s. Adapting Chinese cooking techniques to local produce and tastes has led to the development of American Chinese cuisine. Many of the Chinese restaurant menus in the U.S. are printed in Chinatown, Manhattan.

== See also ==
- Chinatown
- Chinese takeout container
- List of Chinese restaurants
- List of restaurants in China
