= List of Chinese restaurants =

This is a list of notable Chinese restaurants. A Chinese restaurant is an establishment that serves Chinese cuisine outside China. Some have distinctive styles, as with American Chinese cuisine and Canadian Chinese cuisine. Most of them are in the Cantonese restaurant style. Chinese takeouts (United States and Canada) or Chinese takeaways (United Kingdom and Commonwealth) are also found either as components of eat-in establishments or as separate establishments, and serve a take-out version of Chinese cuisine.

== Chinese restaurants ==
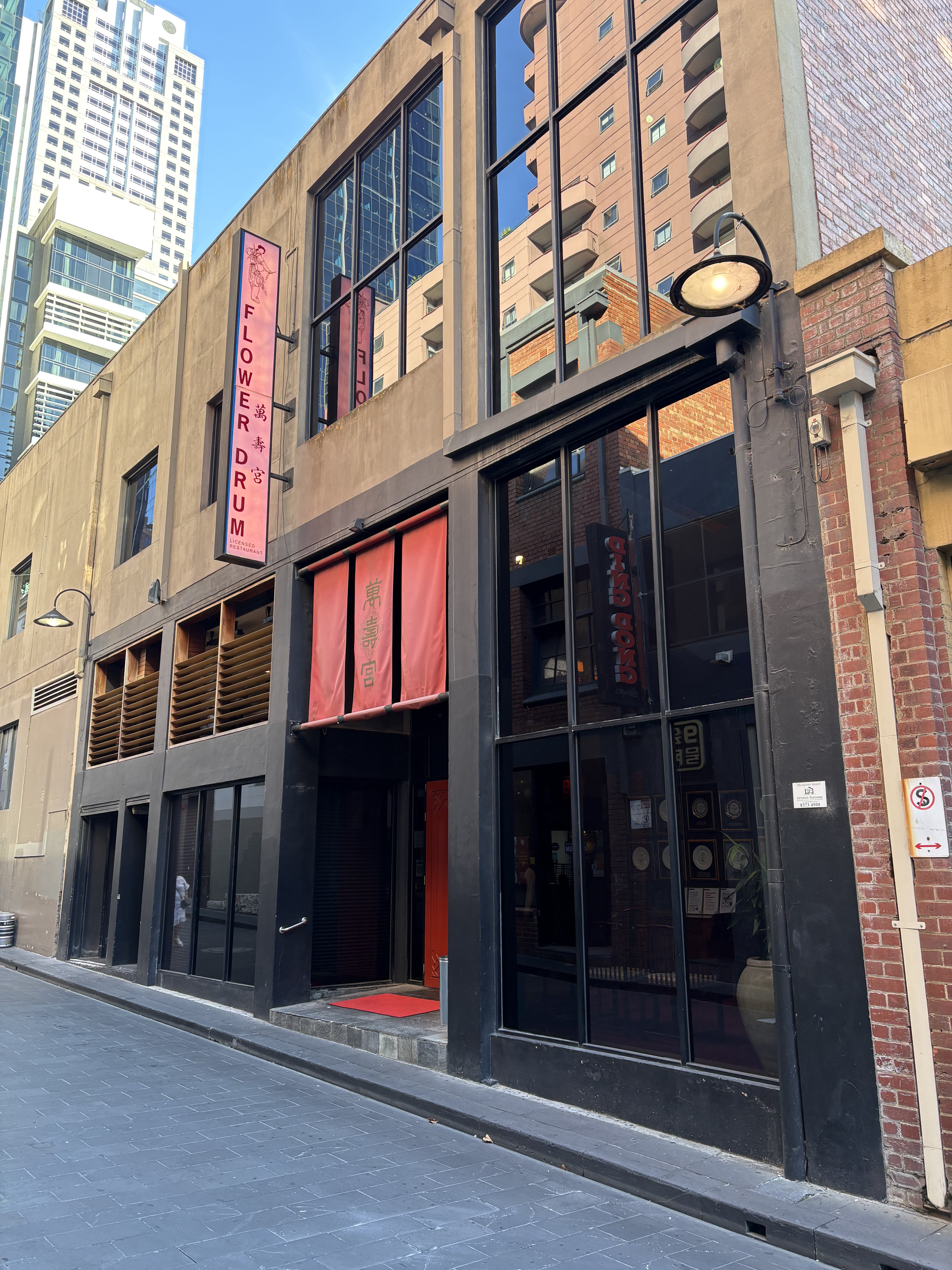
Flower Drum, in Melbourne, Australia

- aKin, Canada
- Celeste Imperio
- Chef's Choice Seafood
- China Coast
- China Tang
- Crystal Jade
- Din Tai Fung
- Flower Drum, Melbourne, Australia
- Hakkasan, London, U.K.
- Heichinrou
- Jing Fong
- Joe's Shanghai
- Jumbo Seafood
- Kai Mayfair
- Kuo Yuan
- Leeann Chin
- Manchu Wok
- Mandarin Restaurant
- Maxim's Catering
- Mr Chow
- Nam Kee
- Noodle Box
- Peter Chang's
- Pick Up Stix
- The Pine, Canada
- Sam Woo Restaurant
- Seaport City Seafood, Vancouver, British Columbia
- Sichuan Food
- Sunnys Chinese
- To Ho Panciteria Antigua, Manila
- Tom's BaoBao
- Wong Kei
- Yauatcha, London, U.K.

=== United States ===
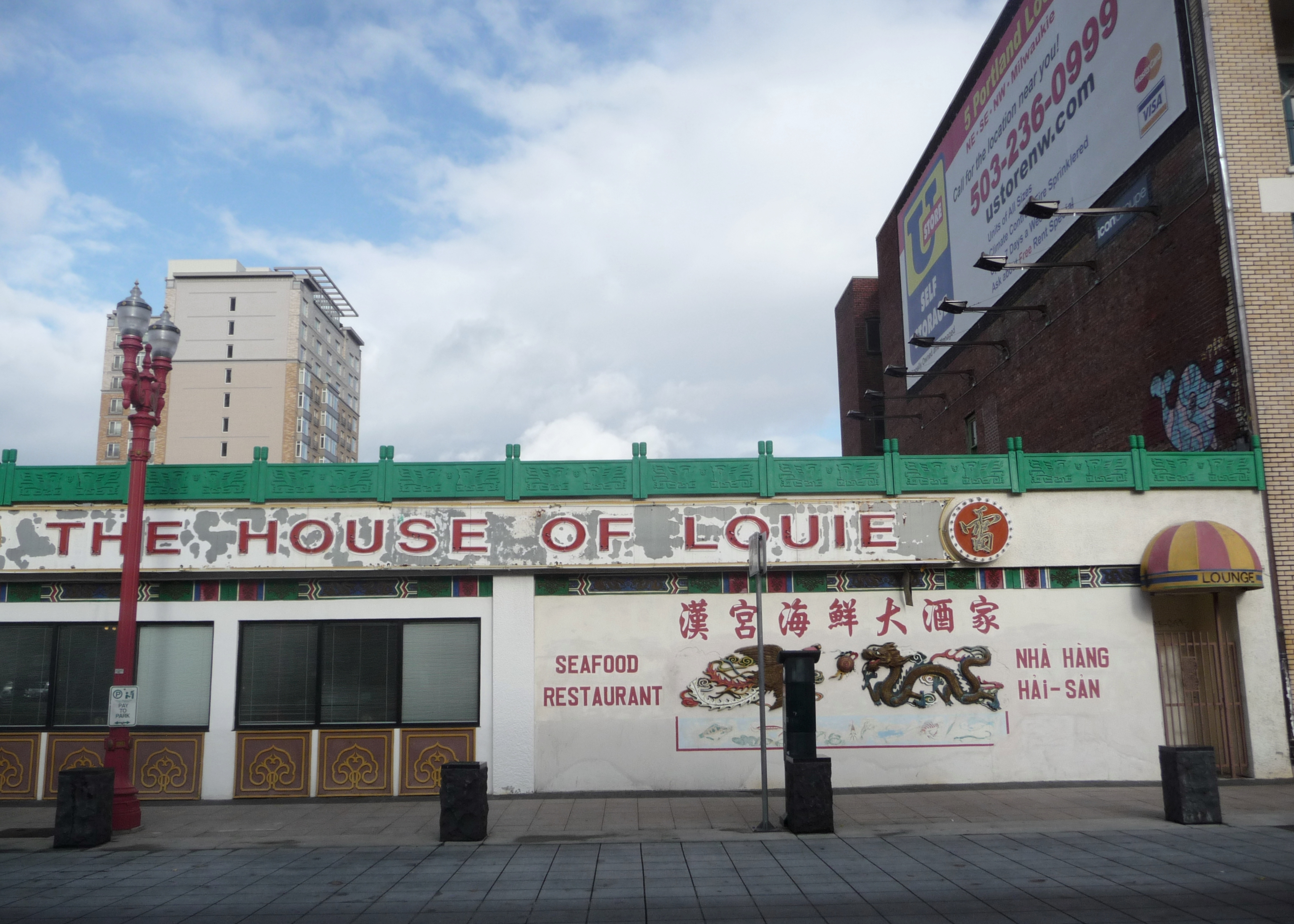
House of Louie, Portland, Oregon

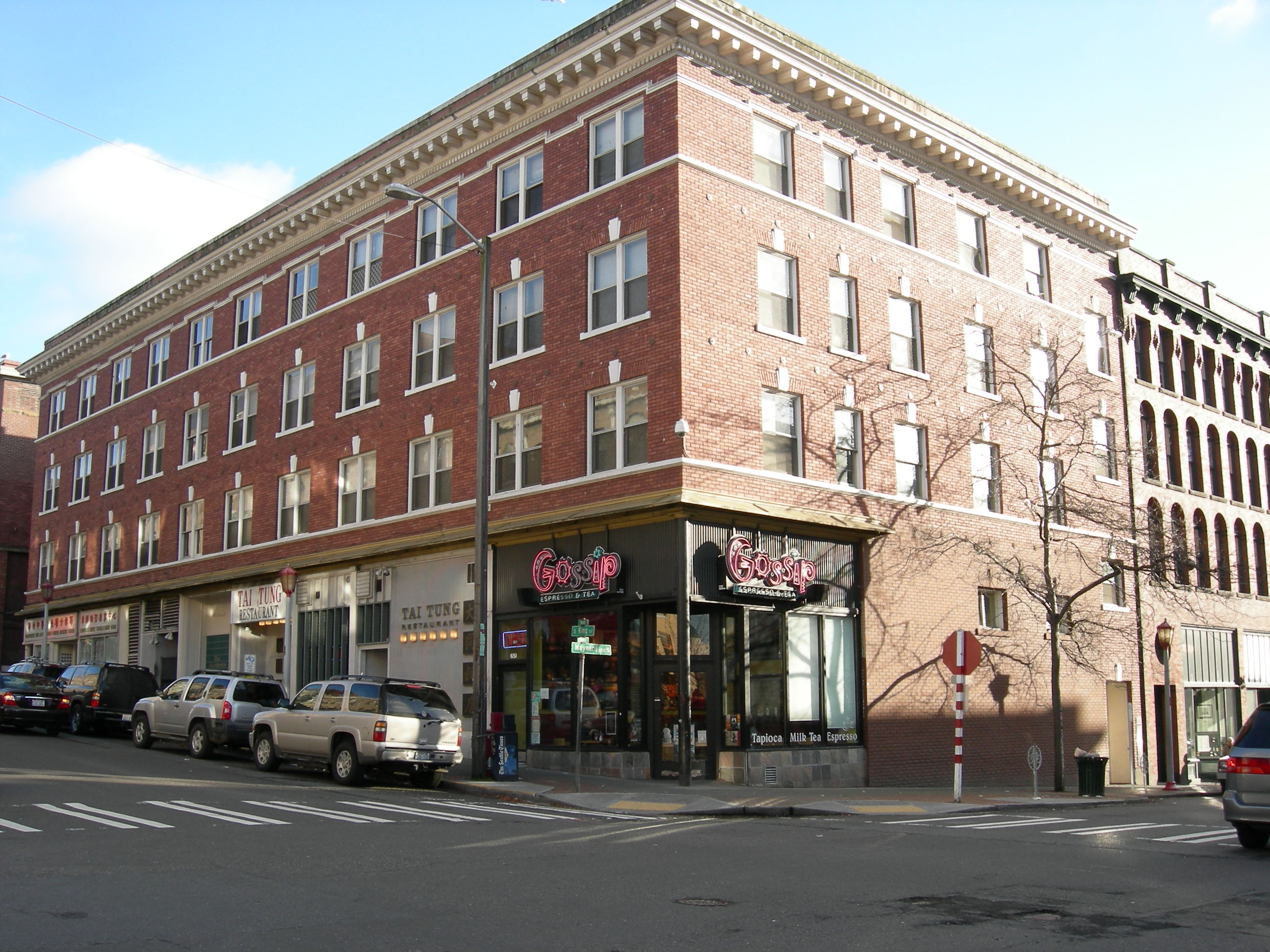
Tai Tung, Seattle

Notable Chinese restaurants in the United States include:

- A+ Hong Kong Kitchen, Seattle
- Ambassador Restaurant and Lounge, Portland, Oregon
- Bing Mi, Portland, Oregon
- Bistro Na's, Temple City, California
- Café China, New York City
- Canton Grill, Portland, Oregon
- CheLi, New York City
- Chengdu Taste
- Country Dough, Seattle
- Dim Sum King, Seattle
- Dough Zone
- Duck House Chinese Restaurant, Portland, Oregon
- Excellent Cuisine, Portland, Oregon
- Fat Choy, Englewood, New Jersey
- Fong Chong, Portland, Oregon
- Formosa Cafe, West Hollywood, California
- Frank Fat's, Sacramento, California
- Frank's Noodle House, Oregon
- Gado Gado, Portland, Oregon
- Handpulled Noodle, New York City
- Happy Dragon Chinese Restaurant, Oregon
- Harbor City Restaurant, Seattle
- HK Cafe, Portland, Oregon
- Hop Kee, New York City
- House of Louie, Portland, Oregon
- Hunan Restaurant, Portland, Oregon
- Hung Far Low, Portland, Oregon
- Imperial Dynasty, Hanford, California
- Jade Garden Restaurant, Seattle
- Jade Rabbit, Portland, Oregon
- Joyale Seafood Restaurant, Seattle
- Kenny's Noodle House, Portland, Oregon
- Kim Sơn, Houston, Texas
- Lan Sheng, New York City
- Legin
- Lei
- Mama Chow's Kitchen, Portland, Oregon
- Mama Lu's Dumpling House, Monterey Park, California
- Master Kong, Portland, Oregon
- Mee Sum Pastry, Seattle
- Mei Sum Bakery, Portland, Oregon
- Mike's Noodle House, Seattle
- Mister Jiu's, San Francisco
- New Cathay, Portland, Oregon
- Nom Wah Tea Parlor, New York, New York
- Ocean City Seafood Restaurant, Portland, Oregon
- Old Mandarin Islamic Restaurant, San Francisco
- Oma's Hideaway, Portland, Oregon
- The Pagoda, Portland, Oregon
- P. F. Chang's
- Panda Express
- Panda Inn
- Pei Wei Asian Diner
- Pike Place Chinese Cuisine, Seattle
- Republic Cafe and Ming Lounge, Portland, Oregon
- Regent Bakery and Cafe, Seattle metropolitan area
- Seattle Harbor, Washington
- Shanghai Garden Restaurant, Seattle
- Shanghai's Best, Portland, Oregon
- Shandong, Portland, Oregon
- Shun Lee Palace
- Stretch the Noodle, Portland, Oregon
- Szechuan Mountain House, New York City
- Tai Tung, Seattle
- Tasty Corner Chinese Restaurant
- Wei Wei, Portland, Oregon
- Wing Lei, Las Vegas, Nevada
- Wo Hop, Chinatown, New York
- Wong's King, Portland, Oregon
- Xi'an Famous Foods, New York, New York
- Xi'an Noodles, Seattle metropolitan area
- XLB, Portland, Oregon
- Yaowarat, Portland, Oregon
- Yingtao
- Yummy House Bakery, Seattle

== See also ==
- List of Chinese desserts
- List of Chinese dishes
- List of restaurants in China
- Lists of restaurants
