= Sichuan food =

Sichuan food or Szechuan food can refer to:

- Sichuan Food (restaurant) - Michelin starred restaurant in The Netherlands
- Sichuan cuisine - cooking style originating in the Chinese province Sichuan
