= CheLi (restaurant) =

Chinese restaurant in New York City, U.S.

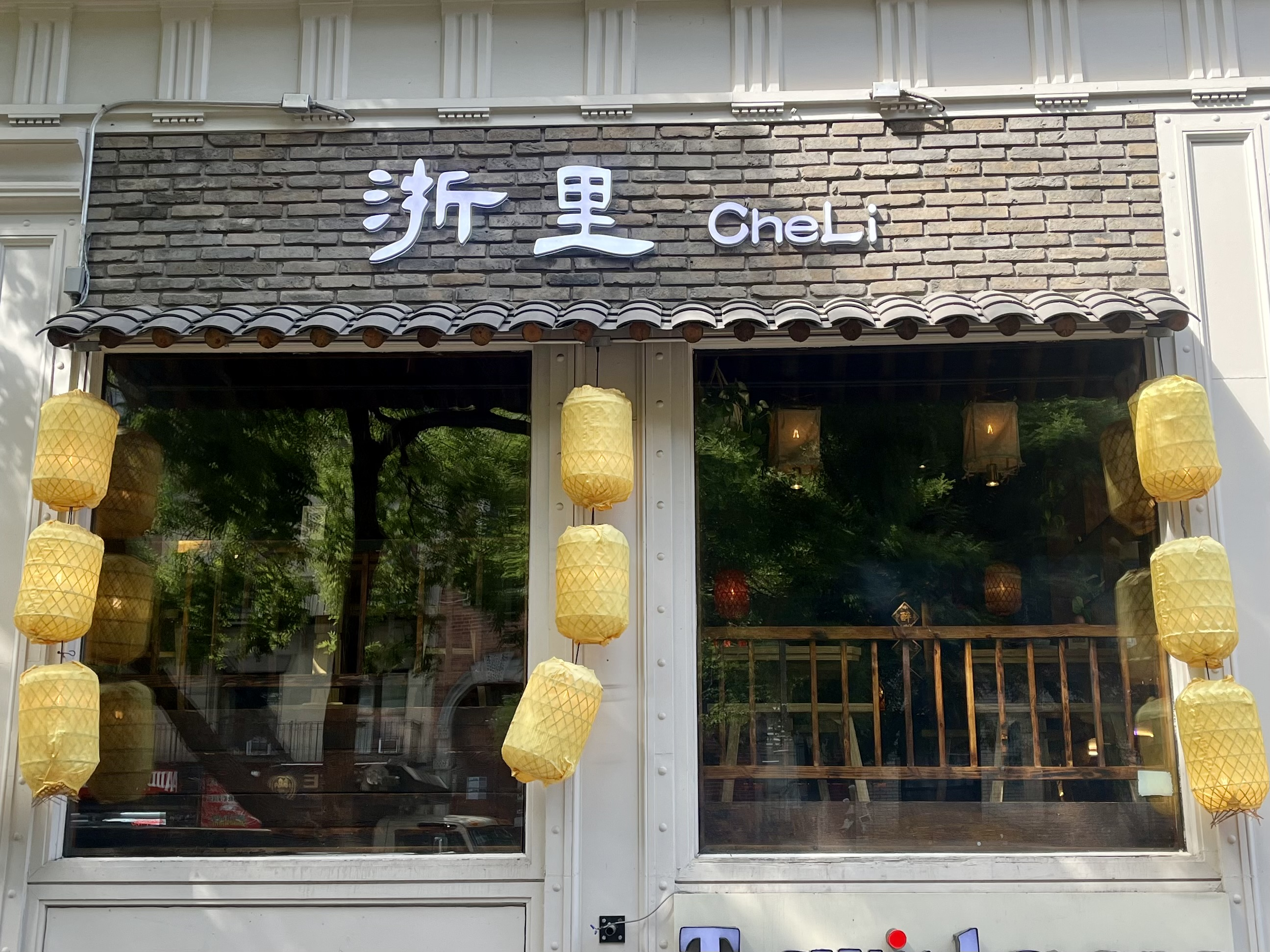
- The restaurant's exterior in 2024
- Interactive map of CheLi

Restaurant information
- Established: November 2020
- Owner: DaShan Restaurant Group
- Food type: Chinese (Shanghainese)
- Location: 19 Saint Marks Place, New York City, New York, 10003, United States
- Coordinates: 40°43′45″N 73°59′19″W
- Other locations: 39th Avenue (Flushing, Queens)
- Website: www.che-li.com

CheLi is a Chinese restaurant in the East Village neighborhood of Manhattan on St Mark's Place in New York City with a second location in Flushing, Queens on 39th Avenue. The restaurant serves Shanghainese cuisine such as XLB and is owned by DaShan Restaurant Group, the same group as Szechuan Mountain House next door.

== See also ==
- List of Chinese restaurants
