= China Harbor =

China Harbor may refer to:

- China Harbour Engineering Company
- Seattle Harbor, a restaurant in Seattle, Washington, formerly known as China Harbor
