= Jade Garden Restaurant =

Chinese restaurant in Seattle, Washington, U.S.

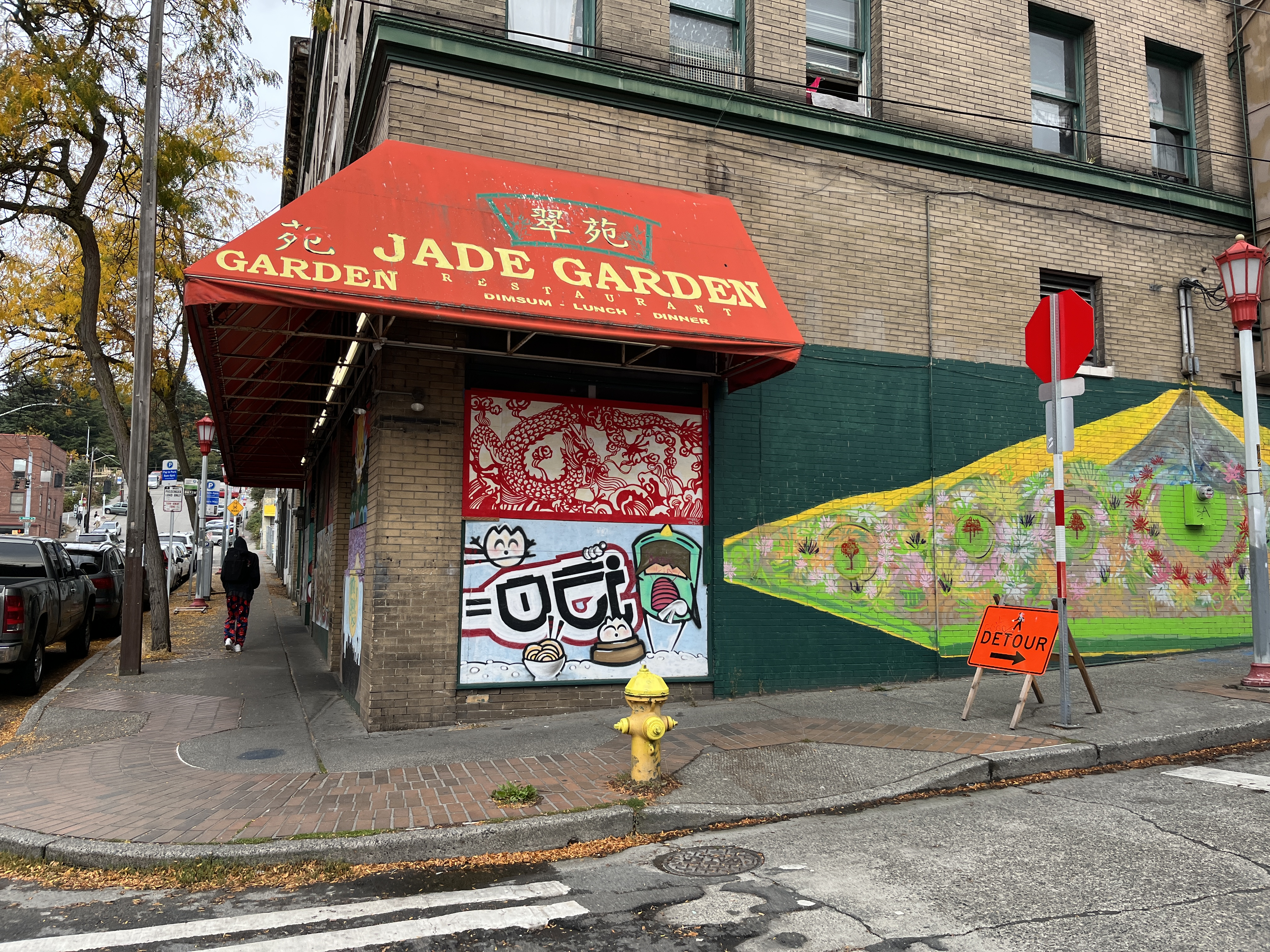
- The restaurant's exterior, 2022
- Interactive map of Jade Garden Restaurant

Restaurant information
- Food type: Chinese
- Location: 424 7th Avenue South, Seattle, Washington, 98104, United States
- Coordinates: 47°35′54.7″N 122°19′24.8″W

Jade Garden Restaurant (Chinese: 翠苑酒家) is a Chinese restaurant in Seattle, in the U.S. state of Washington.

== Description ==
Jade Garden Restaurant serves dim sum; the menu has included dumplings, steamed pork buns, prawns, and hot and sour soup. For Lunar New Year, the restaurant has served cakes with Chinese sausage, dried shrimp, taro, and dried daikon. Murals have been painted at the restaurant.

== History ==
The restaurant is owned by Eric Chan. Jade Garden was remodeled c. 2019. During the COVID-19 pandemic, the restaurant operated via take-out temporarily and was vandalized in 2020.

== Reception ==
Jenise Silva included Jade Garden in Eater Seattle's 2021 list of "Seattle Area Restaurant Dishes That Make for Great Leftovers". Additionally, Leonardo David Raymundo and Ryan Lee included the business in a list of "14 Delightful Dim Sum Restaurants in the Seattle Area". In 2022, the website's Jade Yamazaki Stewart and Jay Friedman included Jade Garden in a list of "20 Knockout Chinese and Taiwanese Restaurants in the Seattle Area". Jade Garden was included in The Infatuation's 2025 list of the 25 best restaurants in the Chinatown–International District.

== See also ==
- History of Chinese Americans in Seattle
- List of Chinese restaurants
