= Tai Tung (restaurant) =

Chinese restaurant in Seattle, Washington, U.S.

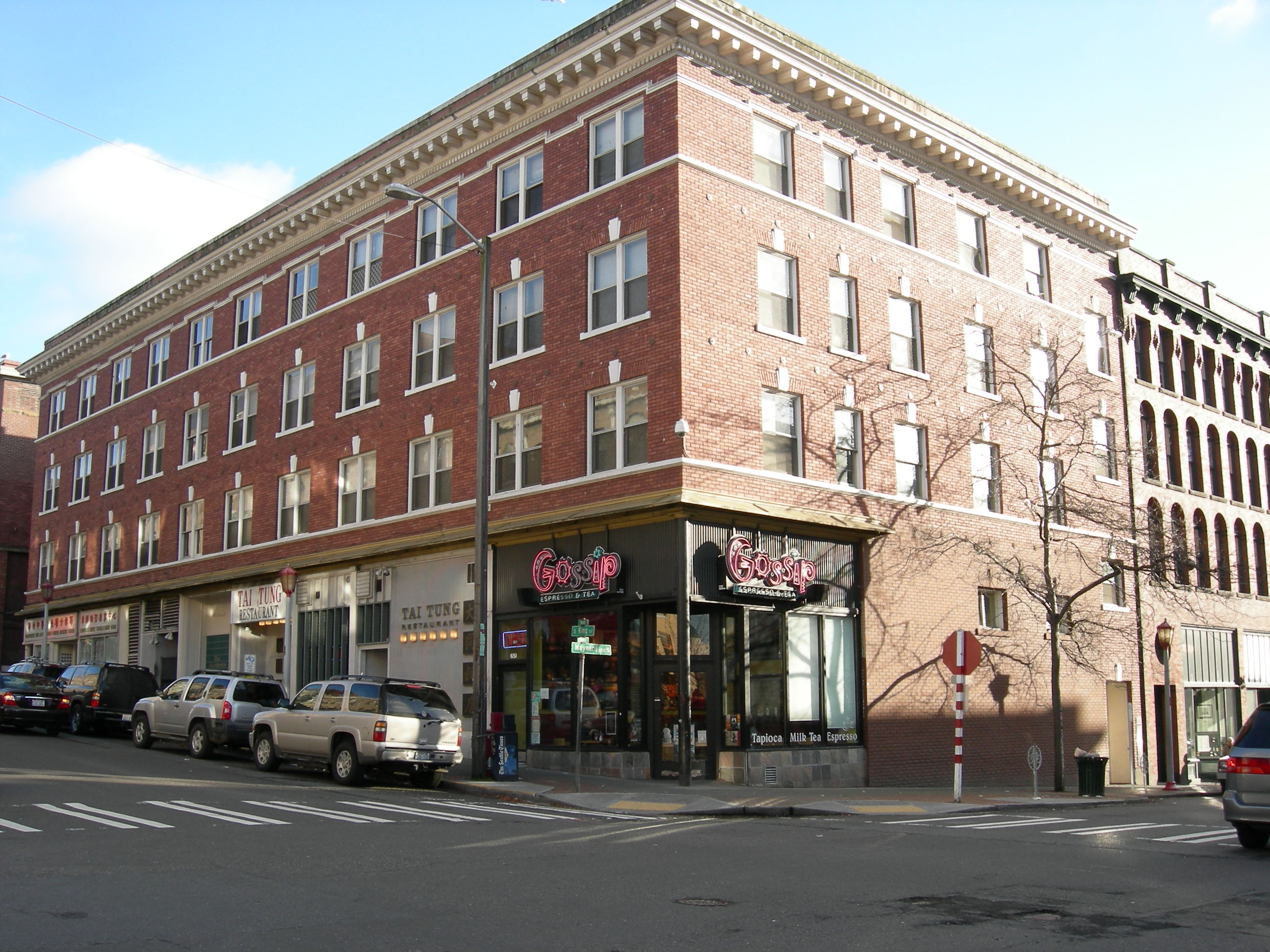
- Tai Tung on the ground floor of Rex Hotel building, International District, Seattle, circa 2007
- Interactive map of Tai Tung

Restaurant information
- Established: January 1, 1935
- Owner: Harry Chan
- Food type: Chinese
- Location: 655 South King Street, Seattle, Washington, United States
- Coordinates: 47°35′53.7″N 122°19′29.2″W
- Website: taitungrestaurant.com

Tai Tung (traditional Chinese: 大同飯店; simplified Chinese: 大同饭店) is the oldest surviving Chinese restaurant in the International District of Seattle. It was opened in 1935 by an immigrant from Hong Kong. The restaurant is the subject of a 2015 documentary, A Taste of Home, and was a location for the 2020 film The Paper Tigers. The restaurant's cellar is said to be haunted by kuei (ghosts). It is known for being busy on Christmas Day, when most Seattle restaurants are closed.

== Reception ==
Tai Tung was included in The Infatuation's 2025 list of the 25 best restaurants in the Chinatown–International District.

== See also ==
- History of Chinese Americans in Seattle
- List of Chinese restaurants
