= A+ Hong Kong Kitchen =

Chinese restaurant in Seattle, Washington, U.S.

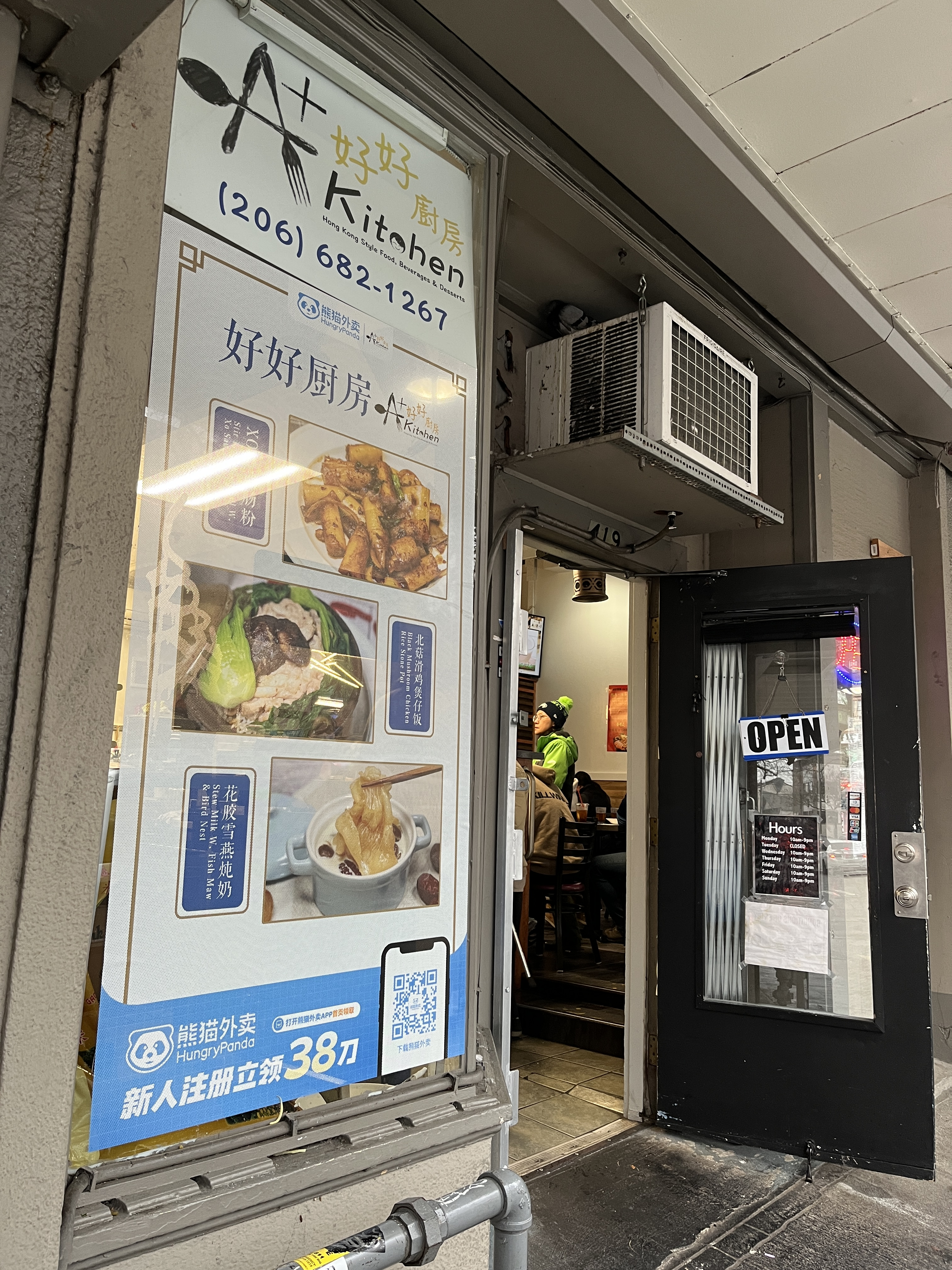
- The restaurant's exterior in 2023
- Interactive map of A+ Hong Kong Kitchen

Restaurant information
- Food type: Chinese
- Location: 419 6th Avenue S, Seattle, King, Washington, 98104, United States
- Coordinates: 47.5985°N 122.3265°W

A+ Hong Kong Kitchen (traditional Chinese: 好好廚房; simplified Chinese: 好好厨房) is a Chinese restaurant in Seattle's Chinatown–International District, in the U.S. state of Washington.

== Description ==
The Chinese restaurant A+ Hong Kong Kitchen is located in Seattle's Chinatown–International District. The menu has included fish balls in curry, rice with minced pork and salted fish, rice rolls, congee, noodle soups, pork chops and spaghetti, pineapple buns, and tea sandwiches with butter and condensed milk.

== History ==
Hoi Ning Chim manages the restaurant as of 2022.

== Reception ==
Seattle Metropolitan has said "just about every dish is fabulous". The magazine's Allecia Vermillion and Rosin Saez included the business in a 2019 list of "The Best Restaurants in Chinatown Right Now". In 2022, Seattle Metropolitan staff named A+ Hong Kong a "best lunch spot" in Central Seattle, and Hsiao-Ching Chou and Vermillion included the business in an overview of "Our Very Favorite Chinese Restaurants".

Callie Craighead included A+ Hong Kong in the Seattle Post-Intelligencer's 2020 list of "10 top-rated Chinese restaurants in Seattle's International District, according to Yelp". In 2022, Zuri Anderson of iHeart said the restaurant offers Washington's best Chinese take-out. Aimee Rizzo and Carlo Mantuano included A+ Hong Kong in The Infatuation's 2022 list of "The Best Restaurants in the International District". The business was also included in the website's 2025 list of the 25 best restaurants in the Chinatown–International District.

Caitlin Flynn selected the restaurant for Washington in Eat This, Not That's 2022 overview of "The Best Chinese Takeout in Every State". In 2022, Jay Friedman included A+ Hong Kong in Eater Seattle's list of "19 Knockout Restaurants in Seattle's Chinatown–International District", and he and Jade Yamazaki Stewart included the business in a list of "20 Knockout Chinese and Taiwanese Restaurants in the Seattle Area".

== See also ==
- List of Chinese restaurants
