= Harbor City Restaurant =

Defunct Chinese restaurants in Seattle, Washington, U.S.

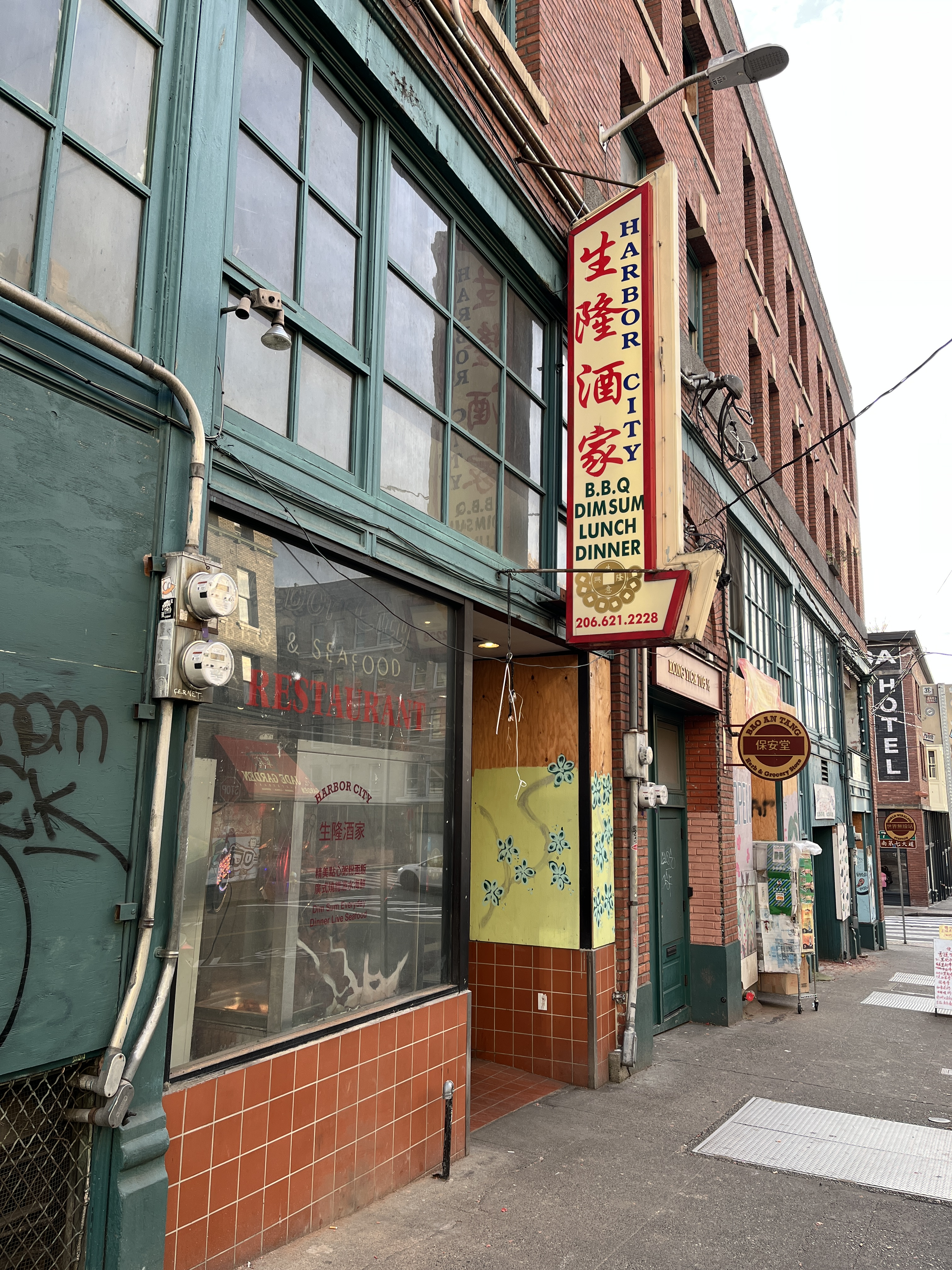
- The restaurant's exterior, 2023
- Interactive map of Harbor City Restaurant

Restaurant information
- Established: 1988
- Closed: February 28, 2025
- Food type: Chinese
- Location: 707 South King Street, Seattle, Washington, 98104, United States
- Coordinates: 47°35′53.2″N 122°19′24.1″W

Harbor City Restaurant (Chinese: 生隆酒家) was a Chinese restaurant in Seattle's Chinatown-International District, in the U.S. state of Washington. It closed permanently on February 28, 2025.

== Description ==
The Chinese restaurant Harbor City in Seattle's Chinatown-International District served dim sum; the menu included chicken feet, Chinese broccoli, egg tarts, har gow, Peking duck, shumai, and turnip cakes. According to Northwest Asian Weekly, the restaurant was popular "among the young and old for dinner and lunch."

== History ==
Harbor City was founded in 1988 by the Ngo family, who ran the restaurant until its closure in 2008. Han Ma was the restaurant's owner.

The business closed permanently on February 28, 2025.

== Reception ==
In 2013, Julia Wayne of Eater Seattle wrote, "Dim sum, and the offerings at Harbor City are among the best in town. With plenty of salty, sweet, meaty, bite-sized delights, even the more indecisive among us can find satisfaction." The website's Leonardo David Raymundo and Ryan Lee included Harbor City in a 2021 list of fourteen "delightful" dim sum establishments in the Seattle metropolitan area.

== See also ==
- History of Chinese Americans in Seattle
- List of Chinese restaurants
- List of defunct restaurants of the United States
