= Ambassador Restaurant and Lounge =

Restaurant and karaoke venue in Portland, Oregon, U.S.

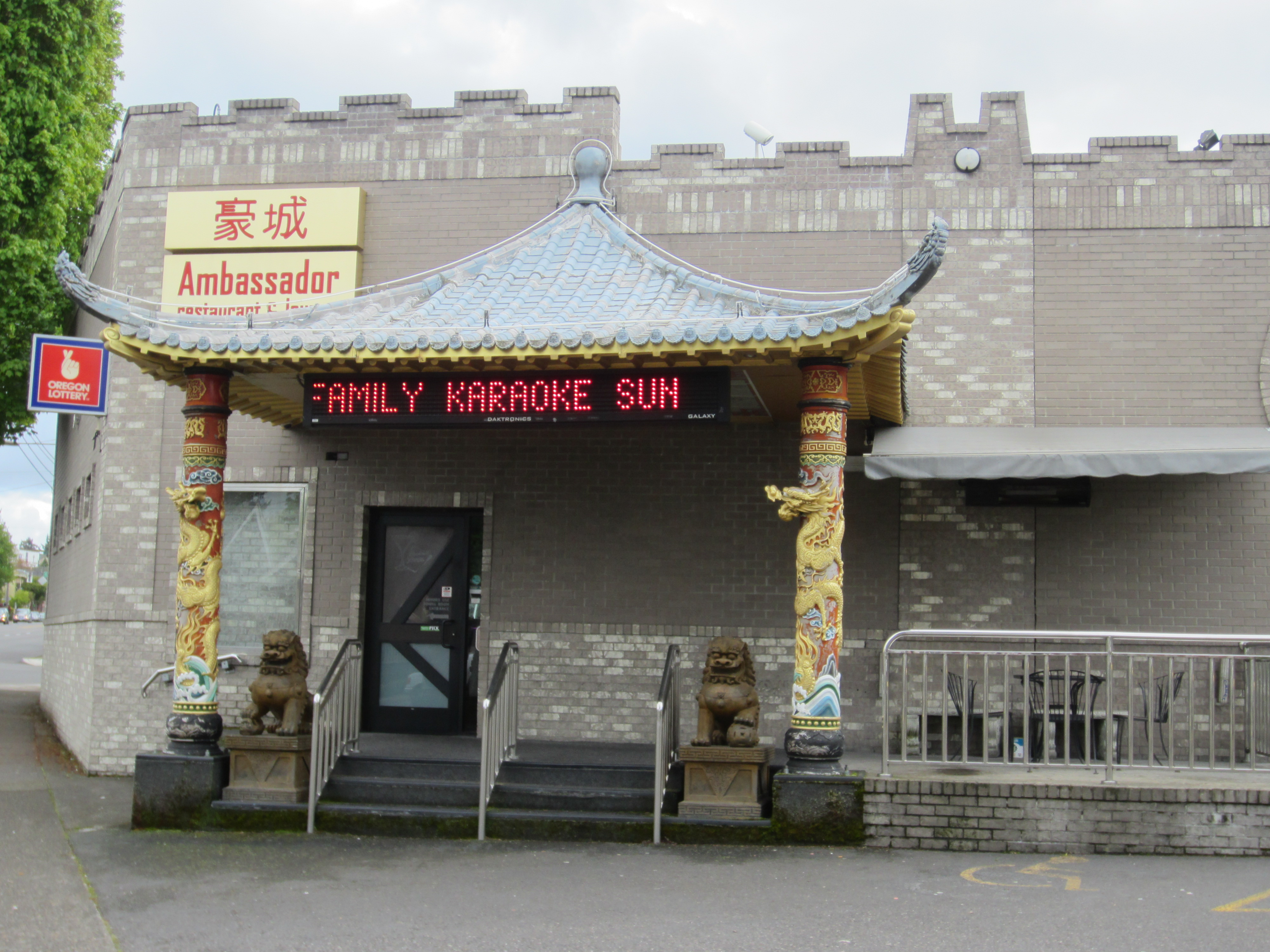
- Entrance in 2014
- Interactive map of Ambassador Restaurant and Lounge

Restaurant information
- Owner: Foo-Hong Foong
- Food type: Chinese
- Location: 4744 Northeast Sandy Boulevard, Portland, Multnomah, Oregon, 97213, United States
- Coordinates: 45.5384°N 122.6143°W
- Website: ambassadorpdx.com

Ambassador Restaurant and Lounge is a restaurant and karaoke venue in Portland, Oregon, United States.

== Description ==
Ambassador Restaurant and Lounge is located on Sandy Boulevard in northeast Portland's Rose City Park neighborhood. Portland Monthly says, "Portland's self-proclaimed oldest karaoke lounge has the song list to back up such a claim and after working up a hunger getting your groove on the traditional Chinese-American fare will put the cap on a satisfying night."

In Eater Portland's 2020 list of "14 Spots for Late-Night Dining in Portland", Alex Frane wrote, "With retro dive bar vibes, nightly karaoke, and a menu of Chinese-American classics like sweet and sour pork, chow mein, and an assortment of fried rice plates, the Ambassador has been a late-night party staple in Hollywood for over 30 years now. The restaurant and bar offers its menu and entertainment until 2:30 a.m. each day, generally to crowds."

== History ==
The business is owned by Foo-Hong Foong, as of 2019.

== Reception ==
In a 2005 overview of Portland's karaoke scene, the Portland Mercury's Justin Wescoat Sanders said of Ambassador, Chopsticks, The Alibi, and The Galaxy: "All wonderful karaoke havens in their own special way—all so crammed with caterwauling lushes on any given night that you're lucky to get a song in edgewise. Even weeknights are becoming off limits."

Grant Butler included Ambassador in The Oregonian's 2018 list of "30 great Portland bars that are still going strong". In the Portland Mercury's 2018 list of the city's 13 best karaoke venues, Emma Burke wrote, "I've never experienced as much bureaucracy at a karaoke bar as I did at the Ambassador. There's a multi-step process to sign up to sing, and I struggled to comb through the digital songbook for Lana Del Rey before realizing that you have to search artists by their last name. (As complicated as it might've been, the Ambassador's KJ was a true guardian angel.) The Chinese restaurant looks the part and takes its role very seriously as one of the city's few karaoke bars that is open daily. The elevated stage, lights, and mirrored walls make for an immersive pop-star experience, even with a small midweek audience. One of my favorite things about the Ambassador is the low volume at which they mic the singers."

== See also ==
- List of Chinese restaurants
