= Bistro Na's =

Chinese restaurant in Temple City, California

- Interactive map of Bistro Na's

Restaurant information
- Established: late 2016
- Chef: Tian Yong
- Food type: Chinese (imperial)
- Location: 9055 Las Tunas Drive, Suite 105, Temple City, Los Angeles, California, 91780
- Coordinates: 34°6′16.94″N 118°4′20.93″W
- Website: bistronas.com

Bistro Na's
- Traditional Chinese: 那家小館
- Simplified Chinese: 那家小馆
Transcriptions
Standard Mandarin
- Hanyu Pinyin: nà jiā xiǎo guǎn

Bistro Na's (Chinese: 那家小馆) is a Chinese restaurant in Temple City, California. The restaurant specializes in Chinese imperial cuisine.

== Background ==
According to LA Weekly food critic David Chan, Los Angeles County has predominated the "Chinese cuisine in the United States". However, high-end Chinese restaurants had been infrequent in the area, including short-lived ones, and "would [...] easily be found in China". Also, many food critics and "rich Chinese" of the area were unimpressed with generally Chinese restaurants, including high-end ones. Chan explained the rarity of high-end Chinese restaurants: most Chinese restaurants had set their meals to low prices, and "the ultra-expensive Chinese food in the San Gabriel Valley" had been usually "Hong Kong–style restaurants serving live seafood" usually imported from overseas.

== History ==
Beijing-based restaurant group Na Jia Xiao Guan (那家小馆) has fifteen branches in China and has used recipes from the Imperial China-era. An ancestor of the group's founder was a doctor of an Imperial Court.

The group opened its first North American branch Bistro Na's at a strip mall of Temple City, California, in late 2016. The restaurant has specialized in Chinese imperial cuisine. Its interior setting is "regal": the dining room uses red and gold colors, and there are "intricate, warm wood moldings". The restaurant also has private rooms, including ones "with big, round tables for banquet-style feasts".

One of the chefs is Tian Yong, who has had over twenty-five years of experience as of July 2021 and previously worked at the Grand Mansion Restaurant and at the 2008 Summer Olympics, both in Beijing.

== Menu ==
Best-selling dishes in May 2017 were US$24 crispy shrimp (酥皮大明虾), $39 prime beef rib, $36 peppered lamb chop, and $20 Emperor's Jar soup (beef tendon, mushroom, fish maw, quail egg, and sea cucumber). The menu also offered a $35.50 two-person set, which "include[d] a tofu skin salad, crispy shrimp, baby mustard heart vegetables, Emperor's Jar Soup [...], milkfish, and fresh pear juice."

Besides crispy shrimp, the menu further includes smoke pork ribs, Na's Braised Pork Belly, Na's Steamed Chicken, Chili Tofu Skin Salad, steamed egg with tofu sticks, Na's Secret Tofu (deep-fried tofu on bok choy leaves served with dipping sauce), Cucumber and Radish Salad, Fried Mixed Mushrooms with Rice Cracker Bites, okra in seasoned dressing, Stir-fried Pea Sprouts with Mushrooms, dried shrimp with napa cabbage, steamed king crab dishes (including one Dungeness crab with pumpkin and the other crab with ginger and scallion), sea cucumber with beef tendon, braised abalone with sea cucumber, kung pao lobster, old Beijing pancakes, and noodle dishes like Beijing Zhajian Noodles. Desserts included sweet fried rice cake, Milky Cheese "pudding in a fish-shaped mold", and a "platter of mochi and cakes".

The restaurant's "high-quality ingredients" include "fresh tofu skin, American lamb chops, Canadian jumbo scallops, and South American prawns". A chef Tian Yong has intended to cook "distinct dishes" rather than dishes similarly found in "other Chinese restaurants".

== Reception ==
Bistro Na's earned its Best Chinese Restaurant nomination for the 2018 Global Cuisine Awards. It lost to another Los Angeles restaurant Chengdu Taste (滋味成都).

The restaurant earned its first Michelin star in June 2019. In the same period, however, food critic Bill Addison of Los Angeles Times criticized the restaurant's "mediocre cooking", even with its "far grander setting".

In 2021, Michelin-starred California-based chefs, including Jon Yao, praised the restaurant's "best-executed Chinese food".

Until its star loss in December 2022, Bistro Na's was the only Michelin-starred Chinese restaurant in the Los Angeles area.

== See also ==
- List of Chinese restaurants
