= Mama Lu's Dumpling House =

Chinese restaurants in the United States

Restaurant information
- Established: Before 2008
- Food type: Xiaolongbao, Chinese
- Dress code: Casual
- Location: 153 E. Garvey Ave., Monterey Park, California, 91754, United States

Mama Lu's Dumpling House is a chain of independently-operated Chinese restaurants, primarily located in the San Gabriel Valley of Los Angeles County, California, known for their xiaolongbao, dumplings, and rice cakes.

== Reception ==
Critics praise Mama Lu's xiaolongbao and list it among the best xiaolongbao restaurants in the San Gabriel Valley. Time Out called the xiaolongbao "fantastic", noting that the skin is "nicely supple but tough enough...without easily tearing". As of 2018, it is very popular and known for its long lines, and the San Gabriel Valley Tribune praised its food for being worth the wait. Tony Chen of Eater, however, called Mama Lu's xiaolongbao "the same as all others" but acknowledged that "people love it". The quality of the food and long lines lend themselves to comparisons with fellow popular Chinese restaurant Din Tai Fung. Kristie Hang of the LAist observed the xiaolongbao of Mama Lu's had a thicker skin and "denser broth" than those of Din Tai Fung. The Tiger agreed but compared the quality of Mama Lu's service unfavorably to that of Din Tai Fung's. Though best known for xiaolongbao, Mama Lu's has also received praise for its green onion pancakes and other dishes. Demand for its dumplings spike around traditional Chinese holidays, such as the Lunar New Year.

== History ==
Mama Lu's Dumpling House was first opened at 153 E. Garvey Ave. in Monterey Park, California before 2008. By 2012, two more restaurants were operating in the city: according to Tony Chen of Eater, one had opened down the street at 501 W. Garvey after Lu's Dumpling House had on Garfield. In April 2014, the latter closed when a fire truck smashed into it.

In 2015, Anna Tang bought the restaurant's 501 W. Garvey location and has operated it and the Mama's Dumpling House in San Gabriel independently of the other locations.

In August and October 2018, health inspectors closed the 153 E Garvey location for two days due to violations. Formerly owned by siblings Yan Lu and William Lu, the restaurant underwent a sales tax audit that year, resulting in imprisonment for sales tax evasion and payments of over US$2 million for taxes owed, including interest, and the cost of the audit.

Mama Lu's Dumpling House opened new locations in Chinatown on May 2, 2023, taking over from the former CBS Seafood Restaurant on Spring Street behind Philippe's, and in Pasadena the following year. In 2025, the chain opened locations in Arcadia and Beverly Hills, as well as expanding outside of Greater Los Angeles for the first time with the opening of a location in Las Vegas.

== See also ==
- Chinese enclaves in the San Gabriel Valley
- List of Chinese restaurants
