= Xi'an Noodles =

Chain of Chinese restaurants in the U.S. state of Washington

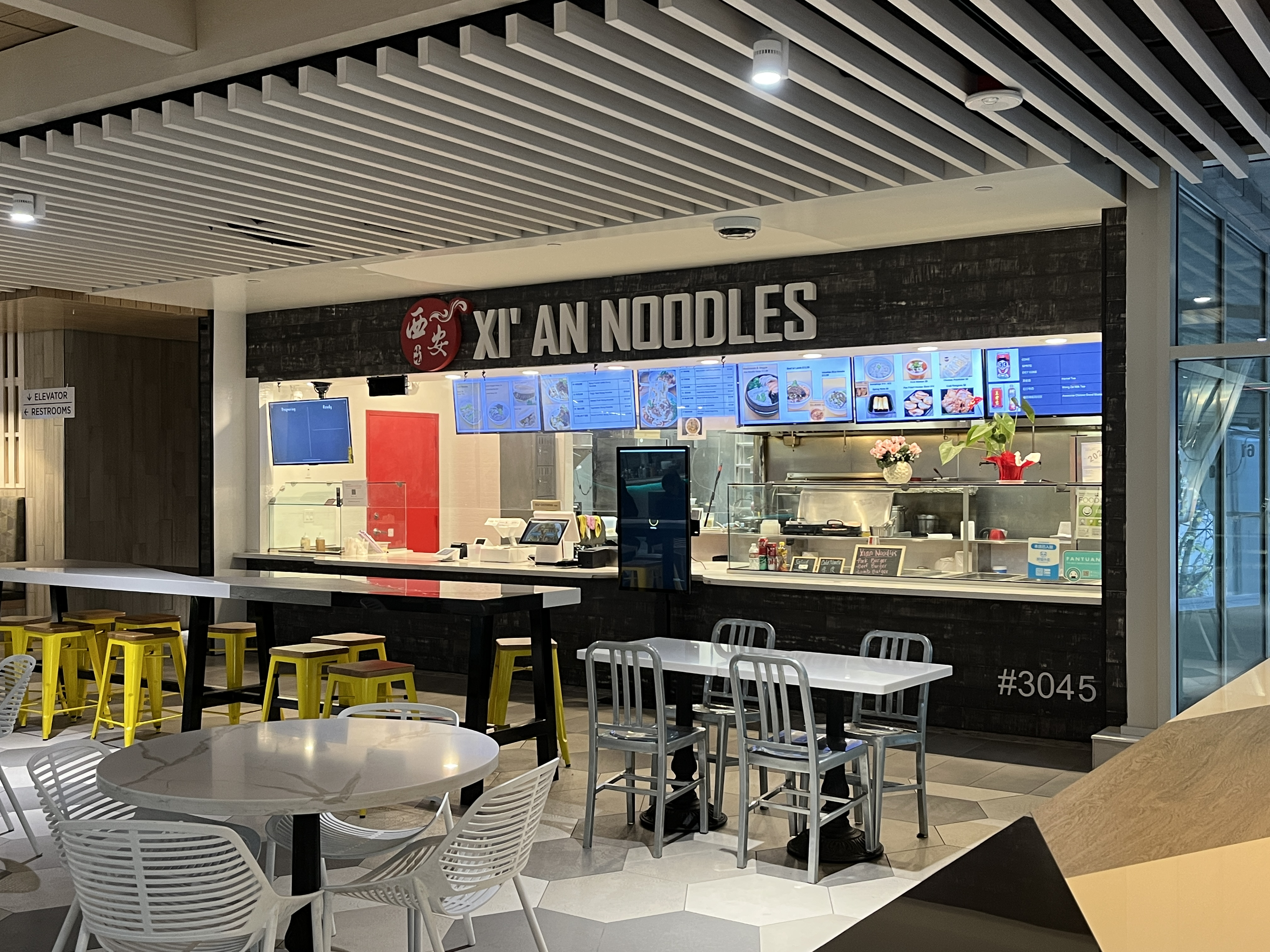
- The restaurant at Westlake Center, 2022

Restaurant information
- Established: May 2016
- Owner: Lily Wu
- Food type: Chinese
- Location: Seattle; Bellevue, Washington, United States
- Website: xiannoodles.com

Xi'an Noodles (Chinese: 西安小吃) is a small chain of Chinese restaurants in the Seattle metropolitan area, in the U.S. state of Washington. Owner Lily Wu opened the original restaurant in Seattle's University District in 2016. Locations were subsequently opened at Westlake Center in Downtown Seattle and in Bellevue.

== Description ==
The restaurant chain Xi'an Noodles has multiple locations in the Seattle metropolitan area. The business serves Chinese cuisine such as biangbiang noodles, Spicy Tingly Beef, and malatang.

== History ==
The business is owned by Lily Wu. The original restaurant opened in the University District in May 2016. A second location opened in Westlake Center in 2019. By 2022, a third location had opened in Bellevue.

== Reception ==
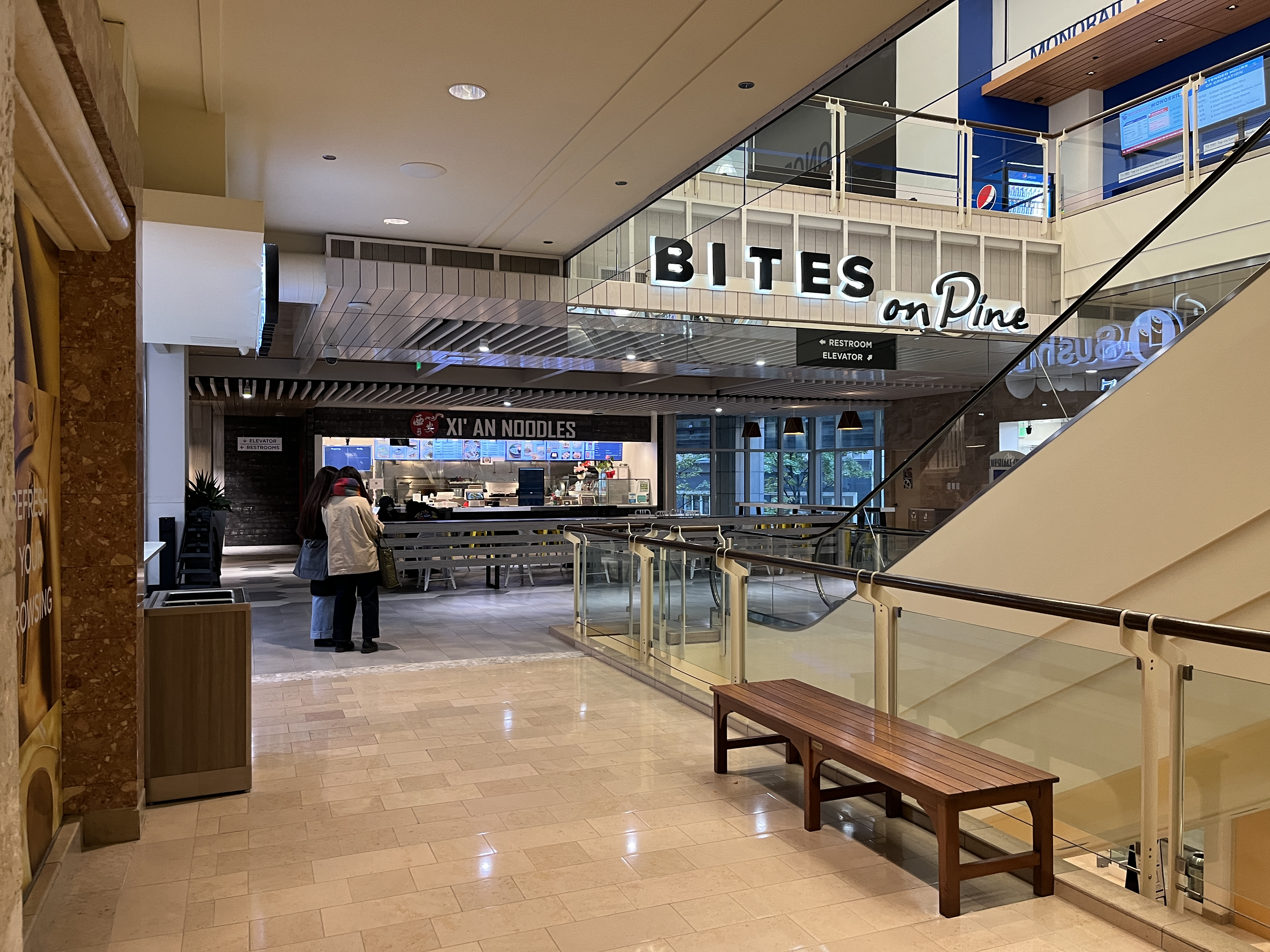
The Westlake Center location in 2022

Condé Nast Traveler says the restaurant's noodles "will warm your spirit on a cold Seattle day". Seattle Metropolitan says, "Xi'an Noodles doesn't offer much in the way of ambience, but nobody in line to place an order at the cash register much cares." The magazine has also said Wu "delivers the best version [of biangbiang noodles] currently found in city limits". Hsiao-Ching Chou and Allecia Vermillion included the business in Seattle Metropolitan's 2022 list of "our very favorite" Chinese restaurants. The magazine also named the University District location a "best lunch spot" in north Seattle in 2022. Thrillist says, "This U District noodle spot might project a cafeteria feel, but the noodle dishes are nothing like your late night dorm take-out."

Jay Friedman included the business in Eater Seattle's 2019 list of 15 "essential Asian noodle destinations" in Seattle. The website's Gabe Guarente included the biangbiang noodles in a list of "10 Seattle dishes that became stars in 2019". Friedman and Jade Yamazaki Stewart included Xi'an Noodles in Eater Seattle's 2022 list of 20 "knockout" Chinese and Taiwanese restaurants in the metropolitan area. Writers for the site also included the restaurant in 2022 lists of 14 "outstanding" restaurants in the University District and "some of the best inexpensive meals" in the city. Xi'an Noodles was included in The Infatuation's 2025 list of the best restaurants and bars in the University District.

== See also ==
- List of Chinese restaurants
- List of restaurant chains in the United States
