= Café China =

Chinese restaurant in New York City, U.S.

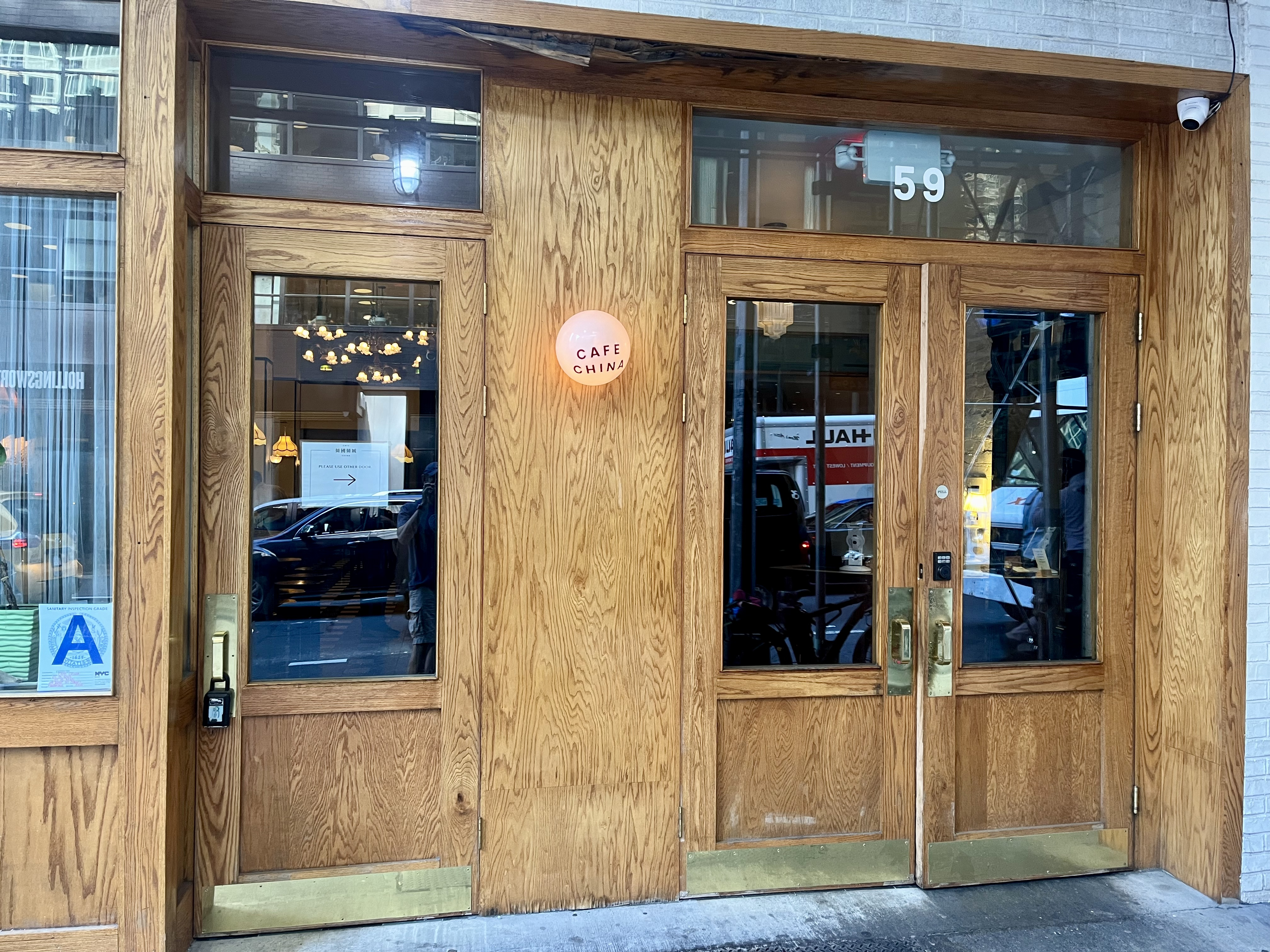
- The restaurant's exterior in 2023
- Interactive map of Café China

Restaurant information
- Established: 2011
- Owners: Xian Zhang and Yiming Wang
- Food type: Sichuan Chinese
- Location: 59 West 37th Street, New York City, New York, 10018, United States
- Coordinates: 40°45′5.7″N 73°59′9″W
- Website: https://cafechinanyc.com/

Café China is a Chinese restaurant in Midtown West, New York City serving Sichuan cuisine in a 1940s Shanghai style setting established in 2011. In 2021, the restaurant closed, moving from its original one floor location at 13 East 37th St to its current one up the block which is 3 floors. A new restaurant called Chili was opened by several former workers at Cafe China in their old location and drew ire from Cafe China accusing them of stealing their menu. The restaurant had received a Michelin star in 2013 becoming the first Chinese restaurant in NYC to receive one maintaining their star until 2020.

== See also ==
- List of Chinese restaurants
- List of Michelin-starred restaurants in New York City
