= Yingtao =

Chinese restaurant in New York City, U.S.

- Interactive map of Yingtao

Restaurant information
- Established: December 5, 2023
- Rating: (Michelin Guide)
- Location: 805 Ninth Avenue, New York, New York, 10019, United States
- Coordinates: 40°45′57″N 73°59′15″W
- Website: yingtaonyc.com

Yingtao is a Michelin-starred Chinese restaurant in New York City. The restaurant opened on December 5, 2023.

== See also ==
- List of Chinese restaurants
- List of Michelin-starred restaurants in New York City
