= Chengdu Taste =

US-based restaurant chain

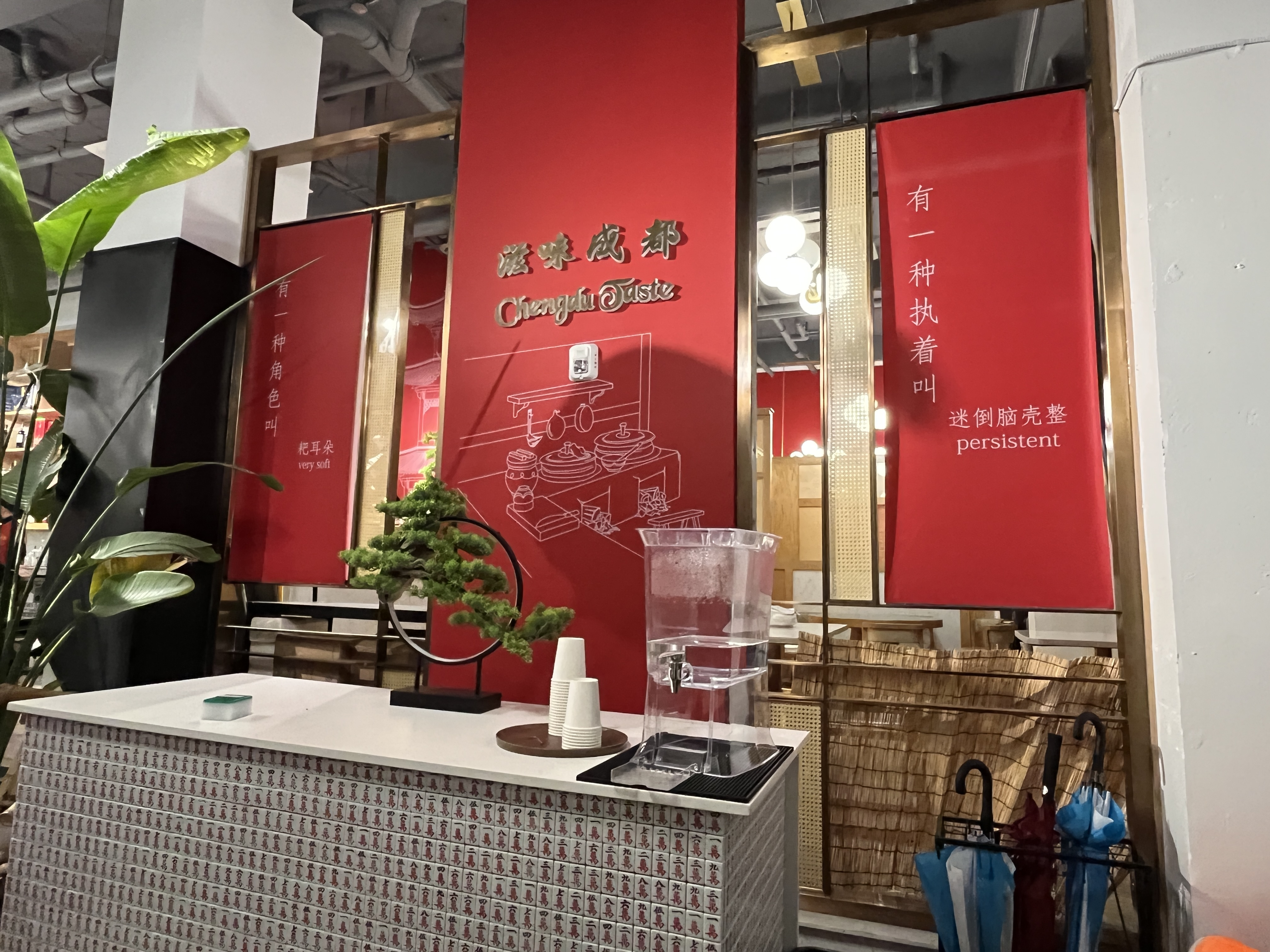
- Interior of the restaurant in Seattle, 2022

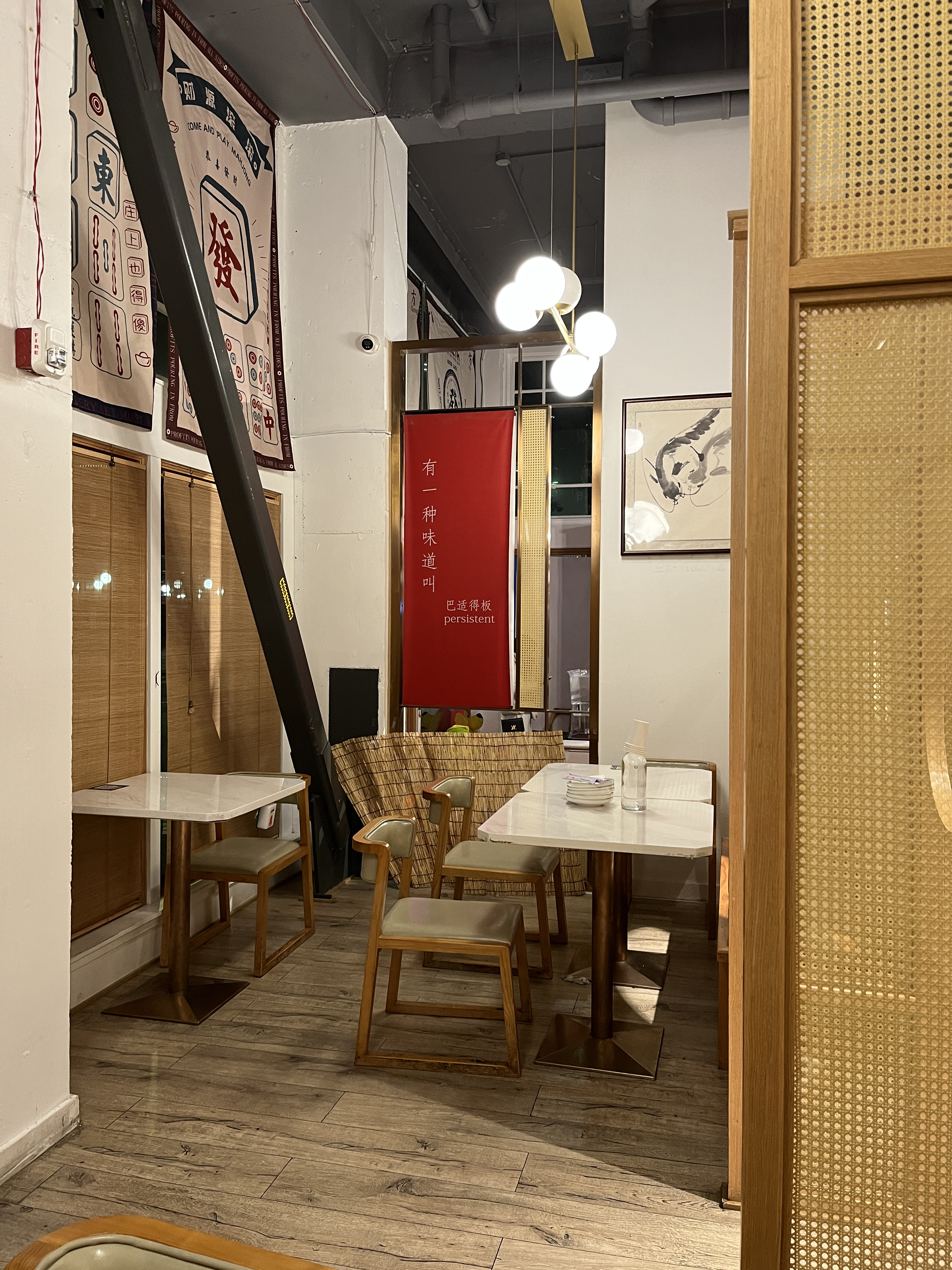
Seattle restaurant interior in 2022

Chengdu Taste (Chinese: 滋味成都) is a chain of Chinese restaurants from Southern California, in the United States. The business operates in Houston, Los Angeles, and Seattle, among other locations.

The location in the San Gabriel Valley (SGV) has been called "the crown jewel of Sichuan cuisine in the SGV". Danny Chau, writer for The Ringer, said it was his favorite Sichuan restaurant in Los Angeles. It has also been called the best Sichuan restaurant in the United States by J. Kenji López-Alt writing for Serious Eats.

== Reception ==
Chengdu Taste was included in The Infatuation's 2025 list of the 25 best restaurants in Seattle's Chinatown–International District.

== See also ==
- List of Chinese restaurants
- List of restaurant chains in the United States
