= Country Dough =

Defunct Chinese restaurant in Seattle, Washington, U.S.

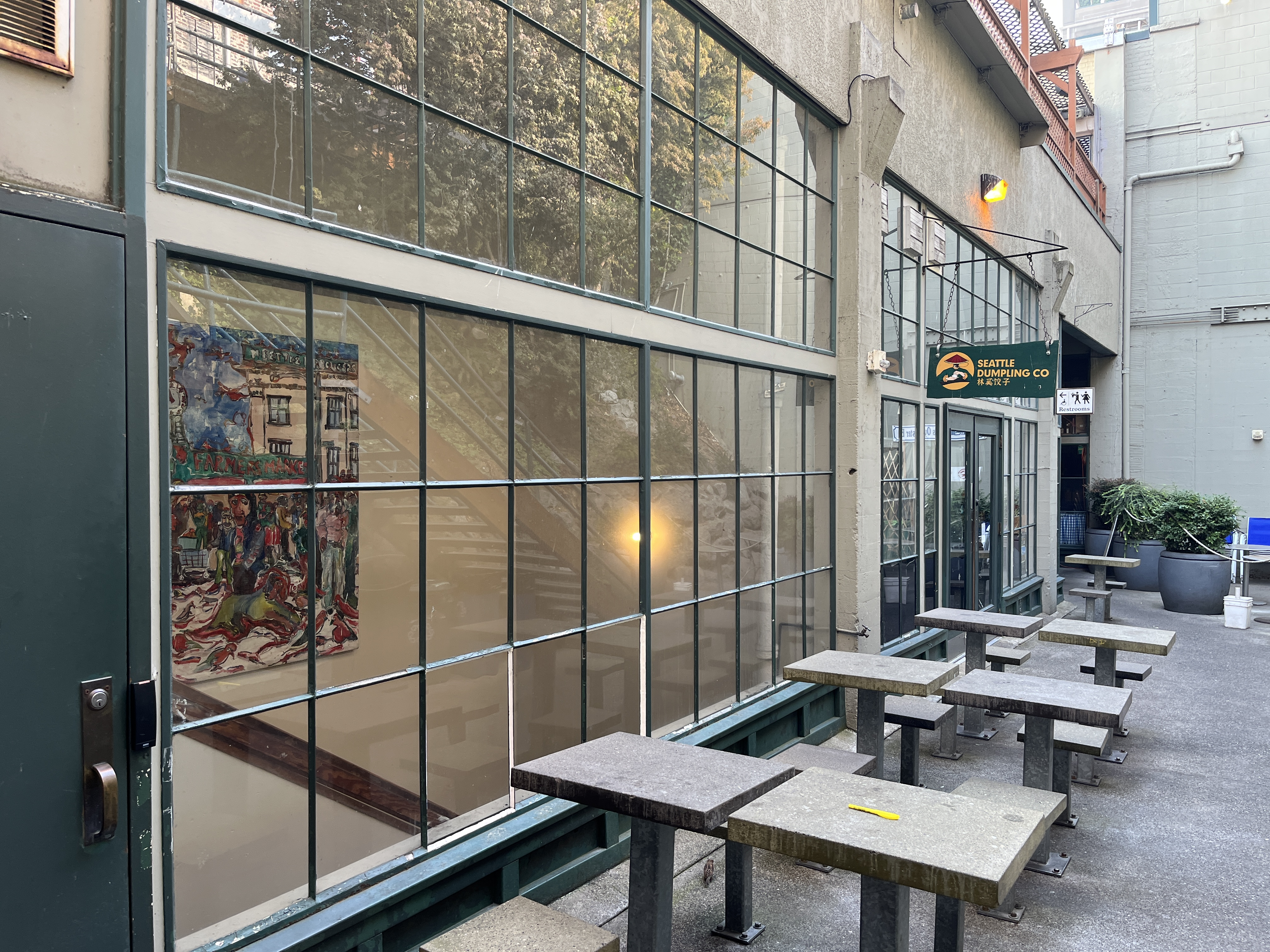
- The exterior of Country Dough after its closure in 2021
- Interactive map of Country Dough

Restaurant information
- Established: July 2015
- Closed: 2021
- Food type: Chinese
- Location: Seattle, Washington, United States
- Coordinates: 47°36′36.8″N 122°20′32.8″W

Country Dough (traditional Chinese: 鄉村饃饃; simplified Chinese: 乡村馍馍) was a Chinese restaurant at Seattle's Pike Place Market, in the U.S. state of Washington.

== Description ==
The Chinese restaurant Country Dough operated a Pike Place Market in Central Waterfront, Seattle. The menu included guokui (with beef, chicken, or pork), jianbing, and noodle dishes.

== History ==
Chef Cheng Biao Yang opened the restaurant in July 2015. In 2018, the restaurant closed temporarily for remodeling.

Country Dough closed temporarily, then permanently, during the COVID-19 pandemic. It was replaced by Seattle Dumpling Co. in 2021.

== Reception ==
In 2015, Angela Garbes of The Stranger said the flatbreads, jianbing, and noodles were all "excellent" and wrote, "I hope Yang sticks around so that locals and visitors alike will know his food, and Country Dough can become a part of Seattle history." Allecia Vermillion of the Seattle Metropolitan said, "Country Dough has turned a centuries-old labor-intensive Szechuan street snack into the perfect $5 modern day lunch."

In 2015, Julia Ochsenreiter of Eater Seattle wrote, "Just a few months into its existence, this lunchtime sensation from chef Cheng Biao Yang has turned our entire staff into Sichuanese sandwich addicts." In 2017, the website's Megan Hill said, "Tucked away in a (relatively) quiet corner of Pike Place Market, this small counter-service restaurant is the answer to your prayers if you’re searching for food amid the tourist throngs."

The Seattle Times included the business in a 2016 list of the top 20 new "cheap eats". Bradley Foster included the Szechuan Flatbread in Thrillist's 2016 list of "The Absolute Best Seattle Sandwiches for Under $7". The website's Naomi Tomky included the jianbing in a 2016 list of "The 50 Best Things to Eat and Drink at Pike Place Market".

== See also ==
- COVID-19 pandemic in Washington (state)
- History of Chinese Americans in Seattle
- Impact of the COVID-19 pandemic on the restaurant industry in the United States
- List of Chinese restaurants
- List of defunct restaurants of the United States
