= Wei Wei (restaurant) =

Restaurant in Portland, Oregon, U.S.

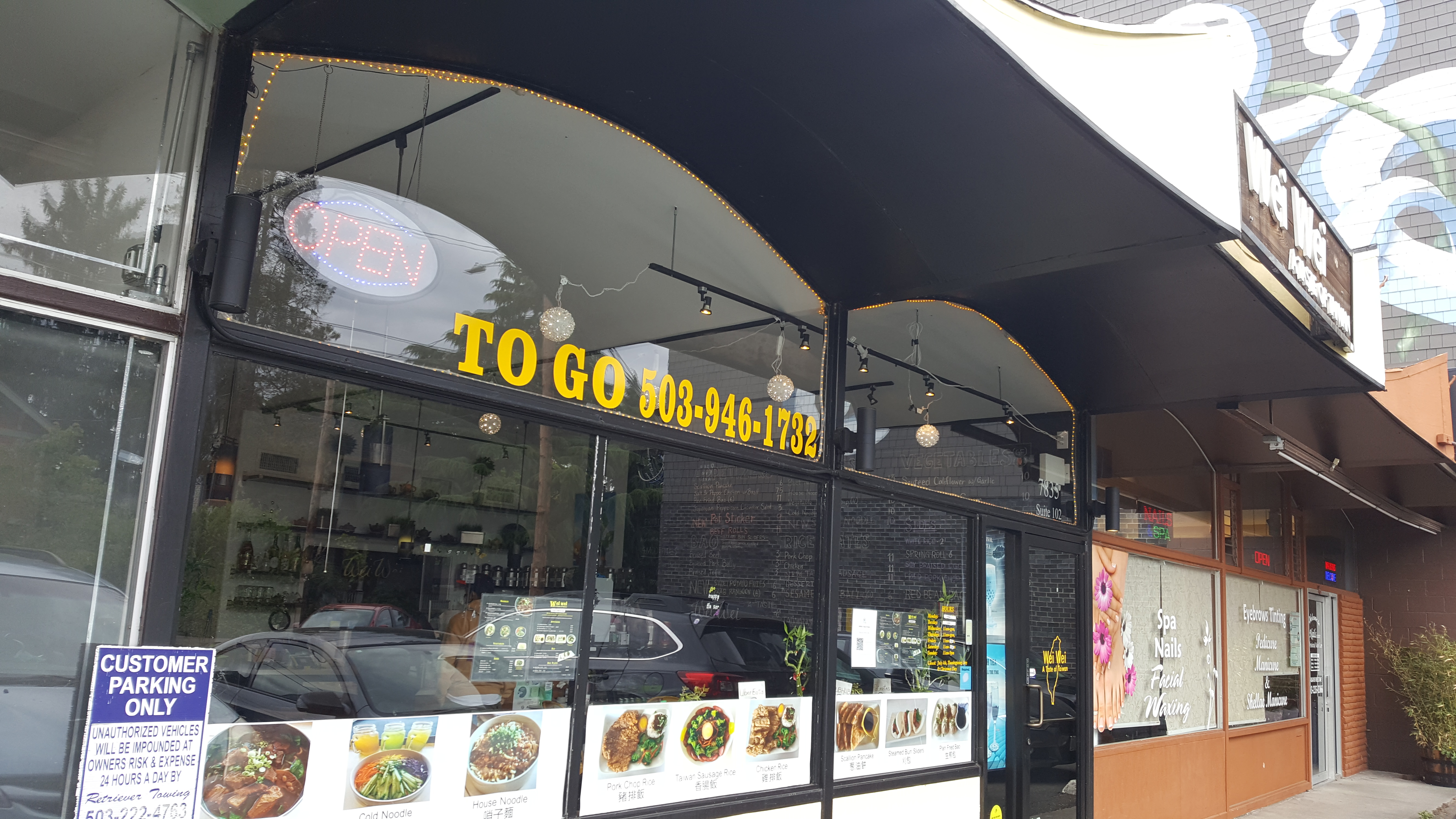
- The restaurant's exterior in 2021
- Interactive map of Wei Wei

Restaurant information
- Established: 2015
- Food type: Taiwanese; Chinese
- Location: 7835 Southeast 13th Avenue, Suite 102, Portland, Multnomah County, Oregon, United States
- Coordinates: 45.4680°N 122.6533°W

Wei Wei (sometimes subtitled "A Taste of Taiwan") is a Taiwanese restaurant in Portland, Oregon, United States.

== Description ==
The restaurant operates in a strip mall in southeast Portland's Sellwood-Moreland neighborhood.

== History ==
Wei Wei opened in 2015. In August 2018, the restaurant announced plans to close due to the owner's health. In October, Wei Wei confirmed plans to reopen under new ownership, whom Brooke Jackson-Glidden of Eater Portland described as a "longtime customer and friend" of the previous owner. The restaurant's interior and menu were generally unchanged.

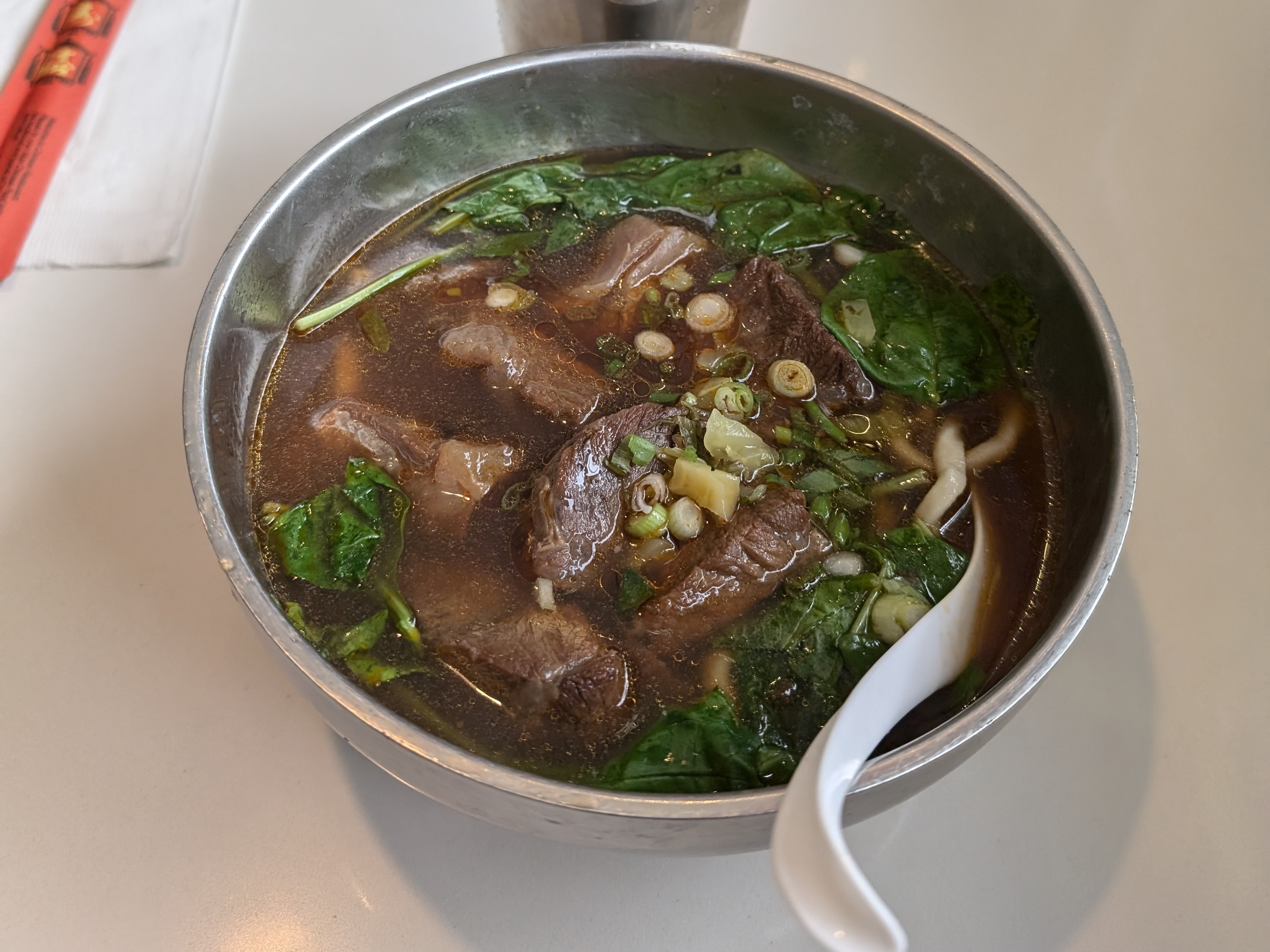
Beef noodle soup served at the restaurant

== See also ==
- List of Chinese restaurants
