= Fat Choy (restaurant) =

Restaurant in Englewood, New Jersey, U.S.

- Interactive map of Fat Choy

Restaurant information
- Established: August 2023
- Food type: Chinese
- Location: 52 East Palisade Avenue, Englewood, New Jersey, 07631, United States
- Coordinates: 40.8927°N 73.9734°W
- Website: www.fatchoyworld.com

Fat Choy is a Chinese restaurant in Englewood, New Jersey, United States. The restaurant opened in Manhattan's East Village in 2020, closed in 2022, and was reestablished in Englewood in August 2023. It was included in The New York Times's 2023 list of "The 50 places in the United States that we’re most excited about right now".

== See also ==
- List of Chinese restaurants
