= Hop Kee =

- Interactive map of Hop Kee

Restaurant information
- Established: 1968
- Owner: Peter Lee
- Food type: Cantonese
- Dress code: casual
- Location: 21 Mott Street, Manhattan, New York, 10013
- Coordinates: 40°42′52″N 73°59′56″W
- Website: www.hop-kee-nyc.com

Hop Kee is a Cantonese restaurant in Chinatown, Manhattan, opened in 1968, described as “the cornerstone of a legendary block of Mott Street.”

When restaurants in New York City were allowed to open in the early days of the COVID-19 pandemic, they were takeout and cash only.

Hop Kee appeared on Season 12, Episode 7 of Anthony Bourdain: Parts Unknown and was one of his five favorite “under the radar” NYC restaurants.

== See also ==
- List of Chinese restaurants
