= Sam Woo Restaurant =

Hong Kong-style restaurant chain

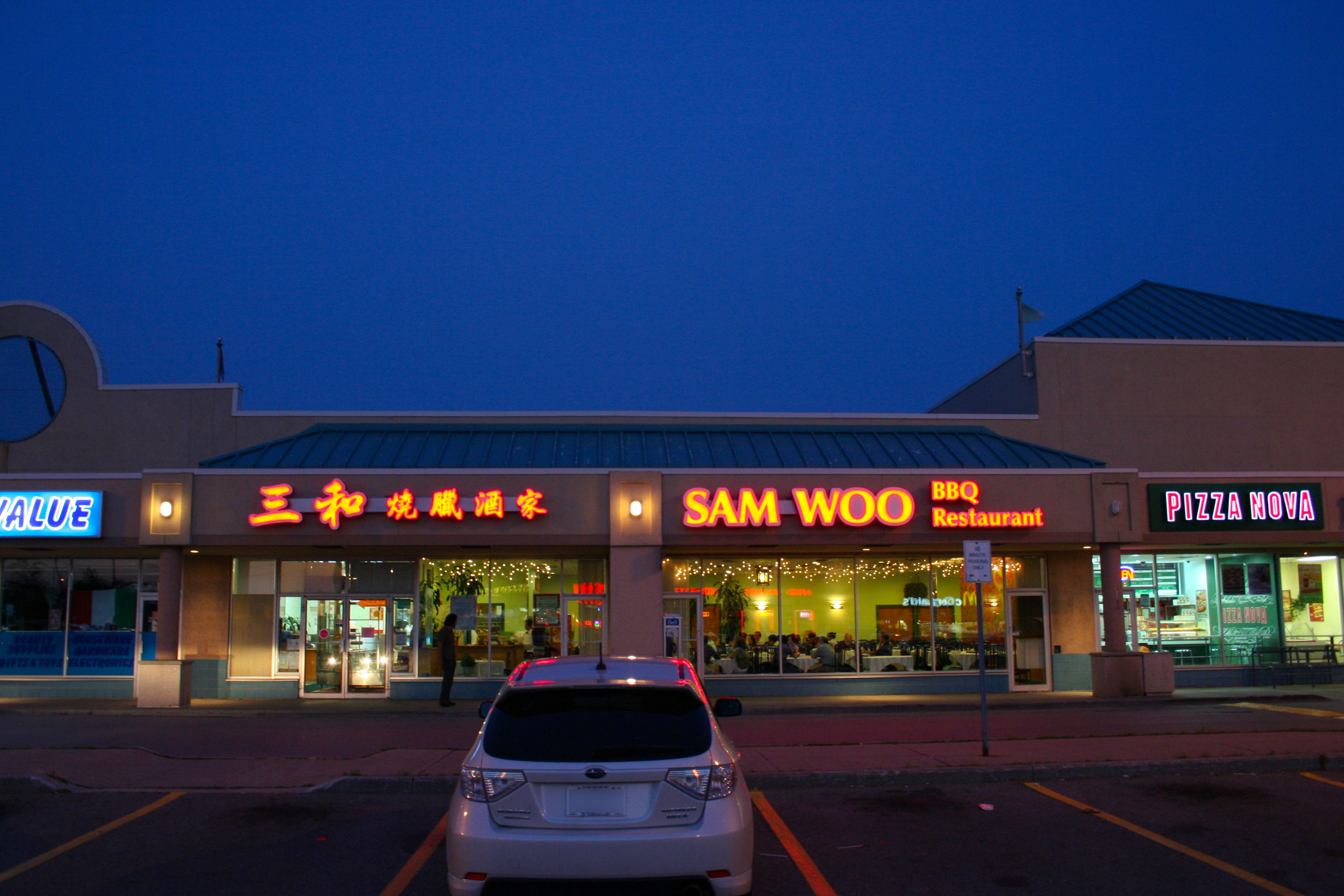
Sam Woo location in Mississauga, Ontario, Canada, which closed in February 2020.

Sam Woo Restaurant (三和) was a restaurant chain that served Hong Kong–style cuisine. It had many locations in predominantly overseas Chinese communities of Southern California, in Las Vegas, and in the suburbs of Toronto. Many of the chain's locations have closed. The complete Chinese name (三和燒臘麵家) literally means "Three Harmonies Roast Meats and Noodle House."

== History ==
The first delicatessen was opened in 1979 in the Los Angeles Chinatown. It later spread to other locations in California, including Monterey Park and Alhambra.

Two other locations in the San Gabriel Valley opened only to later change hands or close. One restaurant opened in Montebello, adjacent to where the former 99 Price Market was at, renamed to "A-1" (now closed) when an employee purchased it from the Sam Woo owners. In 2004, a Sam Woo also opened in the suburb of Covina, California, but it failed the following year.

There are two types of Sam Woo restaurants. The first is named Sam Woo BBQ Restaurant (香港三和燒臘麵家). (Note: Jyutping: hoeng1 gong2 saam1 wo4 siu1 laap6 min6 gaa1)

In 1992, presidential candidate Bill Clinton held a fundraiser at a now-defunct Sam Woo Seafood Restaurant in San Gabriel, California. In 2003, Sam Woo and other Chinese businesses in San Gabriel were affected by the SARS panic, despite lack of evidence SARS cases in the area. Customer patronage declined and the restaurant closed.

In Southern California, hoping to capitalize on the success of Sam Woo Restaurants, restaurateurs have opened imitations with similar names in English and Chinese. Examples include the long-gone Sam Doo Restaurant in San Gabriel and the current S.W. Seafood Restaurant in Irvine. In the early 1990s, a similar concept to Sam Woo Restaurant, the now-defunct Luk Yue Restaurant, also started in Los Angeles Chinatown and like Sam Woo, it expanded into the Chinese community of Monterey Park, Rowland Heights, and Cerritos.

== See also ==
- List of Chinese restaurants
- List of seafood restaurants
