= Lan Sheng =

Chinese restaurant in New York City, U.S.

- Interactive map of Lan Sheng

Restaurant information
- Food type: Chinese
- Location: 128 West 36th Street, New York City, New York, 10018, United States
- Coordinates: 40°45′5.7″N 73°59′17.9″W
- Website: lanshengnewyork.com

Lan Sheng is a Chinese restaurant in New York City. The restaurant has received a Michelin star.

== See also ==
- List of Chinese restaurants
- List of Michelin-starred restaurants in New York City
