= Yummy House Bakery =

Bakery in Seattle, Washington, U.S.

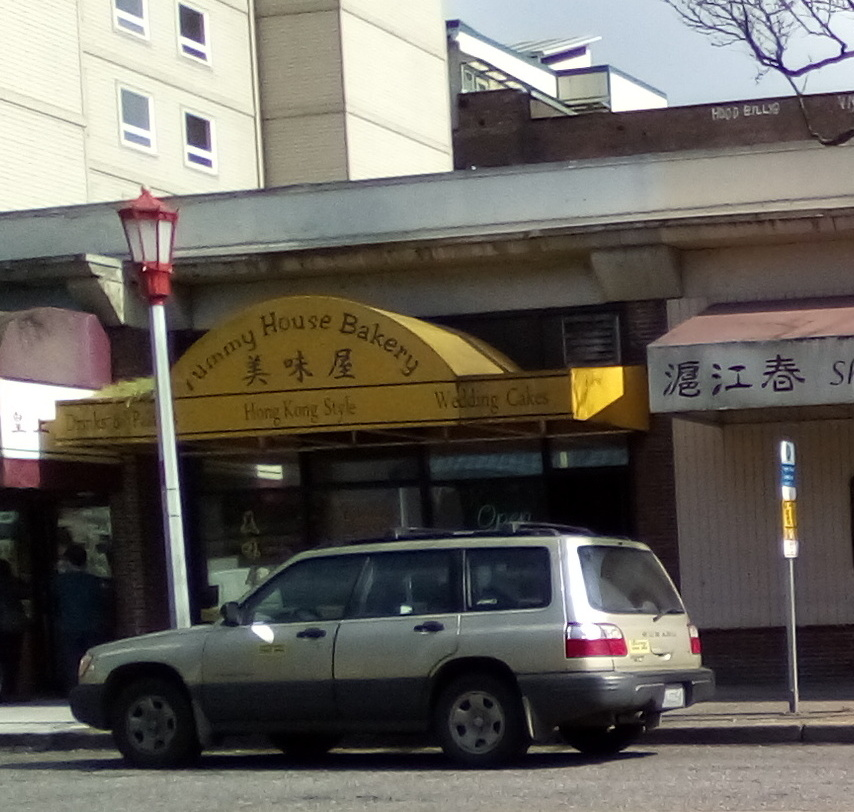
- The bakery's exterior in 2020
- Interactive map of Yummy House Bakery

Restaurant information
- Location: 522 6th Avenue S, Seattle, King, Washington, 98104, United States
- Coordinates: 47.5978°N 122.3262°W
- Website: yummyhousebakery.com

Yummy House Bakery is a Hong Kong-style bakery in Seattle, Washington, United States. The business was started by immigrants from Hong Kong in 1998.

== Description ==
Yummy House Bakery is a Hong Kong-style bakery in Seattle's Chinatown–International District (C–ID). The exterior has a yellow awning. The business operates a brick and mortar shop and in the food court of Uwajimaya. Pastries include almond cookies, coconut tarts, cream buns, and fruit cakes. The paper cupcake is sponge cake in the shape of an ice cream cone; one variety has green tea. The business also makes larger cakes, including wedding cakes. Yummy House has also served barbecue pork buns, chestnut cake, cream cheese cake, egg custard buns, sesame buns, and drinks such as bubble teas and milk teas.

== History ==
The bakery opened in 1998. The owners started the business after immigrating to the United States from Hong Kong. Yummy House claims to be one of the first bakeries in the C–ID. As of 2019, the owners' son Kavin Yoon baked and managed kitchen production. Like many restaurants, the business operated via delivery and take-out during the COVID-19 pandemic. Yummy House is a woman-owned bakery, founded by the parents of Karen Poon.

== Reception ==
Rosin Saez included Yummy House in Seattle Metropolitan's 2019 overview of seventeen "superb" international bakeries in the metropolitan area.

== See also ==
- History of Chinese Americans in Seattle
- List of bakeries
- List of Chinese restaurants
