= Shanghai Garden Restaurant =

Defunct restaurant in Seattle, Washington, U.S.

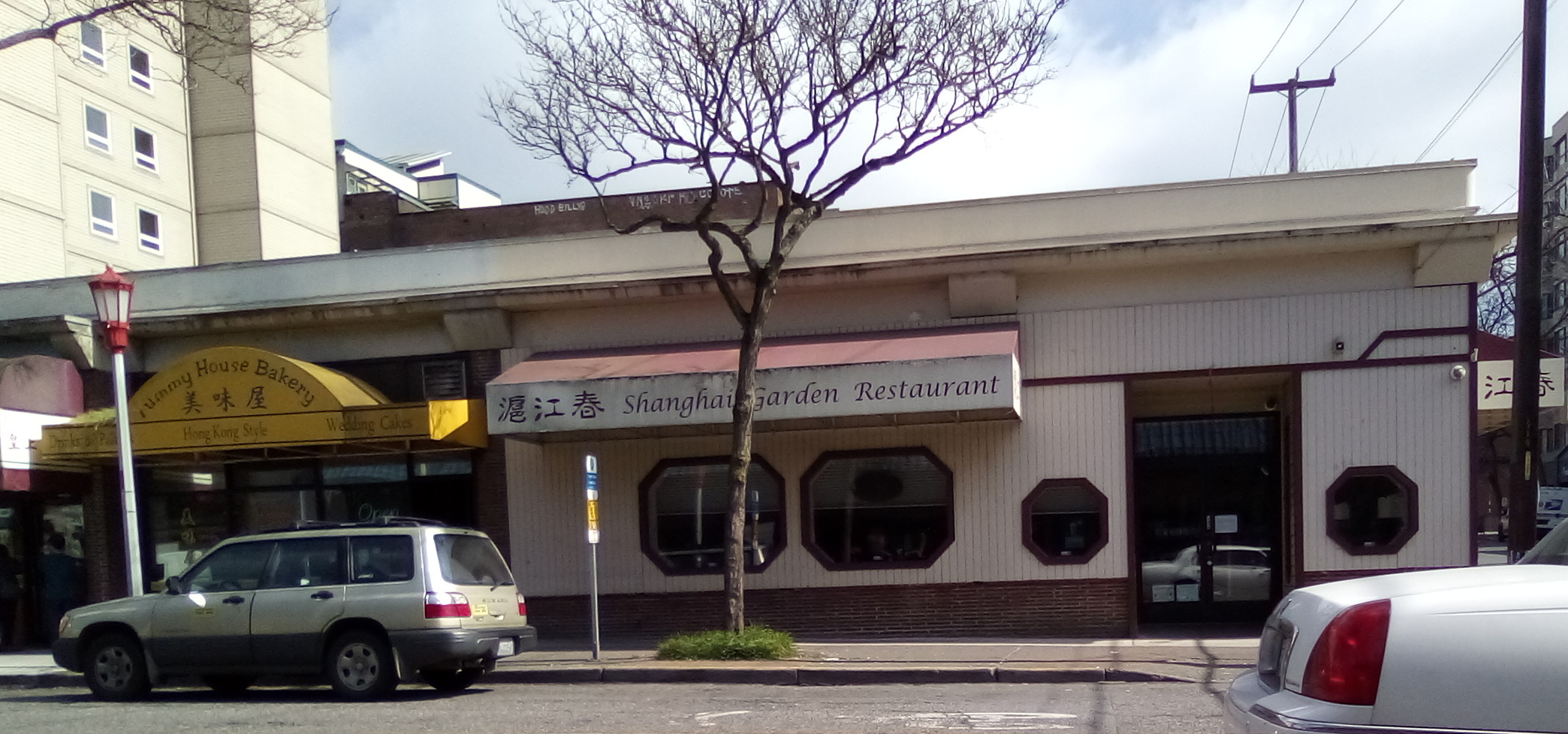
- The restaurant's exterior in 2020
- Interactive map of Shanghai Garden Restaurant

Restaurant information
- Established: 1990
- Closed: 2025
- Location: 524 6th Avenue South, Seattle, King, Washington, 98104, United States
- Coordinates: 47°35′52″N 122°19′34″W
- Website: theshanghaigarden.com

Shanghai Garden Restaurant (traditional Chinese: 滬江春; simplified Chinese: 沪江春), or simply Shanghai Garden, was a Chinese restaurant in Seattle's Chinatown–International District, in the U.S. state of Washington. Established in 1990, the restaurant closed permanently in May 2025.

== Description ==
The Chinese restaurant Shanghai Garden operated in Seattle's Chinatown–International District. The interior featured a large saltwater aquarium.

Shanghai Garden catered to a mostly Chinese clientele and served American Chinese and Shanghai cuisine. The menu included approximately 100 options, including barley noodles with spinach and beef, chicken, shrimp, or tofu. The restaurant also served black fungus, hot and sour soup, pea vines, and soup dumplings.

== History ==
Helen and chef Hua Te Su opened the restaurant in 1990. The business relocated in 1992. The couple opened a second location in Issaquah in 1996. The outpost operated for approximately one decade. Following Helen's death in 2005, four children took over the family business: Betty, Christine, Dan, and Kathy Su-Tsow.

== Reception ==
Naomi Tomky included Shanghai Garden in Seattle's Child magazine's 2016 list of seven of the best child-friendly restaurants in the city. One guide book by Moon Publications in 2019 recommended Shanghai Garden for families.

== See also ==
- List of Chinese restaurants
- List of defunct restaurants of the United States
