= Dim Sum King =

Chinese restaurant in Seattle, Washington, U.S.

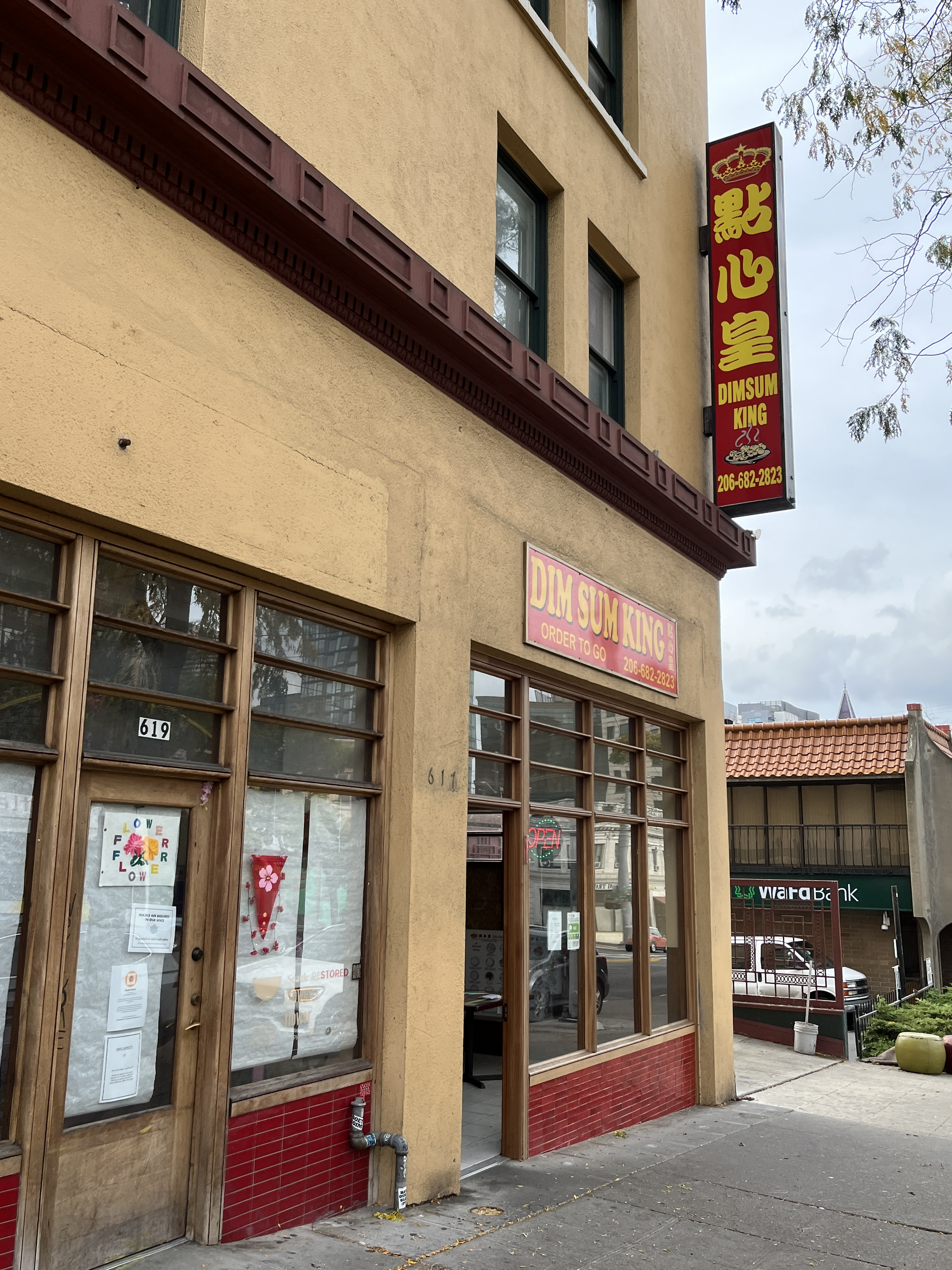
- The restaurant's exterior, 2022
- Interactive map of Dim Sum King

Restaurant information
- Food type: Chinese
- Location: 617 South Jackson Street, Seattle, Washington, 98104, United States
- Coordinates: 47°35′56.6″N 122°19′32.2″W
- Website: dimsumkingwa.com

Dim Sum King (traditional Chinese: 點心皇; simplified Chinese: 点心皇) is a Chinese restaurant in Seattle, in the U.S. state of Washington.

== Description ==
The restaurant offers dim sum a la carte; the menu has included thousand year egg congee and egg tarts. Seattle Refined's list of women-owned businesses says, "Fast service and inexpensive prices make this spot a go-to for people on the run with a craving for dumplings, buns and egg tarts."

== History ==
In 2020, the restaurant closed temporarily during the COVID-19 pandemic and was vandalized. The restaurant's exterior was painted by local artists. Additionally, a car crashed into the restaurant, injuring seven people.

== Reception ==
Leonardo David Raymundo and Ryan Lee included the restaurant in Eater Seattle's 2021 list of "14 Delightful Dim Sum Restaurants in the Seattle Area". Dum Sum King was included in The Infatuation's 2025 list of the 25 best restaurants in the Chinatown–International District.

== See also ==
- History of Chinese Americans in Seattle
- List of Chinese restaurants
