= Celeste Imperio =

Chinese restaurant in Santa Tecla, El Salvador

Coordinates: 13.6789°N 89.2704°W

Celeste Imperio is a famous Chinese restaurant in El Salvador with its central branch in Santa Tecla. It was founded in 1994 and served as one of the pillars of modern Chinese food in this small Central American country. The most attractive characteristic of this Chinese restaurant is the Chinese style façade, which resembles those of ancient Chinese palaces. To date, this is the only Chinese style façade in El Salvador. Famous dishes from this restaurant are Chow Mein, Cantonese style rice, Chop Suey and fried wantan. The flavour and style of many of the dishes were modified to suit the taste buds of Salvadorans.

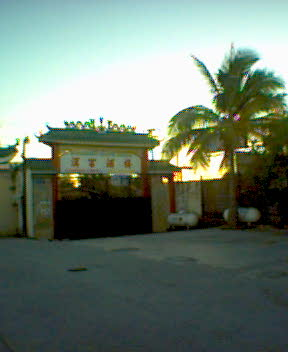
Celeste Imperio Chinese Style Facade

== Origins ==
Celeste Imperio was founded in 1994. The cooking style of Celeste Imperio is based on the Cantonese style tradition from the small town (九江) Jiujiang, Guangdong province. However, seeing the need of making Chinese food appealing to Salvadorans, the restaurant modified some of their cooking styles, naming it Chinese-Salvadoran. Although there are a few modifications, the dishes still have the distinctive taste of the Cantonese-style cooking. Many Salvadorans were attracted to the taste of this new hybrid cooking style, making Celeste Imperio their favourite spot for family dinners or lunches. In 2019, Celeste Imperio started modernizing and expanding its brand in El Salvador with nine new shops across El Salvador. Within the same year, Chinese-style sushi was introduced on the menu.

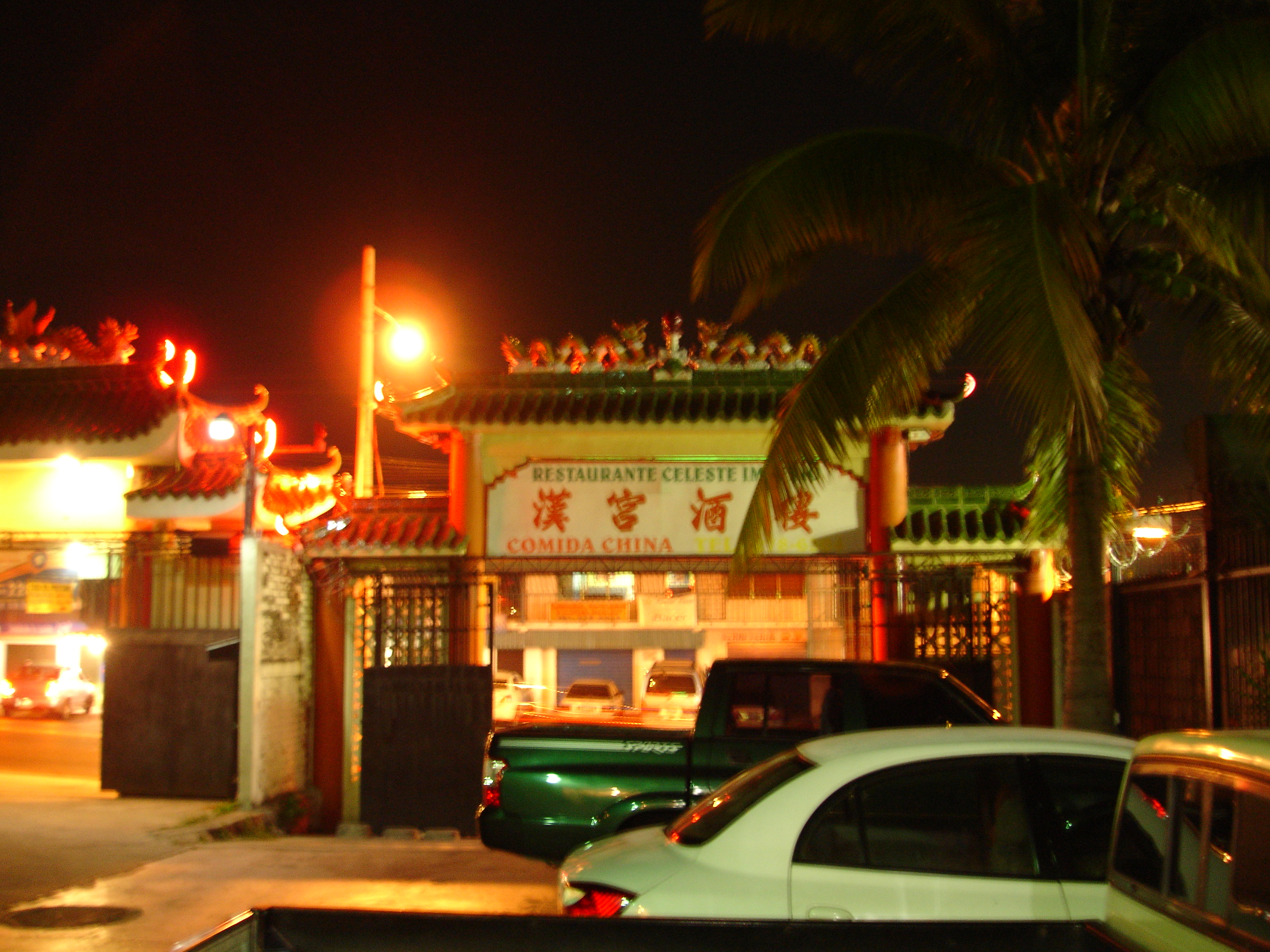
Celeste Imperio at night

== See also ==
- List of Chinese restaurants
