= Mike's Noodle House =

Chinese restaurant in Seattle, Washington, U.S.

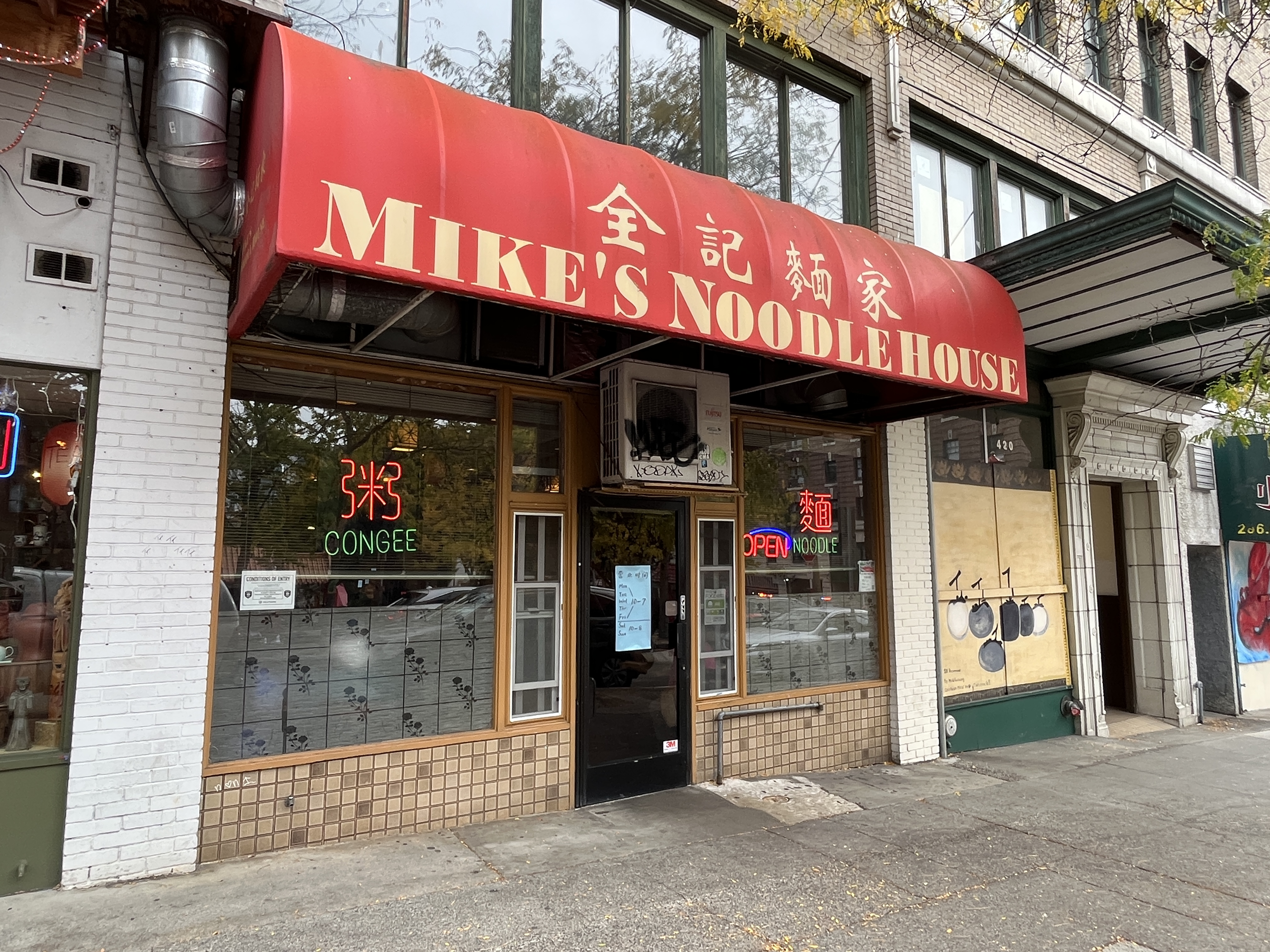
- The restaurant's exterior in 2022
- Interactive map of Mike's Noodle House

Restaurant information
- Food type: Chinese
- Location: 418 Maynard Avenue South, Seattle, Washington, 98104, United States
- Coordinates: 47°35′55″N 122°19′29.7″W
- Website: mikesnoodlehouse.site

Mike's Noodle House (traditional Chinese: 全記麵家; simplified Chinese: 全记面家) is a Chinese restaurant in Seattle, in the U.S. state of Washington.

== Description ==
Mike's Noodle House is a Chinese restaurant in Seattle's Chinatown–International District. The menu has included congee, dumplings, egg noodles, wontons, and youtiao. Congee ingredients can include beef, thousand-year egg, and fish balls. The restaurant has also served sui kau and squid ball noodle soup.

== Reception ==
In 2013, Seattle Magazine's list of "our favorite hot noodle soups" described the wonton soup with chili sauce and vinegar "perfection". Jay Friedman included Mike's in Eater Seattle's 2019 lists of "15 Essential Asian Noodle Destinations in Seattle" and "10 Top Spots for Asian Dumplings in the Seattle Area". He also included the business in 2022 lists of "20 Knockout Chinese and Taiwanese Restaurants in the Seattle Area" and "19 Knockout Restaurants in Seattle's Chinatown-International District" (C-ID). He said Mike's "gets especially crowded on weekends" and "may be the ultimate in C-ID Chinese comfort food".

== See also ==
- History of Chinese Americans in Seattle
- List of Chinese restaurants
