= Sichuan Food (restaurant) =

Coordinates: 52°21′59.32″N 4°53′25.97″E

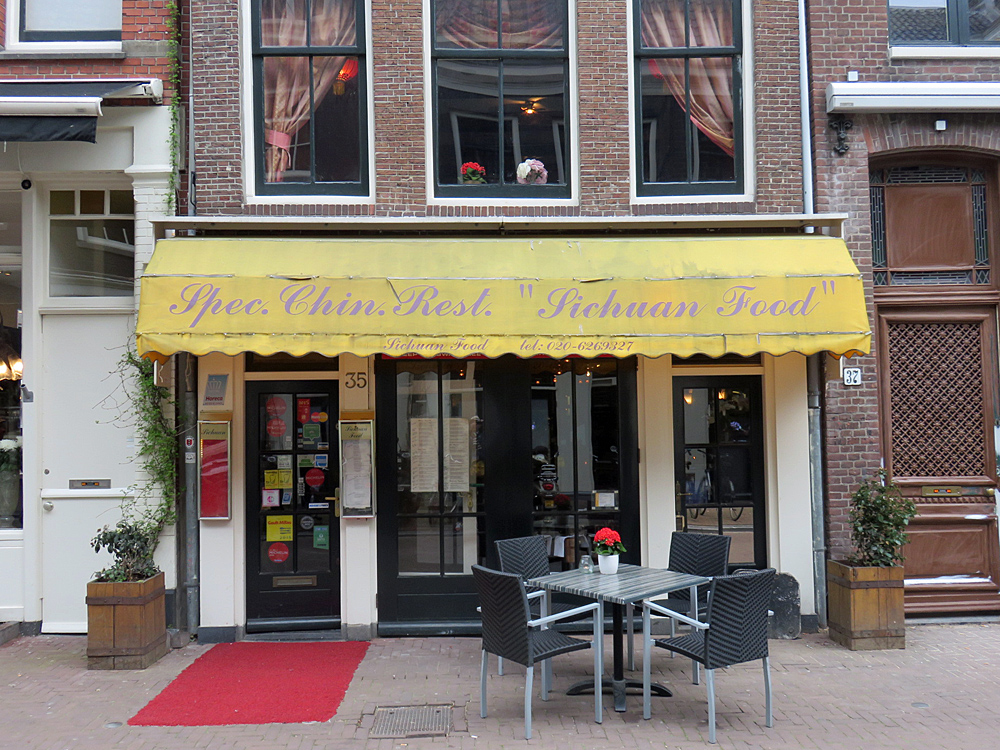
- The exterior of the restaurant
- Interactive map of Sichuan Food

Restaurant information
- Head chef: S.C. Man
- Food type: Asian, Chinese
- Location: Reguliersdwarsstraat 35, Amsterdam, 1017 BK, Netherlands
- Seating capacity: 36

Sichuan Food is a Sichuan cuisine restaurant in Amsterdam, Netherlands. It was a fine dining restaurant that was awarded one Michelin star in 1993 and retained that rating until 2005.

The Michelin star awarded in 1993 was the first one awarded to a Chinese restaurant in the Netherlands. According to Reguliers.net it was also the first Chinese restaurant in Europe to receive a Michelin star.

In 2013, Gault Millau awarded Sichuan Food 11 points out of 20.

== See also ==
- List of Chinese restaurants
- List of Michelin starred restaurants in the Netherlands
