= To Ho Panciteria Antigua =

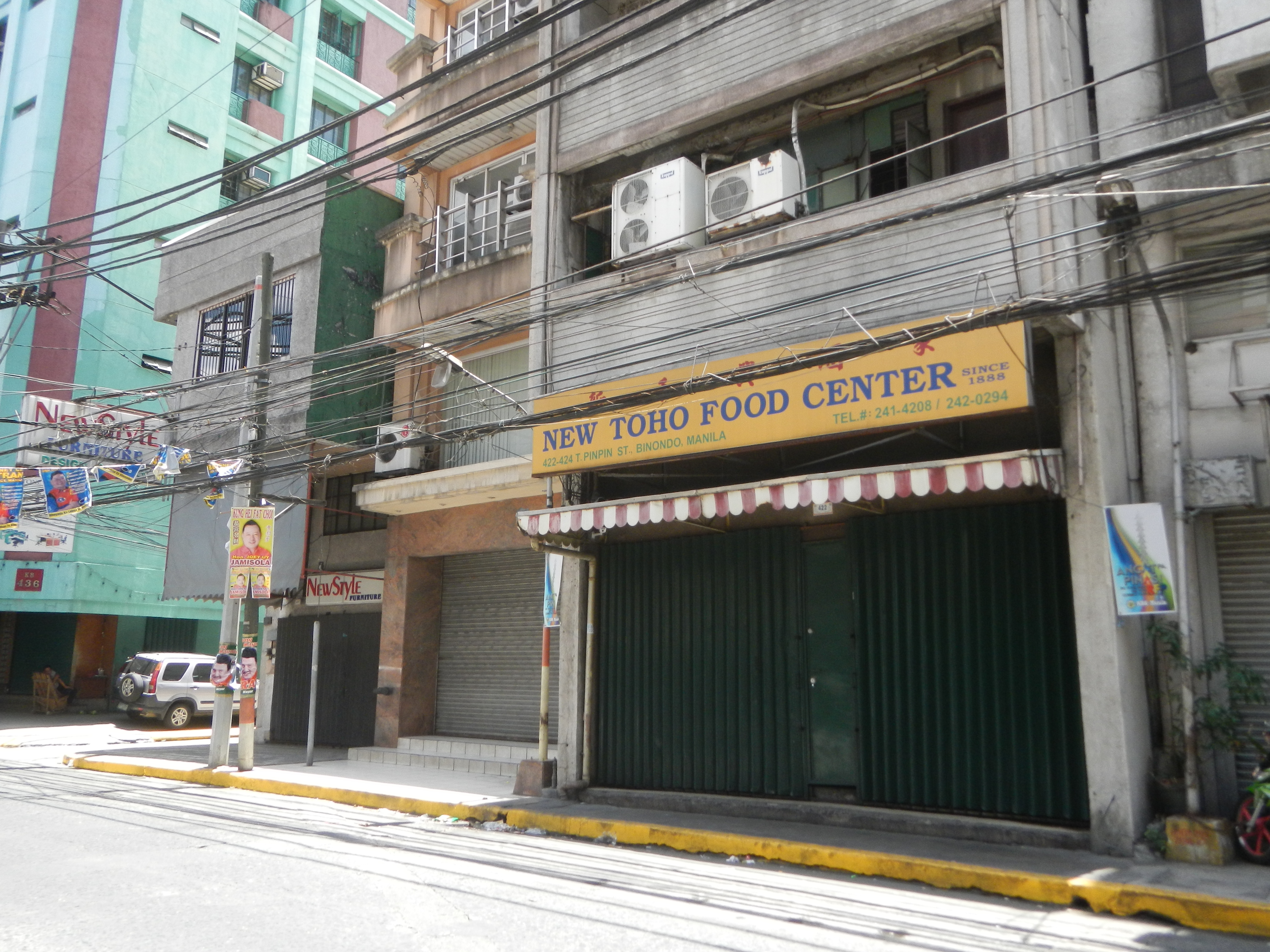
- Interactive map of To Ho Panciteria Antigua

Restaurant information
- Established: 1888
- Owner: Alvin Wong
- Food type: Chinese
- Dress code: Casual
- Location: 422–424 Tomas Pinpin St., Manila, Philippines
- Coordinates: 14°35′57″N 120°58′41″E

The To Ho Panciteria Antigua is a historic Chinese food restaurant in Manila, Philippines, established in the 19th century that claims to be the oldest in the country.

== Nomenclature ==
The name "Toho" has no specific naming according to owner Alvin Wong in 2019. Prior publications have claimed that the word came from the Hokkien term for "just right". However "just right" is in fact tuho not toho.

"Antigua" came from founder Bautista's affinity for things that have proved their value over time.

== History ==
Established sometime in the 19th century, there is a lack of verifiable information regarding the restaurant's early history. The restaurant, through its signage, markets itself as having been established in 1888, but according to The Governor-General's Kitchen: Philippine Culinary Vignettes and Period Recipes, 1521–1935 of food historian Felice Santa Maria, the restaurant was established as Antigua by Manuel "Po Kong" Bautista in 1866.

Filipino novelist and national hero José Rizal and Philippine presidents are noted to have dined in the restaurant.

The current owners have managed the restaurant for at least three generations since having acquired the restaurant, then known as the Toho Antigua Panciteria, from a group of Chinese immigrants who decided to return to China.

== Other locations ==
In January 2000, the restaurant opened its second outlet under the name Toho Restaurant Antigua in BF Homes, Parañaque, after owner Alvin Wong noticed that a significant portion of the main Binondo restaurant consisted of people from southern Metro Manila. In 2013, a third restaurant was opened in SM BF Homes. Toho except for the main branch was rebranded as Toho Antigua. As of 2019, there are four Toho Antigua outlets in southern Metro Manila.
