= Flower Drum =

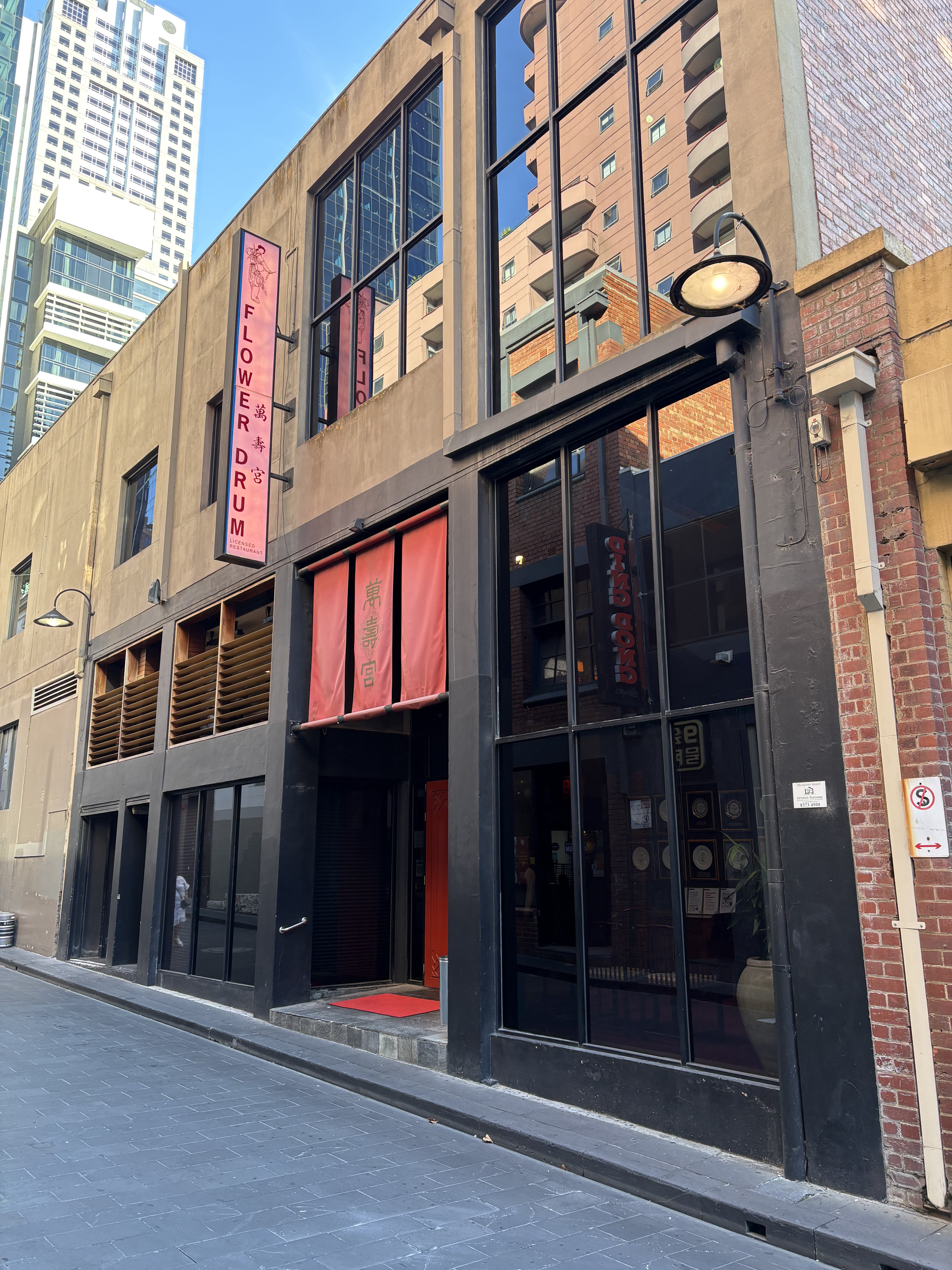
- Flower Drum in March 2025
- Interactive map of Flower Drum

Restaurant information
- Established: 26 May 1975; 51 years ago
- Owners: Anthony Lui, William Shek, Patricia Fung
- Previous owner: Gilbert Lau
- Head chef: Anthony Lui
- Food type: Chinese
- Location: 17 Market Lane, Melbourne, 3000, Australia
- Website: flowerdrum.melbourne

The Flower Drum is a Chinese restaurant in Melbourne, Australia, which is widely regarded as a Melbourne institution. It is frequently booked months in advance. It is located just off Bourke Street in Market Lane in the Chinatown precinct of the Melbourne CBD.

== Overview ==
The Flower Drum was established by Gilbert Lau and opened on 26 May 1975. The restaurant originally opened in a converted car park at 103 Little Bourke Street and took its name from the 1961 film, Flower Drum Song, a Rogers and Hammersein musical about expatriate Chinese and their life in America.

In 1980 the restaurant scoring two chef's hats in The Age's Good Food Guide's first edition. Since then the Good Food Guide has named it 'Restaurant of the Year' on numerous occasions. In 1985 the restaurant moved around the corner to its current site. In 2003 Lau sold the restaurant to his employees: executive chef Anthony Lui, William Shek and Patricia Fung.

In 2019, Anthony's son, Jason, who is now the restaurant's operational manager, has ushered the restaurant into the digital age by refreshing its menu and creating a recognisable social media presence for it.

== See also ==
- List of restaurants in Australia
