= Seattle Harbor =

Chinese restaurant in Seattle, Washington, U.S.

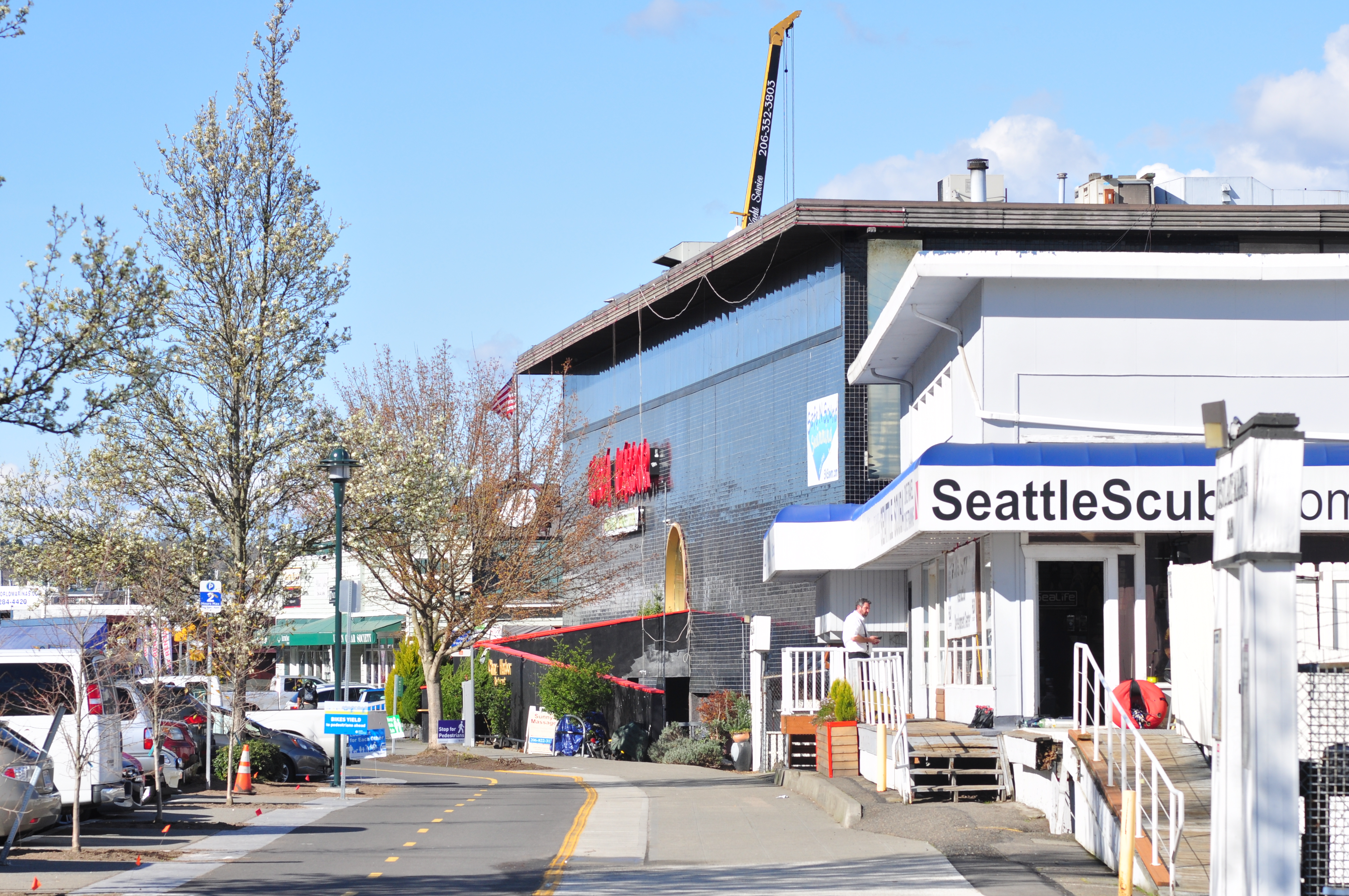
- China Harbor restaurant on the west shore of Lake Union, 2018
- Interactive map of Seattle Harbor

Restaurant information
- Food type: Chinese
- Location: Seattle, King, Washington, United States
- Coordinates: 47.6374°N 122.3399°W

Seattle Harbor (Chinese: 豪景), formerly known as China Harbor, is a Chinese restaurant in Seattle, in the U.S. state of Washington.

== Description ==
The restaurant serves dim sum.

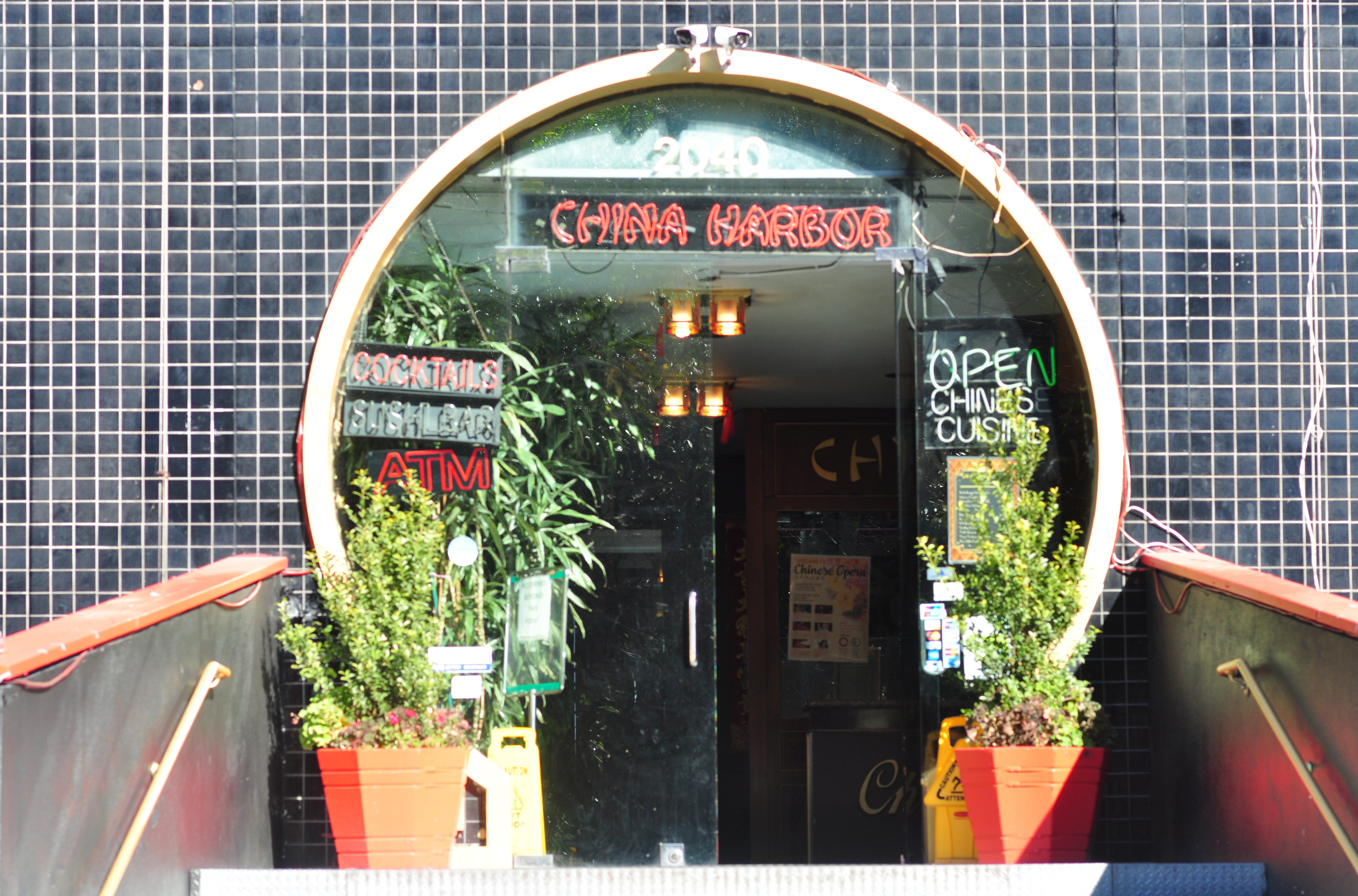
Main entrance, 2018

== See also ==
- History of Chinese Americans in Seattle
- List of Chinese restaurants
