= Szechuan Mountain House =

Restaurant in New York City, U.S.

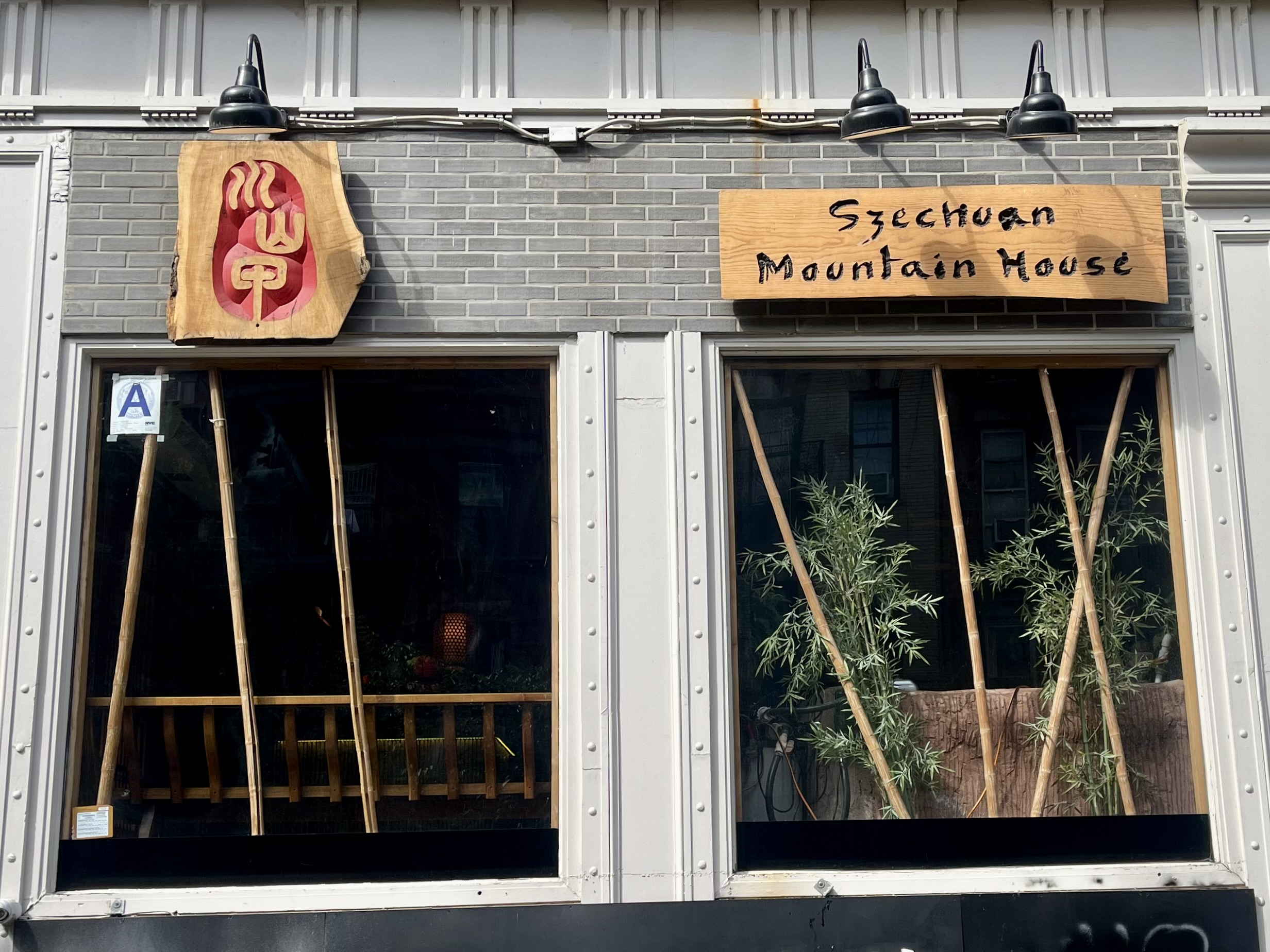
- The exterior of the East Village location in 2024
- Interactive map of Szechuan Mountain House

Restaurant information
- Established: 2016
- Food type: Chinese
- Location: 3916 Prince Street, Flushing, Queens, New York, 11354, United States
- Coordinates: 40°45′33″N 73°49′57″W
- Other locations: East Village, Manhattan; Los Angeles; Boston
- Website: www.szechuanmountainhouse.com

Szechuan Mountain House is a Chinese restaurant in New York City. It opened in Flushing, Queens in 2016; additional locations opened in Manhattan's East Village in 2017 and Los Angeles and Boston in 2023.

== See also ==
- List of Chinese restaurants
