= Republic Cafe and Ming Lounge =

Chinese restaurant and bar in Portland, Oregon, U.S.

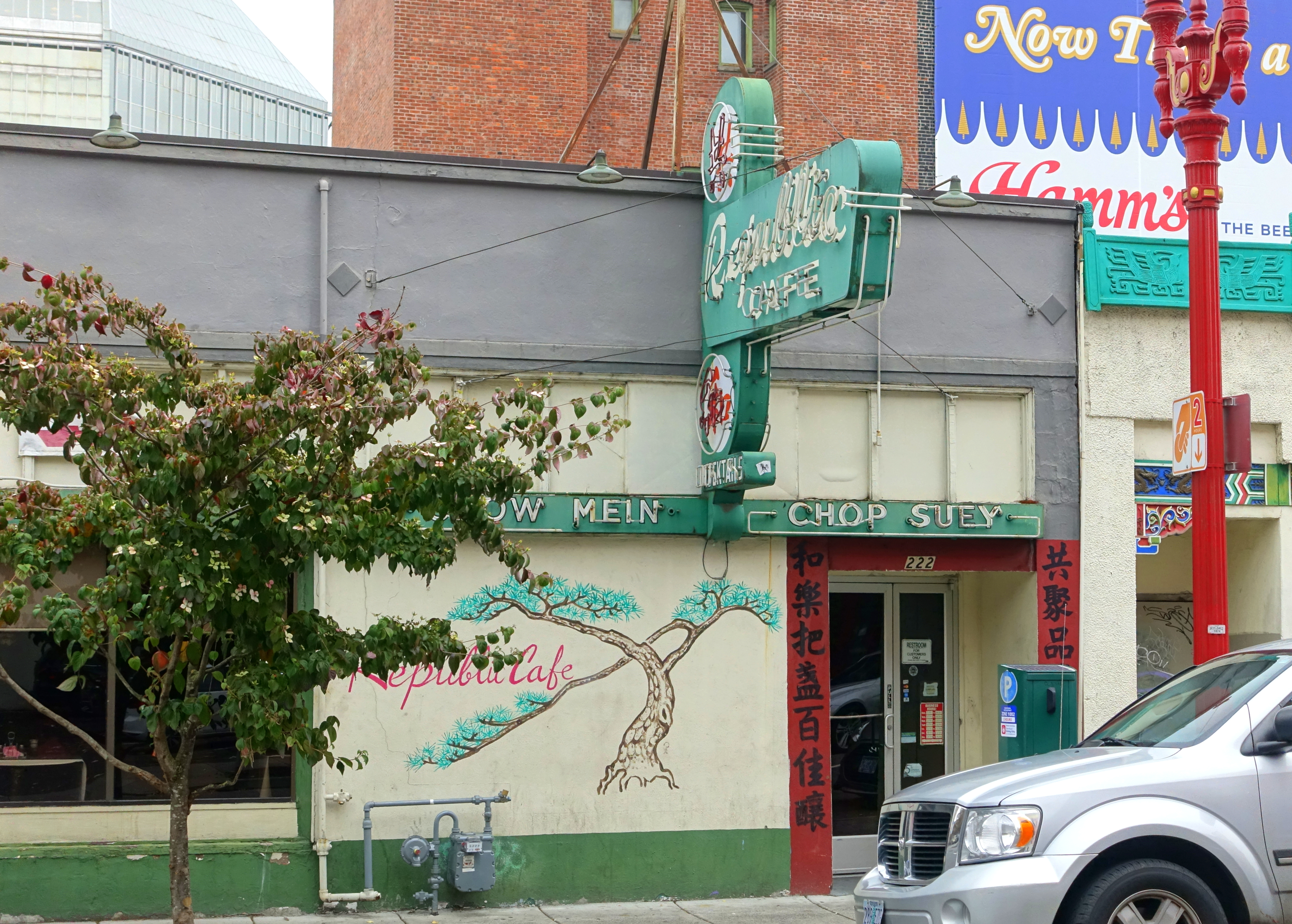
- The restaurant's entrance and neon sign, 2017
- Interactive map of Republic Cafe and Ming Lounge

Restaurant information
- Established: 1922
- Previous owners: Sam Soohoo; Victor Wong
- Food type: Chinese
- Location: 222 Northwest 4th Avenue, Portland, Multnomah, Oregon, 97209, United States
- Coordinates: 45.52496°N 122.67441°W
- Website: republiccafeor.com

The Republic Cafe and Ming Lounge is a Chinese restaurant and bar in Portland, Oregon's Old Town Chinatown, in the United States. Established in 1922, the Republic Cafe is reportedly the oldest Chinese restaurant in Portland and continues to operate under the Mui family's ownership. Serving typical American Chinese cuisine such as Mongolian beef, General Tso's chicken, chop suey, chow mein and egg foo young, the Republic Cafe has been described as a "staple" of Portland's Old Town and the city's Chinese American history. Many celebrities have patronized the restaurant which has also seen several longtime employees. Ming Lounge is among the city's oldest bars and has been characterized as "seedy".

== Description ==
The Republic Cafe and Ming Lounge is a Chinese restaurant and bar near the intersection of Northwest 4th Avenue and Everett Street in downtown Portland's Old Town Chinatown. Writing for The Oregonian, S.J. Sebellin-Ross described Republic Cafe in 2010 as "warren of a restaurant, with multiple rooms and nooks, culminating in a tight bar". Furthermore, they said of the interior, "A symphony of mood lighting and wall murals, brown vinyl banquettes and oversized wicker chairs, it wouldn't be a surprise to see Frank Sinatra nuzzling Ava Gardner over a dry martini in a dim corner booth." Matthew Korfhage of Willamette Week said the restaurant has a "cramped" dining room with floral tapestries on the walls and a mural "that looks like it was unearthed from an ancient tomb". He described Ming Lounge as a "red-lit palace of baroque Orientalism dominated by a pagoda on one wall".

Portland Monthly said of the clientele: "On the weekends, the Republic Cafe's 1950s-esque neon sign lures drunken clubbers into its midst, providing for them a cure for the drunk munchies that really hits the spot." In 2016, Eater Portland's Heather Arndt Anderson described the restaurant as the city's "reigning old timer of Old Town" with a menu "[harkening] back to the time when chop suey was the trendiest food in town". The Chinese menu has Mongolian beef, General Tso's chicken, chop suey, egg foo young, and hot and sour soup. The spring rolls, made with cabbage and celery, are served with sweet plum sauce, as are the meatless fried wontons. The shrimp and vegetables entree came with button mushrooms, cauliflower, snow peas, and water chestnuts, and the vegetable mushroom noodles came with mushrooms, onions, and snow peas.

== History ==
=== 1920s–1950s ===
The restaurant, owned by the Mui family, was established in 1922. Republic Cafe and Huber's (both Chinese-owned) are the two oldest restaurants in Portland, as of 2017. Sam Soohoo and Victor Wong were both owners of the Republic Cafe until 1979. Before selling and retiring, Soohoo had been an owner for approximately 40 years; he died in 1993. One of the Republic's cooks, Wong Hai, had his head crushed by a cleaver in the restaurant's doorway in 1942. Suspected of the "brutal" murder, Lock Poy reportedly died by suicide by hanging in a jail cell days later. Steve Woodward of The Oregonian wrote in 2004:

In the 1950s, the Republic Cafe was a magical place. The restaurant stayed open until 4 a.m. on weekends. When the nightclubs and other restaurants closed at 2:30 a.m. Friday and Saturday nights, their customers poured into the Republic. On Sundays, customers from the Jewish community would line up for a table or carryout. On Mother's Day, people would stand outside in the rain, waiting for a table. The bar used to be filled with big-name lawyers, commissioners, visiting celebrities.

=== 1960s–present ===
Woodward also opined, "Today's Republic Cafe and Ming Lounge is far different from the Republic of the 1950s. A customer no longer can leave a purse on the bar and later expect to find it still there." According to Portland Monthly, during the 1970s the bar occupied the whole banquet room and "the party often lasted until 4am. Today, however, The Republic is merely a testament to its former self." Many celebrities have visited the restaurant, including Louis Armstrong, Harry Belafonte, Victor Borge, Tommy Dorsey, Marcel Marceau, and Shaquille O'Neal. Bud Clark, a former Portland mayor, proposed to his wife at the Republic Cafe.

In 1991, the Republic Cafe agreed to hire the Chinatown Ambassadors, a group of three professional bouncers who helped "patrons of eight Chinatown restaurants get from their cars to the front doors, and vice versa, safely, without the hustle of drug dealers or panhandlers". The Oregonian's Vivien Lou Chen called the initiative "one of the most recent and innovative ways that residents and merchants have found to police themselves", but one of the men who hired the bouncers acknowledged, "the presence of the Chinatown Ambassadors has only pushed drug dealers onto other blocks, where there is less resistance". In 1992, the restaurant hosted the first joint appearance of then mayoral candidates Earl Blumenauer and Vera Katz; the forum was sponsored by the Chinese American Citizens Alliance and the Chinese Chamber of Commerce, and attended by approximately 50 people.

The Republic Cafe has had several longtime staff members. Mary Sasaki worked as a cashier, waitress, and bartender for 51 years, starting on June 5, 1953. Mary Haley was a waitress for 35 years before moving out of Portland in the early 1990s. Merridy Joy Ann Johnson served as a bartender for 25 years.

In 2010, Oregon State University described a low-cost internet surveillance system being developed by Alan Mui and partners. The concept was conceived after Mui helped his father install a low-cost security system at the restaurant. A fire started in the Republic Cafe on August 22, 2017 at 5:00 pm; there were no words regarding casualties or fatalities. In 2018, a photograph of Ivan Mui outside the restaurant was exhibited at the Portland Chinatown Museum's inaugural opening exhibit, Dean Wong's Made in Chinatown USA: Portland.

== Building ==
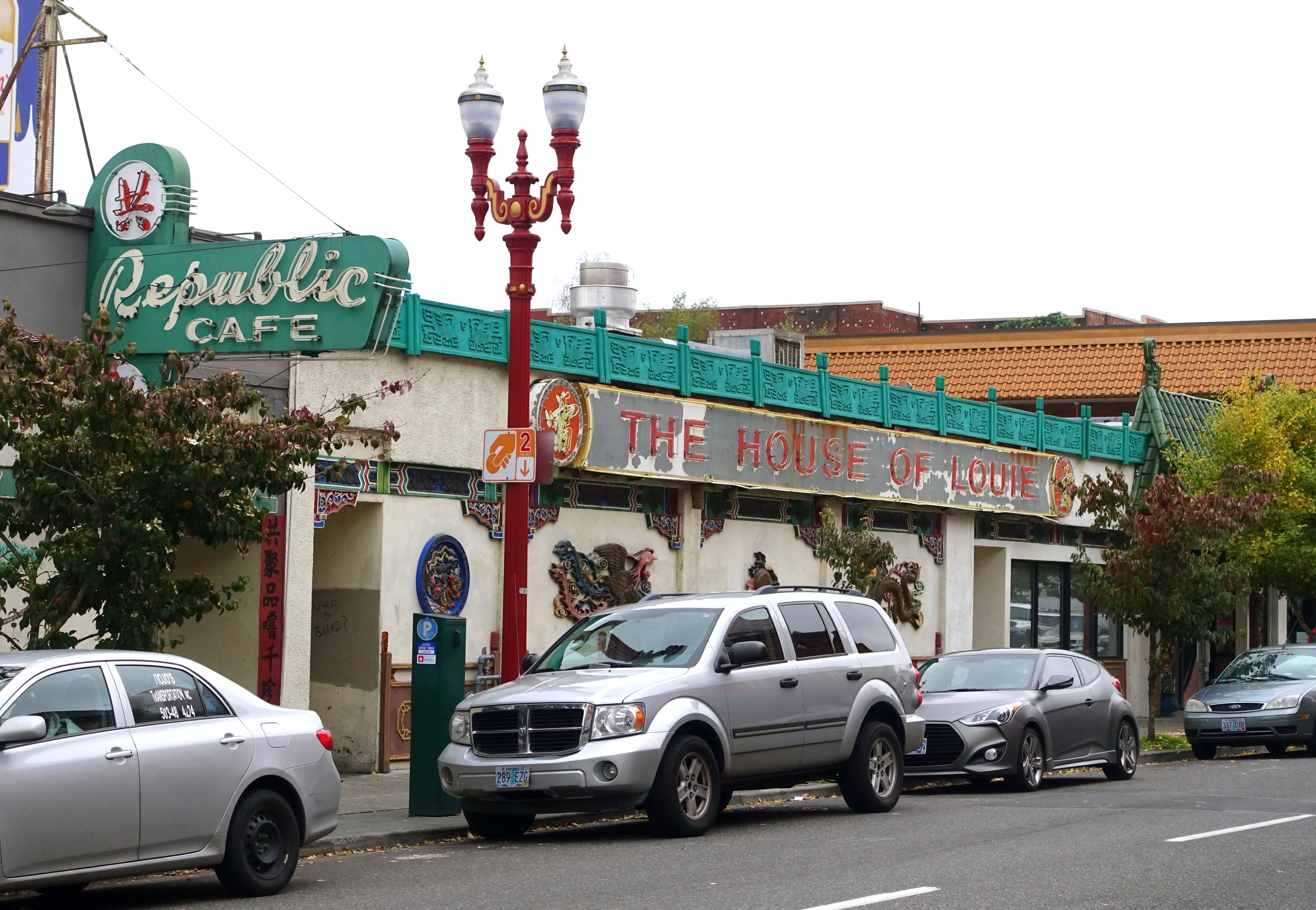
The restaurant's neon sign and neighboring restaurant House of Louie, in Old Town Chinatown, in 2017

The building occupied by the Republic Cafe was designated on the National Register of Historic Places in 1989 as part of the Portland New Chinatown–Japantown Historic District, although significant alterations to the building have limited its historical value. The architecture firm Houghtaling & Dougan designed the single-story rectangular concrete building for O.B. Stubbs. The Zanella Brothers completed the structure in 1922 for $15,000. The Stubbs family owned the building until Sally Friedman bought it in 1945. Chinese and Japanese businesses such as barbershops and restaurants operated in the storefronts. The building has a concrete foundation, stucco exterior, and a flat roof with green tile covers. The entrance and exterior were remodeled in 1960 and 1974, respectively. According to the historic district's registration form, Republic Cafe opened in the building in 1930.

== Reception ==
Portland Monthly has called the restaurant "a Chinatown staple" with "cheap and greasy" food and said the lounge "provides little in the way of the wild 70s, and the seedy atmosphere and red & gold orientalia decor recalls those halcyon days when Chinatown actually housed a significant Chinese population". In 2010, The Oregonian's Sebellin-Ross called the meatless fried wontons "embarrassingly addictive", recommended the shrimp with vegetables, and wrote, "while the vegetable mushroom noodles are not overwhelmingly tasty, the sheer quantity" of food is "perfect for a big appetite with a small budget". In Linh Dinh's Postcards from the End of America (2017), which sees the author travel by bus and train "to document what life is like in the parts of America that don't always make the headlines", Dinh visit the Plaza Blocks and Ming Lounge. His conclusion for the chapter "Squirrelly Portland" is "It's not all roses here." In 2017, Willamette Week's Matthew Korfhage called Ming Lounge "the most beautiful seedy bar" in the city and said the Republic is "perhaps, the only place in Portland where chop suey and egg foo young are still considered delicacies". He reckoned:

Sure, the place has seen better days (on our visit, the door had been smashed in, and covered with particle board) but almost nowhere in Portland is the distant past so present. The egg foo young is like an old man's heart—full of egg and gravy. You couldn't call it good, but it is a profound comfort. The hot-and-sour soup and General Tso's chicken can be safely ignored, but the Republic serves the most classic rendition of Mongolian beef in Portland, a massive platter that is all green onion bittersweetness and cellophane crunch, under strips of beef.

Additionally, in his 2017 Old Town pub crawl "for people who rarely use the word 'bro'", Korfhage wrote:

One of the oldest bars in Portland, the red-walled Ming Lounge is also perhaps one of its most obscure—tucked alongside an equally old Chinatown eatery. But aside from the occasional shouting tweaker, Ming Lounge is amazing: deco walls, the stiffest $4 well drinks anywhere in town, and surprisingly good Chinese that includes a multi-item egg foo young menu that seems to be directly transported from the 1940s. Turns out, it's delicious when you're drunk late at night—which is when you're here.

== See also ==
- History of Chinese Americans in Portland, Oregon
- List of Chinese restaurants
