= Portland New Chinatown/Japantown Historic District =

Historic district in Portland, Oregon, U.S.

- U.S. National Register of Historic Places
- U.S. Historic district
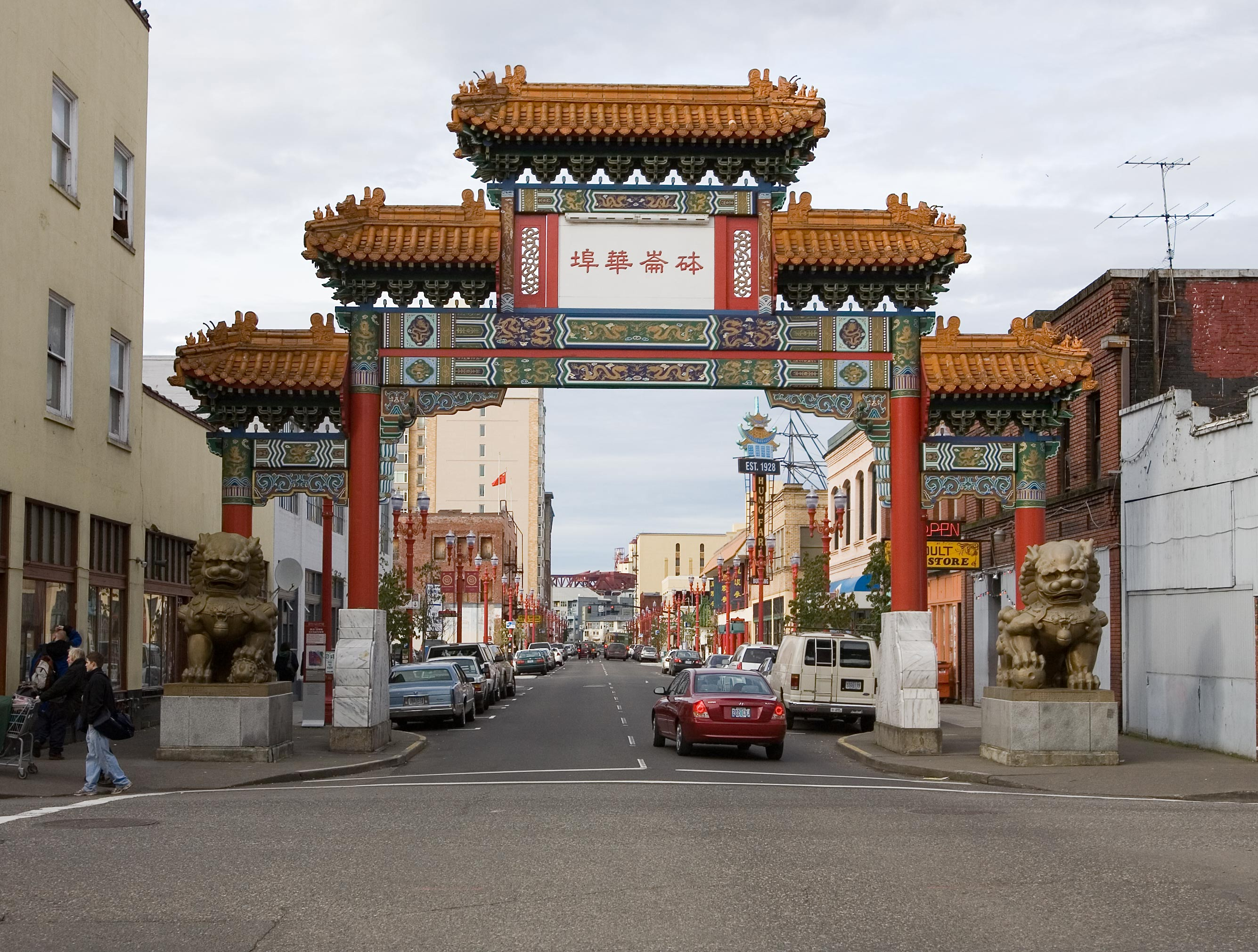
- Chinatown Gateway over NW Fourth Avenue at W Burnside Street
- Location: Portland, Oregon
- Area: 174 acres (70 ha)
- Built: Apx. 1880-1927
- Architect: multiple
- Architectural style: Late Victorian, Modern Movement, Late 19th And Early 20th Century American Movements
- NRHP reference No.: 89001957
- Added to NRHP: November 21, 1989

The Portland New Chinatown/Japantown Historic District is a historic district in Portland, Oregon's Old Town Chinatown neighborhood, in the United States. The district is listed on the National Register of Historic Places.

== Description ==
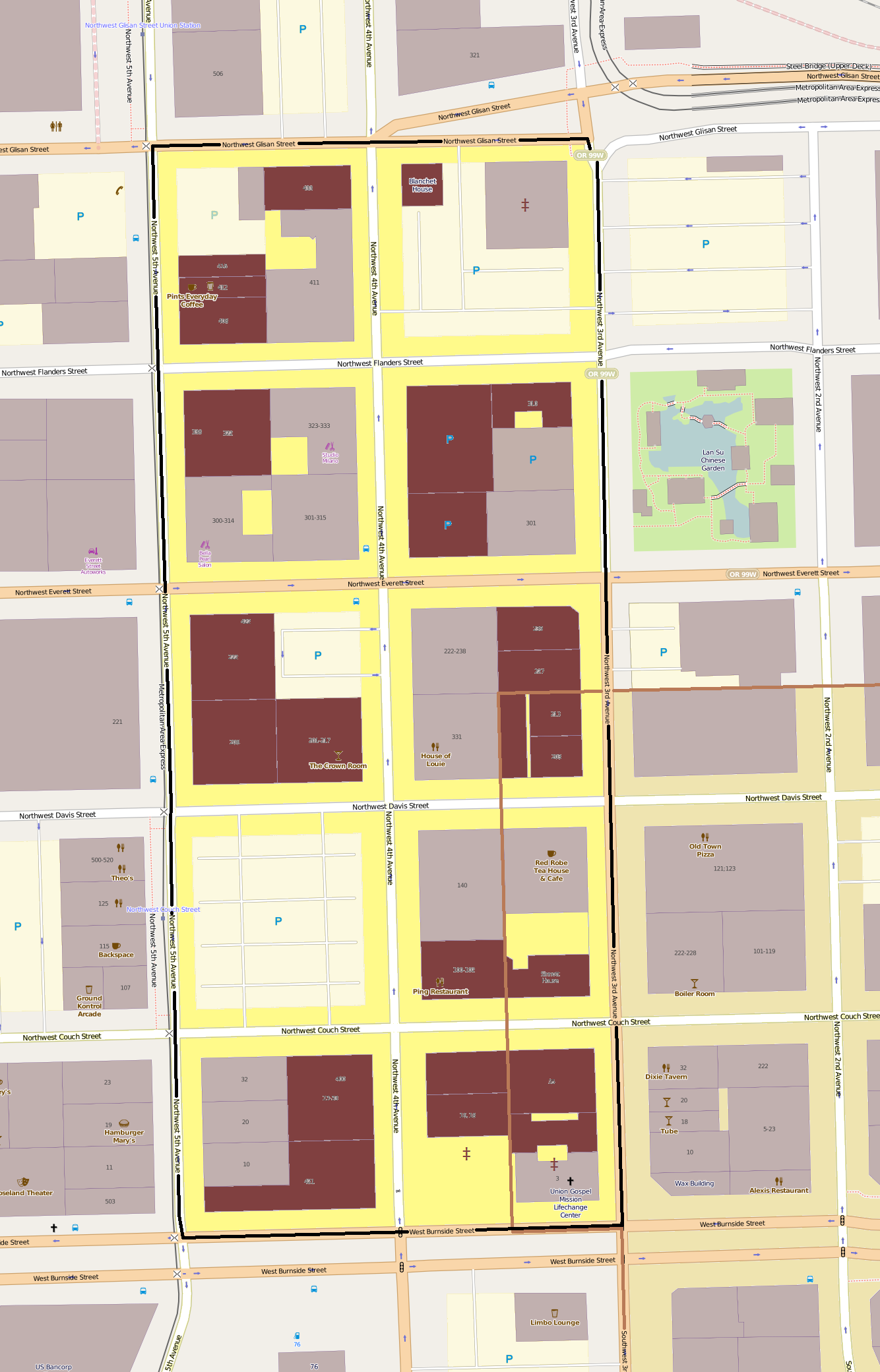
Map

Structures include:

1. Dirty Duck Tavern
2. Blanchet House (340 NW Glisan)
3. Royal Palm Hotel
4. Portland Fish Co. (317 NW 3rd Avenue)
5. Portland Fish Co. (301-313 NW 3rd Avenue)
6. Portland Fish Co. (300-312 NW 4th Avenue)
7. Portland Fish Co. (316-322 NW 4th Avenue)
8. Portland Fish Co., historically known as Carl's Garage (328-336 NW 4th Avenue)
9. Great Era, historically known as Pallay Building (231-239 NW 3rd Avenue)
10. Wong's Laundry, historically known as Pallay Building (221-223 NW 3rd Avenue)
11. Hip Sing Association, historically known as Portland Seamen's Bethel (211-215 NW 3rd Avenue)
12. The Society Hotel, historically known as Portland Seamen's Bethel (203-209 NW 3rd Avenue)
13. Chinese Consolidated Benevolent Association (315 NW Davis)
14. House of Louie
15. Republic Cafe & Wok Express (222-238 NW 4th Avenue)
16. Kida Company (127 NW 3rd Avenue)
17. Simon Facade & Parking Lot, historically known as Simon Building (107 NW 3rd Avenue)
18. Couch Street Fish House, historically known as Sinnot House (103-105 NW 3rd Avenue)
19. Hung Far Low (102-112 NW 4th Avenue)
20. Tuck Lung Grocery & Restaurant (140 NW 4th Avenue)
21. Ciclo Bicycle Shop (21 NW 3rd Avenue)
22. Mission Hotel & Chapel, historically known as Meriweather Hotel (11-17 NW 3rd Avenue)
23. Hotel Villa (7-9 NW 3rd Avenue)
24. Saigon Express, historically known as Neppach Hotel (1-3 NW 3rd Avenue)
25. Cindy's (319-337 W. Burnside St)
26. Cindy's (8 NW 4th Avenue)
27. Tung Sang, historically known as Pulos-Karabelas Saloon (18-24 NW 4th Avenue)
28. Suzie Wong Restaurant (28 NW 4th Avenue)
29. Chinatown Gateway (NW 3rd and W Burnside)
30. Goldsmith Company (33 NW 4th Avenue)
31. Grove Hotel, historically known as Philip Hotel (401-439 W. Burnside and 11 NW 4th Avenue)
32. Goldsmith Company (10-14 NW 5th Avenue)
33. Goldsmith Company, historically known as Fithian-Barker Shoe Co. (20 NW 5th Avenue)
34. Design Linens (32 NW 5th Avenue)
35. Jack's Chinatown Parking Lot (Between NW 4th and NW 5th, NW Couch and NW Davis)
36. SW Corner NW 4th and Everett
37. Suey Sing Association, historically known as Overland Warehouse Co. (201-217 NW 4th Avenue)
38. Kalberer Company, historically known as Zellerbach Paper Co. (208 NW 5th Avenue)
39. Kalberer Company, historically known as Mason-Ehrman Co. (234 NW 5th Avenue)
40. SW corner of NW 4th and Flanders Streets
41. Fong Chong Grocery & Restaurant (301 NW 4th Avenue)
42. Empire Uniform Co., historically known as Foster & Kleiser (310 NW 5th Avenue)
43. Portland Fixture Co. (338 NW 5th Avenue)
44. Columbia River Ship Supply (406 NW Glisan Street)
45. Pro-Bind (431 NW 4th Avenue)
46. Anderson Oregon Rental (401-419 NW Flanders Street)
47. Bloch & Son, historically known as Povey Building (408 NW 5th Avenue)
48. Haradon Building (412 NW 5th Avenue)
49. Aikido, historically known as Harper Brass Works Co. (416 NW 5th Avenue)
50. 430 NW 5th Avenue

== See also ==
- National Register of Historic Places listings in Northwest Portland, Oregon
