= Old Town Chinatown =

- Neighborhood
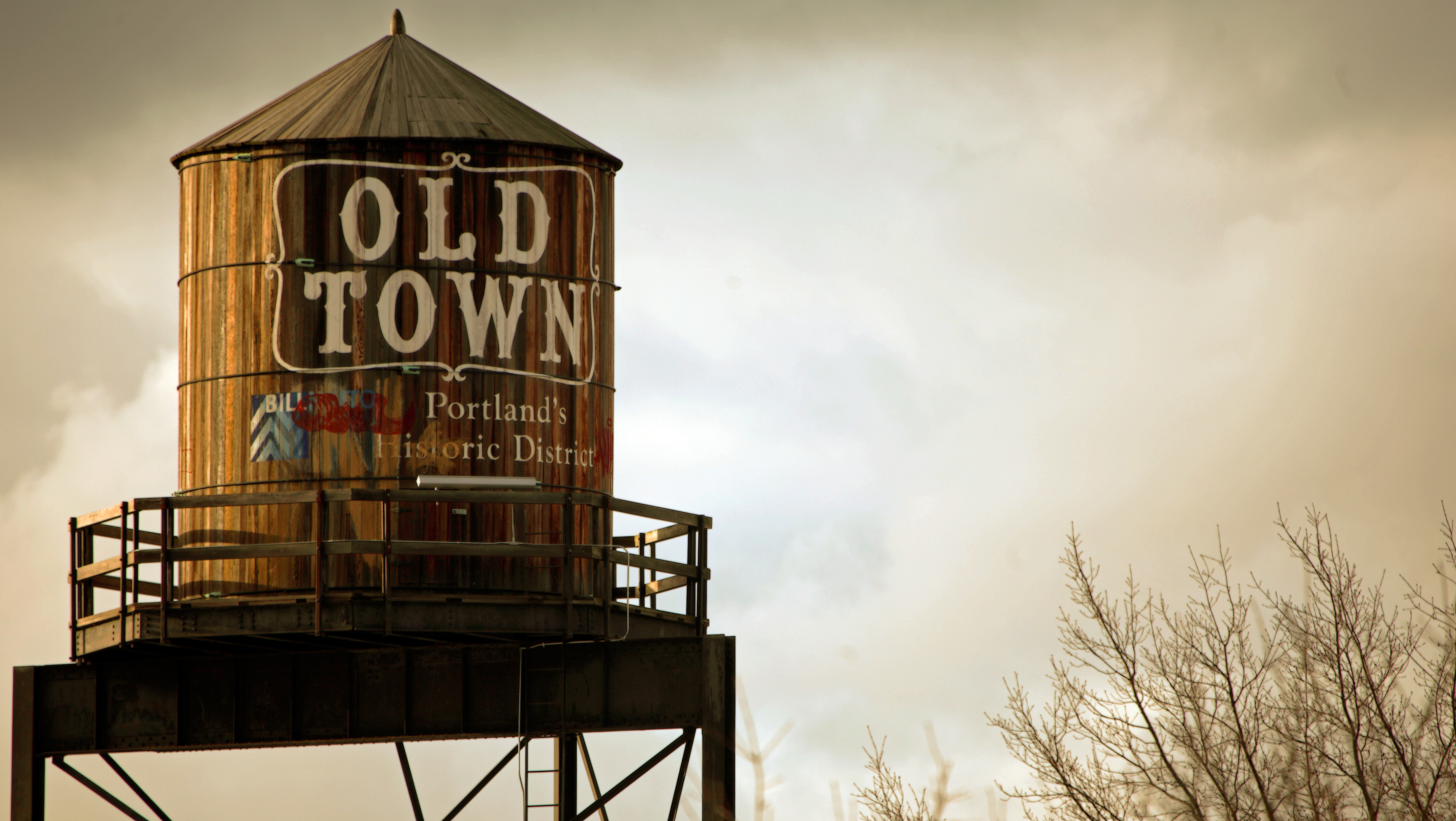
- Location in Portland
- Coordinates: 45°31′31″N 122°40′21″W
- Country: United States
- State: Oregon
- City: Portland

Government
  - Association: Old Town Chinatown Neighborhood Association

Area
  - Total: 0.20 sq mi (0.53 km^{2})

Population
  - Total: 3,922
  - Density: 19,000/sq mi (7,400/km^{2})

Old Town Chinatown is the official Chinatown of the northwest section of Portland, Oregon, United States. The Willamette River forms its eastern boundary, separating it from the Lloyd District and the Kerns and Buckman neighborhoods. It includes the Portland Skidmore/Old Town Historic District and the Portland New Chinatown/Japantown Historic District, which are listed on the National Register of Historic Places. It has been referred to as the "skid row" of Portland.

== Description ==
In the northwest section, Broadway forms the western boundary, separating it from the Pearl District, and West Burnside Street forms the southern boundary, separating it from Downtown Portland. In the southwest section, the neighborhood extends from 3rd Avenue east to the river and from Stark Street north to West Burnside Street (with the exception of areas south of Pine Street and west of 2nd Avenue, and south of Oak Street and west of 1st Avenue, which are part of the downtown area).

Despite the name, most Chinese-Americans and Chinese immigrants had already moved out of the area by the time the city reworked it as an official Chinatown in the 1980s; the increase in property values after the renovations drove out many of the remaining Chinese immigrants, with a section of Northeast 82nd Avenue in East Portland becoming the new unofficial Chinatown. Old Town is well known as the primary homeless district of Portland. The Oregonian reported that homelessness, open drug use, crime, and the perception of danger and dirtiness that accompanies these problems were deterring factors to development. One prominent developer told the newspaper that "transient activity" is "perhaps the foremost deterrent" to developing in this neighborhood. Many homeless services providers are clustered in this neighborhood.

Public art in the neighborhood have included Cairns, Chinatown Gateway, Driver's Seat, Festival Lanterns, Friendship Circle, Nepenthes, the Packy mural, Sculpture Stage, Skidmore Fountain, and The Green Man of Portland.

=== Architecture and business ===
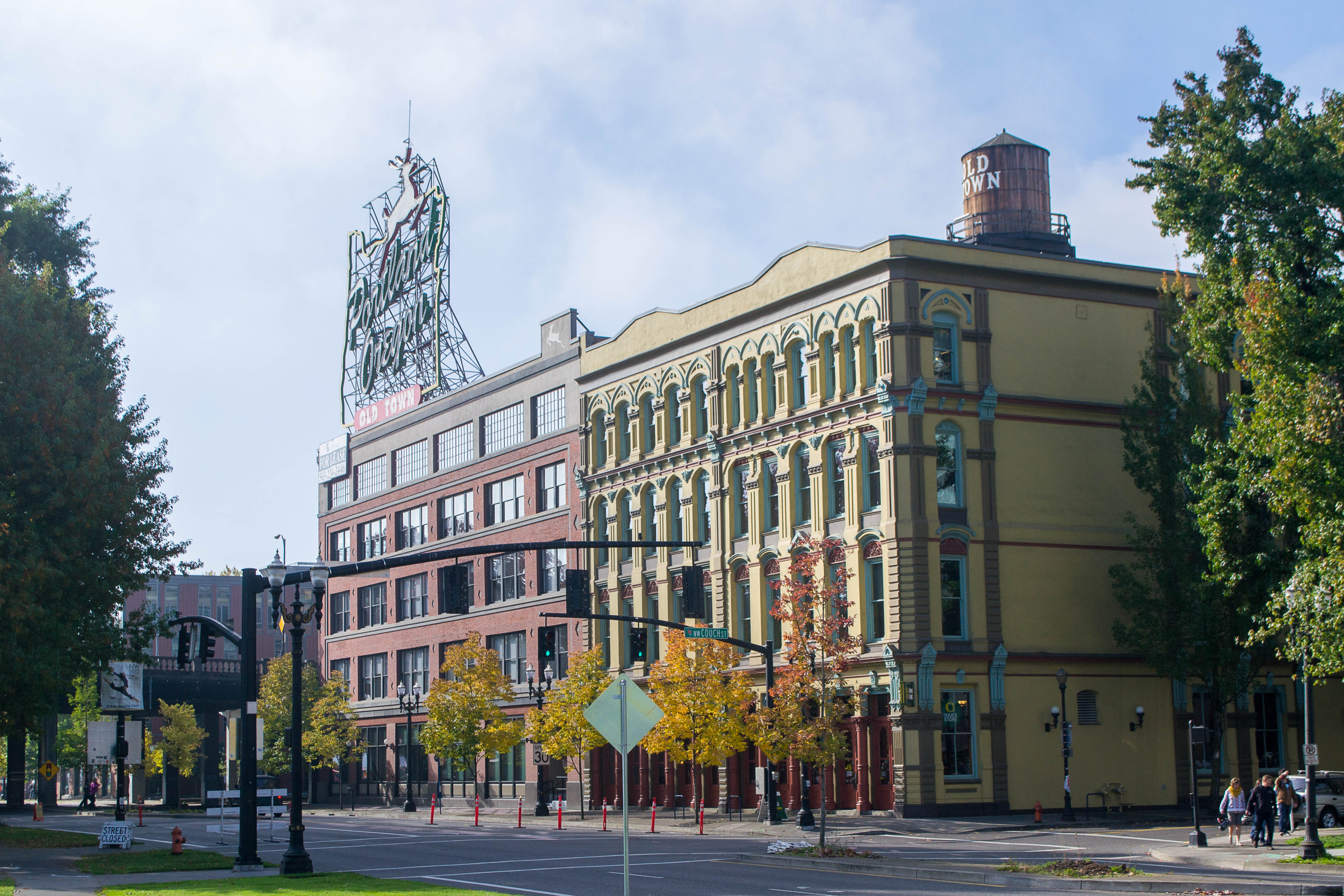
White Stag Block

The neighborhood has many notable buildings, including Blagen Block, the Glisan Building, the Haseltine Building, One Pacific Square, the Oregon Cracker Company Building, the PAE Living Building, Paris Theatre, Smith's Block, the Tuck Lung Building, the United Carriage and Baggage Transfer Building, the Wachsmuth Building, the White Stag Block, and the Wong Laundry Building.

The Hoxton and the Society Hotel operate in the neighborhood, and former hotel buildings include the Hoyt Hotel, the Merchant Hotel, and the demolished Yamaguchi Hotel. Venues include the Roseland Theater and Star Theater and other notable businesses include Ground Kontrol, Pine Street Market, and the Portland Chinatown Museum.

Restaurants in the neighborhood have included Baes Fried Chicken, Barista, Bowery Bagels, Dan and Louis Oyster Bar, Deadstock Coffee, Kells Irish Pub, Kinboshi Ramen, Lechon, Old Town Pizza, Republic Cafe and Ming Lounge, Sushi Ichiban, Tope, and Voodoo Doughnut. Defunct restaurants include Alexis Restaurant, Backspace, Bijou Cafe, Davis Street Tavern, Fong Chong, Gilt Club, Hobo's, House of Louie, Hung Far Low, Mi Mero Mole, Ping, Via Tribunali, and X-Ray Cafe. Bars have included Badlands Portland, CC Slaughters, Darcelle XV Showplace, Dixie Tavern, Raven's Manor, Shanghai Tunnel Bar, and Silverado. Dirty Duck, Embers Avenue, No Vacancy Lounge, The Queen's Head, and Satyricon are among defunct bars in the neighborhood.

=== Transportation ===
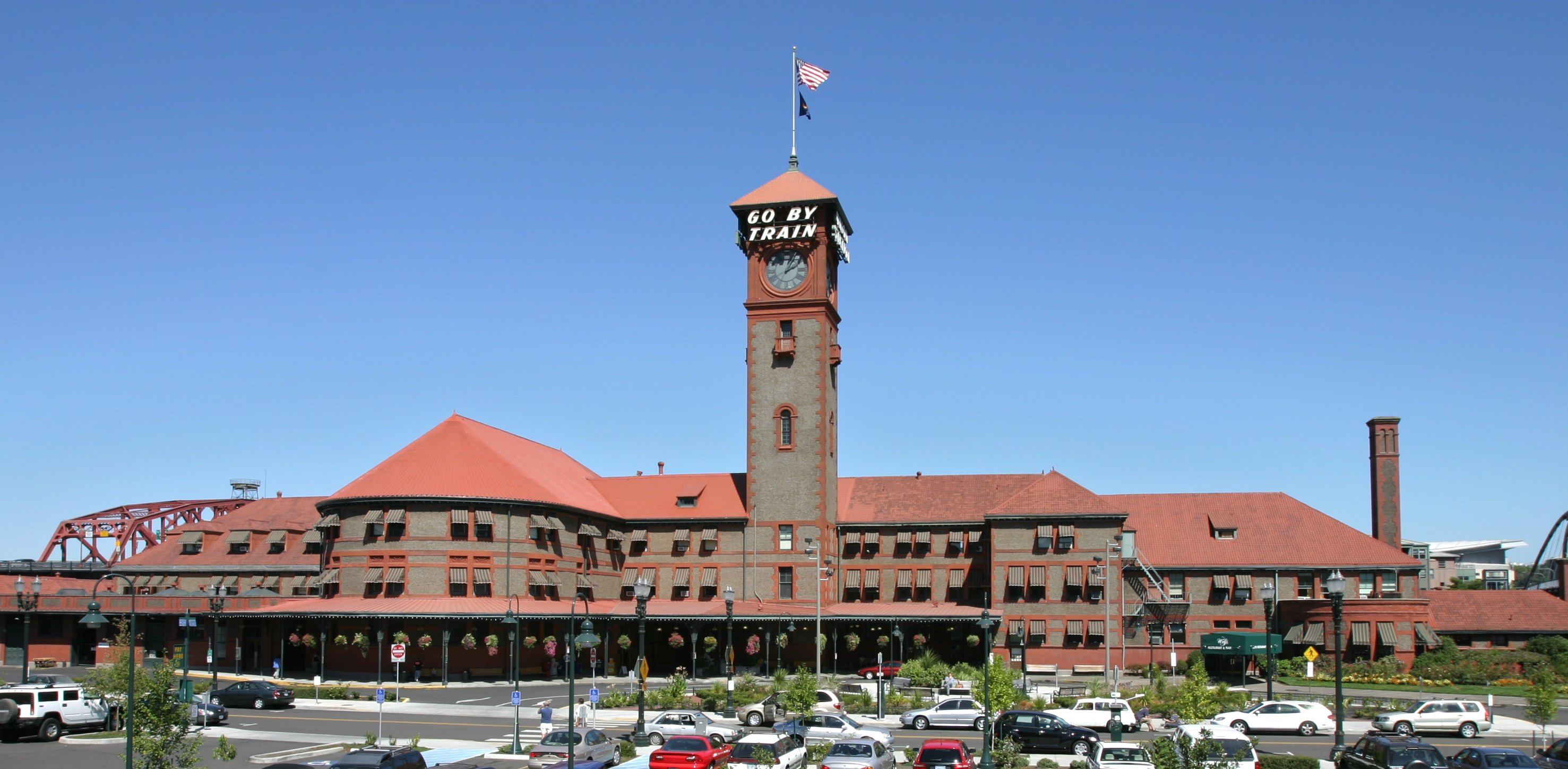
Portland Union Station

The neighborhood is well-served by various modes of transportation. Amtrak's Union Station is located in the northwestern portion of the neighborhood. The Broadway Bridge marks the northern tip, and the ends of the Steel and Burnside bridges are along the area's eastern border. The MAX Light Rail line turns south into the neighborhood from the Steel Bridge and stops at Old Town/Chinatown, Skidmore Fountain, and Oak Street/Southwest 1st Avenue; the system connects the neighborhood to Northeast and North Portland across the Willamette, and to Downtown Portland to the south and west. The Portland Mall begins at the Greyhound Bus Station, providing local bus and light rail service along 5th and 6th Avenues south into downtown.

== Old Town ==
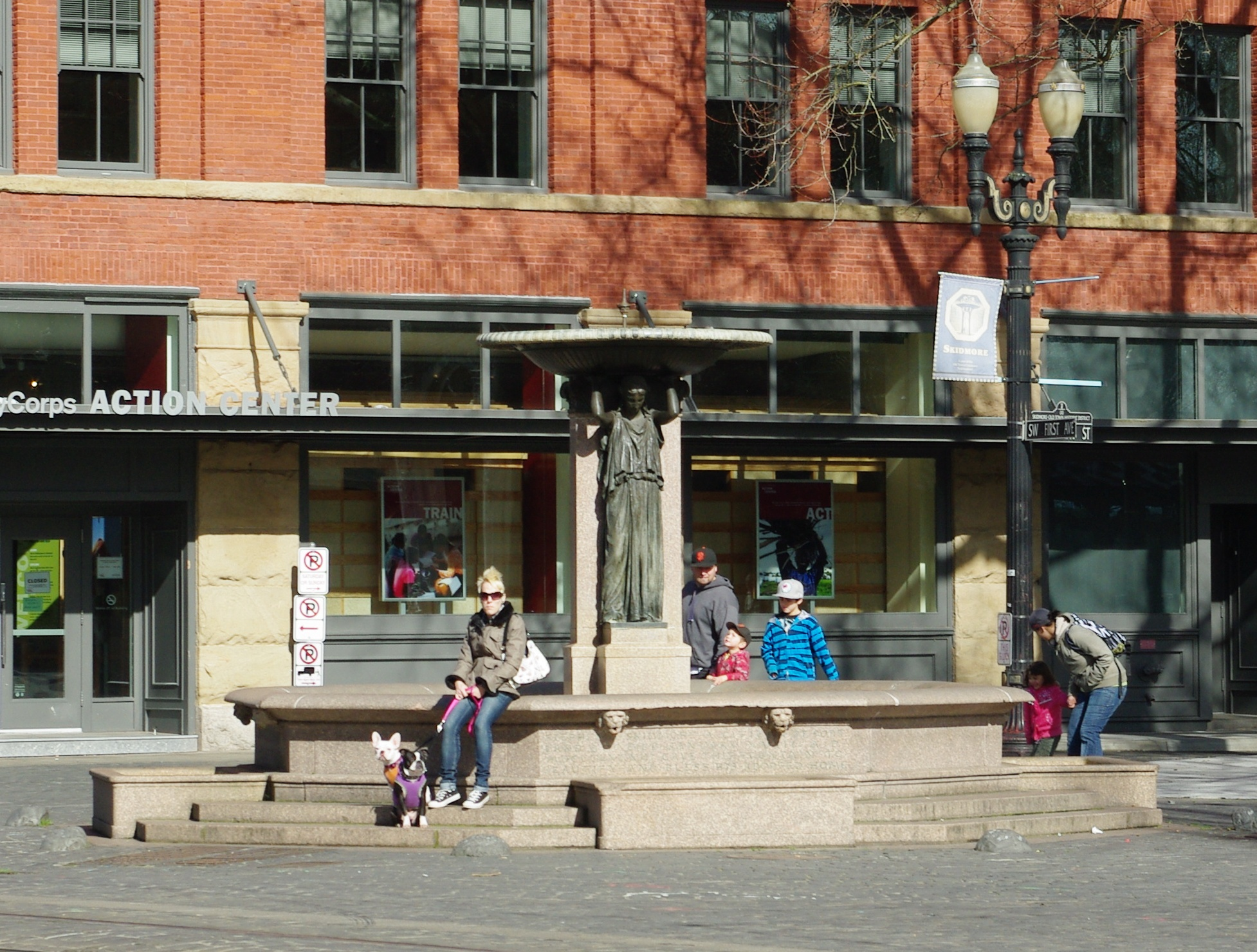
Skidmore Fountain, 2011

Old Town was the original urban core of Portland. It straddles West Burnside Street and includes an area under the Burnside Bridge. The Portland Skidmore/Old Town Historic District, created in 1975 and roughly bounded by Naito Parkway, Everett Street, 3rd Avenue, and Oak Street, is an important part of Old Town Portland. Attractions include the Saturday Market; the Shanghai tunnels; and Ankeny Square, site of Portland's oldest public art work, the Olin L. Warner-designed Skidmore Fountain (dedicated 1888). Naito Parkway (ex-Front Avenue) is named after the late Bill Naito, a longtime Old Town-based businessman and developer, who with his brother Sam Naito in the 1960s helped to halt the decline of the area—then known as Portland's "Skid Road"—by opening a retail store, buying and restoring old buildings in the area, and convincing others to invest in the district over the next several years.

New Market Block, 50 SW 2nd Ave, is an historic six floor building.

The Portland Skidmore/Old Town Historic District was declared a National Historic Landmark in 1977, its national significance based on its historic importance as a major 19th-century west coast port, and also for its collection of cast-iron commercial architecture. In 2016, Portland Mercury described the Old Town as a neighborhood "well known as Portland's primary homeless district."

== Chinatown ==
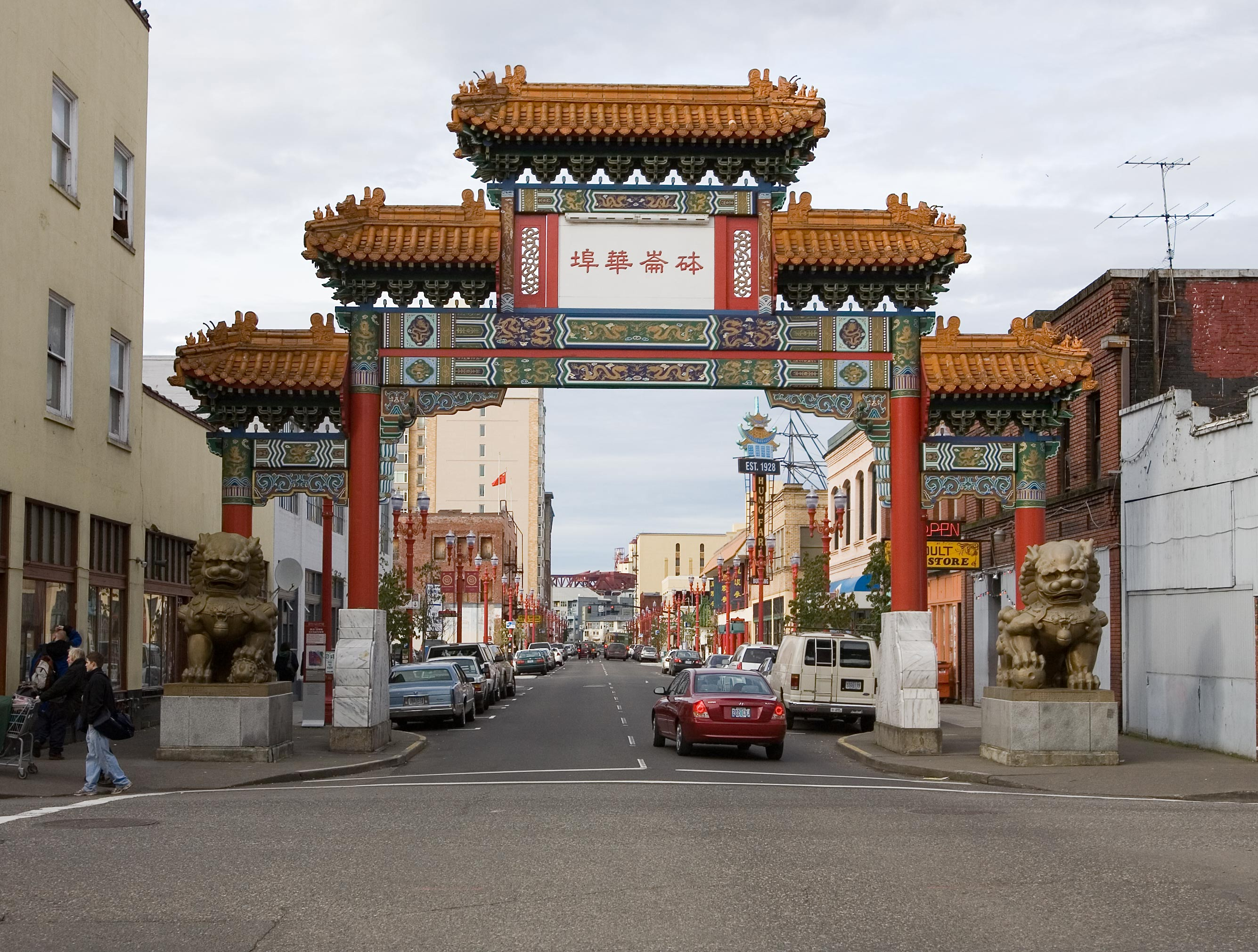
Chinatown Gateway

The Chinatown portion of Old Town extends north from West Burnside Street to Union Station. The entrance is marked by the Chinatown Gateway (built in 1986), complete with a pair of lions, at the corner of Northwest 4th Avenue and West Burnside Street. The core of the area, from West Burnside Street to Northwest Glisan Street and from Northwest 5th Avenue to Northwest 3rd Avenue, was designated in 1989 the Portland New Chinatown/Japantown Historic District.

Major organizations based in Chinatown include the Port of Portland, Oregon Department of Transportation's Portland offices and NW Natural Gas. There is also a parking structure with a helipad on top.

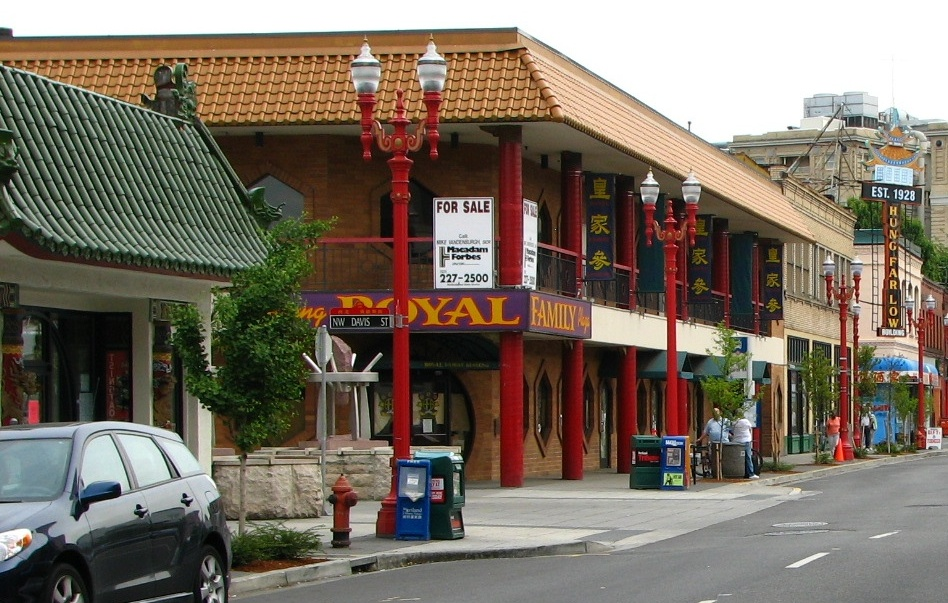
Buildings in Chinatown

In a step towards revitalization of the area, the Lan Su Chinese Garden opened September 14, 2000. The $12.8 million park covers an entire city block and was built by 65 artisans from Suzhou, China of imported materials (though all plants were grown locally). More recently, NW 3rd and 4th Avenues received streetscape improvements, including plaques describing historical features. Two block-long "festival streets" that can easily be used for street festivals were also created between these streets. In 2008, Uwajimaya anchored a redevelopment proposal, similar to the Uwajimaya Village in Seattle's Chinatown-International District. It would host the store, an underground parking garage, mixed-income apartments, and other small retailers. It was hoped to revitalize the area and bring in more tourists.

The street signs in Chinatown are both English and Chinese. The Chinese on the signs is written in traditional characters, and its pronunciation is Cantonese (using Jyutping romanization).

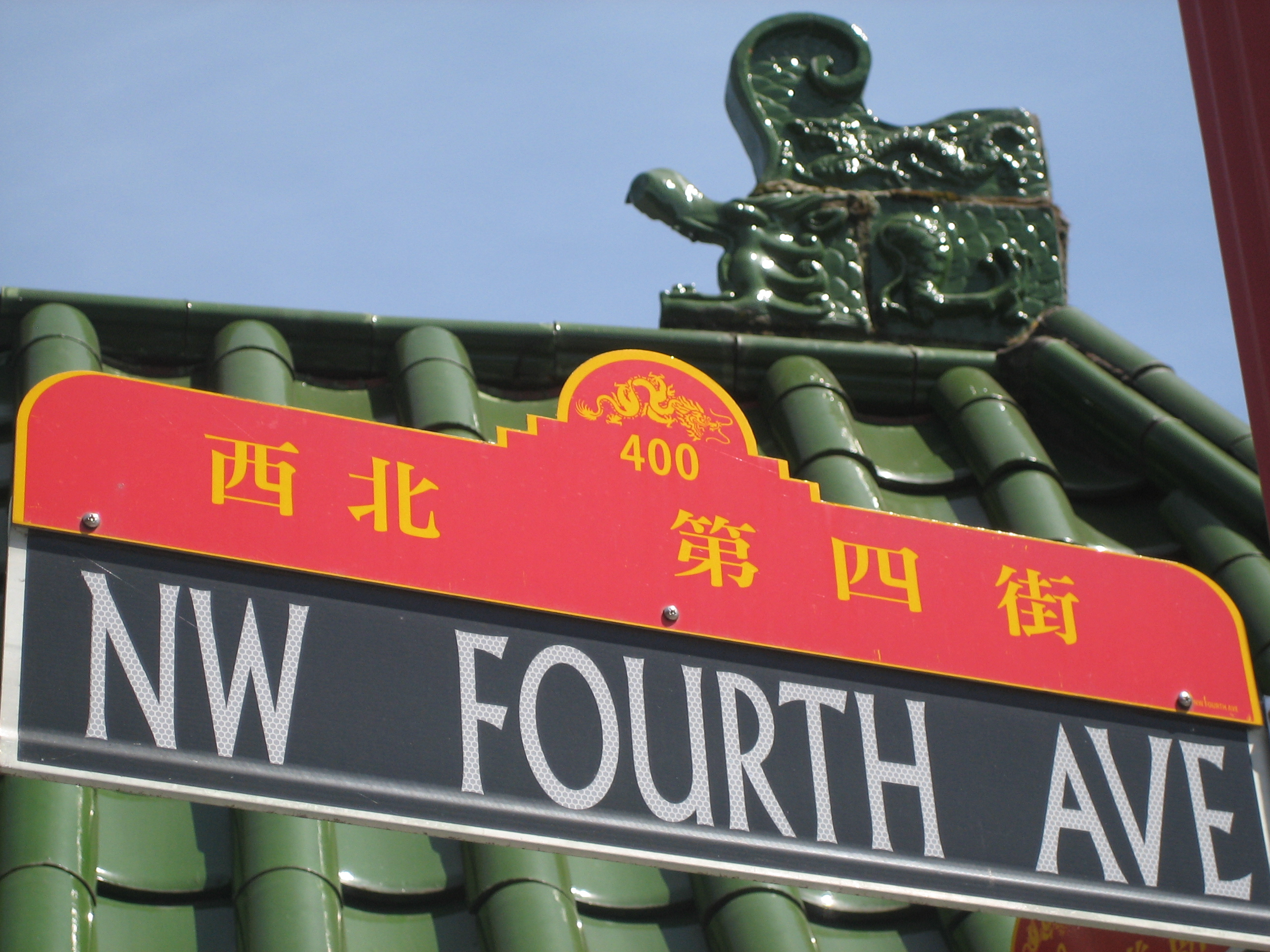
Street sign topper in Chinatown

- W Burnside Street — 西本世街 — sai1 bun2 sai3 gaai1
- NW Couch Street — 西北葛珠街 — sai1 bak1 got3 zyu1 gaai1
- NW Davis Street — 西北戴維斯街 — sai1 bak1 daai3 wai4 si1 gaai1
- NW Everett Street — 西北愛和烈街 — sai1 bak1 ngoi3 wo4 lit6 gaai1
- NW Fifth Avenue — 西北第五街 — sai1 bak1 dai6 ng5 gaai1
- NW Flanders Street — 西北芬蘭達士街 — sai1 bak1 fan1 laan4 daat6 si6 gaai1
- NW Fourth Avenue — 西北第四街 — sai1 bak1 dai6 sei3 gaai1
- NW Glisan Street — 西北紀利臣街 — sai1 bak1 gei2 lei6 san4 gaai1
- NW Third Avenue — 西北第三街 — sai1 bak1 dai6 saam1 gaai1

=== Japantown history ===
Prior to World War II, the area that is today called Chinatown was Portland's Japantown. Beginning in the 1890s, many Japanese immigrants were processed through Portland, creating a demand for hotels, bathhouses, and other services. Businesses that formed in the city's Japantown thrived in the low-rent areas near the river. Before World War II, the Japantown in the Northwest District was home to more than 100 businesses, and was Oregon's largest Japantown. Today the Japanese American Historical Plaza and the Oregon Nikkei Legacy Center in what is today Portland's Chinatown serve as reminders of what was once Portland's Japantown.

== See also ==
- Pensole
