= Bowery Bagels =

Restaurant in Portland, Oregon, U.S.

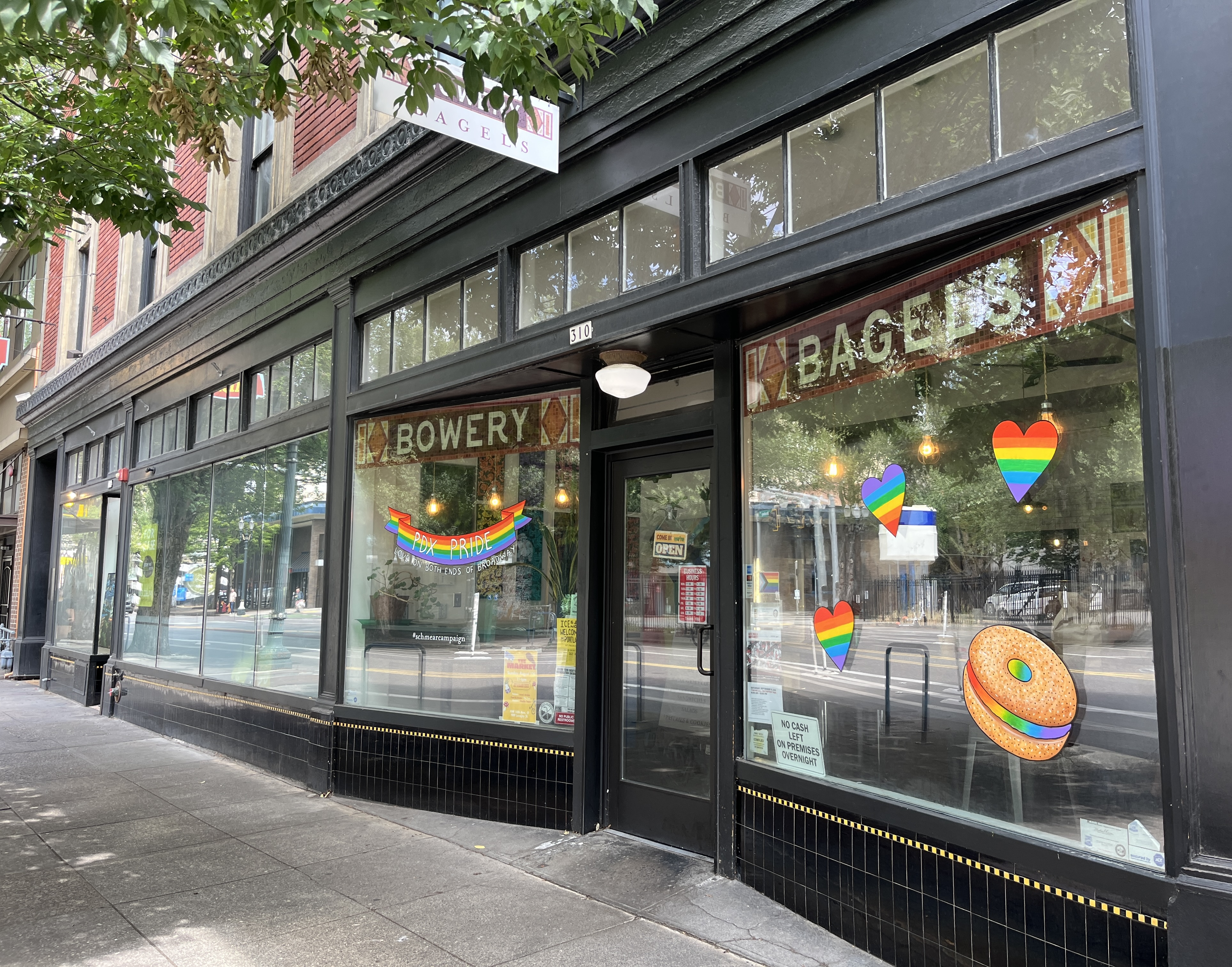
- Exterior of the shop on Broadway in the northwest Portland part of the Old Town Chinatown neighborhood, 2025
- Interactive map of Bowery Bagels

Restaurant information
- Established: June 2012
- Owner: Michael Madigan
- Location: Portland, Multnomah, Oregon, United States
- Coordinates: 45.5254°N 122.6774°W
- Website: bowerybagels.com

Bowery Bagels is a bagel company in Portland, Oregon, United States. Owner Michael Madigan opened the original shop on Broadway in Old Town Chinatown in 2012, serving New York-style bagels.

== Description ==
The Bowery Bagles serves New York-style bagels in Portland, Oregon. The original bagelry and coffee shop operates on Broadway in the northwest Portland part of the Old Town Chinatown neighborhood. The interior has white subway tiles, a sign for New York City Subway's Bowery station, and a tile mosaic above the coffee station. On weekdays, Bowery also operates from within the Smith Memorial Student Union on the Portland State University campus.

=== Menu ===
The four-ounce bagels are inspired by ones the owner enjoyed at a young age at Glendale Bakery, a German bakery in Queens. Among varieties at Bowery are cinnamon raisin spice, everything, onion, plain, poppy seed, pumpernickel, salt and pepper, sea salt, sesame, and whole grain. Spreads use ingredients like cream cheese, bacon, mushroom, and onion. Other bagel toppings include kimchi, smoked salmon, and roasted vegetables. The gravlax is prepared with dill, fennel leaves, and Clear Creek Distillery's Eau de Vie of Douglas Fir vodka.

Bowery also serves breakfast sandwiches and grilled cheese. Among breakfast sandwiches is the Burnside (bacon, egg, and cheddar cheese), the Fremont (sausage, egg, cheddar), and the Lent, which has caramelized onion, egg, and Gruyère cheese. The Jesse Applegate has vegan sausage, egg, and cheese, and the Simon Benson has ham, egg, and cheese. The Flanders sandwich has eggplant and zucchini on focaccia with red pepper, arugula pesto, chevre, red onion, and lettuce. The Lovejoy has turkey meat on a baguette, with black pepper mayonnaise, white cheddar, peppadews, and watercress, and the Pettygrove has pork loin on multigrain bread with apple and celeriac coleslaw, gouda cheese, mustard, and red leaf lettuce. The Stark sandwich has roast beef on ciabatta with mushroom duxelle, gruyere, pickled shallots, and arugula. Bowery has also served soup, as well as coffee from Stumptown.

== History ==
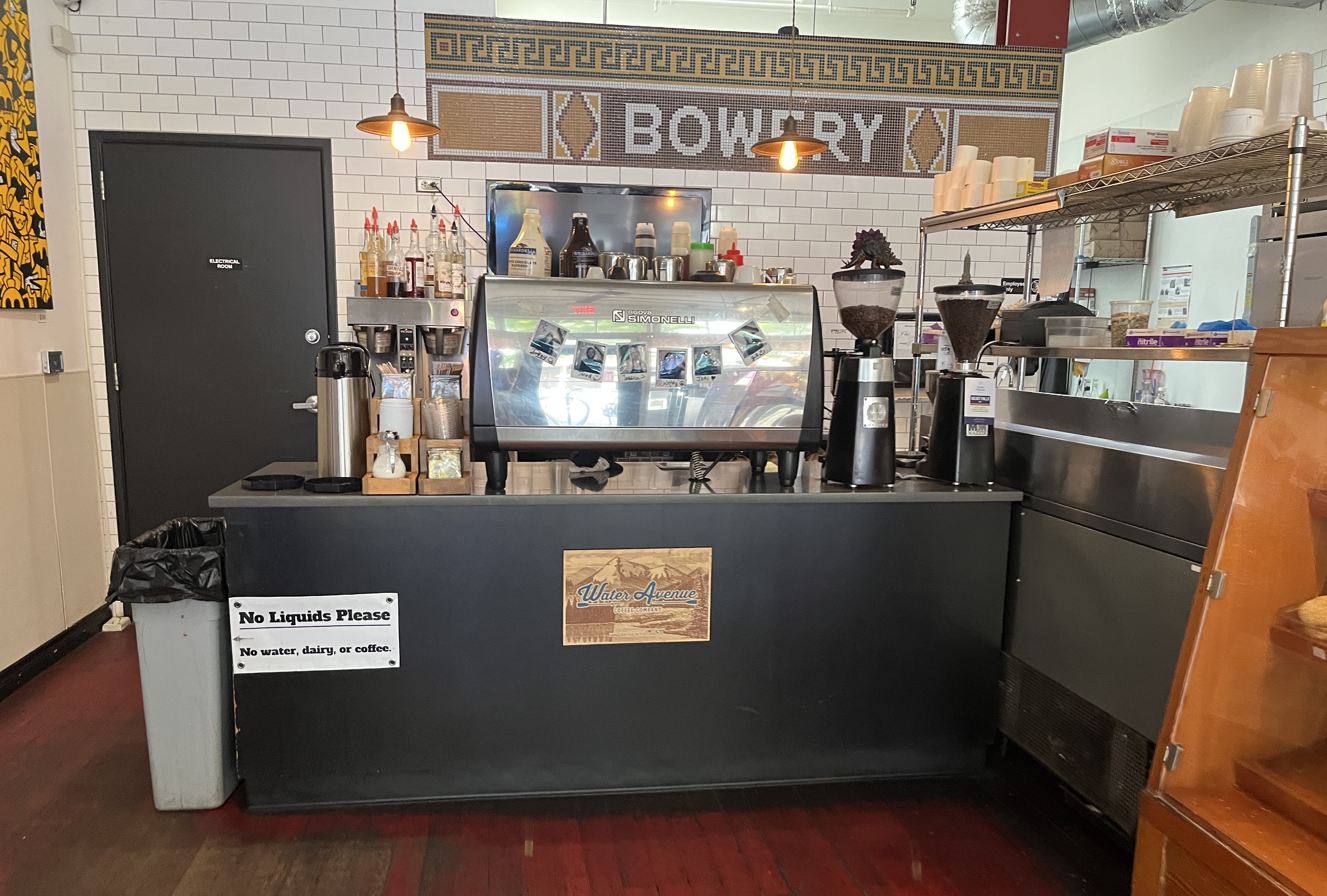
Interior of the original shop in 2025

Bowery is owned by Michael Madigan. The original shop opened in Old Town Chinatown in June 2012, in a space previously used as an optometrist shop and an art gallery called Ogle.

In 2015, the business announced plans to expand, signing a five-year lease on a 5,000-square-foot space in north Portland's Kenton neighborhood, previously used as a warehouse, for all production of all-kosher baked goods.

== Reception ==
Bowery ranked fourth in Willamette Week's 2017 blind taste test of fourteen bagel shops in the Portland metropolitan area, with a score of 57 out of 100. Daniel Barnett, Brooke Jackson-Glidden, and Nathan Williams included Bowery in Eater Portland's 2024 overview of ten "real-deal" bagel shops in the city.

== See also ==
- List of bakeries
