= Gilt Club =

Defunct restaurant in Portland, Oregon, U.S.

- Interactive map of Gilt Club

Restaurant information
- Established: 2005
- Closed: 2014
- Owner: Jamie Dunn
- Location: 306 Northwest Broadway, Portland, Multnomah, Oregon, 97209, United States
- Coordinates: 45°31′31″N 122°40′38.5″W

Gilt Club was a restaurant in Portland, Oregon, operating in Old Town Chinatown from 2005 to 2014.

== History ==
In 2005, Owner Jamie Dunn opened the restaurant at the corner of Everett and Broadway in the northwest Portland part of Old Town Chinatown. Gilt Club appeared on the Food Network and Portlandia. Executive chef Chris Carriker left in 2013. The restaurant closed in 2014.

== Reception ==
In 2016, Grant Butler included Gilt Club in The Oregonian's overview of "97 long-gone Portland restaurants we wish were still around".
