= Haseltine Building =

Historic building in Portland, Oregon, U.S.

- U.S. Historic district – Contributing property
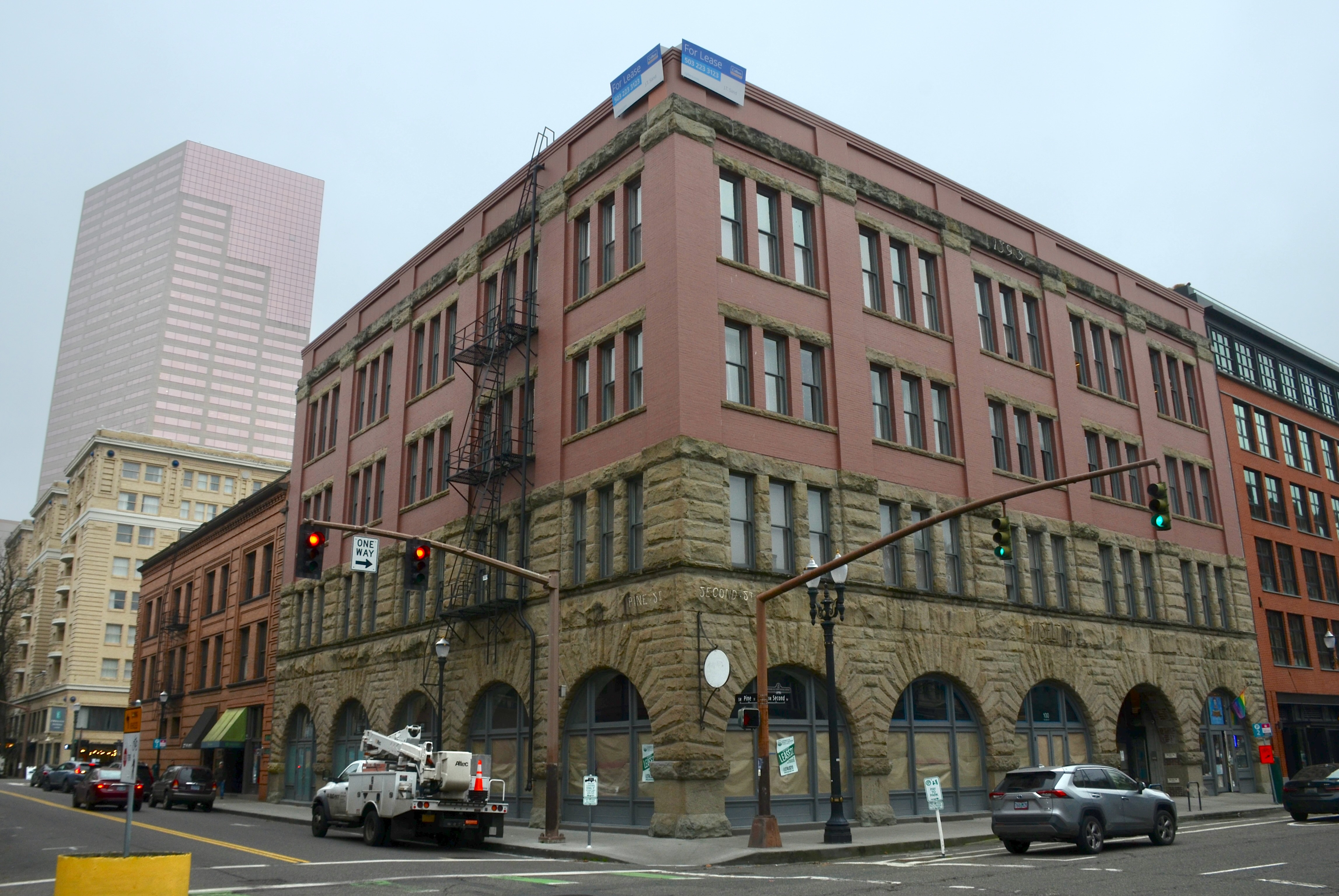
- Exterior from southeast in 2025

- Location within Portland, Oregon
- Location: 133 SW Second Avenue; Portland, Oregon
- Coordinates: 45°31′17.7″N 122°40′22.3″W
- Built: 1893
- Architectural style: Richardsonian Romanesque
- Part of: Portland Skidmore/Old Town Historic District (ID75001597)
- Designated CP: December 5, 1975

The Haseltine Building is a historic property in Portland, Oregon, near the Willamette River and on the edge of the city's Central Business district, downtown. Located at the intersection of Southwest 2nd Avenue and Ash Street, the building was designed by architects McGraw & Martin, and built in 1893. It was originally used by J.E. Haseltine & Co., a family-owned and operated company that sold hardware, supplies and equipment from 1883 to 1961. In 1975, it was listed as a "primary landmark" in the National Register of Historic Places (NRHP) nomination of the Portland Skidmore/Old Town Historic District, the building's designation subsequently "translated" to "contributing property" under post-1970s NRHP terminology.

The building underwent a significant renovation in 2020.
