= The Green Man of Portland =

Sculpture series in Portland, Oregon, U.S.

- Part of the installation in 2017
- Artist: Daniel Duford
- Year: 2009
- Medium: Bronze; cast concrete; porcelain enamel on steel
- Location: Portland, Oregon, United States; 45°31′27.1″N 122°40′35.1″W
- Owner: City of Portland and Multnomah County Public Art Collection courtesy of the Regional Arts & Culture Council

The Green Man of Portland, also alternatively known as The Legend of the Green Man of Portland, is a 2009 art installation by artist Daniel Duford, located in Portland, Oregon, United States.

== Description ==
Daniel Duford's The Green Man of Portland is a 2009 art installation consisting of two outdoor sculptures and eight "story markers" that form a poem. They are installed along ten blocks in Portland's Old Town Chinatown neighborhood. Materials include bronze, cast concrete, and porcelain enamel on steel. According to the artist, the work's imagery was inspired by 1970s horror comics and Works Progress Administration (WPA) posters. Duford has said of the installation:

With The Green Man of Portland, I have created a fake legend. It goes like this: ever since Portland's founding there have been sightings of small green archers. Whenever the archer hits someone with an arrow, her vision changes. Flowers grow from the heads of passersby, a building called The Greenwood appears, and a giant tree towers over the city. On certain nights, a great white celestial stag is spied in the skies over Portland... The legend encompasses all the varied, transitory communities that call Old Town and Chinatown home. My great hope for this piece is that The Green Man of Portland will quietly twine itself into the fabric and many-layered history of the community.

The work is part of the City of Portland and Multnomah County Public Art Collection courtesy of the Regional Arts & Culture Council.

== See also ==
- 2009 in art
- Green Man
