= Greyhound Bus Station (Portland, Oregon) =

Building in Portland, Oregon, U.S.

Coordinates: 45°31′38.4″N 122°40′34.3″W

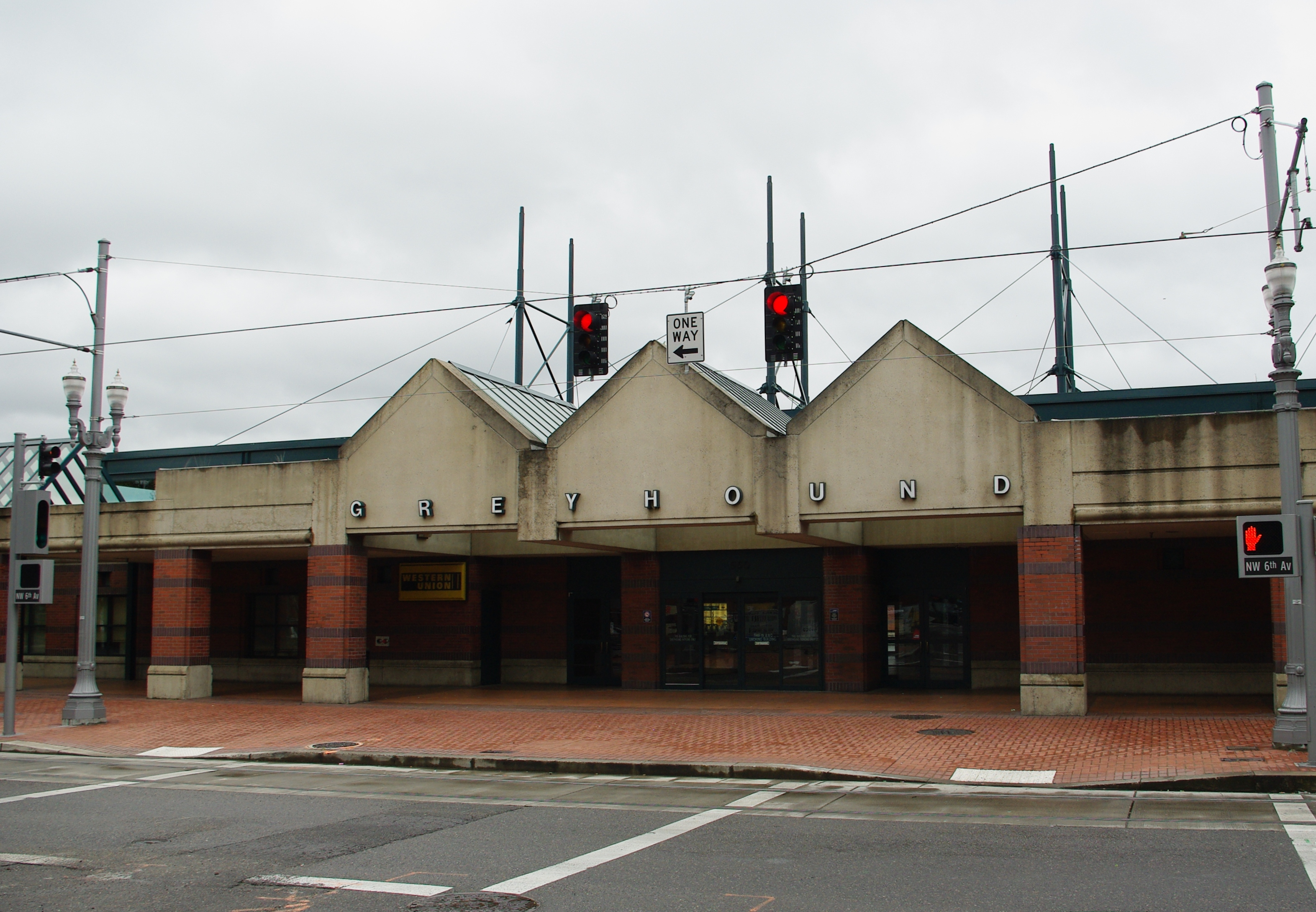

General information
- Location: Portland, Oregon; United States
- System: Bus station
Location

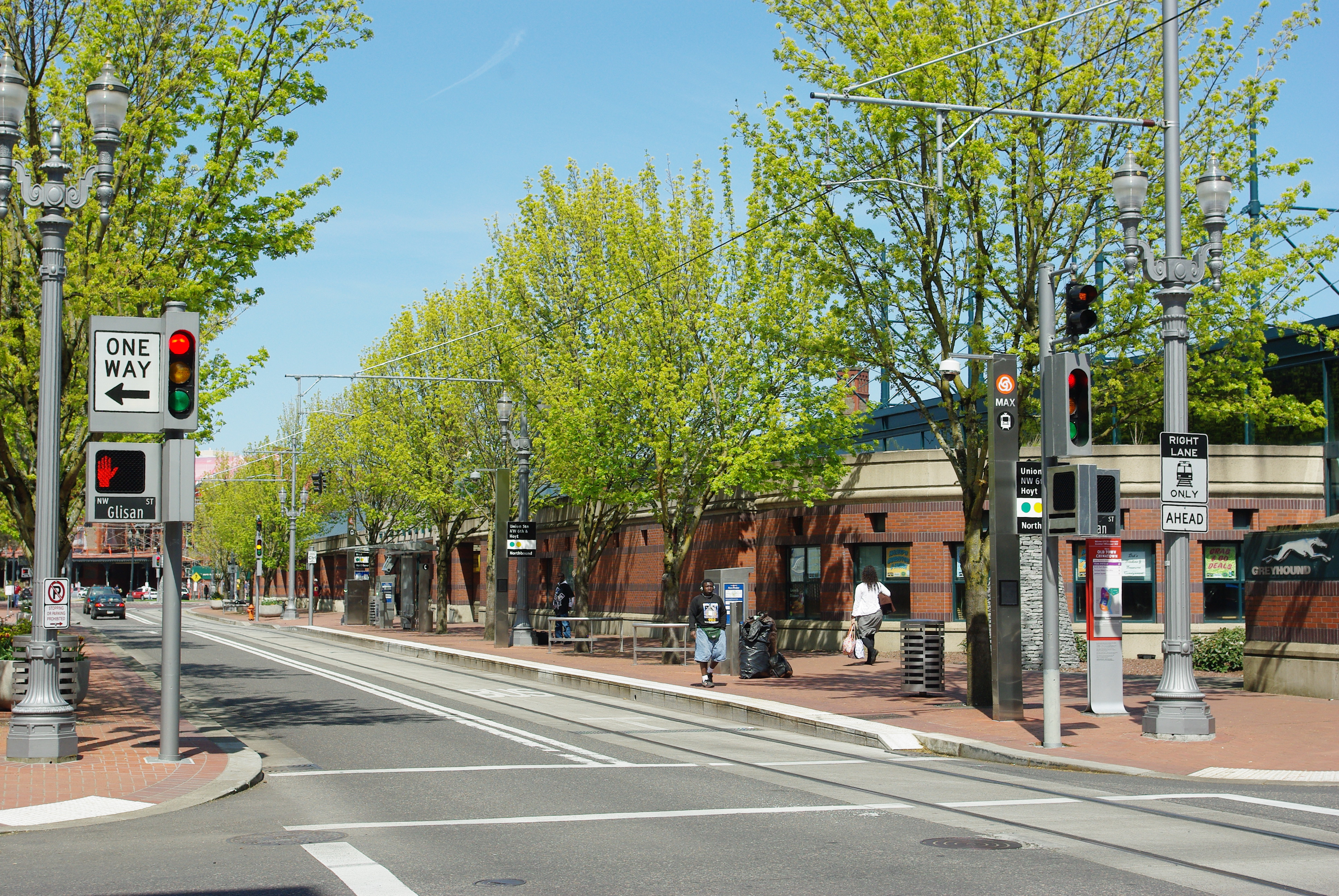
Viewed from the southwest in 2011

Greyhound Lines operated a bus station and terminal in Portland, Oregon's Old Town Chinatown, until 2019. It was used by Greyhound for about 30 years. Between 2020 and 2025, it was used as a 90 bed "low barrier" homeless shelter. In 2026, area transit TriMet announced it will be buying the building to use as bus storage and a layover facility.
