= Davis Street Tavern =

Defunct restaurant in Portland, Oregon, U.S.

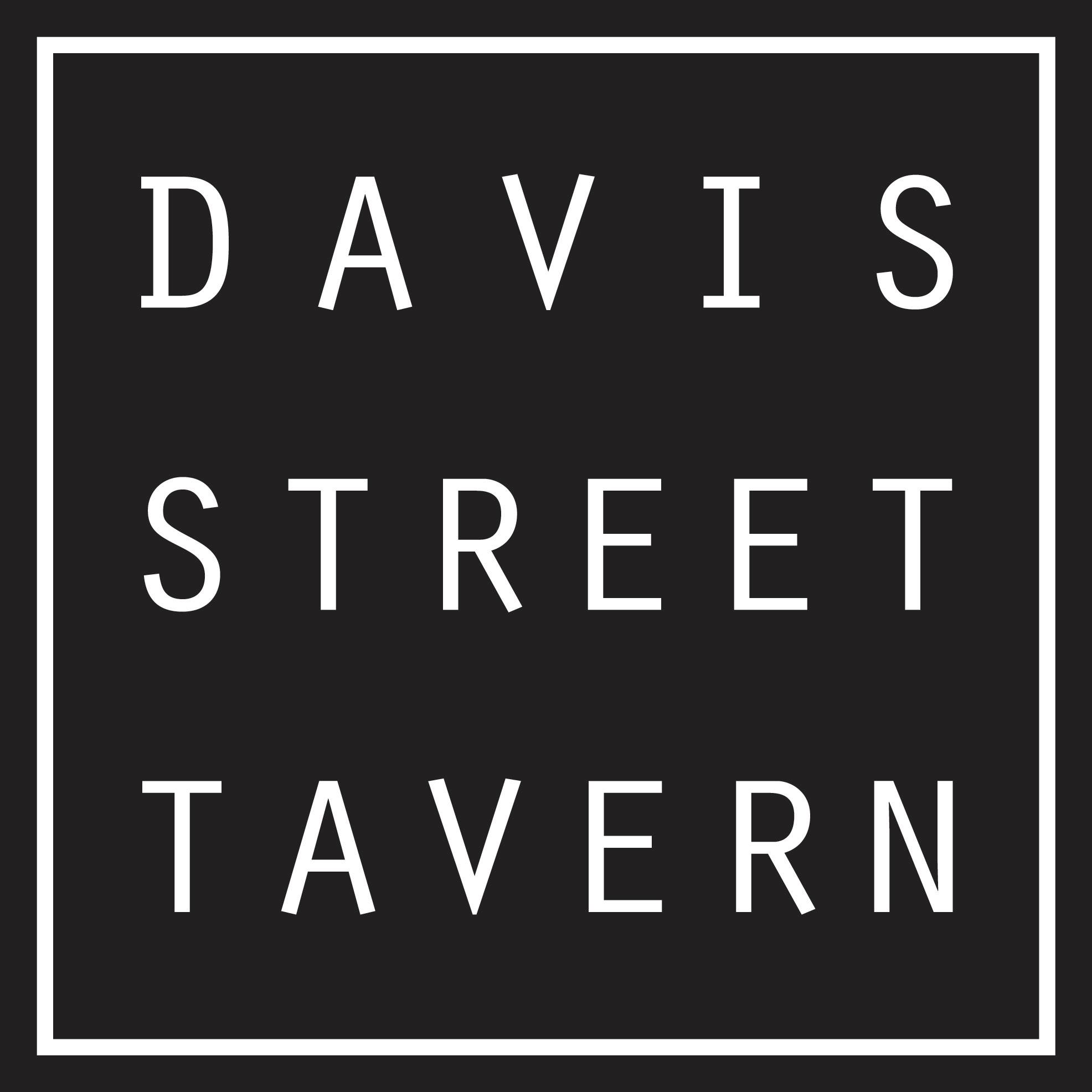

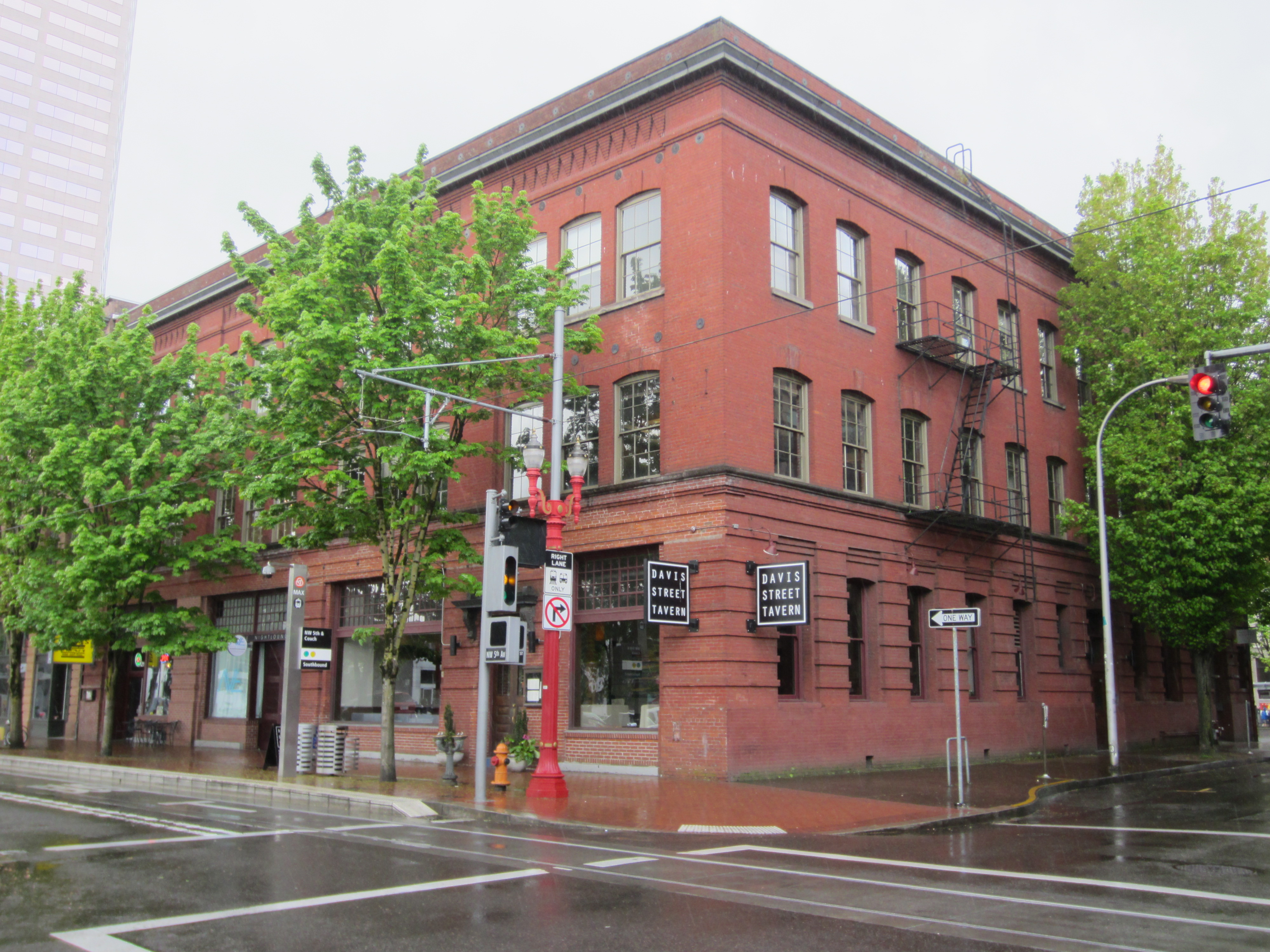
- The restaurant's exterior in 2014
- Interactive map of Davis Street Tavern

Restaurant information
- Established: 2008
- Closed: September 2016
- Owners: Christopher Handford; Blake Smith
- Previous owner: Gabriel Kapustka (2008 – September 2010)
- Head chef: Gabriel Kapustka (2008 – September 2010); Scott Shampine (November 2010 – February 2011); Katy Jane Millard
- Food type: American
- Location: 500 Northwest Davis Street, Portland, Multnomah, Oregon, 97209, United States
- Coordinates: 45.524366°N 122.675527°W

Davis Street Tavern was a restaurant in Portland, Oregon's Old Town Chinatown neighborhood, in the United States. Christopher Handford, chef Gabriel Kapustka, and Handford's cousin Blake Smith opened the restaurant serving American cuisine in 2008. The building that housed it was previously a bakery. Kapustka left in 2010, after being bought out by partners. Subsequent executive chefs were Scott Shampine and Katy Jane Millard. The restaurant hosted an annual supper celebrating Robert Burns. In 2012, Davis Street Tavern and the Oregon Restaurant and Lodging Association led an effort by industry groups to overturn the U.S. Department of Labor's rules prohibiting gratuity sharing with kitchen staff. The restaurant closed in September 2016.

== Description ==
Davis Street Tavern was a restaurant located at the intersection of Northwest Davis Street and Fifth Avenue in downtown Portland's Old Town Chinatown neighborhood, offering a menu with American cuisine.

Housed in a historic building previously used as a bakery, a major remodel resulted in an interior with exposed brick and high ceilings. The décor has been described as "a beige hipness for fortysomething professionals". In her 2012 book Portland, Oregon Chef's Table: Extraordinary Recipes from the City of Roses, Laurie Wolf wrote:

The restaurant is huge. There is seating for about one hundred people between the front dining room and bar and the back two-level dining area and the outdoor tables. The main room is handsome and comfortable, with spacious tables and booths, neutral tones, wood beams, and exposed pipes.

=== Menu ===
Hanger steaks came with green chili pepper hollandaise sauce and home fries, and pulled pork sandwiches were served with blue cheese potato salad. Seared chicken breast came with macaroni and cheese, pancetta, and broccolini, and pan-fried quail was served with hazelnut and quinoa stuffing, topped with marionberry gastrique, as well as escarole. Steamed mussels were served in a "Thai-inspired, tom kha-esque" broth. The Caesar salad had Romaine lettuce, boquerones, parmesan, and toasted focaccia croutons. A "slightly caramel-sweet" Dungeness crab bisque and sautéed squash were also on the menu. The dessert menu included chèvre cheesecake.

== History ==
=== Leadership and operational history ===
Christopher Handford and chef Gabriel Kapustka opened Davis Street Tavern in 2008. The two were co-owners, as of March 2010. Handford's cousin Blake Smith has also been credited as a co-owner and for opening the restaurant. After approximately 18 months with Davis Street Tavern, Kapustka asked to be bought out by his partners. He left the restaurant in September 2010. Scott Shampine became executive chef in November, having served as an advisor and offering kitchen support for the previous few months, especially after Kapustka's departure. Smith confirmed Shampine's departure in February. Katy Jane Millard replaced Shampine in March 2011.

In 2012, Davis Street Tavern and the Oregon Restaurant and Lodging Association led an effort by restaurant industry groups to overturn the U.S. Department of Labor's rules prohibiting gratuity sharing with kitchen staff. The federal suit was filed in the District Court for the District of Oregon on July 12, with plaintiffs arguing the rules violated the Court of Appeals for the Ninth Circuit's 2010 ruling in Cumbie v. Woody Woo Inc., which decided "employers may institute tip pools that include kitchen workers if the employer pays employees full minimum wage and meet other criteria". The plaintiffs were represented by Jackson Lewis.

Davis Street Tavern closed in September 2016.

=== Events ===
In May 2010, Davis Street Tavern hosted an after-party for the "pig cook-off" known as Cochon 555. Later in the evening, event co-founder Brady Lowe and Eric Bechard, a chef at the restaurant Thistle, got into a fight outside a local strip club; Lowe's leg was fractured during the incident. Bechard was reportedly upset at Lowe for allowing non-local pigs into the event. Eater Portland's Mattie John Bamman described the altercation as "one of the Oregon hospitality industry's most infamous brawls".

Kapustka and chef Ryan McMullan represented Portland on the second season of the Food Network's Chefs vs. City. Davis Street Tavern hosted a viewing party for the June 25, 2010, episode. In July, the restaurant took part in Yelp's "drinks week", which saw establishments offer three drinks at happy hour prices for an entire week. In 2011, Davis Street Tavern participated in the Chehalem Mountains Winegrowers' Mountains to Metro (previously called Pinots in the Pearl), an annual winery event showcasing the viticultural area. The restaurant also hosted Willamette Week's Skidmore Prize Celebration and Give!Guide Kickoff; the former recognizes individuals for quality nonprofit work and the annual Give!Guide raises funds for local charity groups.

Davis Street Tavern's annual Robert Burns Supper celebrated the Scottish poet and lyricist. The 2013 event featured Great Highland bagpipes, poetry, and a three-course prix fixe menu with haggis, cock-a-leekie, and Scotch pairings. The restaurant hosted Joto Sake to offer guests five types of sake and a collaborative dinner pairing "the Japanese spirit with American food" in August 2013.

== Reception ==
In 2009, Patrick Alan Coleman of the Portland Mercury wrote, "In a city so earnest about the perfection and provenance of food, there's something oddly refreshing about dining at a restaurant where there is not a single assurance of ethics or high-minded cuisine. The Davis Street Tavern seems to be concerned with nothing more than providing a straight-ahead, if slightly skewed, menu of American bistro classics .. Based on the price, and the décor, Davis Street is the kind of place where the perennially fussy—food critics, say, or finicky debutantes—can still nit-pick their way through a meal and remain completely satisfied. Wolf opined in 2012, "This is a restaurant where you always feel welcome and never rushed." Portland Monthly described Davis Street Tavern as "a taste of the Pearl in Old Town" and "forever charming" with an "elegant feel". Thrillist described the menu as "innovative comfort food ... with inventive twists".

Eater Portland's Mattie John Bamman said the restaurant was "beloved for its happy hour and power-lunches". In an article about the restaurant's closure, Bamman said of the Cochon 555 altercation, "The story lives on as a reminder of the city's commitment to local sourcing, as well as a warning to not take it too seriously."

== See also ==
- Tavern
