= Wachsmuth Building =

Building in Portland, Oregon, U.S.

- U.S. Historic district – Contributing property
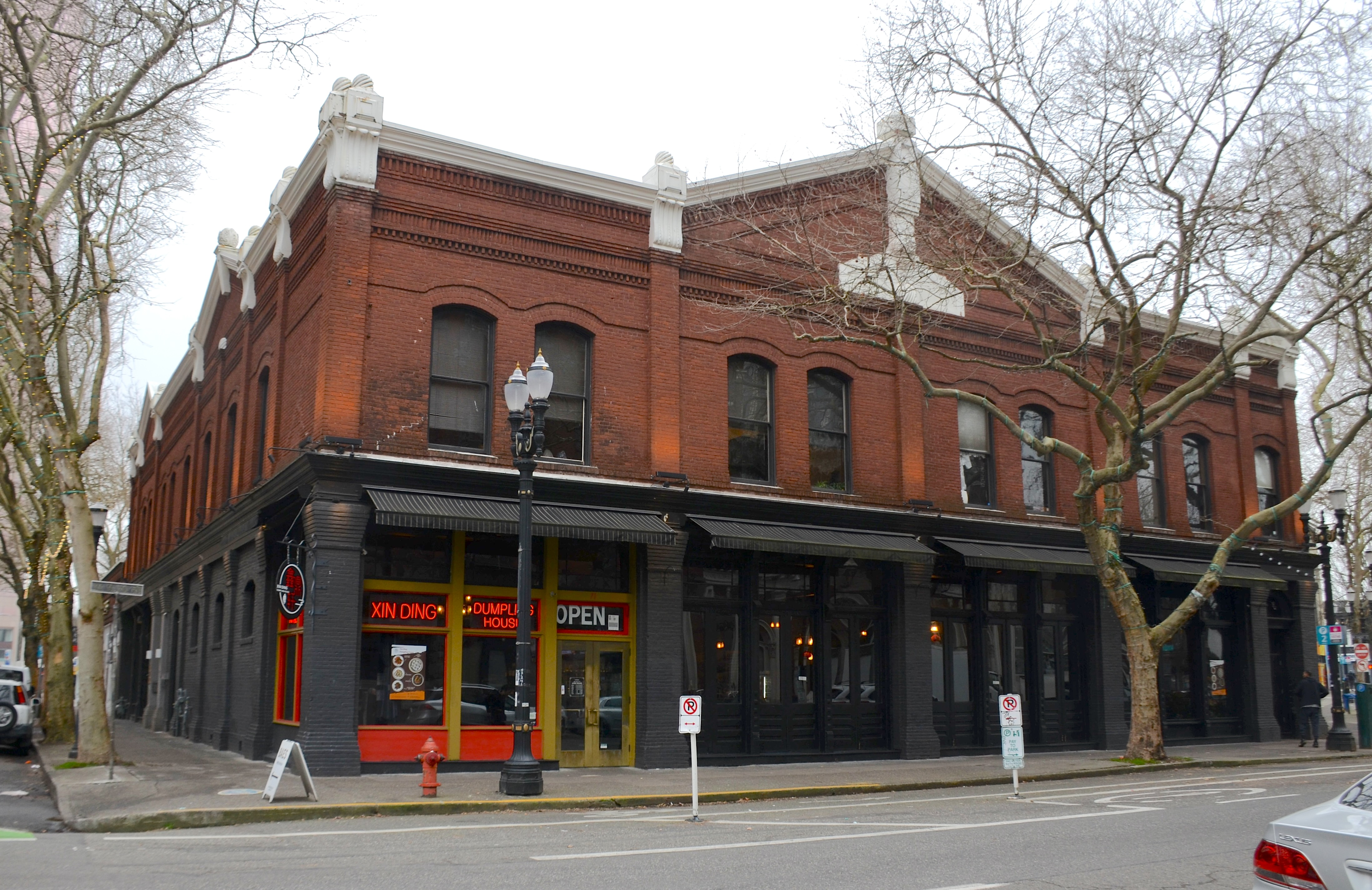
- East façade in 2025

- Location within Portland, Oregon
- Location: 223–225 SW Ash Street; Portland, Oregon
- Coordinates: 45°31′20″N 122°40′21.5″W
- Built: 1892
- Architect: Unknown
- Architectural style: Italianate
- Part of: Portland Skidmore/Old Town Historic District (ID75001597)
- Designated CP: December 5, 1975

The Wachsmuth Building (historically known as the Bickel Building) is a building in Portland, Oregon, United States. The structure was built in 1892. In 1975, it was listed as a "primary landmark" in the National Register of Historic Places (NRHP) nomination of the Portland Skidmore/Old Town Historic District, the building's designation subsequently "translated" to "contributing property" under post-1970s NRHP terminology.

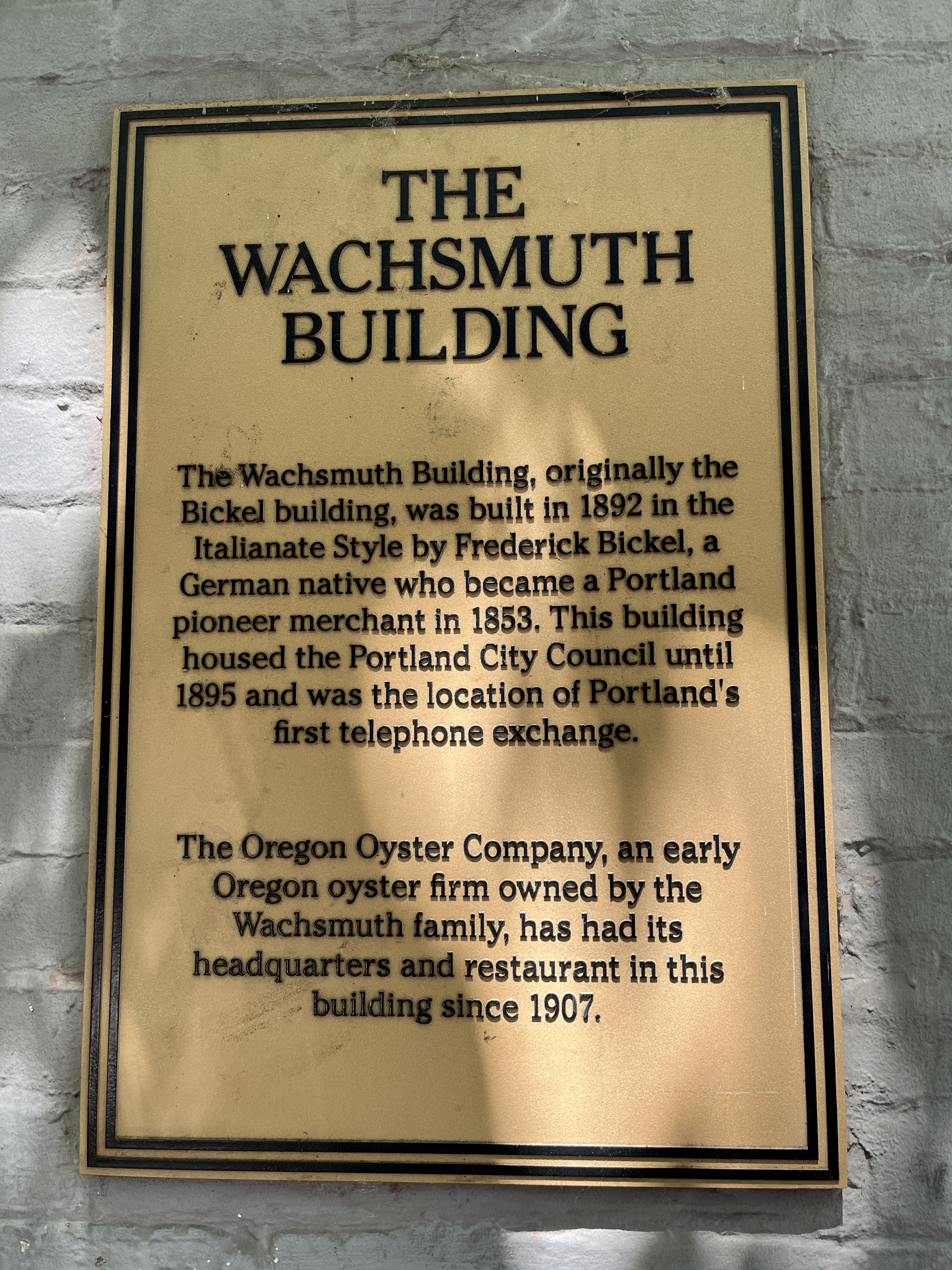
Plaque
