= Sisters of the Road =

Organization based in Portland, Oregon, U.S.

- Location: Portland, Oregon, United States
- Website: sistersoftheroad.org

Sisters of the Road is an organization based in Portland, Oregon, United States. The organization has operated Sisters of the Road Cafe in Old Town Chinatown.

== See also ==
- List of restaurants in Portland, Oregon
