= Tuck Lung Building =

Building in Portland, Oregon, U.S.

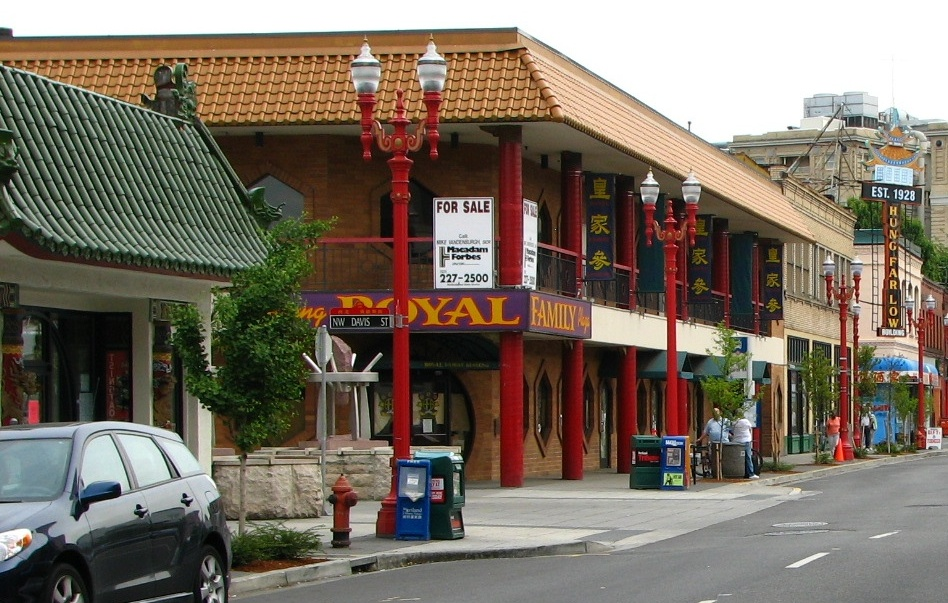
- The building's exterior in 2008

General information
- Location: Portland, Oregon, United States
- Coordinates: 45°31′27.5″N 122°40′27″W

The Tuck Lung Building is a historic building in Portland, Oregon's Old Town Chinatown neighborhood, in the United States.
