= House of Louie =

Defunct Chinese restaurant in Portland, Oregon, U.S.

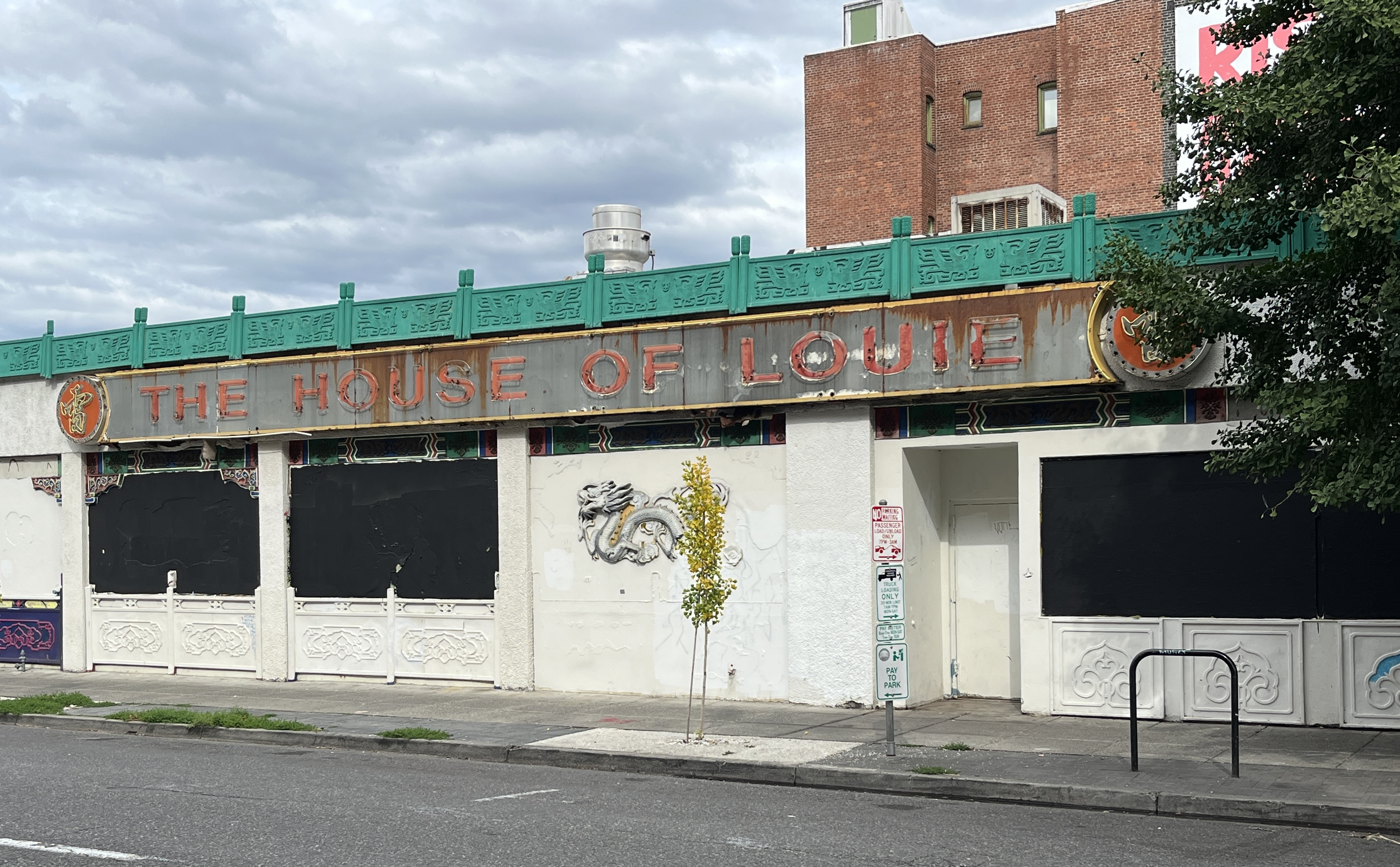
- The restaurant's exterior in 2025
- Interactive map of House of Louie

Restaurant information
- Location: 331 Northwest Davis Street, Portland, Multnomah, Oregon, United States
- Coordinates: 45.52476°N 122.67416°W

House of Louie was a Chinese restaurant in Portland, Oregon's Old Town Chinatown neighborhood, in the United States.

== History ==
The restaurant was managed by James Leung, as of 2006, and closed in 2018 after operating for 30 years.

In 2023, the building that housed the restaurant was purchased by the nonprofit organization Sisters of the Road. The group planned to use the building for offices and a cafe, opening in June 2025. As of October 2024 it is reported that the sale fell through due to lack of funding.

== See also ==
- List of Chinese restaurants
- History of Chinese Americans in Portland, Oregon
