= Chinatown Gateway =

Paifang and sculpture in Portland, Oregon, U.S.

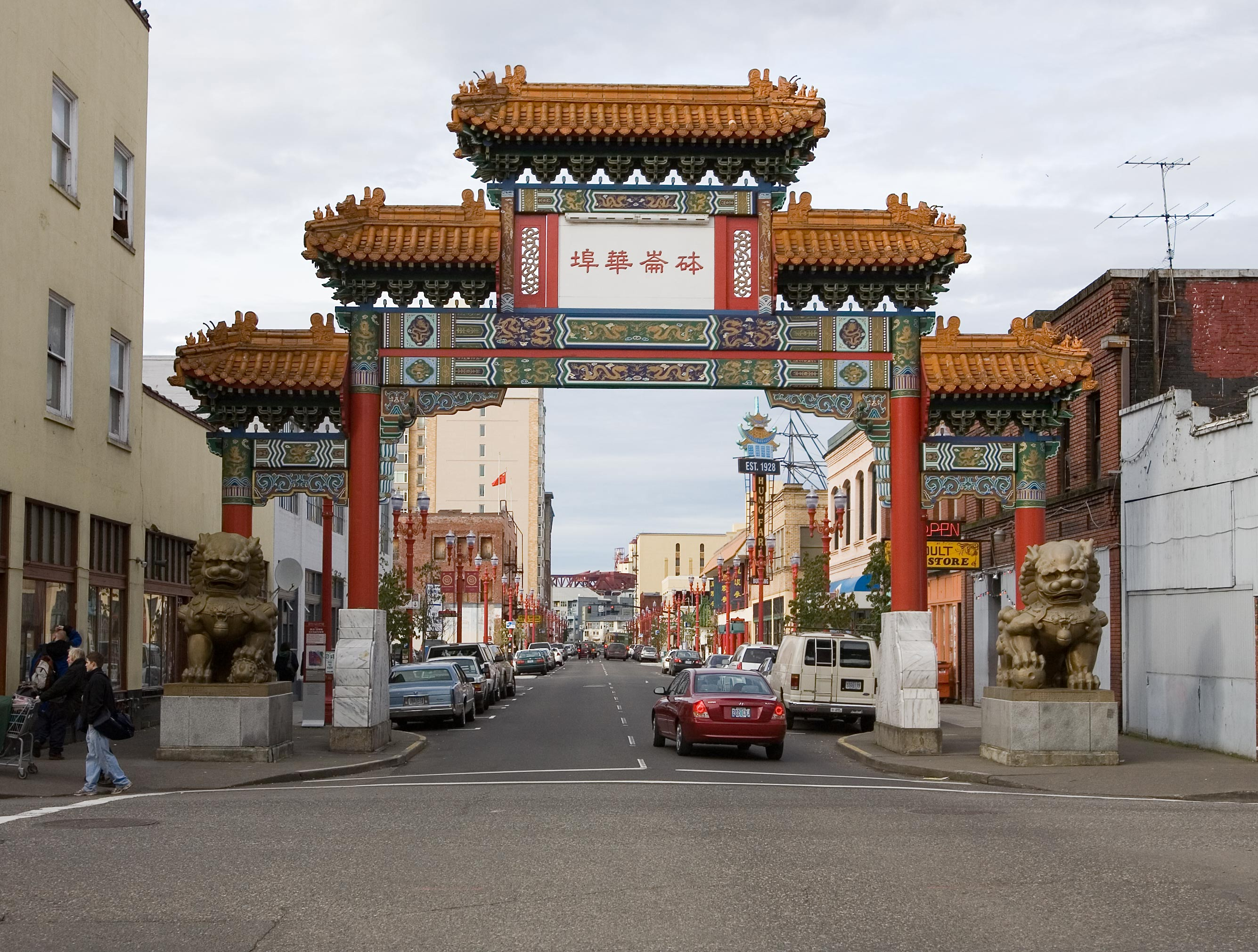
- The gate in 2007
- Artist: Yu Tang Wang, architect; Sun Chau, artist
- Year: November 1986
- Type: Paifang; sculpture
- Medium: Bronze; marble granite; wood; tile; steel
- Dimensions: 12 m (38 ft)
- Location: Portland, Oregon, United States; 45.5233°N 122.6744°W

Chinatown Gateway is an outdoor paifang and sculpture which serves as an entrance to Portland, Oregon's Old Town Chinatown neighborhood, in the United States. The gate was proposed by the Chinese Consolidated Benevolent Association in 1984. Architect Yu Tang Wang and artist Sun Chau completed the gate's design, which was built by Ting Hwa Architects in Taiwan. It was then shipped to Portland and installed in one week before being dedicated in November 1986. It cost $256,000 and was the largest of its kind in the United States until one in Washington, D.C. was completed several months later.

== Description ==
Chinatown Gateway is located at the intersection of West Burnside Street and Northwest Fourth Avenue and serves as the official entrance to Portland's Old Town Chinatown neighborhood. It is 38 feet (12 m) tall and made of bronze, marble, granite, wood, tile and steel. The gate features depictions of 78 dragons and 58 mythical characters. Chinese letters on the front and back read "Portland Chinatown" and "Four Seas, One Family", respectively.

== History ==
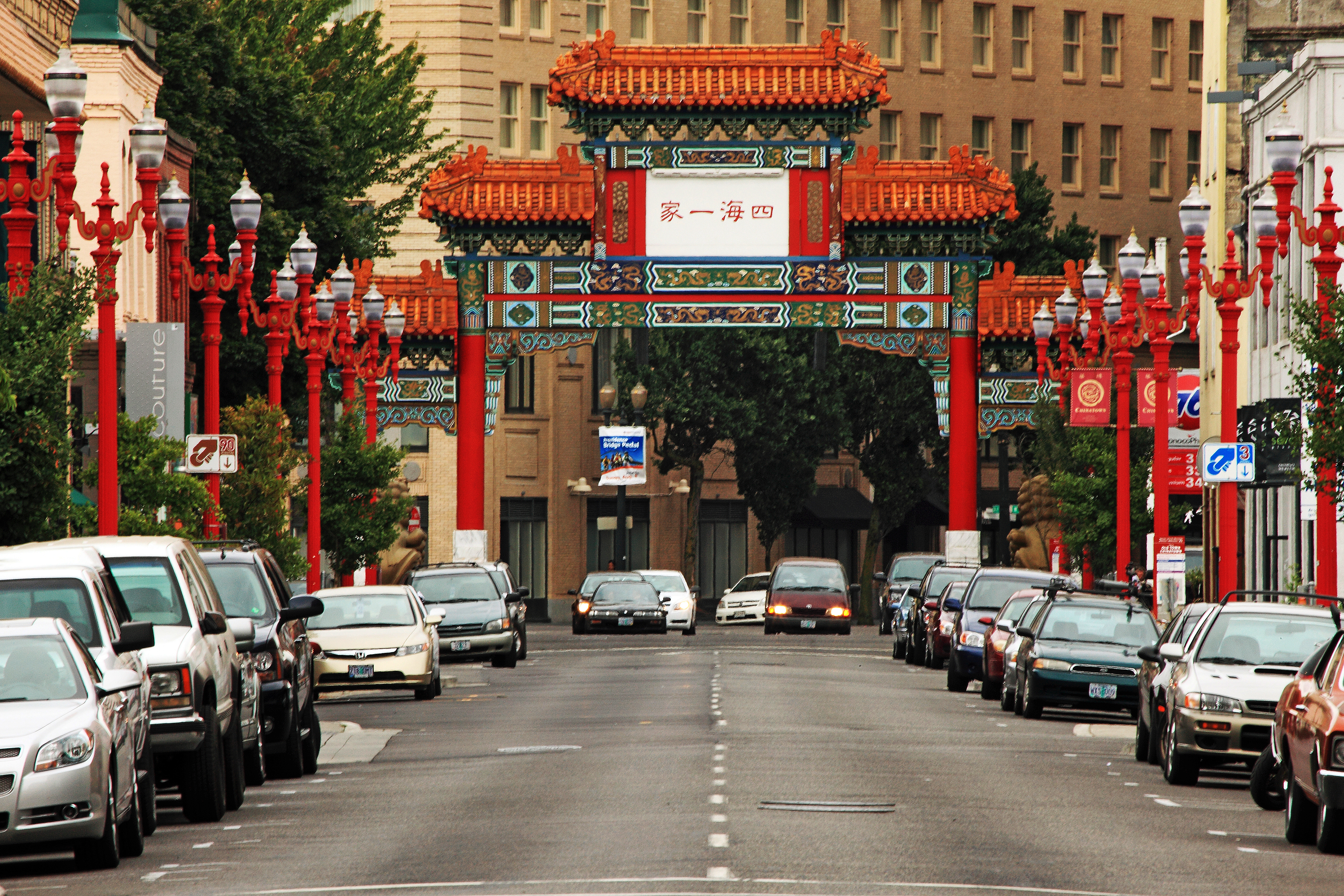
The gate's reverse side in 2010

In 1984, the Chinese Consolidated Benevolent Association proposed construction of a paifang, or gate. Architect Yu Tang Wang and artist Sun Chau completed a design. The gate was built by Ting Hwa Architects in Taiwan, then shipped to Portland and installed in one week. It was dedicated in November 1986 and presented to the City of Portland as "gesture of goodwill from the Chinese community". The gate cost $256,000 and was the largest in the country until one in Washington, D.C. was completed several months later. Harlan Luck, who served as the structural engineer, built the gate's foundation underground as well as the marble platforms that support two bronze lion statues. One lion is male and the other is female, representing yin and yang.

In 2011, an organization called Friends of Portland Chinatown held a ceremony to commemorate the gate's twenty-fifth anniversary.

== See also ==
- 1986 in art
- Chinese architecture
- History of Chinese Americans in Portland, Oregon
