= PAE Living Building =

Building in Portland, Oregon, U.S.

General information
- Location: Portland, Oregon, United States
- Coordinates: 45°31′17″N 122°40′19″W

The PAE Living Building is a commercial building in Portland, Oregon.

Located at Southwest 1st Avenue and Pine Street, the five-story "Living Building" was designed by ZGF Architects. In April 2024 it gained full Living Building certification from the International Living Future Institute, making it Portland's first fully certified Living Building, and the world's 35th. The certification of the Living Building Challenge is the most rigorous sustainability standard for the built environment, requiring a year-long performance period.

The PAE Living Building produces over 100% of its annual energy use through solar panels and a battery storage system, and treats rainwater onsite for 100% of water needs, including drinking water. It also utilizes composting toilets to minimize waste.
