= Portland Chinatown Museum =

Museum in Portland, Oregon, U.S.

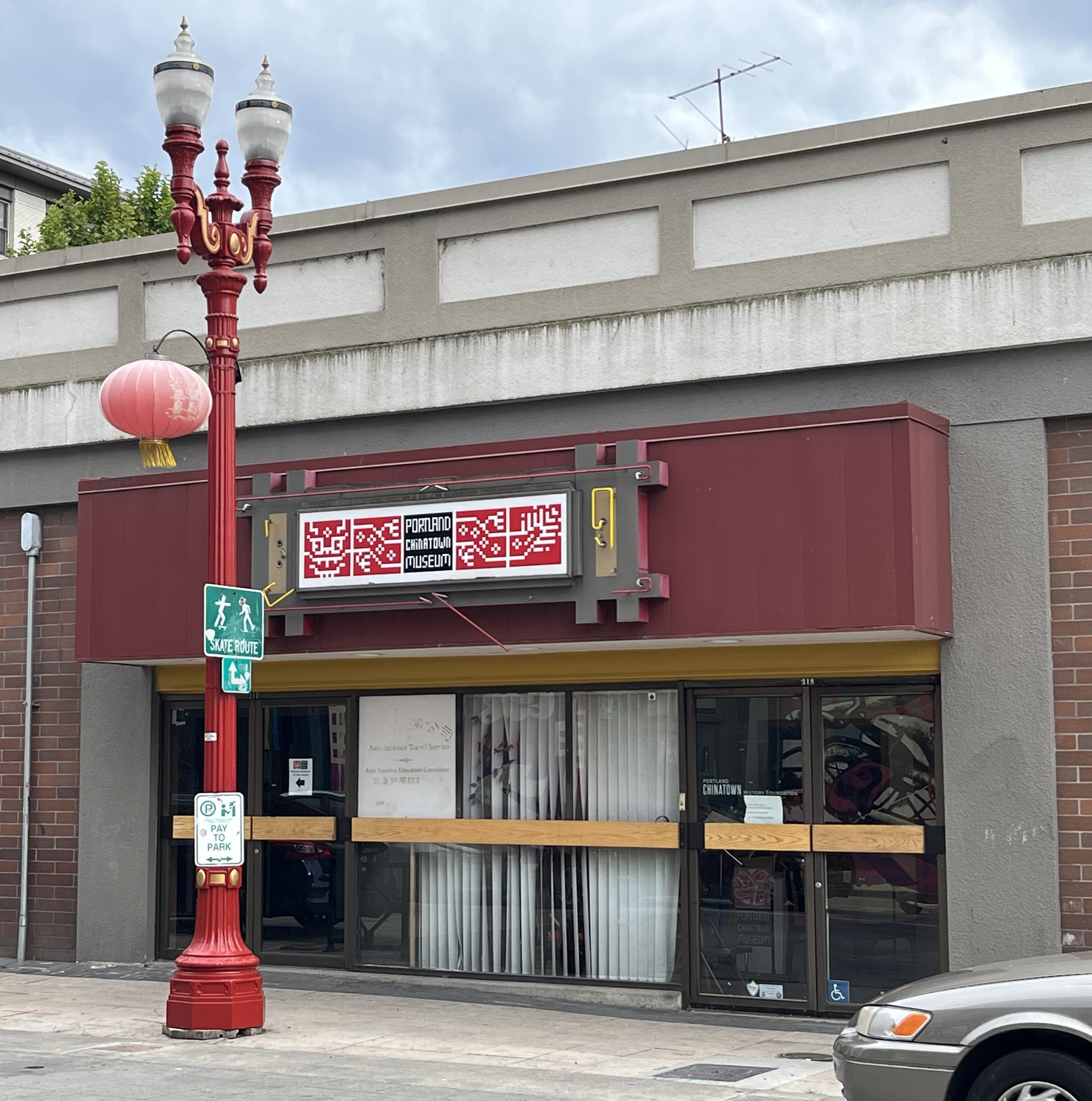
- The museum's exterior, 2025
- Established: 2018
- Location: 127 Northwest Third Avenue, Portland, Oregon, U.S.
- Coordinates: 45°31′27.4″N 122°40′25.2″W
- Executive director: Anna Truxes
- Website: portlandchinatownmuseum.org

The Portland Chinatown Museum is a museum showcasing the Chinese immigrant experience, located in Portland, Oregon's Old Town Chinatown neighborhood, in the United States. The museum opened in 2018, with Jackie Peterson-Loomis serving as the executive director. Anna Truxes is the current executive director.

== See also ==
- Culture of Portland, Oregon
- History of Chinese Americans in Portland, Oregon
- List of museums in Portland, Oregon
