= One Pacific Square =

Building in Portland, Oregon, U.S.

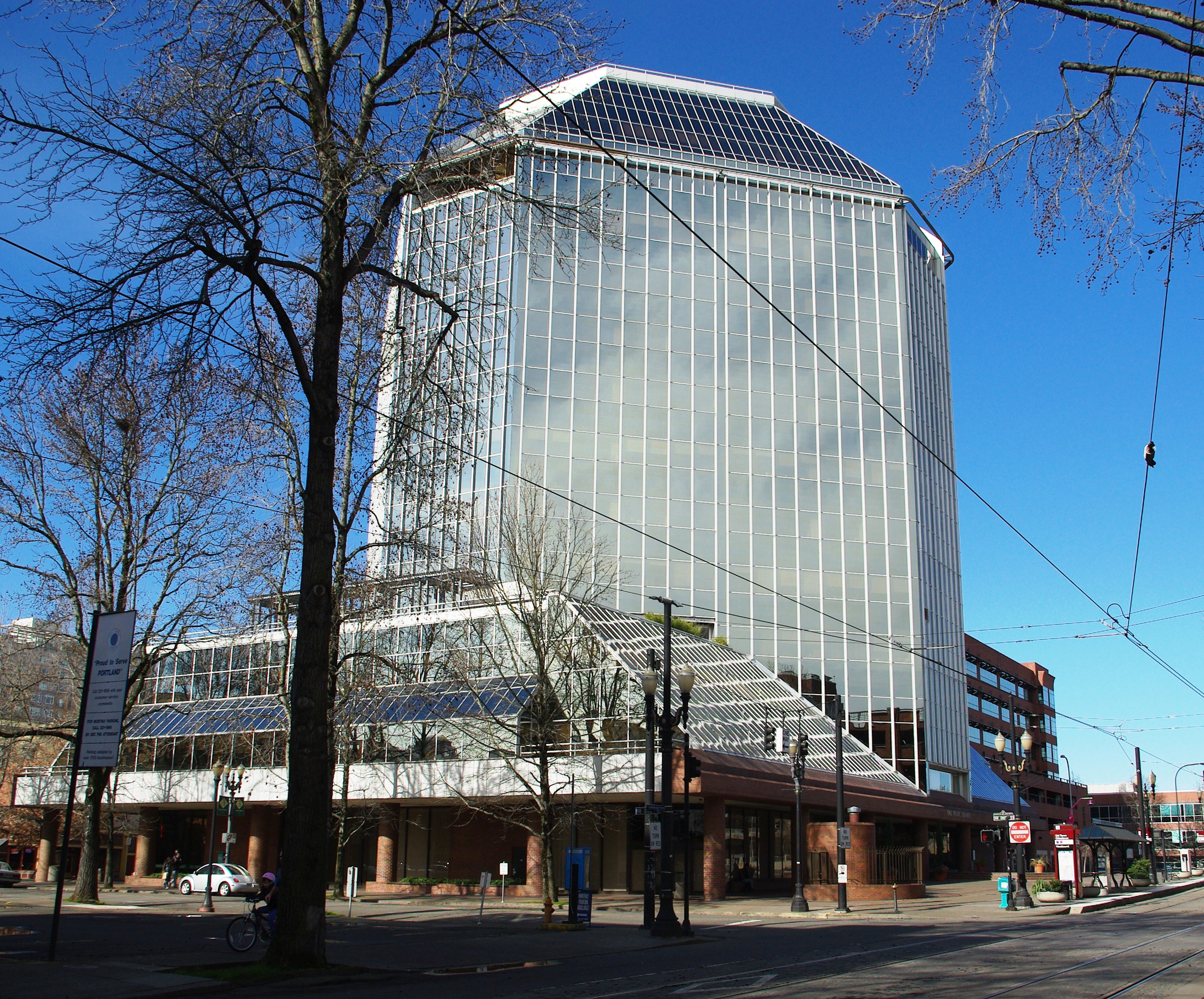
- The building in 2011

- Location within Portland, Oregon

General information
- Type: High rise
- Location: Portland, Oregon, United States
- Coordinates: 45.525°N 122.672°W
- Current tenants: NW Natural
- Construction started: July 1981
- Topped-out: June 1982
- Opened: April 1, 1983
- Cost: $23 million

Height
- Height: 188 feet (57 m)

Technical details
- Floor count: 13

Design and construction
- Architect: Richard A. Campbell
- Developer: Hayden Corp.
- Main contractor: H.A. Andersen

One Pacific Square, also known as the Northwest Natural Gas Building, is a high-rise building located at 220 Northwest 2nd Avenue in Portland, Oregon, United States. Construction was completed in 1983. According to Bart King's An Architectural Guidebook to Portland, it has been nicknamed the "R2-D2 Building".

== History ==
Planning for the structure began in 1974, with construction beginning in July 1981, with plans for completion in December 1982 for the $23-million project. It had received a height variance for the neighborhood, as it was to be 14-stories and 188-foot (57 m) tall. The building was designed by architect Richard A. Campbell, developed by Hayden Corp., and built by general contractor H.A. Andersen (now Andersen Construction Co). It was to be part of a four-building complex of similar towers, one to be 20 stories, one at 27 stories, and the tallest at 28 stories. A dedication ceremony was held on April 8, 1982 for the building, at which time a time capsule was buried. It topped out in June 1982. One Pacific opened on April 1, 1983, with an opening ceremony on July 11, 1983, and at that time NW Natural leased approximately 55 percent of the building.

One Pacific was sold in 1997 for $33 million to Equity Office Properties Trust, and then sold for $48 million to Ashforth-Pacific Inc. in August 2006. The building attained Energy Star certification in 2007. Menlo Equities purchased the property in 2015 for $48.5 million. In 2017, NW Natural announced plans to move out when the company's lease expires in 2020, after using the building as its headquarters for 30 years. NW Natural then moved in 2020 to 250 Taylor in Downtown. Owner Menlo sold the tower for $52.1 million in 2018.

== Details ==
The eight-sided tower is crystal-shaped, with the upper floors at a 45-degree angle. Standing 13-stories, it occupies the entire block bounded by Davis, Everett, First, and Second in Northwest Portland. The building contains 230,000 square feet (21,000 m^{2}) of space inside a glass envelope.
