= Red leaf lettuce =

Group of lettuce cultivars with red leaves

lechuga violeta
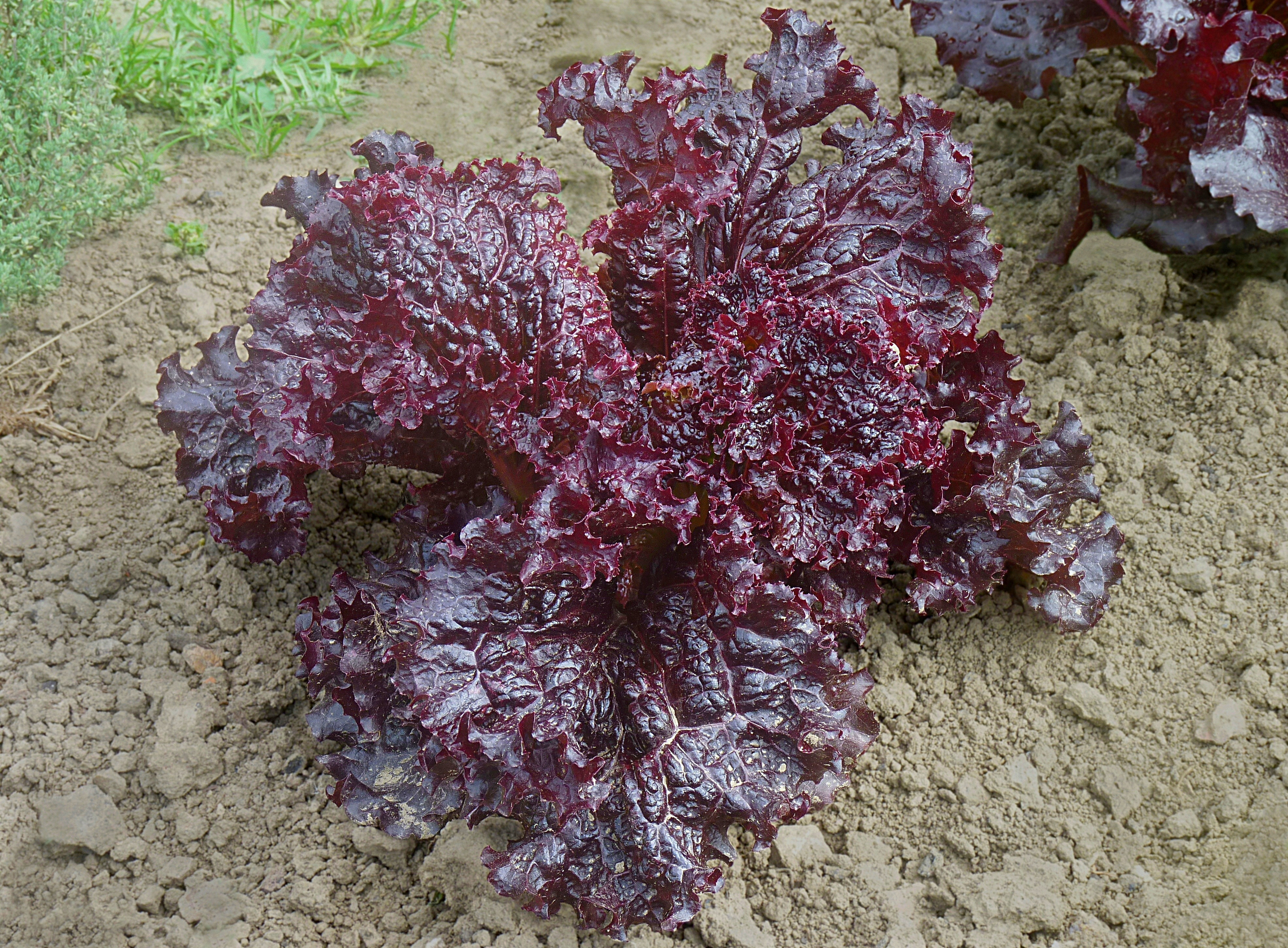
- New Red Fire Lettuce, one of the cultivars of the red leaf lettuce group.
- Species: Lactuca sativa

Red leaf lettuce, raw
Nutritional value per 100 g (3.5 oz)
- Energy: 68 kJ (16 kcal)
- Carbohydrates: 2.26 g
- Sugars: 0.48 g
- Dietary fiber: 0.9 g
- Fat: 0.22 g
- Protein: 1.33 g
Vitamins and minerals
| Vitamins | Quantity %DV^{†} |
| Vitamin A equiv. beta-Carotene lutein zeaxanthin | 42% 375 μg 42% 4495 μg 1724 μg |
| Thiamine (B1) | 5% 0.064 mg |
| Riboflavin (B2) | 6% 0.077 mg |
| Niacin (B3) | 2% 0.321 mg |
| Pantothenic acid (B5) | 3% 0.144 mg |
| Vitamin B6 | 6% 0.1 mg |
| Folate (B9) | 9% 36 μg |
| Vitamin C | 4% 3.7 mg |
| Vitamin E | 1% 0.15 mg |
| Vitamin K | 117% 140.3 μg |
| Minerals | Quantity %DV^{†} |
| Calcium | 3% 33 mg |
| Iron | 7% 1.2 mg |
| Magnesium | 3% 12 mg |
| Manganese | 9% 0.203 mg |
| Phosphorus | 2% 28 mg |
| Potassium | 6% 187 mg |
| Sodium | 1% 25 mg |
| Zinc | 2% 0.2 mg |
- Link to USDA Database entry
- ^{†}Percentages estimated using US recommendations for adults, except for potassium, which is estimated based on expert recommendation from the National Academies.

Red leaf lettuces are a group of lettuce cultivars with dark red or purple leaves. Red leaf lettuce cultivars include "Lollo Rossa", "Lolla Rosa"/"Lolla Rossa", "New Red Fire Lettuce", "Red Sails Lettuce", "Redina Lettuce", "Henry's Leafy Friend", "Galactic Lettuce", and the "Benito Lettuce".
