= Oregon Cracker Company Building =

Historic building in Portland, Oregon, U.S.

- U.S. National Register of Historic Places
- Portland Historic Landmark
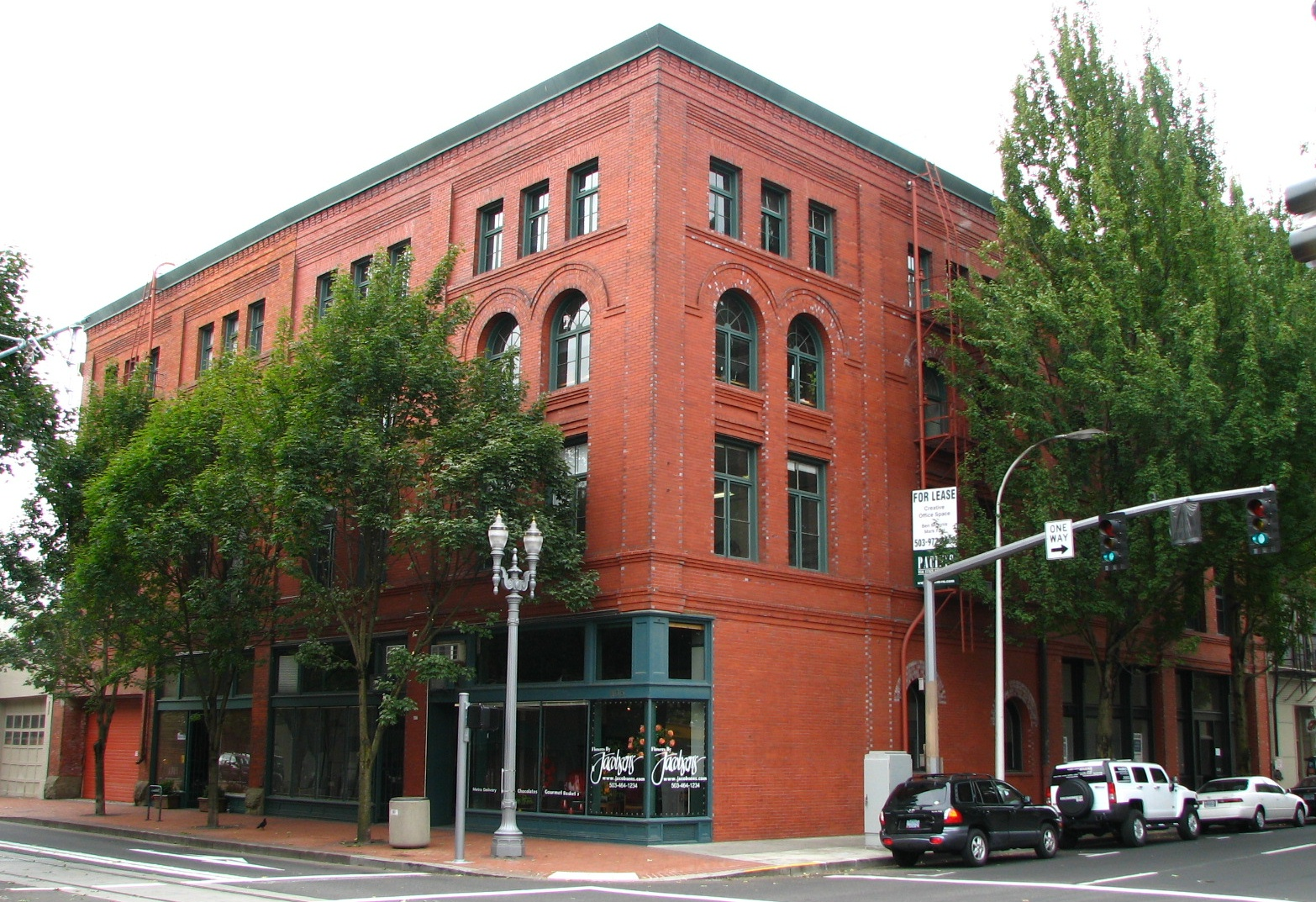
- The building's exterior, 2008

- Location within Portland, Oregon
- Location: 616 NW Glisan Street, Portland, Oregon
- Coordinates: 45°31′35″N 122°40′37″W
- Built: c. 1897 (expanded 1901)
- Architectural style: Richardsonian Romanesque
- NRHP reference No.: 79002138
- Added to NRHP: August 10, 1979

The Oregon Cracker Company Building is a historic structure located in Portland, Oregon, United States. Built around 1897 as a food processing plant, and expanded in 1901, it is one of Portland's finest Romanesque Revival buildings. The building also includes early examples of structural features that were innovative for the time, but which later became common. The building was added to the National Register of Historic Places in 1979.

== See also ==
- National Register of Historic Places listings in Northwest Portland, Oregon
