= Fong Chong =

Defunct grocery and restaurant in Portland, Oregon, U.S.

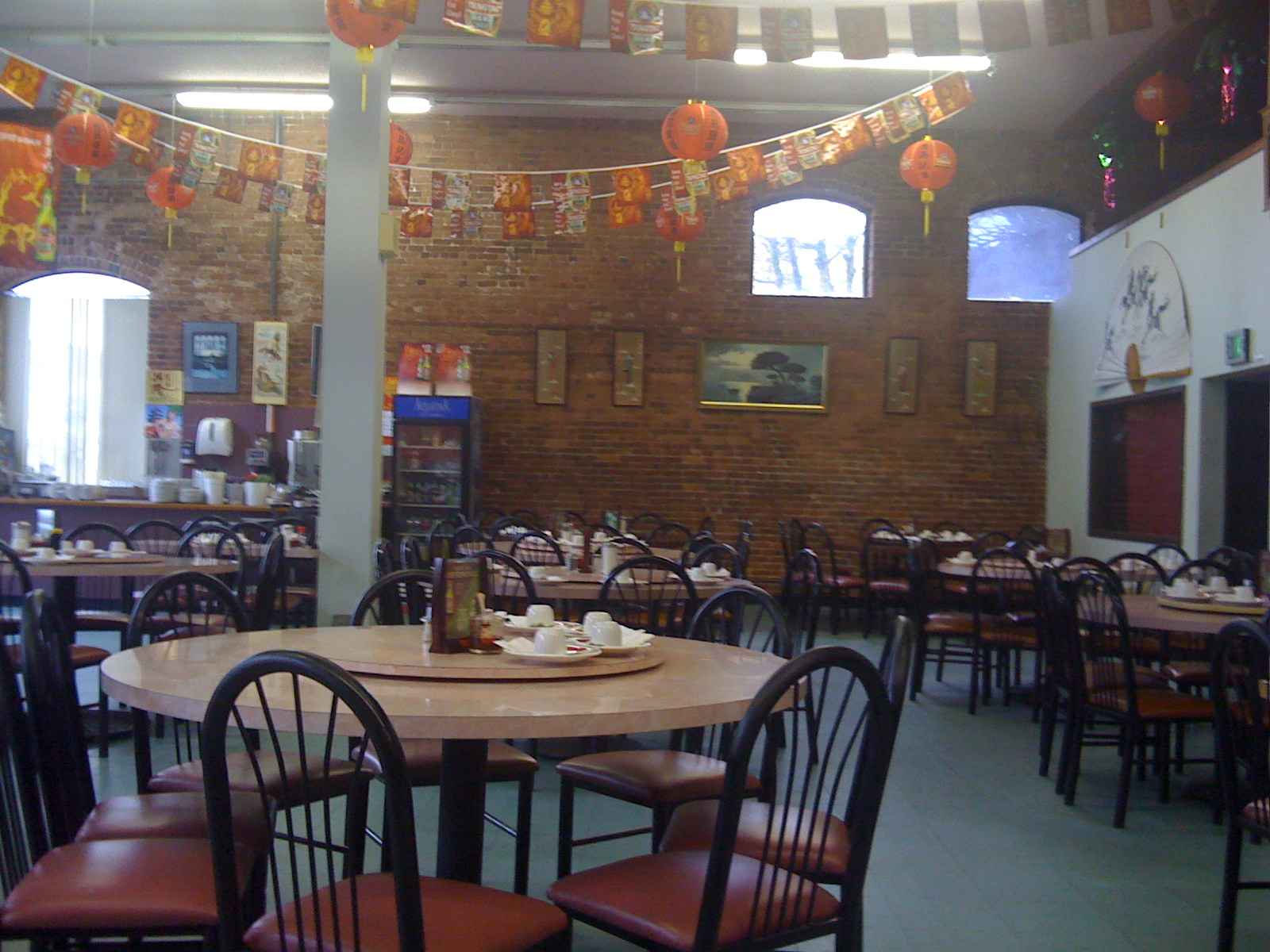
- The interior of the restaurant
- Interactive map of Fong Chong

Restaurant information
- Food type: Asian; Chinese
- Location: 301 Northwest 4th Avenue, Portland, Multnomah, Oregon, United States
- Coordinates: 45.5253°N 122.6746°W

Fong Chong was a family-owned grocery store and restaurant in Old Town Chinatown, Portland, Oregon.

== Description and history ==
The business opened in 1954 and initially operated as a grocery store, carrying Asian food products such as dried banana flowers, fish bladders, and instant noodles. Fong Chong became a restaurant in 1979. The menu featured barbecue (including ribs), dim sum, hom bao, glutinous rice in lotus leaves, and chicken feet. Fong Chong closed in May 2014.

The building which housed Fong Chong (301 Northwest Fourth Avenue) was constructed in 1905.

== Reception ==
In 2013, Erin DeJesus included Fong Chong in Eater Portland's list of "Portland's Biggest Guilty Pleasure Restaurants". In his 2016 overview of "97 long-gone Portland restaurants we wish were still around", Grant Butler of The Oregonian said, "This longtime Chinatown restaurant was never much to look at, but in the 1980s and ‘90s, this was the place to go for some of the city’s best dim sum."

== See also ==
- List of Chinese restaurants
