= Central Waterfront, Seattle =

Neighborhood in Seattle

Central Waterfront, Seattle dᶻidᶻəlal̕ič
- Seattle Neighborhood
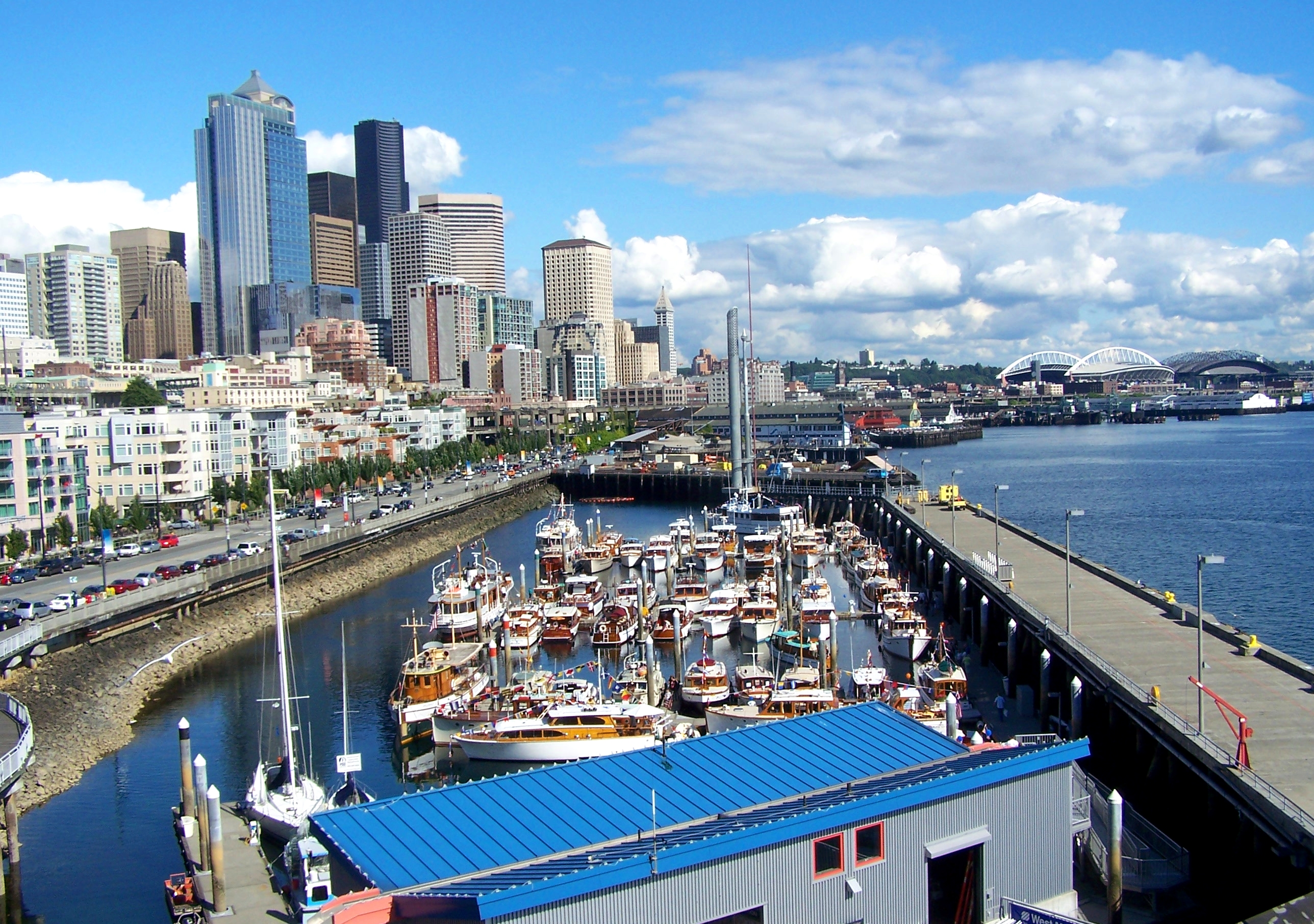
- Southeast view of the Central Waterfront from the Bell Street Terminal in 2006.

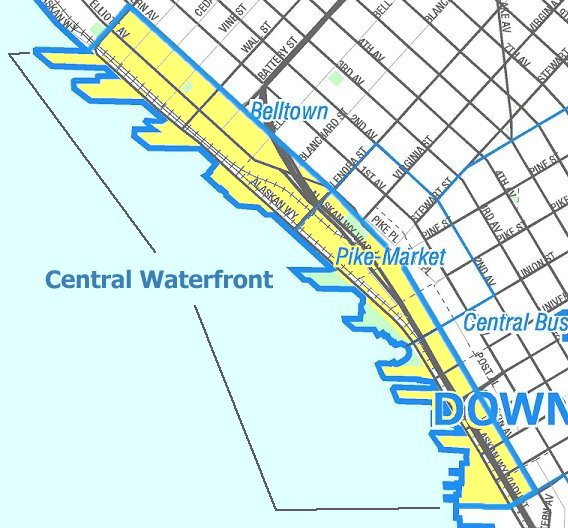
- Unofficial boundary map of the Central Waterfront
- Coordinates: 47°36′23″N 122°20′23″W
- Country: United States
- State: Washington
- County: King
- City: Seattle
- ZIP Code: 98101
- Area code: 206, 564

The Central Waterfront is a neighborhood of Seattle, Washington. It is the most urbanized portion of the Elliott Bay shore. It runs from the Pioneer Square shore roughly northwest past Downtown Seattle and Belltown, ending at the Broad Street site of the Olympic Sculpture Park.

The Central Waterfront was once the hub of Seattle's maritime activity. Since the construction of a container port to its south in the 1960s, the area has increasingly been converted to recreational and retail uses. As of 2008, several century-old piers are devoted to shops and restaurants. There are several parks, a Ferris wheel, an aquarium, and one over-water hotel.

Some docks remain on the Central Waterfront, under the authority of the Port of Seattle, including a cruise ship dock, ferry terminals, and a fireboat dock. There are many architectural vestiges of the area's past status as the heart of a port, and a handful of businesses have remained in operation since that time.

== Location and extent ==
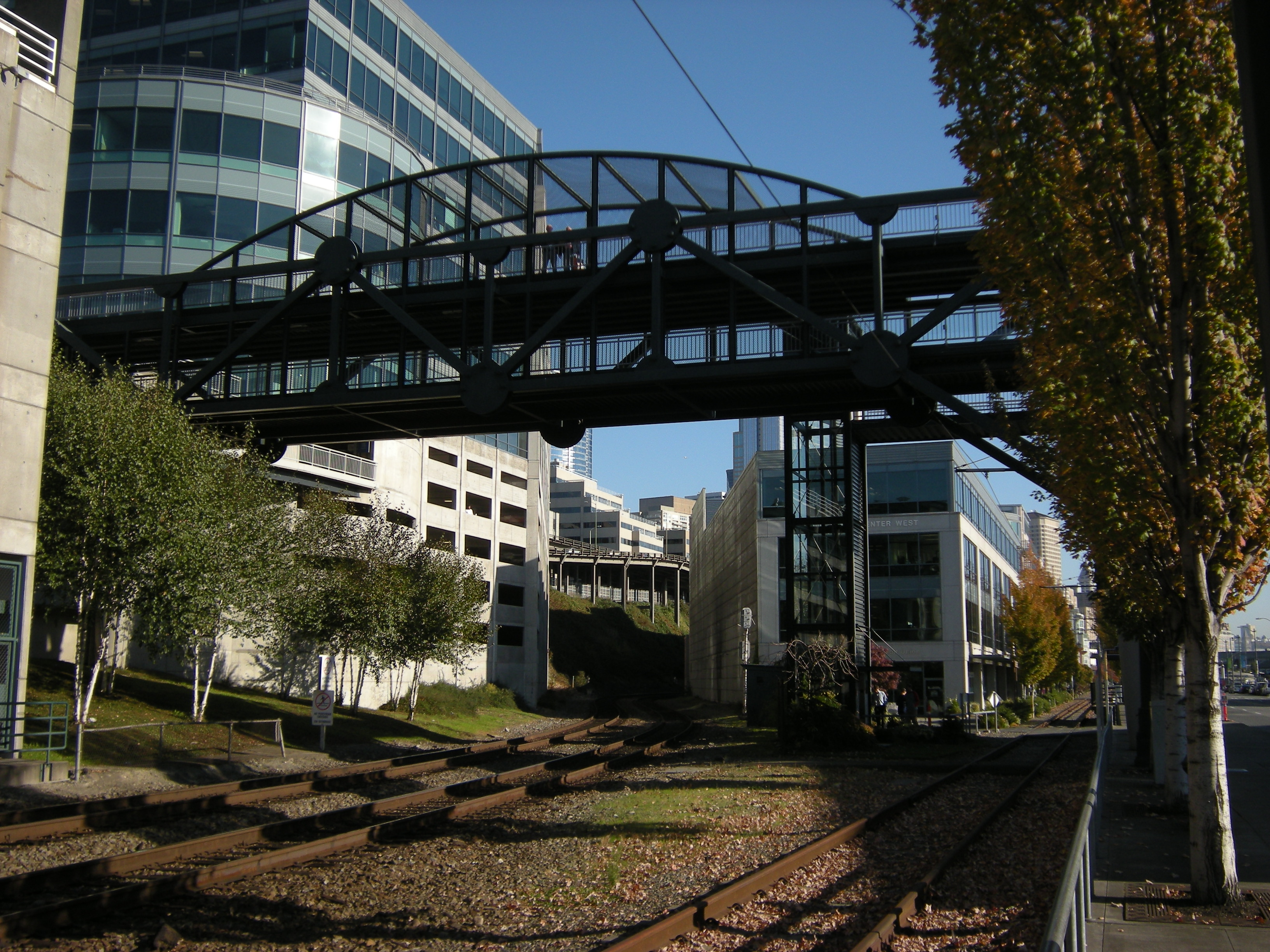
Part of the Bell Street Bridge, spanning railroad and trolley tracks. To the right, the footbridge continues across Alaskan Way to Pier 66. The 2006 Department of Neighborhoods definition includes all of this in the Central Waterfront; other definitions exclude it or are ambiguous about the matter.

As with most Seattle neighborhoods, the Central Waterfront has no defined and agreed-upon boundaries. According to the Seattle Waterfront Plan, the Central Waterfront runs roughly from Jackson Street in the Pioneer Square neighborhood, north along the Elliott Bay shore through Downtown to Broad Street, near the north end of Belltown. To its south is the Port of Seattle's container port; to its north is the Olympic Sculpture Park. That plan makes no clear statement as to how far inland the "waterfront" neighborhood might extend.

Real estate and consulting firm Wronsky, Gibbons & Riely PLLC describe the Central Waterfront as a "predominately linear district running north-south along Alaskan Way" from Pier 48 to Pier 70. Pier 48 is at the foot of Yesler Way, three blocks north of Jackson Street (the city plan's southern boundary); Pier 70 is at the foot of Broad Street.

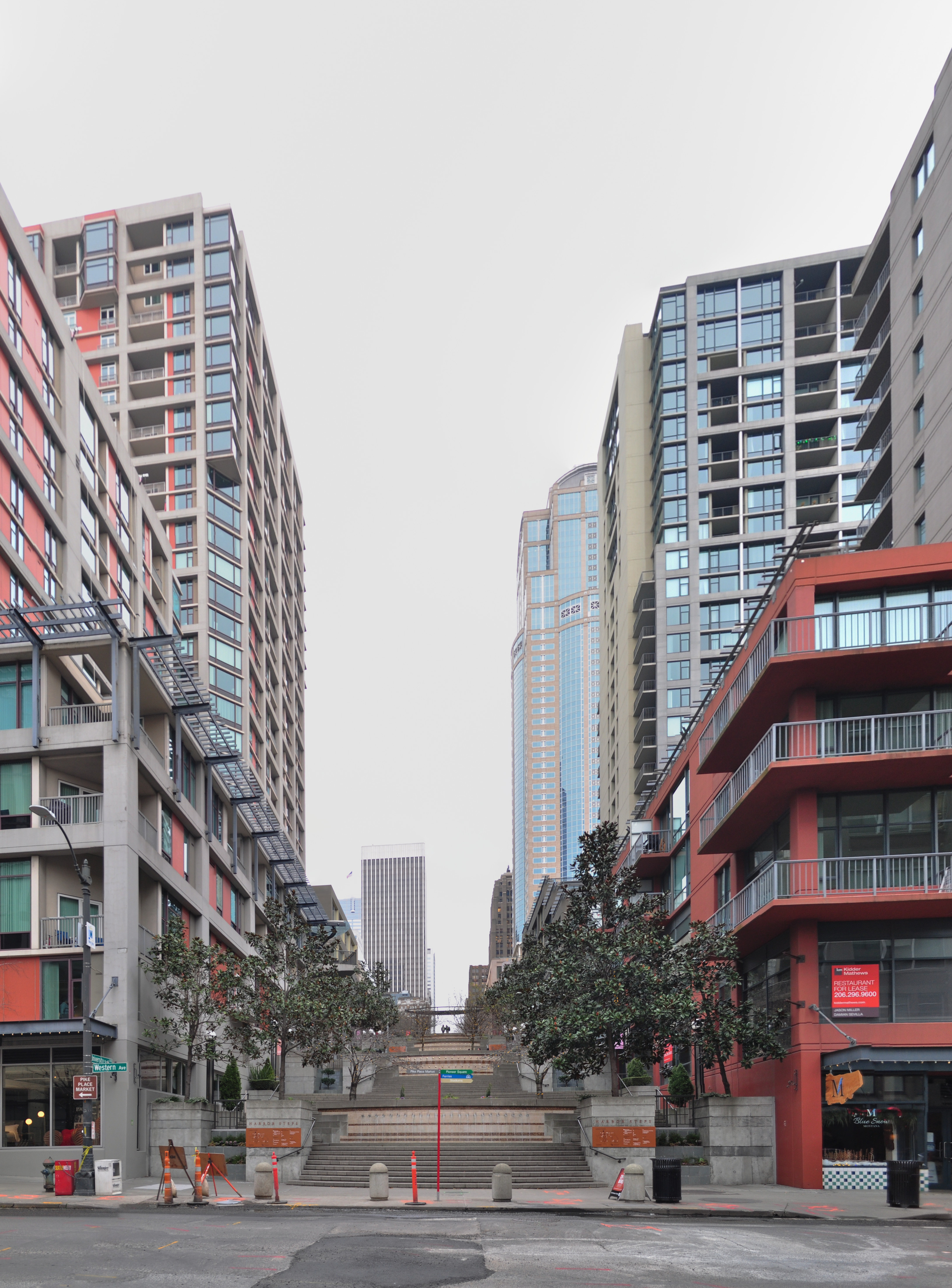
Harbor Steps, 2016

A 2006 study by the Department of Neighborhoods agrees on where to place the north end of the district, but puts its southern boundary at Columbia Street (a block north of Yesler Way at the water's edge). Below Battery Street, this study considers the neighborhood to extend inland to First Avenue. Above Battery Street, they consider the neighborhood to extend only to Elliott Avenue, taking in facilities such as the World Trade Center. The southern cutoff at Columbia Street completely excludes the Pioneer Square neighborhood, while the extension inland to First Avenue means that they consider the former warehouse district along Western Avenue and the entire Pike Place Market Historical District as part of the Central Waterfront.

In its southern portion, the waterfront is separated from inland Seattle by Alaskan Way, which continues northward through downtown. As one continues north, the land rises more rapidly away from the water, creating a sharper distinction between waterfront and uplands. There are several distinct passages between the Central Waterfront and the uplands: the Harbor Steps at University Street, leading to the Seattle Art Museum; the Pike Street Hill Climb from the Seattle Aquarium to the Pike Place Market; and, farther north, the Lenora Street and Bell Street Bridges. The last two are not heavily used, because they do not connect to any major upland destination.

Historically, Seattle's Central Waterfront continued farther south, with a similar character. Since the mid-1960s, the area to the south has been a container port.

Seattle's current pier numbering scheme dates from World War II; prior to that era, for example, the present Pier 55 was Pier 4 and Pier 57 was Pier 6.

=== Roads ===
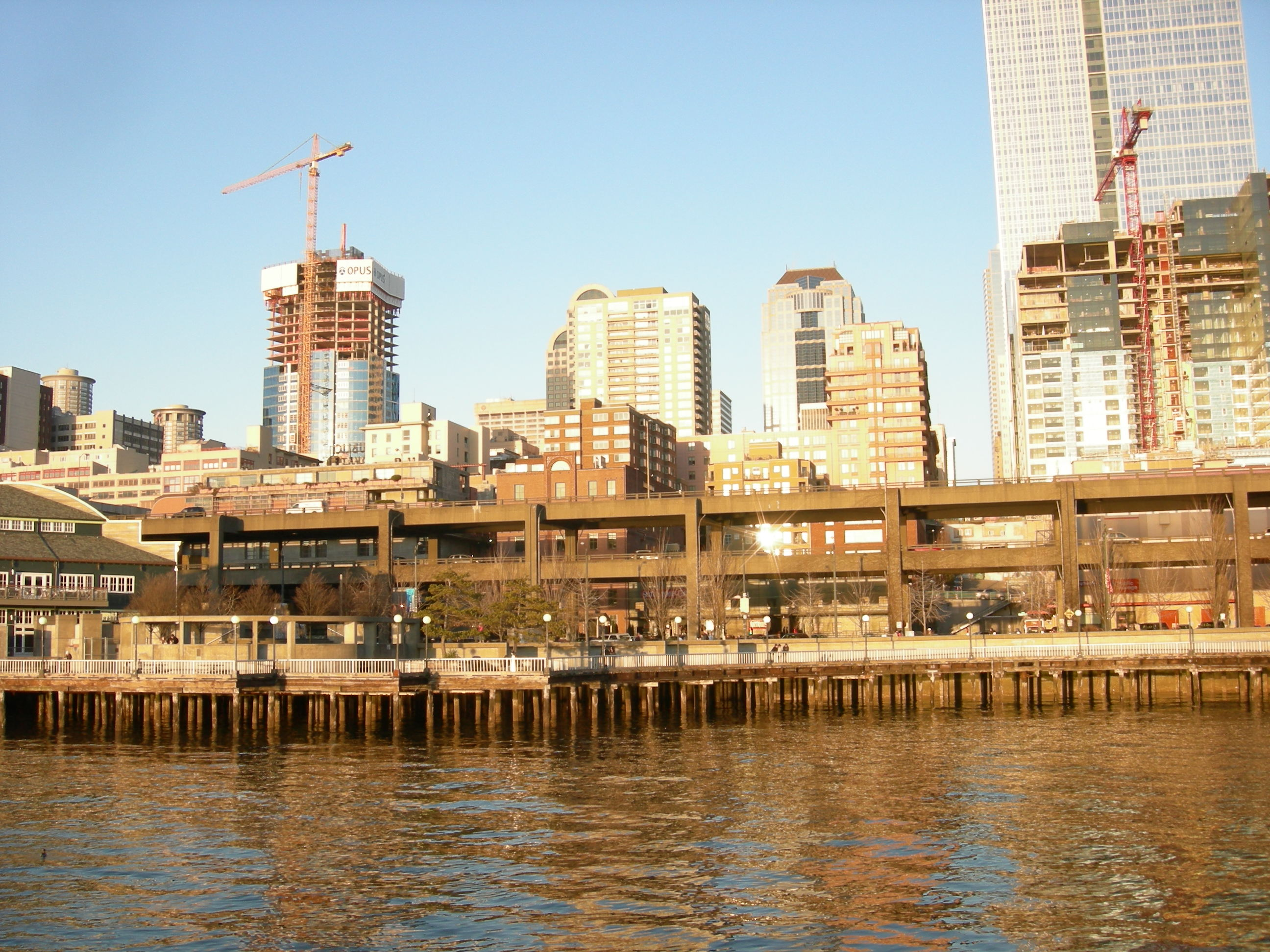
Waterfront Park and the Alaskan Way Viaduct, in 2008

As of 2020, the main route along the Central Waterfront is Alaskan Way. Alaskan Way follows the route of the earlier railway line and one-time Railroad Avenue along the "Ram's Horn" from just north of S. Holgate Street in the Industrial District to Broad Street at the north end of the Central Waterfront.

The original Railroad Avenue was built as a planked roadway on pilings over the waters of Elliott Bay. The chaos of horses and buggies, pedestrians, rail cars, multiple railroad tracks and multiple sidings was somewhat relieved when the Great Northern built a rail tunnel (1903–1906) under Downtown. From that time, only rail traffic that actually needed to access the waterfront had to use Railroad Avenue; other trains could bypass the busy corridor. Still, there continued to be problems with the structural integrity of the planked roadway. Between 1911 and 1916, a concrete seawall strengthened the portion of the waterfront between S. Washington Street and Madison Street. By 1936 the seawall extended northward to Bay Street, its current extent as of 2008, and Railroad Avenue officially became Alaskan Way. Still, it was not properly paved until 1940, during the administration of mayor Arthur B. Langlie. In the early 1950s, the Alaskan Way Viaduct was built, paralleling Alaskan Way for much of its distance. It was demolished in late 2019 after its replacement by the State Route 99 tunnel.

From May 29, 1982 to November 19, 2005, the George Benson Waterfront Streetcar Line ran parallel to Alaskan Way on the land side. The trolley barn was demolished to build the Olympic Sculpture Park, and since 2005 a roughly equivalent route has been served by a bus.

== Piers and buildings ==
The piers of Seattle's Central Waterfront are numbered from Pier 46, at the south end of the area, to Pier 70 at the northern end.

=== Piers 46–48 ===
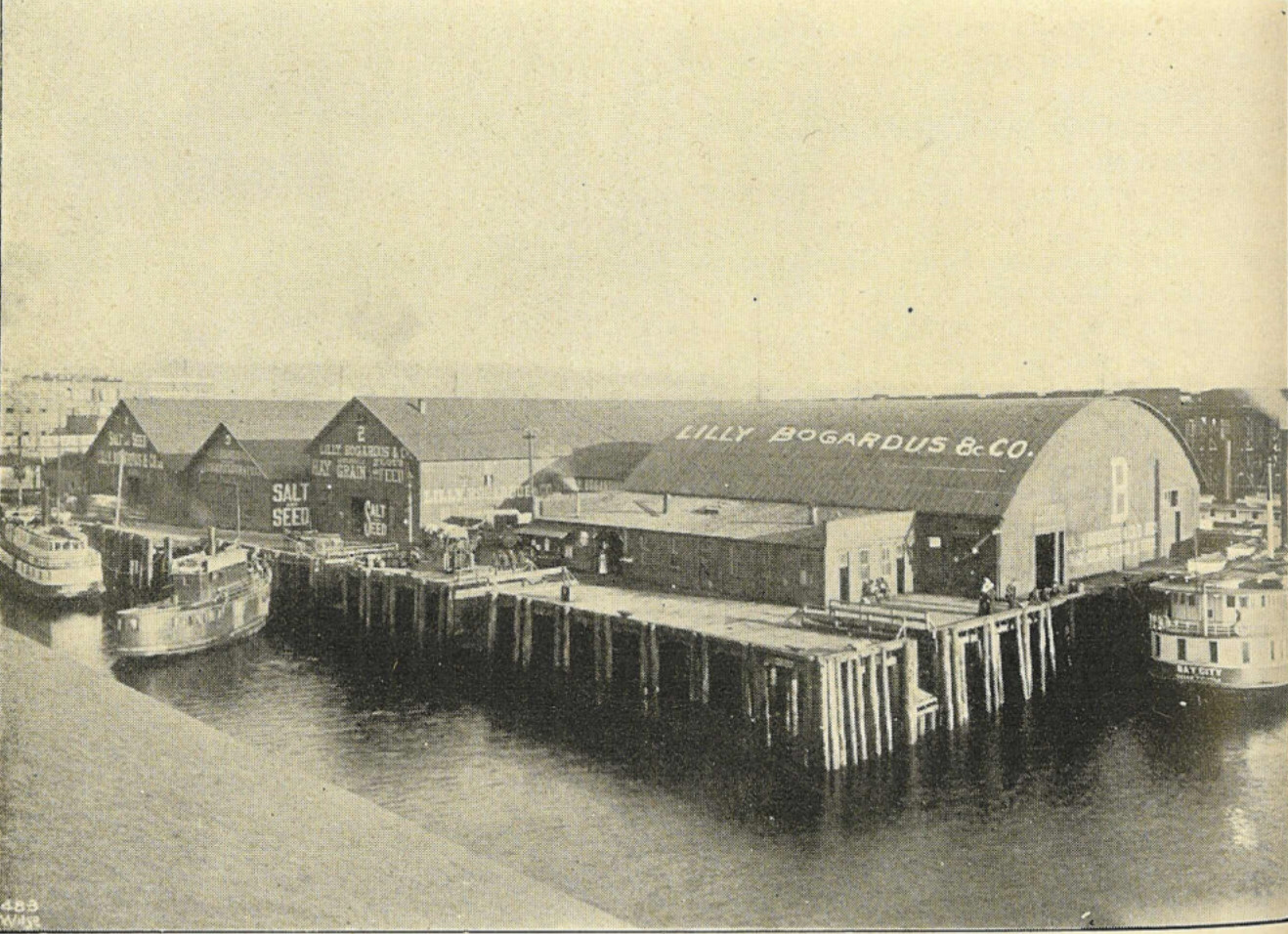
In 1900 the Lilly Bogardus warehouse stood on Oregon Improvement Company Pier B near the site of today's Pier 48.

Pier 46, 88 acres (360,000 m^{2}) and land filled, is the southernmost pier on the Central Waterfront and the northernmost pier of the Port of Seattle's container port. For two years in the early 2000s part of it was operated by the Church Council as a homeless shelter. South Korean container shipping company Hanjin Shipping has a lease at the pier through 2015 with a 10-year renewal option. Nonetheless, there has been much discussion about the future of Pier 46. Proposals have included a sports arena, mixed-income or low-income housing, condos and a shopping center, or continued use as part of the port.

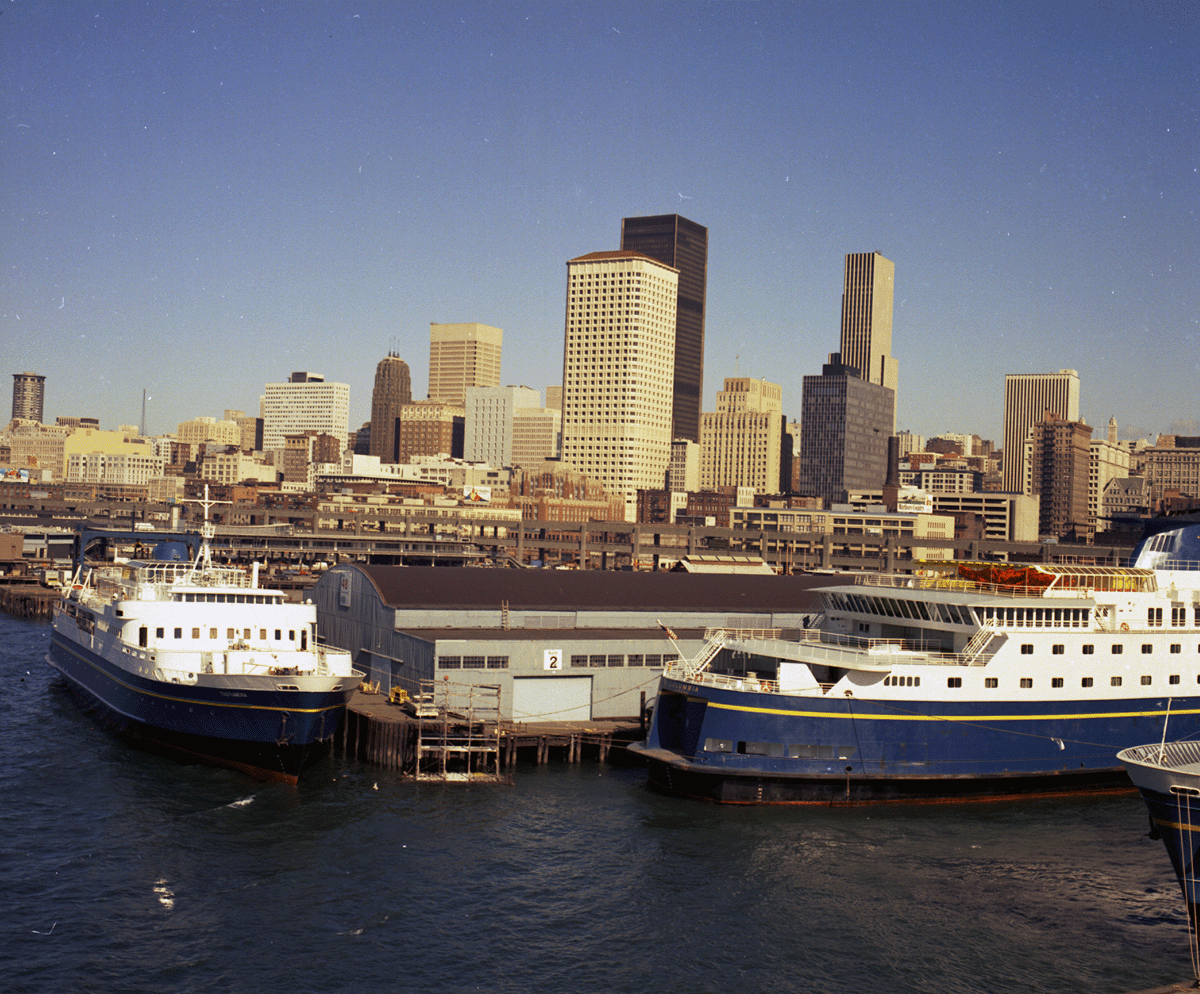
Alaska ferries at Pier 48 in 1975

Pier 48, at the foot of Main Street, also incorporates the former Pier 47. Nirvana, Cypress Hill and the Breeders performed a concert at Pier 48 on December 13, 1993, which was recorded for MTV. Until 1999, the pier was the Seattle terminal for a ferry service to Victoria, British Columbia using the ship Princess Marguerite. After the final departure of the Princess Marguerite, Pier 48 became home to a museum ship, the Soviet-era Foxtrot class submarine Cobra. The Washington State Department of Transportation (WSDOT) purchased the pier from the Port of Seattle in 2008. Citing safety and the expense of maintaining the buildings on the worm-eaten pier, WSDOT demolished the 120,000-square-foot (11,000 m^{2}) warehouse on the pier in July 2010 in order to use the space as a staging area for the coming demolition of the nearby Alaskan Way Viaduct.

Piers 46–48 are roughly in the area once occupied by Ballast Island. Pier 48 began life in 1901 as Pier B of the Pacific Coast Company's Ocean Dock, which also had two other piers (A and C, the latter also known as City Dock). In the early 20th century, there was a terminal here for the Columbia and Puget Sound Railroad.

=== Harbor Entrance Pergola ===
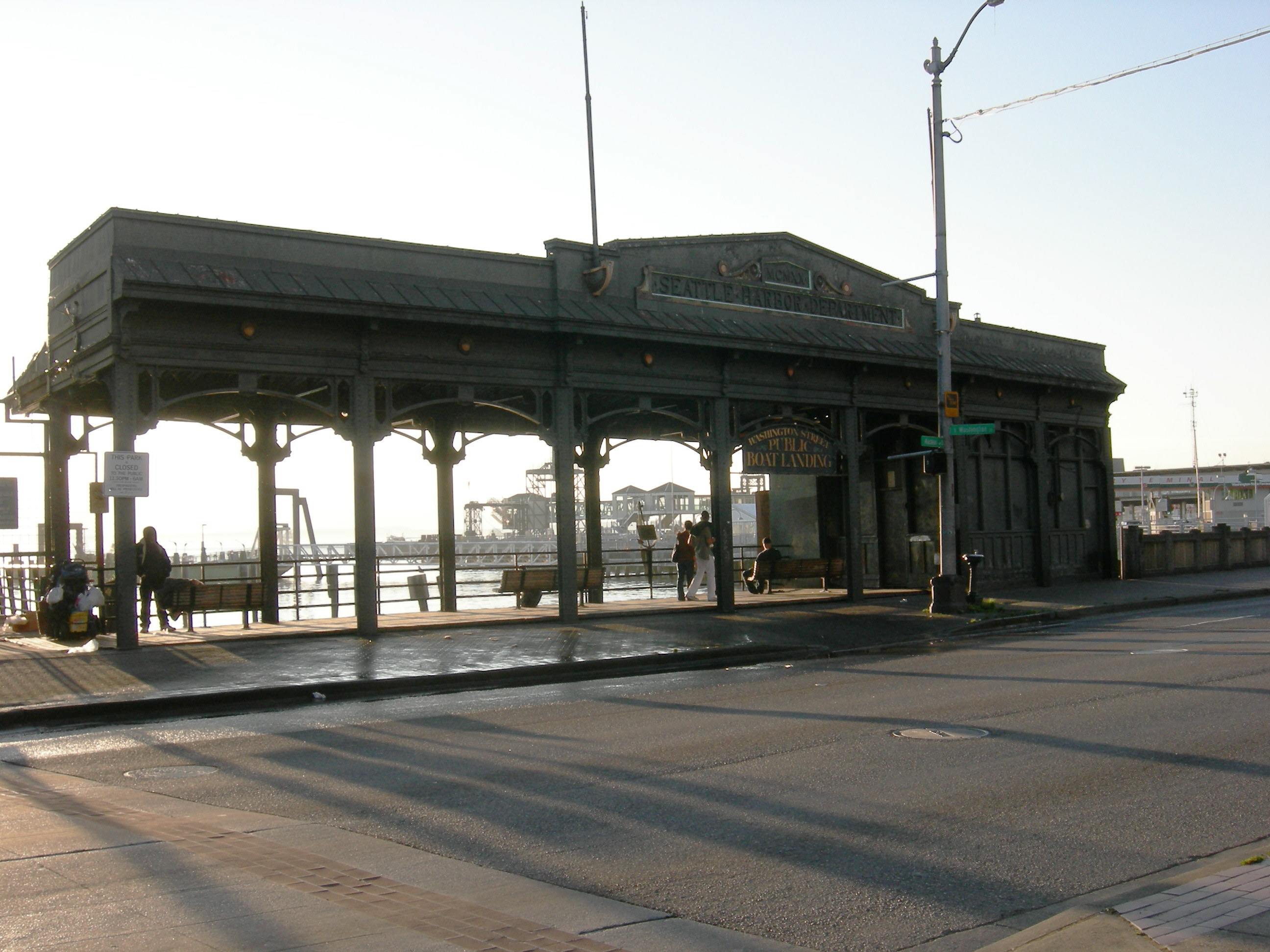
Harbor Entrance Pergola

As of 2008 there is no Pier 49 as such; the site used to be the Washington Street Boat Landing, but is closed off and unused. This was roughly the site of both the pre-fire and post-fire Yesler's Wharf and of Piers 1 and 2, built by the Northern Pacific some time between 1901 (when the post-fire Yesler's Wharf was demolished) and 1904. The one prominent remaining feature of the crumbling wharf is the Harbor Entrance Pergola, which is listed on the National Register of Historic Places. Originally it functioned as a landing point for boats bringing passengers from ships. Over the years since the boat landing was closed, various uses have been proposed, including a terminal for the King County Water Taxi route to West Seattle or a mooring point for the historic tugboat Arthur Foss.

On September 26, 2010, a water taxi carrying 78 passengers failed to reverse its engines and slammed into the pier. 7 were injured.

As of 2013, the site hosts the maintenance and moorage barge for the King County Metro water taxi.

In 2025, Molly_Moon's_Homemade_Ice_Cream opened in the pergola.

The Harbor Entrance Pergola was the last-constructed of the historic structures associated with Seattle's Pioneer Square district, and is the district's only important landmark on the west side of Alaskan Way. It was designed by Seattle City Architect Daniel Riggs Huntington and built in 1920. Huntington was also co-architect of the nearby Morrison Hotel (1909) and was responsible for the 1912 repairs to Colman Dock on the site of the present ferry terminal. Huntington also designed the Lake Union Steam Plant, built in 1914. The pergola was restored in the 1970s by the Committee of 33, a local Seattle philanthropic organization.

=== Washington State Ferry Terminal ===
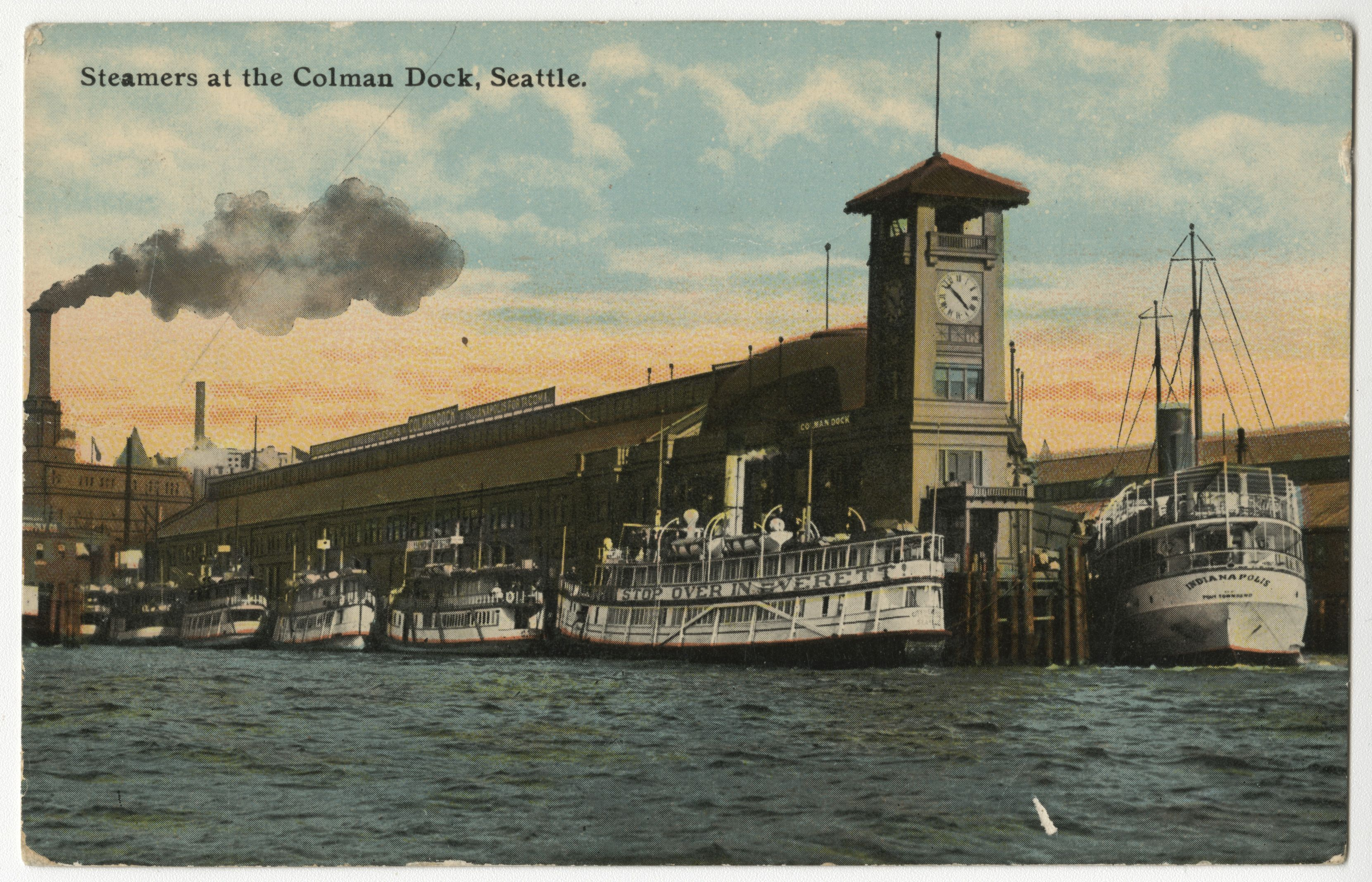
Colman Dock in the early 1910s, surrounded by "Mosquito Fleet" boats.

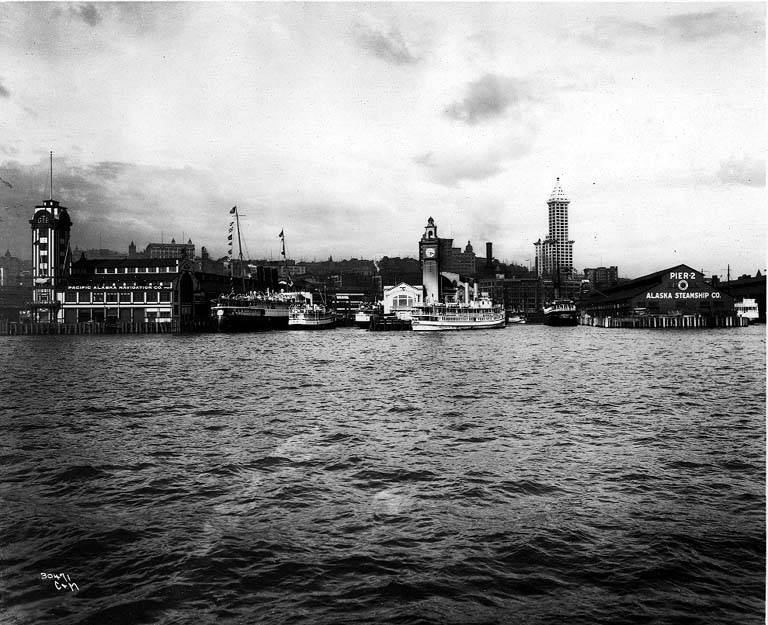
The pre-fire Grand Trunk Pacific dock, Colman Dock, and Alaska Steamship Co. at Pier 2, which later became Pier 51.

Pier 50 and Pier 52 are used as operating ferry terminals for Washington State Ferries and the King County Water Taxi. As of 2008, there is no longer a Pier 51. Pier 50 has two passenger-only water taxis running to Vashon Island and West Seattle, while ferries carrying both vehicles and passengers run from Pier 52 to Bainbridge Island and Bremerton in Kitsap County.

Pier 52 was historically known as Colman Dock. The original Colman Dock was built by Scottish engineer James Colman in 1882. It burned with most of the rest of the city in the Great Seattle Fire of 1889, but was quickly rebuilt. In 1908, Colman extended the dock to a total length of 705 feet (215 m) and added a domed waiting room and a 72-foot (22 m) clocktower. Calamity hit four years later. On the night of April 25, 1912, the steel-hulled ship Alameda accidentally set its engines "full speed ahead" instead of reversing, and slammed into the dock. The dock tower fell into the bay and the sternwheeler Telegraph was sunk. The clock was salvaged, as was the Telegraph, and the dock was reconstructed with a new tower. No one died in the Alameda accident, but a less dramatic accident the following month proved fatal. On May 19, 1912, a gangplank collapsed as passengers were boarding the Black Ball steamer Flyer. At least 60 people fell into the water. One woman and one child died.

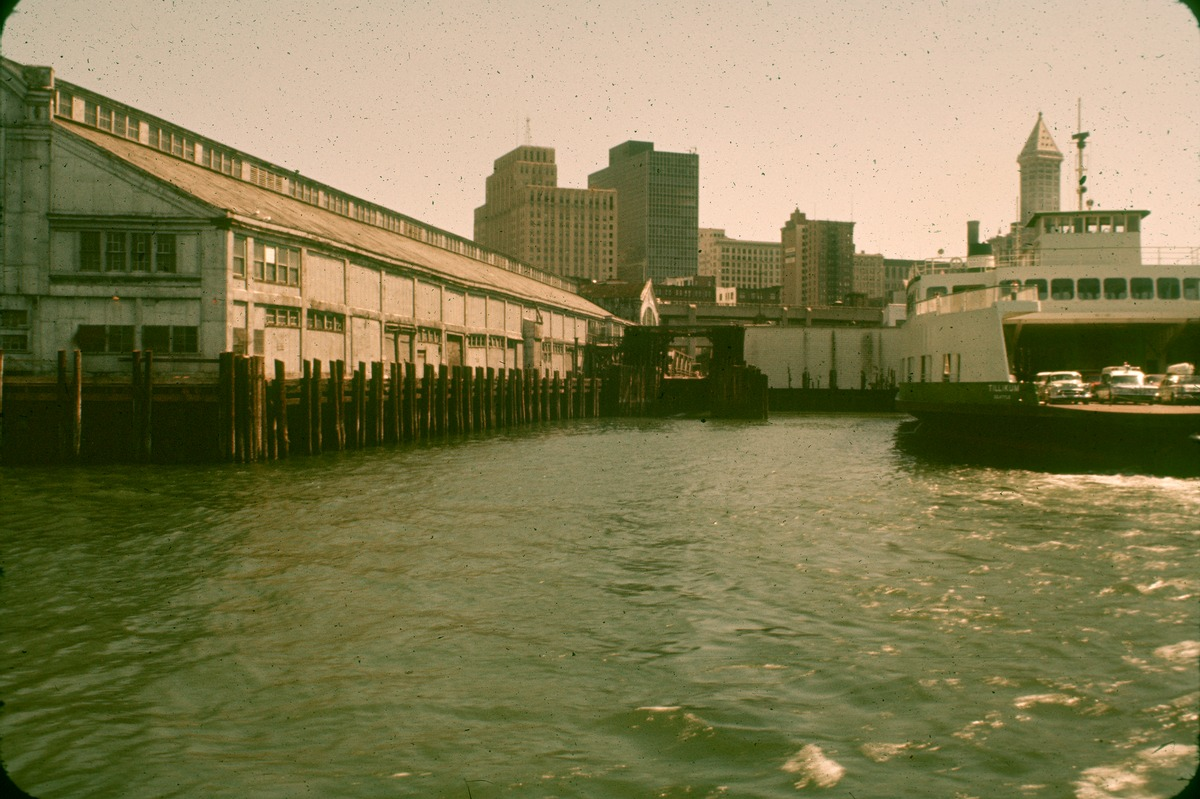
Grand Trunk Pacific Dock (at left) shortly before its 1964 demolition.

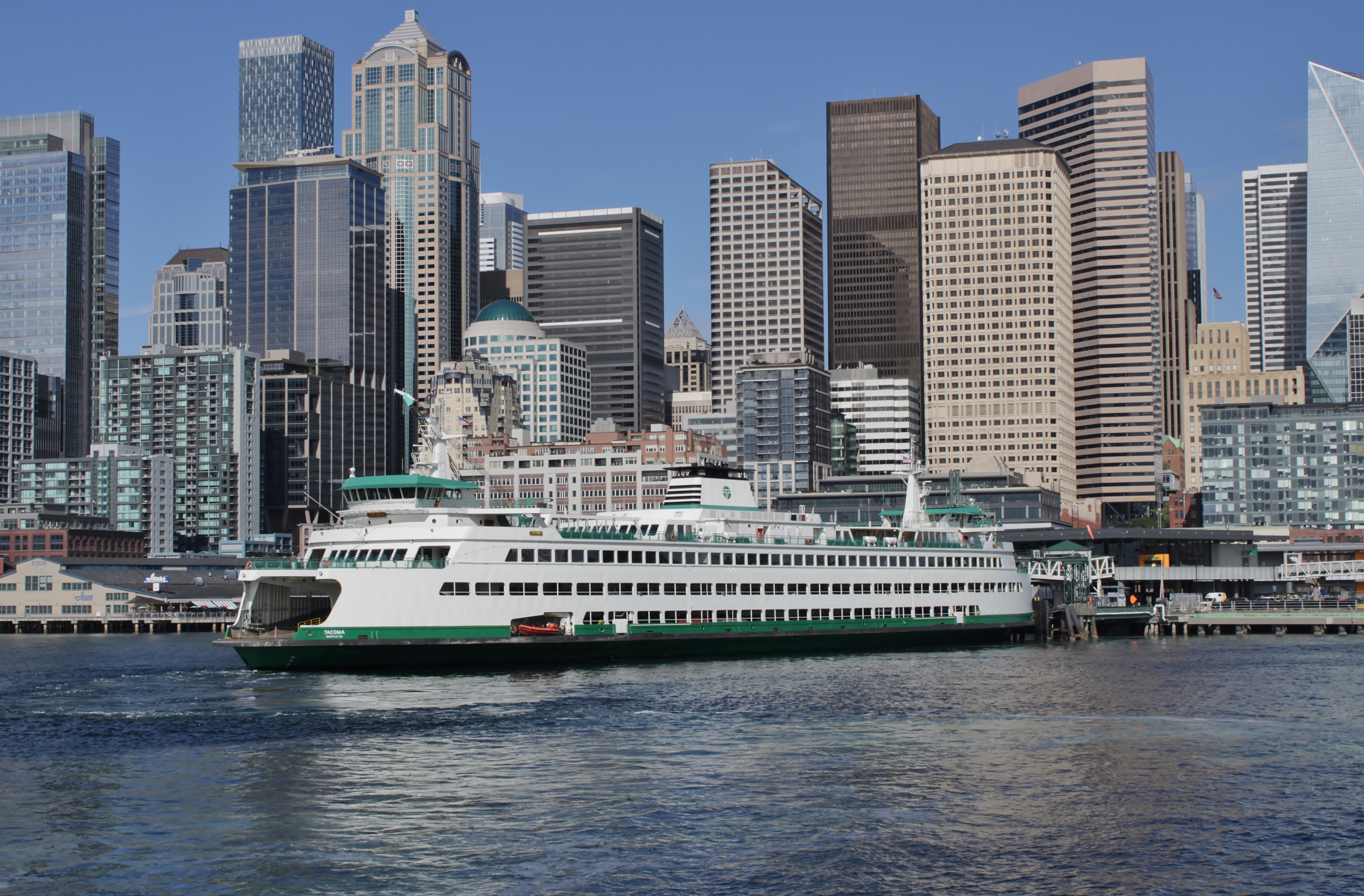
A Washington State Ferry at Washington State Ferry Terminal / Colman Dock (2024).

In 1912, Puget Sound was still served by the "Mosquito Fleet", an assortment of boats plying a variety of routes. The following year, Joshua Green founded the Puget Sound Navigation Company (PSNC or Black Ball Line). Within about a decade, they had consolidated control of regional ferries. In the mid-1930s they modernized Colman Dock, using an Art Deco style that matched their streamlined signature ferry MV Kalakala.

In 1951, Washington State bought out PSNC and took over the ferry system. Work on the present terminal began a decade later; there have been several reconfigurations and modernizations since. The very month that the state ferry terminal opened, it was the subject of another accident. The Kalakala, which had recently been voted Seattle's second biggest attraction after the then-new Space Needle, rammed the terminal February 21, 1966. Though dramatic, the damage proved not to be severe. The ferry needed only minor repairs and was back in service the next day. Repairs to the slip cost $80,000 and took two months to complete.

The clock from the old Colman Dock tower, dunked into the bay in the 1912 Alameda accident and removed in the 1936 renovation, was rediscovered (lying in pieces) in 1976, purchased by the Port of Seattle in 1985, restored, given as a gift to the Washington State Department of Transportation, and reinstalled on the present Colman Dock May 18, 1985.

The Grand Trunk Pacific dock stood just north of Colman Dock at the foot of Marion Street. The original dock was built in 1910 as the largest wooden pier on the West Coast. It was not there for long. On July 30, 1914, it was swept away by an explosion and massive fire. The cause has never been determined. Five people died and 29 more were injured. The flames were hot enough to scorch several parts of Colman Dock, but the fire department managed to contain the fire largely to the one pier. A replacement dock was promptly built, and survived until 1964, when it was replaced by waiting area for automobiles boarding ferries at the new ferry terminal.

=== Fire Station No. 5 ===
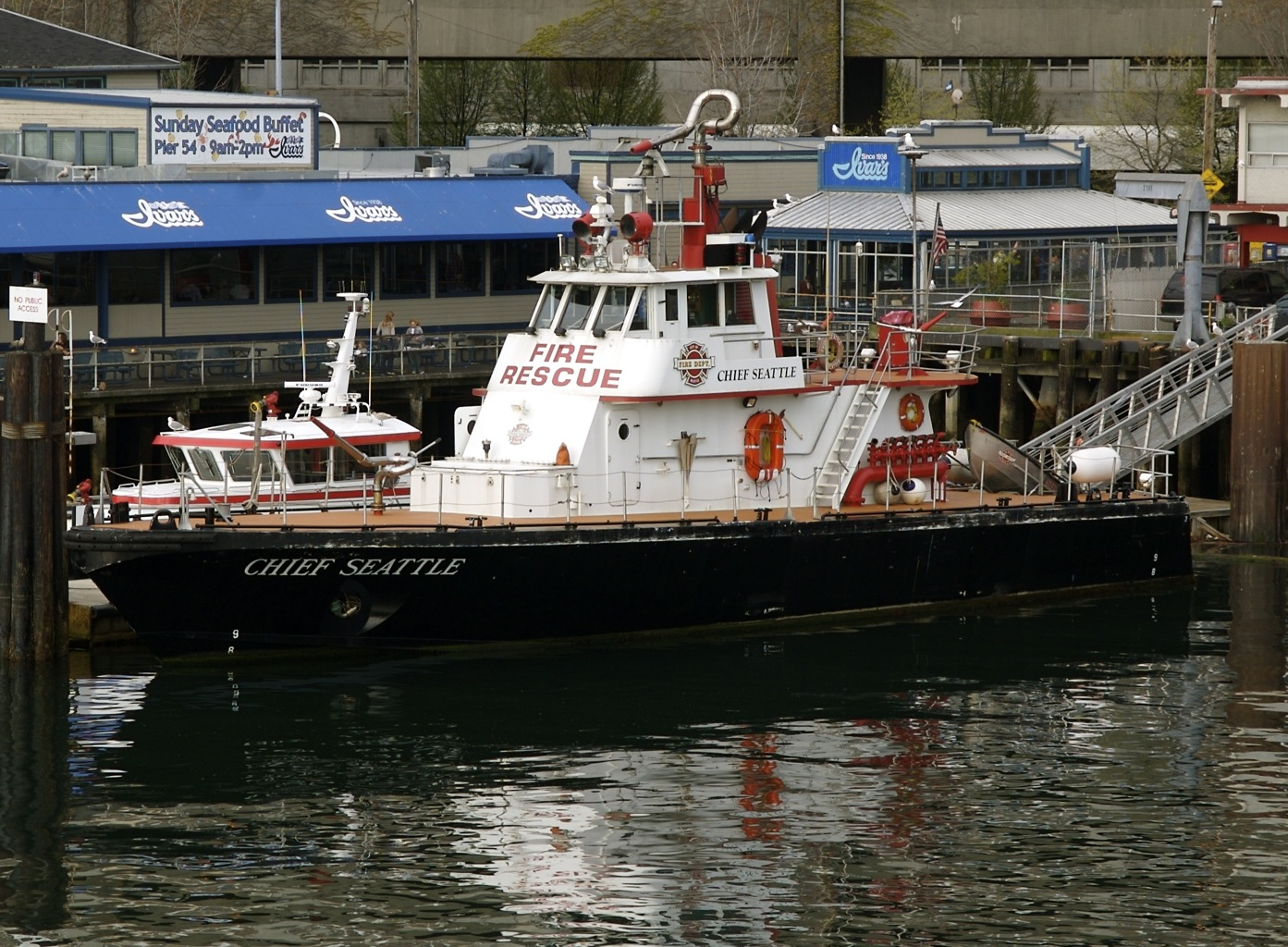
Fireboat Chief Seattle at Pier 53 in 2007.

Pier 53, a very short pier just north of the ferry terminal near the foot of Madison Street, is the site of Seattle Fire Station No. 5, at 925 Alaskan Way. The present 1963 building is the third fire station at this address and the fourth to serve the Central Waterfront. The fire department used to play a particularly critical role on the waterfront: not only were the piers all made of wood; until federal money helped pay for the construction of a seawall in 1934, so was the road along the water (prior to that Railroad Avenue, after that Alaskan Way). The Great Seattle Fire of 1889 had consumed the piers as far north as Union Street along with the rest of the heart of the city.

After the Great Fire, a small one-story wood frame firehouse was erected near the foot of Madison Street, but not quite at the present site. It opened January 3, 1891 with a crew of nine, the new fireboat Snoqualmie and a small hose wagon. In 1902, a larger two-story wood-frame building was constructed on the present site and in 1910, the new fireboat Duwamish replaced the Snoqualmie. The wood-frame building was demolished in 1916 and replaced by an elegant brick building in 1917, incorporating Craftsman and Tudor Revival details. An additional fireboat Alki came into service in 1928.

While the 1917 fire station was recognized as an aesthetically good building, by the early 1960s its supporting pier timbers were becoming unsafe. The building was demolished in early 1961. After extensive work on the pier supports, the new modern building by Durham, Anderson & Freed opened in December 1963.

=== Piers 54–56 ===
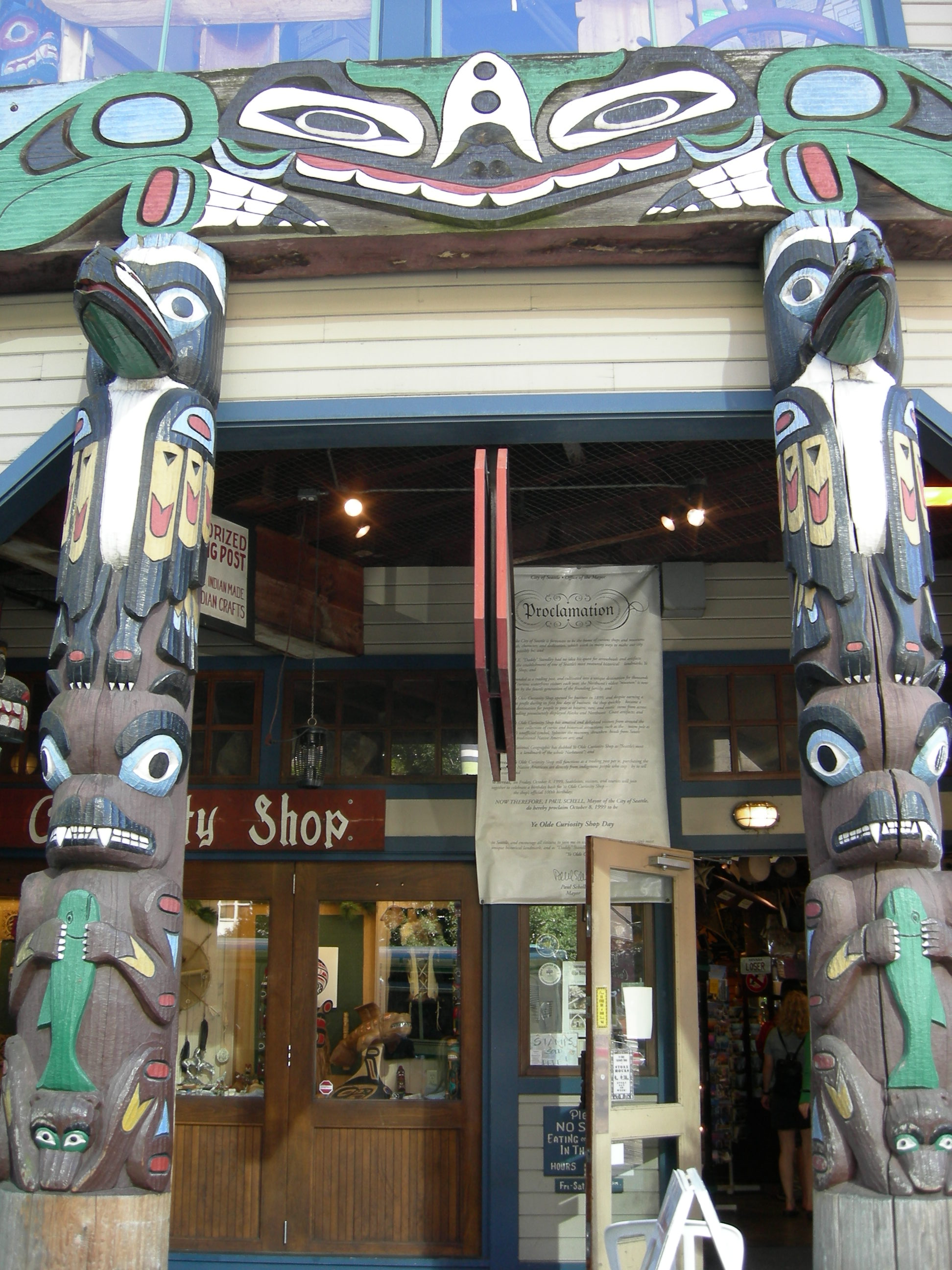
Northwest Native carvings at the entrance to Ye Olde Curiosity Shop on Pier 54 in 2007.

Pier 54 (originally Pier 3) and its shed were constructed in 1900 by the Northern Pacific Railway, the southernmost of their three adjacent piers between Madison and University Streets. The shed's first tenants were Galbraith and Bacon (James Galbraith and Cecil Bacon) who dealt in grain and hay, and also in building materials. In Mosquito Fleet days it became known as the Galbraith Dock, from which the Kitsap County Transportation Company, run by James Galbraith's son Walter Galbraith, competed against the Black Ball Line at the Colman Dock. It was home port for the Kitsap, the Utopia, the Reliance and the Hyak. From 1929 to the mid-1930s it was general headquarters for Gorst Air Transport, who operated a seaplane service from there, using Keystone-Loening planes. They also operated out of Bremerton across the Sound. Through this period, the Northern Pacific still owned the pier, but by 1944 the Washington Fish and Oyster Company (now Ocean Beauty Seafoods) had purchased the pier and was its main tenant. Engineering firm Reese and Callender Associates helped them reinforce the pier and to adapt it to its new use.

By 1938, the Kitsap Transportation Company was out of business. That year, Ivar Haglund rented the northeast corner of the pier shed for a one-room aquarium, which included a small fish and chips stand. The aquarium closed around 1945, at which time the restaurant moved to the southeastern corner and was redesigned in Streamline Moderne style. Ivar's Acres of Clams, named after an old folk song, became the flagship of the Ivar's chain of seafood restaurants. In 1966, Haglund purchased the pier, and Washington Fish and Oyster Company became his tenant. The restaurant was repeatedly redesigned and expanded over the years, achieving more or less its present configuration before Haglund's death in 1985.

Since 1988, Pier 54 has been home not only to Ivar's Acres of Clams, but also to the current incarnation of Ye Olde Curiosity Shop, which has occupied a succession of venues on the Central Waterfront since its founding in 1899. Besides the usual run of tourist souvenirs, it sells a variety of Northwest Native art; the store prides itself on dealing directly with the artists. They also carry Russian lacquer boxes, matreshka dolls and porcelain figurines, copper and wooden postcards, music boxes, and a variety of other unusual items. None of these are nearly as unusual as the store's "museum" curiosities, which are not for sale: "Sylvester" the mummy, fetal Conjoined twins calves, a collection of shrunken human heads, a woven cedar bark hat worn by Chief Seattle, whale and walrus oosiks, and a number of items that appeared in Ripley's Believe It Or Not.

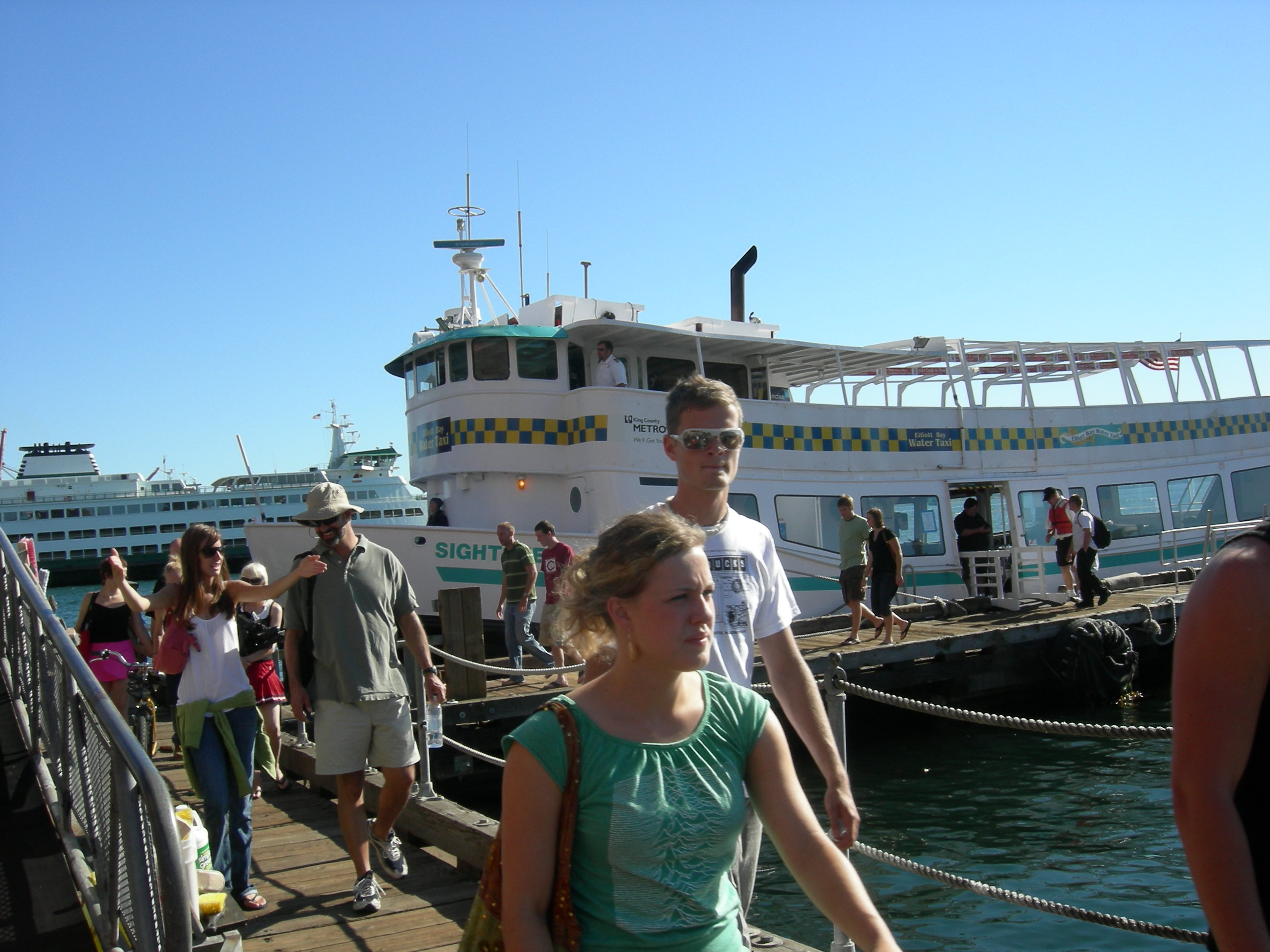
Elliott Bay Water Taxi at Pier 55 in 2007.

Pier 55, at the foot of Spring Street, was originally named Pier 4. The first Pier 4, built in 1900, collapsed in September 1901, causing the loss of at least 1700 tons of freight. No one was killed in the accident, and the following year the Northern Pacific Railroad completed a new Pier 4, this time with better bracing, which survives today as the renamed Pier 55. Its first tenant, the Arlington Dock Company, was a shipping agent for passenger steamships to several West Coast cities and to Alaska, Asia and Europe. The pier was used for passenger service until around World War I. The Fisheries Supply Company became the principal tenant from at least 1938 to the 1980s. In 1945, the pier was remodeled. Structural improvements were made at that time by Melvin O. Sylliaasen and in the 1960s by the engineering firm Harvey Dodd and Associates. Further improvements were made in the late 1990s, along with some alterations to the exterior of the pier shed.

The north side of Pier 55 was formerly the downtown terminus of the Elliott Bay Water Taxi (now the King County Water Taxi) to West Seattle before the dock was moved to Pier 50. Between Piers 55 and 56, and utilizing parts of both piers as of 2008, Argosy Cruises moor the tour boats Royal Argosy, Spirit of Seattle, Lady Mary, Goodtime II, and Sightseer. From 2009 to 2021, one of its routes included the boat to Tillicum Village on Blake Island.

Pier 56 (originally Pier 5), the third of the Northern Pacific Railroad wharves, was constructed in 1900. President Theodore Roosevelt landed there on the steamer Spokane on May 23, 1903. With the adjacent Pier 4/55, it was one of the two Arlington Docks, but is better known as the base of operations for Frank Waterhouse and Company, a steamship line that rose to prominence during the Klondike Gold Rush. They provided transportation to the Yukon and Alaska, including the Bering Sea, and transported American soldiers to Manila in the Philippines during the Spanish–American War of 1898–1899. Eventually, they serviced Hawaii, the Mediterranean and Russia, but went bankrupt in 1920.

After the Waterhouse company, the pier housed a succession of firms: the Hayden Dock Company, Shepard Line Intercoastal Service, and the Northland Transportation Company, as well as the Arlington Dock Company. During the 1962 Century 21 Exposition, the World's Fair at what afterwards became Seattle Center, the pier added curio shops, restaurants, fish houses, etc., and ceased to be a transportation hub. Trident Imports, opened on the pier around that time, had a decades-long run of importing everything from rattan furniture from Southeast Asia to chocolate from Belgium. Ted Griffin's Seattle Marine Aquarium was located at the west end of the pier. Its star attraction, Namu the killer whale, died in 1966. The architecture, landscape and urban design firm Mithun completed a renovation of the pier in 2000 and is now housed in the second floor of the pier shed.

=== Piers 57–63 ===
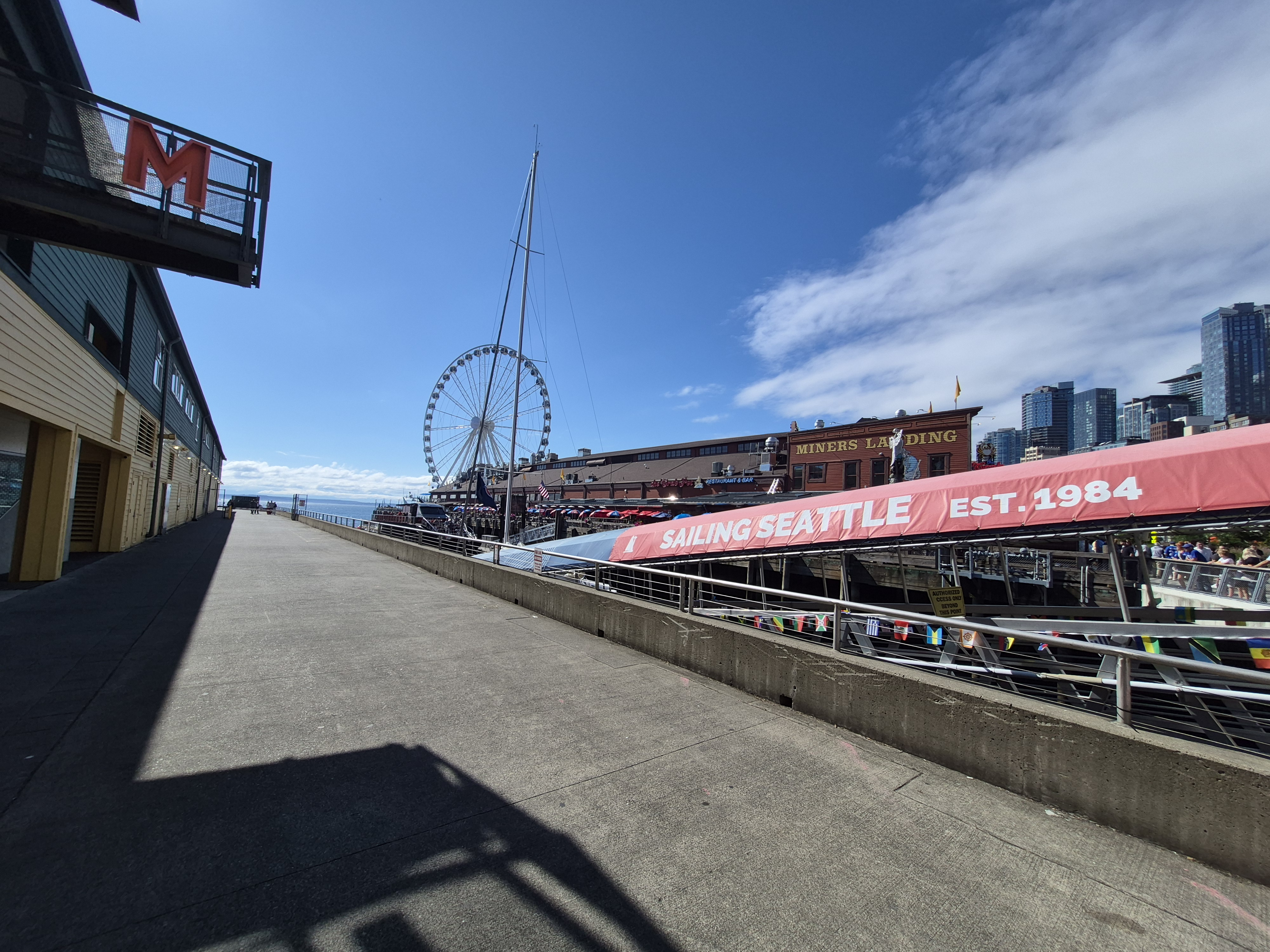
The view of Pier 57 from Seattle's Pier 56 in summer 2026.

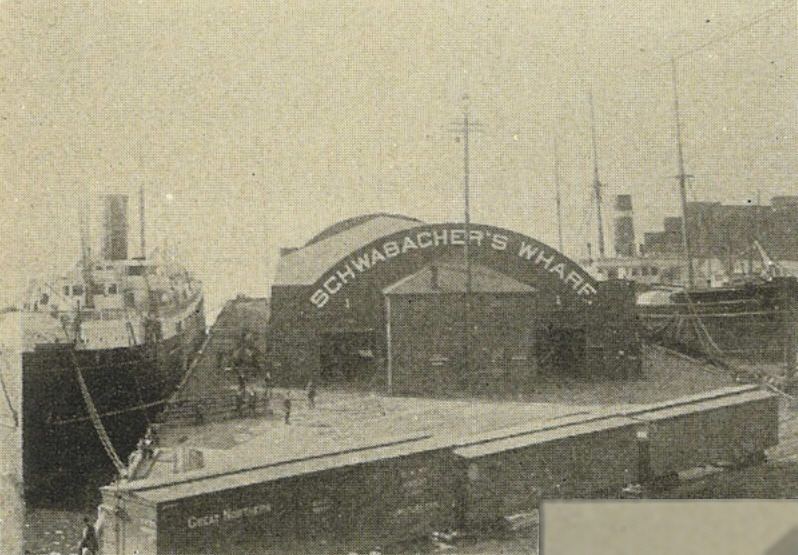
Schwabacher Wharf (now Pier 58) in 1900.

The city purchased Pier 57 in 1971 and Piers 58 to 61 in 1978, after cargo shipping at the piers was relocated years earlier to the container port to the south. In 1989, the city traded Pier 57 for Piers 62 and 63.

Pier 57 (originally Pier 6) near the foot of University Street was built in 1902 by the Miller and Geske Construction Company and repeatedly modified over the course of the next decade. It was originally built for the John B. Agen Company. In 1909, the pier passed into the hands of the Chicago, Milwaukee & St. Paul Railroad, the last of four transcontinental railroads to reach Seattle. The Chicago, Milwaukee & St. Paul was commonly known as the "Milwaukee Road", so the pier became known as the "Milwaukee Pier". It soon became the terminal for the McCormick Steamship Line, the Munson McCormick Line and Osaka Shosen Kaisha, and by the mid-1930s was also known as the "McCormick Terminal". In the 1950s at least part of the pier was used for fish processing. By the 1960s, the Port of Seattle owned the pier, and had cut holes in the deck for recreational fishing, but the pilings were deteriorating and the pier was settling unevenly. In 1971, the City purchased the pier from the Port and renovated it over the next three years. The renovated pier, now known as the "Bay Pavilion", has restaurants, shops, an amusement arcade, and an early 20th-century carousel. In June 2012 a 175-foot Ferris wheel, the Seattle Great Wheel, opened. The wheel has 42 climate-controlled gondolas, each holding up to six passengers. Pier 57 is now privately owned after the city traded it for Piers 62 and 63.

Pier 58 (originally Pier 7) was constructed during the same period as the renovation of Pier 57, Waterfront Park, designed by the Bumgardner Partnership and consultants, was constructed on the site of the Schwabacher Wharf demolished in the 1950s. The Schwabacher Wharf had been just far enough north to survive the Great Seattle Fire in 1889. In the 1890s, it was the site of two prominent events in the city's history. The freighter Miike Maru opened Seattle's Japan trade by docking there August 31, 1896. Less than a year later, July 17, 1897, the steamship Portland arrived from Alaska bearing a "ton of gold", from the Klondike, Yukon. The ensuing Yukon Gold Rush formed strong bonds between Seattle and Alaska, and brought enormous wealth to Seattle as the "Gateway to Alaska".

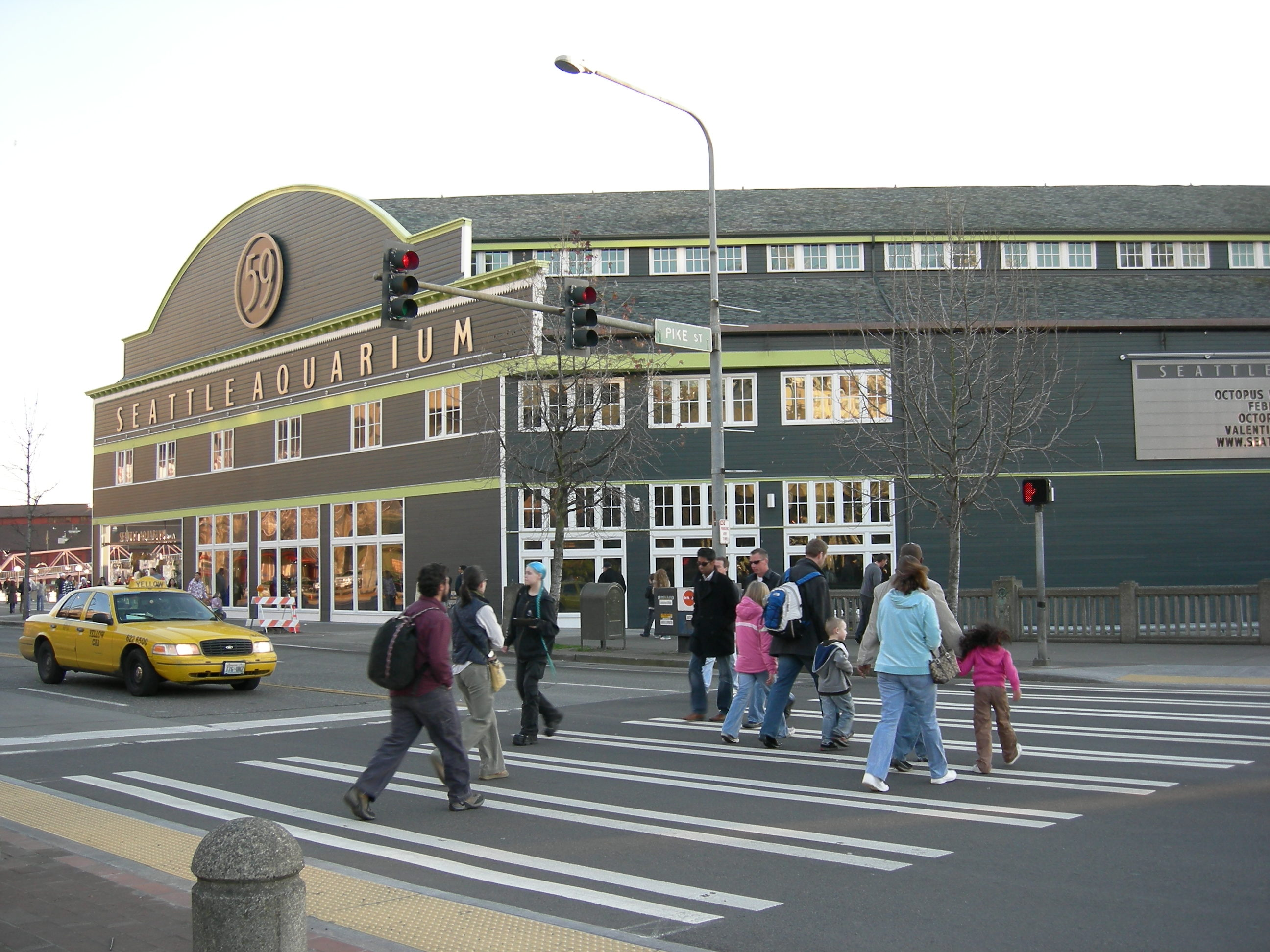
The Seattle Aquarium at Pier 59 in 2008.

Pier 59 is the site of the main building of the Seattle Aquarium, built on a pier shed first constructed in 1905. In 1896 fish and grain dealers Ainsworth and Dunn (see below) built a pier at the location of today's designated city landmark Pier 59, originally Pier 8, also known as the Pike Street Pier. The pier had to be reconfigured because the 1897 Thomson/Cotterill plan dictated that all piers run parallel to one another. Ainsworth and Dunn left this pier around the time the present shed was constructed; subsequent tenants were grain dealer Willis Robinson and the Northwestern Steamship Company. By 1912, the pier was owned and largely occupied by steamship agent Dodwell Dock and Warehouse Company, owned by Dodwell & Co. (Hong Kong). It became known as the Dodwell Dock. That name fell out of usage when the pier was sold in 1916 to the Pacific Net and Twine Company, later merged into Pacific Marine Supply Company. In the 1950s through early 60s, Pier 59 was the home of Puget Sound Tug & Barge. Crowley moved the operations to the Duwamish Waterway in the 1960s. The two "stubby" piers known as the Fish and Salt Docks (later Piers 60 and 61) were purchased by the Port of Seattle in the mid-1940s, and were removed in 1975 to make room for the Seattle Aquarium. Prior to acquisition by the Port, they had housed the Whiz Fish Company and the Palace Fish Company.

Pier 62 (built in 1901) and Pier 63 (built in 1905) have long since lost their sheds, which were similar to the one on Pier 59. Pier 62 was originally numbered Pier 9, known as the Gaffney Dock, after its absentee owner Mary Gaffney. Pier 63 (originally Pier 10) was known by 1908 as the Holden Dock, but was more commonly known as the Virginia Dock or Virginia Street Dock from its location. It was designed by architect Max Umbrecht and one of its main tenants in the 1910s was Northwest Fisheries, who canned and distributed Alaskan red salmon. An overpass connected the dock to a warehouse on the other side of Railroad Avenue. For many years after the city acquired these two piers in 1989 (in a trade with a private company for Pier 57), they were the venue for the Summer Nights at the Pier concert series, but the "aged and deteriorating" piers can no longer handle the weight of a stage and a crowd. In 2006, the city began plans to replace these piers. In 2017, work began to remove the pier's wooden supports replacing them with 175 steel legs. In addition, a floating dock was added alongside the pier.

=== Bell Street Pier, Edgewater hotel, and Port headquarters ===
Pier 66 is the official designation for the Port of Seattle's Bell Street Pier and Bell Harbor complex, which replaced historic Piers 64, 65, and 66 in the mid-1990s. Facilities at the Bell Street facility include a marina, a cruise ship terminal, a conference center, the Odyssey Maritime Discovery Center, restaurants, and marine services. A pedestrian elevator and overpass at Bell Street connects it to the upland World Trade Center (another Port of Seattle property), as well as to a parking lot and to Belltown in general. The area once was a shantytown. Cleared around 1903 in conjunction with the regrading of Denny Hill, it became home to the Pacific Coast Company's Orient Dock, which ran parallel to the shoreline rather than at the usual northeast–southwest angle. The southern portion of that dock was sometimes referred to as Pier D. By the 1920s, the Orient Dock was replaced by two "finger piers" running at the usual angles. These Lenora Street Piers (Piers 64 and 65) were used by the "Princess Ships" of the Canadian Pacific Railway and the Leslie Salt Co. The Port of Seattle's original Bell Street Pier, the previous Pier 66, was built here in 1914 on dirt from the Denny Regrade. Despite the Thomson/Cotterill plan, the Orient Dock and both the old and new Bell Street Pier were built parallel to the shore. There was a bridge on the site of the present-day pedestrian overpass.

Pier 67, renamed from Galbraith-Bacon Pier, Wall Street Pier, or Vine Street Pier in World War II, is the site of The Edgewater hotel (originally and briefly the Camelot, and for many years the Edgewater Inn). The hotel has hosted numerous celebrities over the years, most famously the Beatles who came to Seattle in 1964 during the height of Beatlemania. Pier 68 (the Booth Fisheries Pier) was demolished at the time the hotel was built on the newly reconstructed Pier 67.

Pier 69, north of Pier 67 and roughly between Vine and Clay Streets, is the site of the Port of Seattle headquarters and the Seattle terminus of the Clipper Navigation, a foot passenger (walk-on only) ferry with regular service to the Inner Harbour in Victoria, British Columbia and seasonal service to Friday Harbor, Washington. Although very heavily remodeled, the pier traces its history in part to Pier 13, built by the Roslyn Coal and Coke Company (1900), which also had a warehouse across Alaskan Way in the early 20th century. The warehouse was torn down to build the American Can Company building (headquarters of Zulily since 2013), which had an overpass to the pier in the 1930s.

=== Pier 70 ===
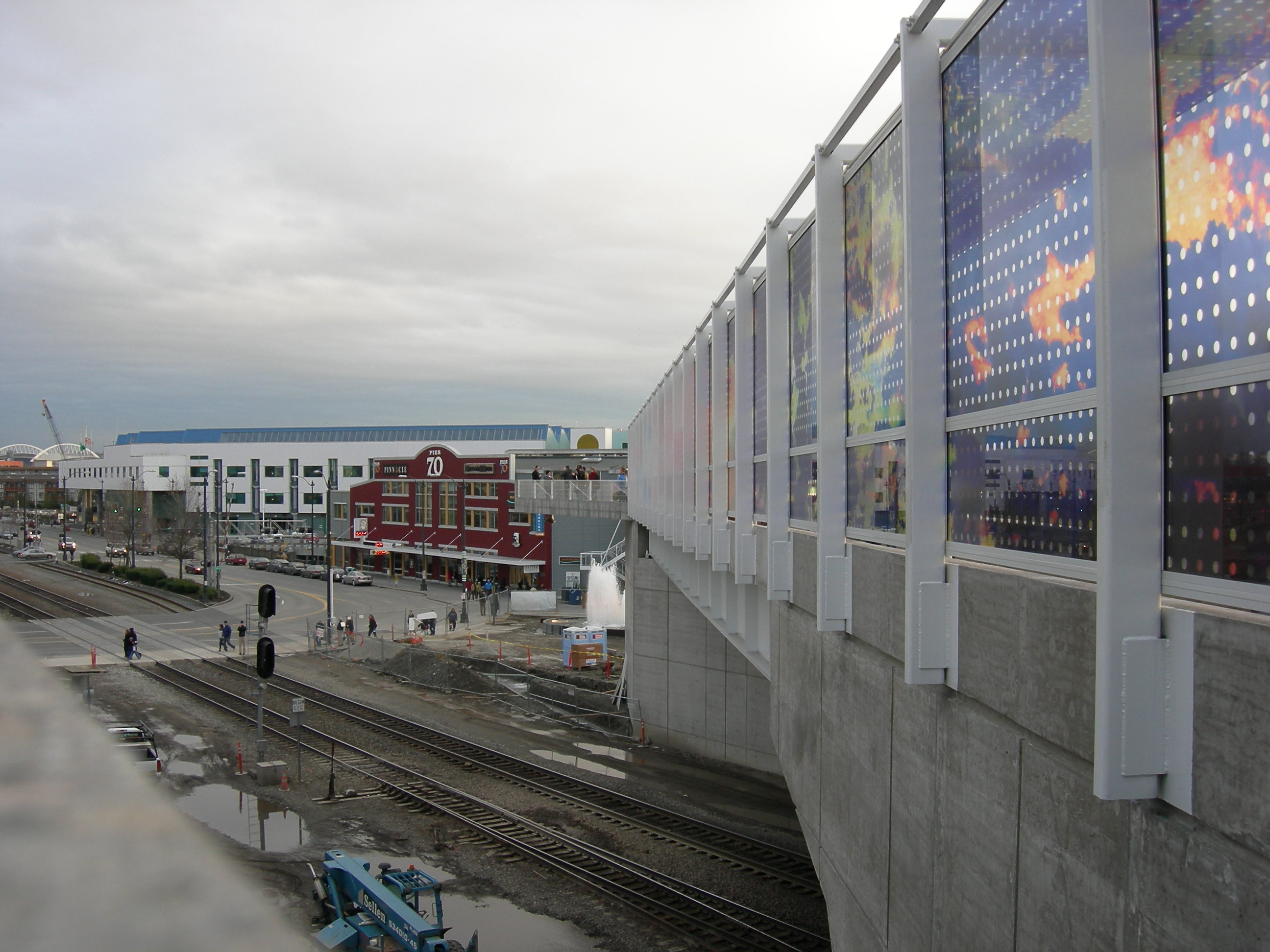
Looking from Olympic Sculpture Park toward the northern end of the Central Waterfront. A small portion of the Bell Harbor complex can be seen at left, then the Port headquarters, Pier 70, and a footbridge in the sculpture park incorporating Teresita Fernandez's piece Seattle Cloud Cover. At slightly lower left, Broad Street crosses the BNSF tracks and curves into Alaskan Way.

Pier 70, at the foot of Clay and Broad Streets, now marks the northern end of the Central Waterfront. Beyond that are the Olympic Sculpture Park and Myrtle Edwards Park. Although the pier shed retains its historic shape, it was remodeled after a fire in 1915, remodeled again in the 1970s, and so heavily altered in the late 1990s—reclad with metal siding, all windows and doors modernized and many reconfigured—that (unlike the old Northern Pacific piers) it retains only traces of its historic character.

The pier was built as Pier 14 by Ainsworth and Dunn and completed in 1902 along with a warehouse across Railroad Avenue (today's Alaskan Way) that later, from 1970 until 2016, housed the Old Spaghetti Factory. Ainsworth and Dunn's Seattle Fish Company dated from 1889 and occupied a succession of Central Waterfront locations. Beginning with a retail operation on higher ground at Second Avenue and Pike Street, they established themselves on the waterfront at the foot of Seneca Street by 1893, expanded their business to include grain and feed, and built Pier 8 / Pier 59 (though not its current pier shed) in 1896. By that time they had canning operations in Seattle and at Blaine, Washington. Eventually they moved their entire operation to Blaine, but they owned of Pier 14 until at least 1920, taking on a succession of tenants. In 1905, the main tenant was the Puget Sound Wharf and Warehouse Company, in 1912, the American and Hawaiian Steamship Company and in 1920, the Dodwell Dock and Warehouse Company, operating it as a terminal for the Northland Steamship Company and the Blue Funnel Line. The Washington State Liquor Control Board used the pier as a warehouse during World War II, after which The Coast Guard used the pier as its Seattle base from 1946 to 1955, and visiting naval vessels moored on its north side.

Like the piers to it south, its historic uses were superseded by containerization, and it was remodeled to house shops and restaurants. Triad Development bought the pier in 1995, and in the late 1990s it was remodeled as a headquarters for Go2Net, which was merged into InfoSpace, and fared poorly in the 2000–2001 crash that followed the dot-com bubble. Immediately before that remodel, in 1998 The Real World: Seattle was filmed there. Because the Central Waterfront piers are not zoned residential, the building was officially a 24-hour-a-day film set for the shoot.

=== Across Alaskan Way ===
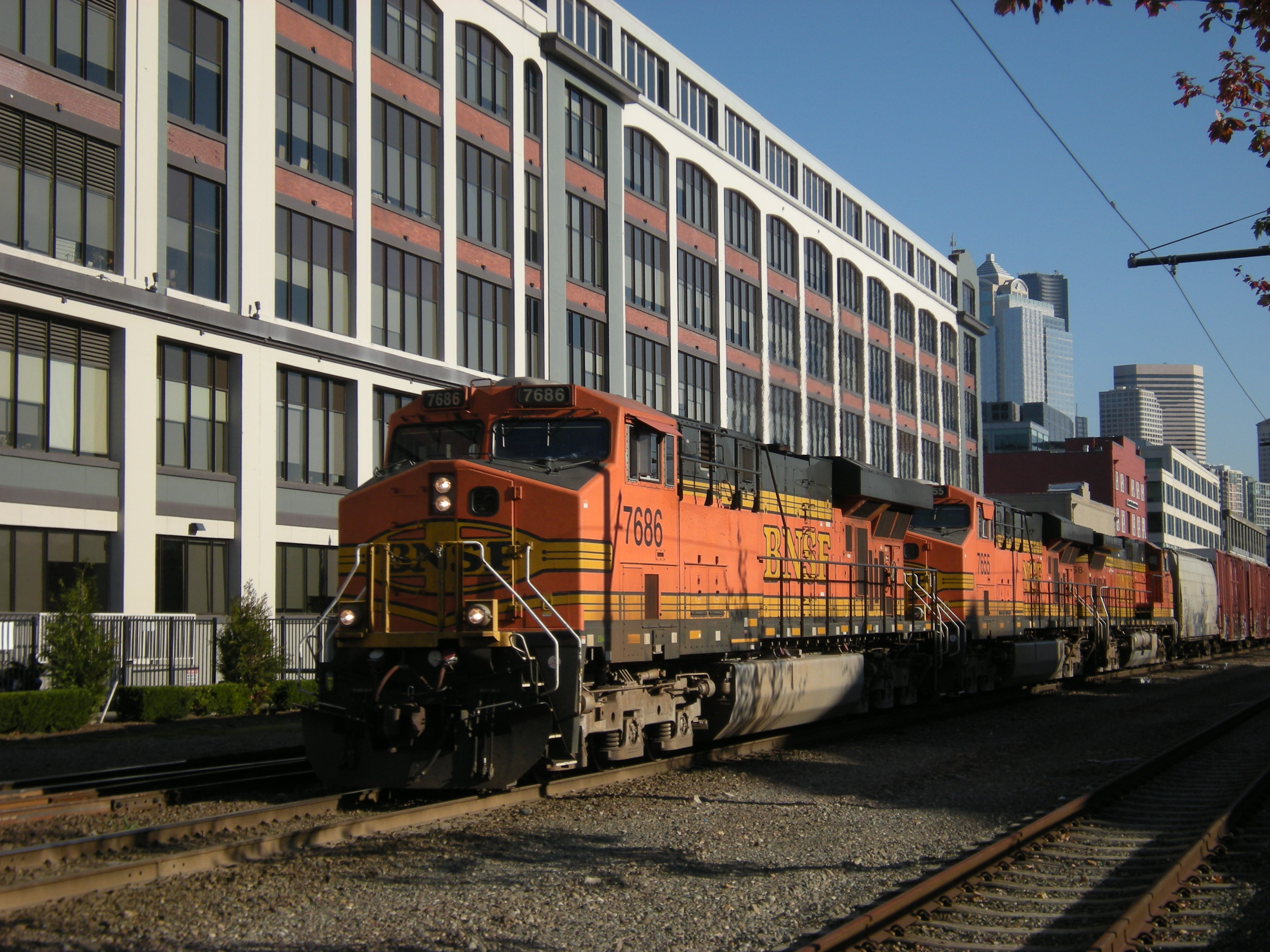
A BNSF freight train passing by the former American Can Company building.

Several buildings on the inland side of Alaskan Way have strong maritime associations. For example, as mentioned above, the building that once housed the Old Spaghetti Factory was built in conjunction with Pier 14, now Pier 70. Southeast from there, across Clay Street, the 2601 Elliott building that was once the headquarters of Zulily as well as part of the Art Institute of Seattle began life in 1916 as the American Can Company, and in the 1930s was connected to Pier 69 by a skybridge. Continuing south across Vine Street is the former Booth Fisheries Building. Even farther inland, across Elliott Way from the Booth Fisheries Building, three former cannery worker cottages survive.

Another example is the Agen Warehouse, also known as Olympic Cold Storage Warehouse, at the corner of Western Avenue and Seneca Street near the downtown piers. Designed by architect John Graham and built in 1910, it is listed on the National Register of Historic Places. It originally housed John Agen's Alaska Butter and Cream Company, which moved from Pier 6 (now Pier 57). Immediately north of that is another Graham building, built in 1918 as a warehouse for the Pacific Net and Twine Company. That company merged with the Marine Supply Company to form the Pacific Marine Supply Company, which continued to use the warehouse in conjunction with its operations on the old Pier 1 at the foot of Yesler Way. More recently, the building has been associated with genetic engineering company Immunex.

== History ==
=== Early native villages ===
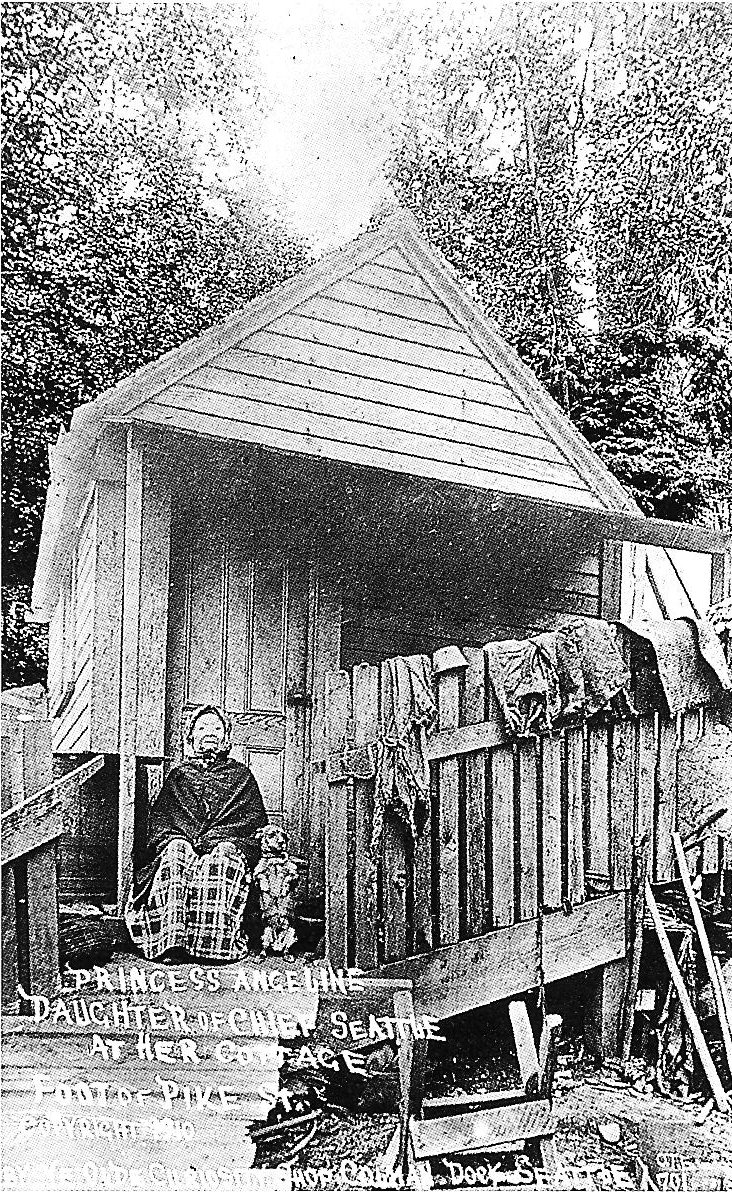
A postcard dating from less than 15 years after Princess Angeline's death shows her beach shack near Pike Street.

The history of human activity on what is now Seattle's Central Waterfront predates the settlement that became the city of Seattle. The Duwamish had a winter village of approximately 8 longhouses roughly at the intersection of First Avenue South and Yesler Way. With about 200 people, it was one of the most sizable villages along Elliott Bay. Its name, dᶻidᶻəlal̕ič ("little crossing-over place") is still used by the Duwamish today.

Farther north, at the foot of Bell Street, was a ravine with another Duwamish encampment, babaqʷəb ("little prairies"). It may have constituted a route to the prairie that extended between Queen Anne Hill and the former Denny Hill, including the site of the present Seattle Center. Two longhouses took advantage of a spring. By around the 1860s, the longhouses were gone, but modest beach structures remained.

There were also burial grounds roughly at the foot of Seneca Street. There appears to have been a smaller later burial ground just north of babaqʷəb, possibly dating from when the larger settlement at dᶻidᶻəlal̕ič had been pre-empted by settlers.

Chief Seattle's daughter Princess Angeline continued to live on the central waterfront until the end of her life (she died in 1896). It is not known exactly where her beach shack stood, but photos indicate that it was somewhere just north of the present-day Pike Street Hill Climb. Also into the 1890s, the Duwamish camped on Ballast Island at the foot of Washington Street in the present-day Pioneer Square neighborhood. The mound had been created from ballast and other material dumped by ships. In the late 1890s, Ballast Island was planked over as part a continuation of Railroad Avenue south of Yesler Way. Later, it was dredged and became part of the harbor.

=== 19th-century development ===
Henry Yesler established his steam-powered sawmill at the foot of Mill Road (now Yesler Way) in October 1852. That mill and its wharf were, for several decades, the most important structures on the waterfront. The wharf became a transportation hub.

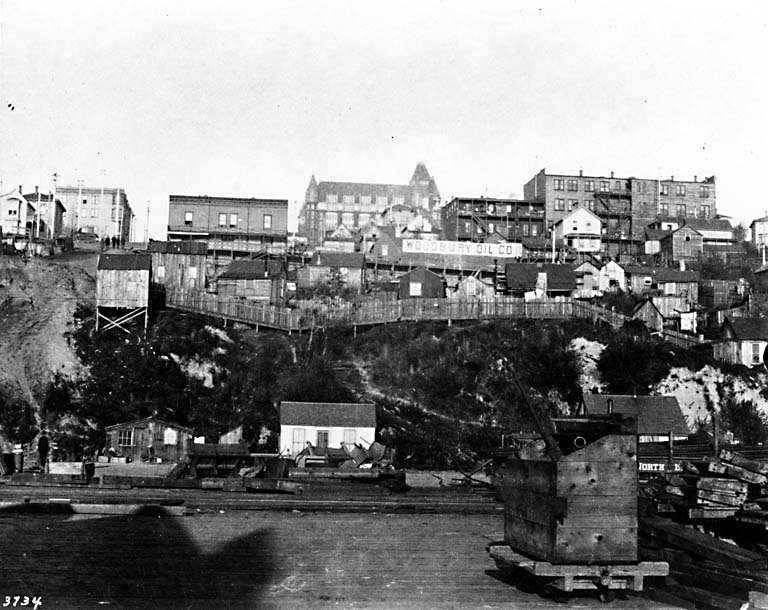
Looking east from the waterfront between Stewart and Virginia Streets from somewhere near Railroad Avenue, the present-day Alaskan Way. The dirt track rising at left is part of Stewart Street. The first Washington Hotel (1891–1906, center, background) sits atop the small, steep Denny Hill, regraded in 1906–1907. This would be at most two blocks north of Princess Angeline's shack, and perhaps a decade later than the photo of her reproduced above.

The Seattle, Lake Shore and Eastern Railway (SLS&ER) was the first to run a rail line along the water, in 1887, with a depot near the foot of Columbia Street on Western Avenue. The SLS&ER was eventually purchased by the Northern Pacific Railway. James J. Hill's Great Northern Railway eventually laid track even farther to the water side. Railroad Avenue, the route of both railways, was 120 feet (37 m) wide and built mainly on pilings over tideflats. The rail lines came from the south and, until 1893, went no farther north than Smith Cove, a short distance north of the Central Waterfront.

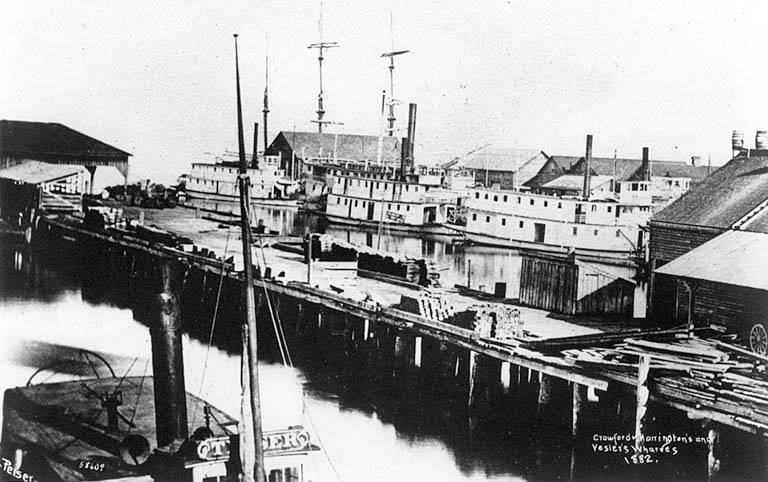
Yesler, Crawford and other wharves in 1882.

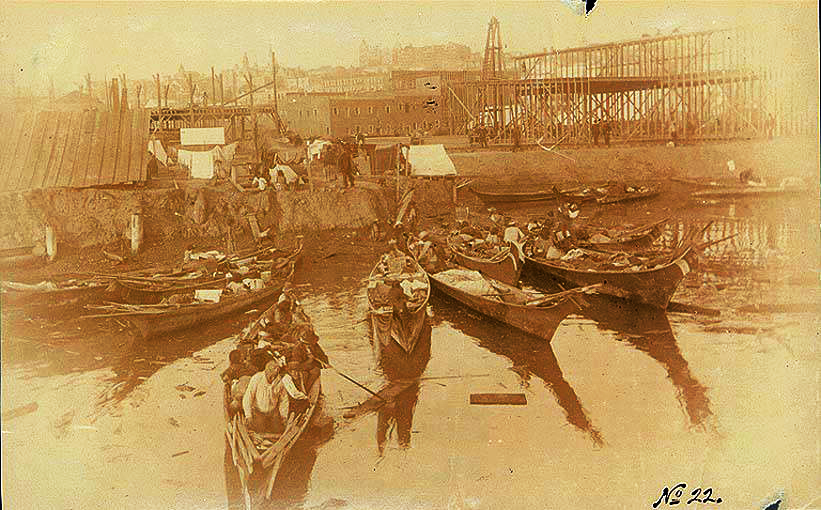
Native American dugout canoes at the foot of S. Washington Street in the early 1890s.

The Great Seattle Fire (June 6, 1889) obliterated Yesler's Wharf and all other waterfront structures south of Union Street. The one major wharf remaining after the fire was the Schwabacher Dock (also known as Schwabacher Wharf or Schwabacher's Wharf), just north of the "burnt district". Within four years after the fire, there was enormous redevelopment west of Front Street (now First Avenue), with an 1893 Sanborn insurance map showing West Street, now Western Avenue, running the entire length of the present Central Waterfront (and then some, continuing northwest into what is now Myrtle Edwards Park), and Water Street (now Elliott Avenue) running more or less along what was then the shore from Bell Street to Broad Street; filling has subsequently moved that shore west. There were numerous docks, mostly perpendicular to the shore. The Sanborn map indicates the nature of the businesses along the waterfront, and suggests that fishing had not yet become an important industry at this time. More typical waterfront uses were warehouses for grain and feed. Just inland from the water were many hotels, ranging from workingmen's hotels to a "Grand Hotel" on Front Street between Madison and Marion Streets.

Prior to Washington statehood in 1889, the question of title to the tidelands was entirely unclear. Yesler and others had built onto the tidelands regardless of this legal limbo. The number of these "tideland jumpers" increased up as statehood approached. Officially, the federal government held the tidelands in trust for the future state, and all such activities—which included the construction of railways—were technically illegal. The new state constitution fashioned a compromise measure: the state generally affirmed its own ownership of tidelands, but provided for case-by-case exceptions to be adjudicated by the courts. In many cases, adjudication had to be made between upland owners and those who had built on pilings on the tidelands. Constitutional provisions were also made for state-owned harbors with zones along the shore reserved for "landings, wharves and streets and other conveniences of navigation and commerce." All this was later modified to allow towns and municipalities to gain more control of their own shorelines, setting the stage for coherent plans for development and reclamation.

The arrangement of the "finger" piers on the Central Waterfront, each more or less a parallelogram, dates from an 1897 plan. Their uniform northeast–southwest direction was prescribed by city engineer Reginald H. Thomson and his assistant George F. Cotterill. Most earlier piers, none of which survive, formed a perfect right angle to the shore; the present piers do not. Thomson and Cotterill's arrangement spared freight trains from needing to make a sharp right angle and prevented piers from potentially running into one another where the shoreline curved.

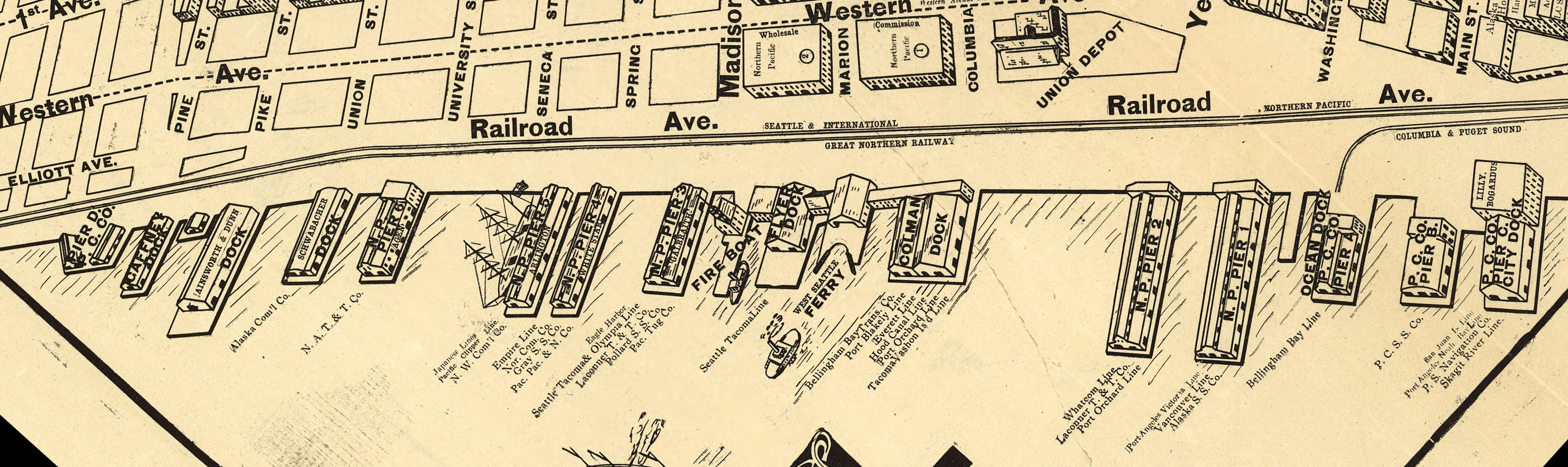
Seattle Central Waterfront, 1903, including annotations of which lines used which piers.

=== Heyday, stagnation, and revival ===
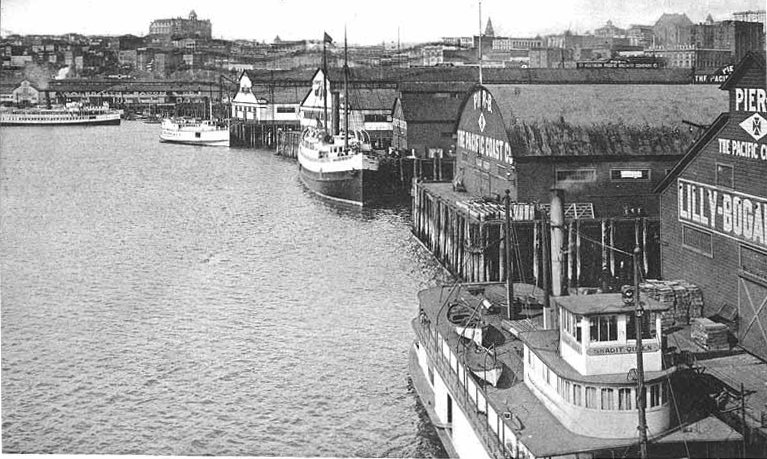
Looking northwest on the waterfront in 1907.

Throughout the first half of the 20th century, Seattle's Central waterfront was the bustling center of one of North America's major ports. The needs of the waterfront created a district of light industrial uses and workingmen's hotels. The waterfront was a focus of the conflicting agendas of big business, radical labor unionists such as the Industrial Workers of the World (IWW), Populists, and middle-class Progressive reformers such as the Municipal Ownership League led by George Cotterill. The Progressives achieved one of their most cherished goals when the Port of Seattle, the first municipal corporation in the United States, was established in 1911, with elected port commissioners. Despite that victory, for the next several decades and even, to a lesser extent, today, much of the Central Waterfront remained in private hands.

The Port Commission nonetheless had an enormous impact shortly after its inception. Their original Bell Street Pier (1914; see below) established a significant presence on the waterfront. However, as Seattle became a particularly successful port during World War I, the Port Commission became increasingly the captive of business interests. Seattle prospered as a port in the 1920s, especially through increased trade with Japan, importing such goods as soybean oil and raw silk. The soybean oil had an important local industrial use: in 1923, I. F. Laucks invented his waterproof "Lauxein" glue. Made from soybeans, it was used heavily by the region's plywood industry.

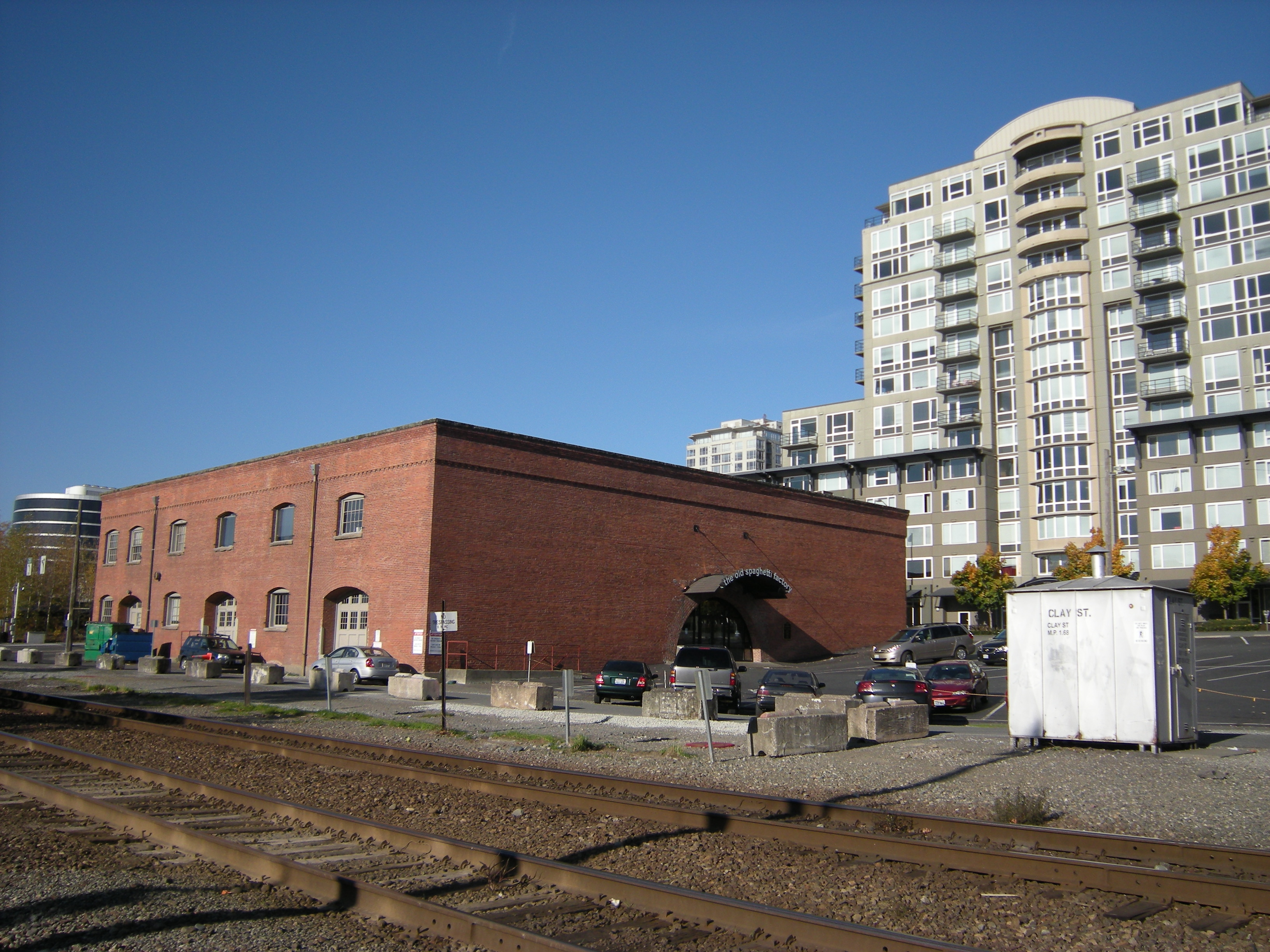
The Ainsworth & Dunn Warehouse between Broad and Clay Streets. Constructed in 1902 but best known as the Old Spaghetti Factory from 1970 – 2016

Shipping lines with facilities on Central Waterfront piers in the 1920s included local steamer companies, but also the Grand Trunk Pacific Steamship Company, the Royal Mail Steam Packet Company, the East Asiatic Steamship Company, the Cosmos Line, the Osaka Shoshen Kaisha, the Hamburg America Line, the Blue Funnel Line, and such mercantile tenants as Seattle Pacific Marine Supply and W. R. Grace and Company.

Although Seattle was hit hard by the Great Depression, development of the Central Waterfront did not come to a complete halt. Former livery stables continued to be converted to garages, the Black Ball Line brought a striking Art Deco motif to Colman Dock, and Gorst Air Transport operated seaplanes. The American Can Company built its massive building across from Pier 69, and the seawall was greatly extended in 1934.

During World War II, 29 shipyards operated in Seattle, though none of them on the Central Waterfront. This period also saw the introduction of fork lifts and pallets to move cargo. These marked the beginning of a change in shipping and quayside technology that would render the old piers obsolete. In 1946, E. H. Savage, president of the Port Commission, proposed demolishing the "Gold Rush period" piers and put forth the first of several schemes for "modern reinforced concrete structures, providing longitudinal mooring parallel to Alaskan Way", suitable for "large ocean-going vessels". These schemes were not adopted, and in the 1950s Seattle was a port in decline. The Port of Seattle had come to own most of the over-water structures on the Central Waterfront, but for the most part such shipping traffic as Seattle retained was using other piers and docks. Furthermore, construction of the Alaskan Way Viaduct in the early 1950s placed a visual barrier and a partial physical barrier between much of the Central Waterfront and the rest of Downtown.

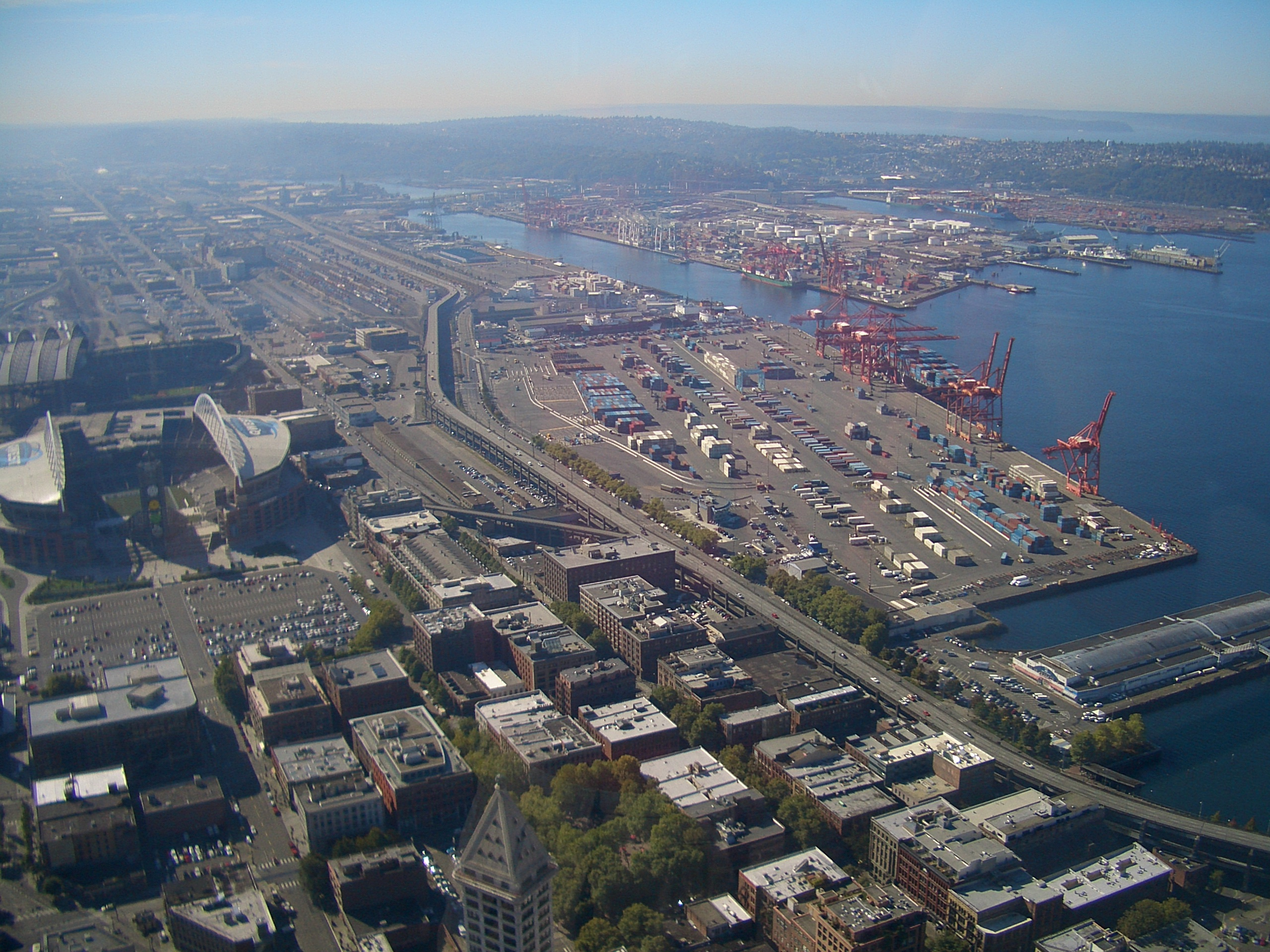
The container port. Pier 48 is in foreground at right.

With maritime activity moving elsewhere, especially to the new container port south of the Central Waterfront, people began to consider the potential importance of the Central Waterfront as a tourist destination. At the beginning of 1960, the only specifically tourist-oriented businesses on the Central Waterfront piers were Ye Olde Curiosity Shop (founded in 1899) and Ivar Haglund's Acre of Clams restaurant (founded in 1938). Another restaurant, the Cove, opened that year. Most of the plans proposed in this era foresaw demolishing all or nearly all of the historic piers. (In this same era, there were many proposals to demolish large numbers of Pioneer Square buildings, as well.) Proposed to take their place were such things as a sea circus, an aquarium, hotels and motels, a park, a marina, a heliport, a convention center, shops, restaurants, office buildings, and high rise apartments. One hotel, now The Edgewater, was built in 1962–63. Some of the visions from this era also included marine-supply stores, mooring for historic ships and a maritime museum. There was already criticism of the Alaskan Way Viaduct: architect Ibsen Nelson called it a "major built-in problem".

Tangible signs of revival began in the 1960s and accelerated in the 1970s and '80s. Several piers were reworked to contain shops and restaurants. Ted Griffin's Seattle Marine Aquarium was located on the western end of Pier 56 from 1962 to 1976, succeeded by the current Seattle Aquarium on Pier 59. All of these were achieved while preserving historic pier shed structures. The space once occupied by the Schwabacher Wharf, vacant for decades, became Waterfront Park. Also in this era, many historic buildings nearby on land were rehabilitated; several received city or federal historic designations. The bars and taverns along First Avenue "considered decrepit by some and colorful by others," gave way to new developments such as the Watermark Tower.

== Future ==
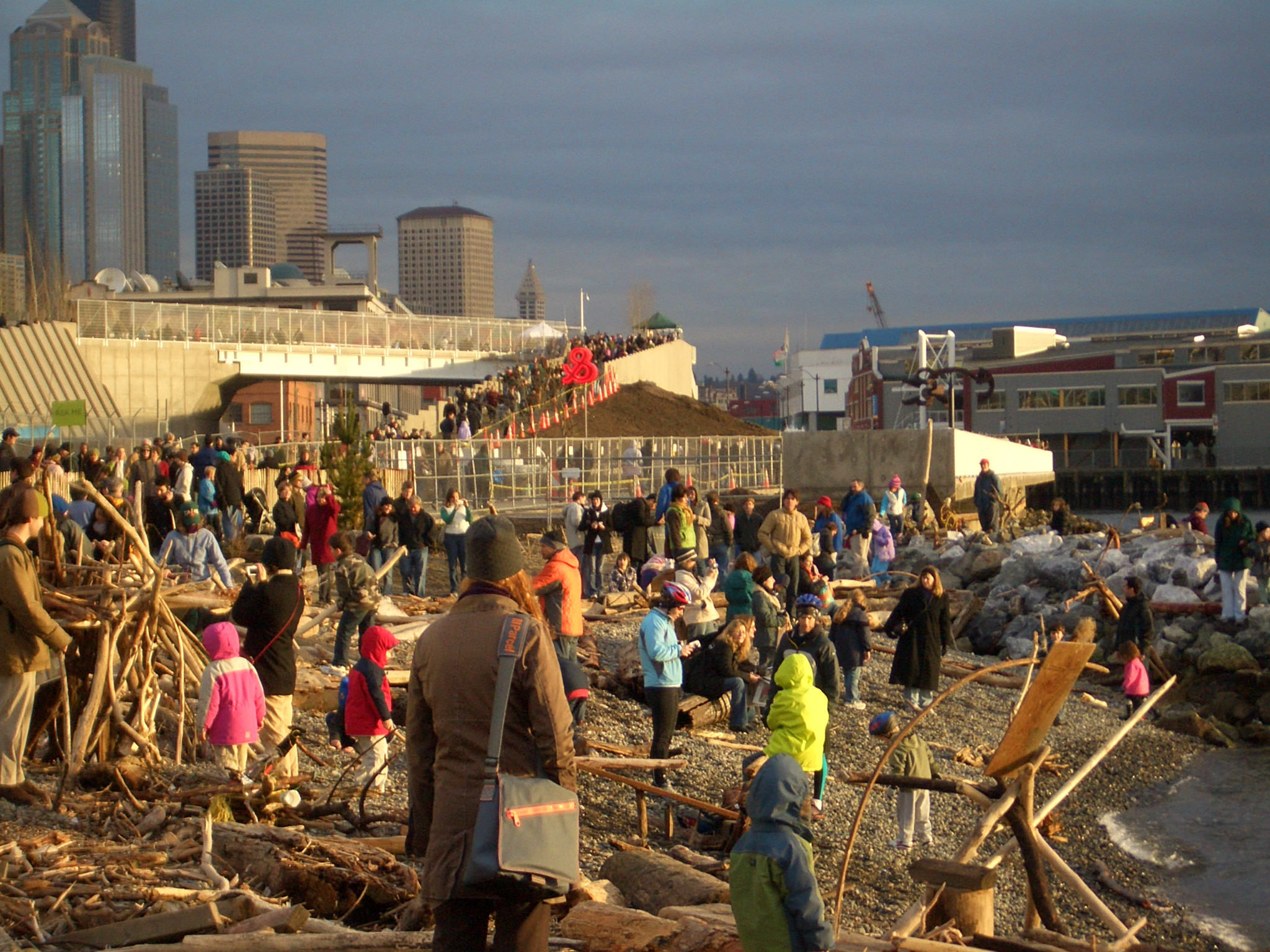
The Olympic Sculpture Park just north of the Central Waterfront has provided the first beachfront near Downtown in roughly a century.

While the many thwarted plans of the 1960s may constitute a warning about prognostication, the city has adopted an official Waterfront Concept Plan. The planning process behind this document began in 2003 and centered on a 300-person Visioning Charrette in February 2004, the largest event of its kind in the city's history. Aside from the city's process, plans are under consideration for major work at the Washington State Ferry terminal and the Seattle Aquarium; the Olympic Sculpture Park has already transformed the northern end of the Central Waterfront.

Some things about the future of the Central Waterfront are clear. The 2001 Nisqually earthquake revealed that the Alaskan Way Viaduct is unsound and the seawall is in very poor condition. Another earthquake could cause liquefaction of the soils, undermining the viaduct and placing massive pressure on the seawall. While there may be much question as to what will happen, there is no doubt that things cannot remain as they are. Elsewhere on the waterfront, the deteriorating Piers 62 and 63 also cannot remain as they are.

In 2008, the Washington State Department of Transportation considered eight scenarios for replacing the viaduct's Central Waterfront section, including three surface road options, two viaduct options (one with a park level over the traffic level), a bored tunnel, a cut-and-cover tunnel, and a lidded roadway. The bored tunnel option was selected the following year. The city's Department of Parks and Recreation is considering five different alternatives for replacing Piers 62 and 63, some of them integrated with specific replacement plans for the viaduct.

The State Route 99 tunnel opened in February 2019 following years of delay in construction. The Alaska way viaduct was torn down over the course of 2019, allowing for redevelopment of the waterfront area. Plans for the future waterfront, with construction into 2023, include a new Alaskan Way with bike lanes, an adjoining landscaped promenade, and pedestrian links from the waterfront and Pike Place Market.
