= Pike Street Hill Climb =

Stairway in Seattle, Washington, United States

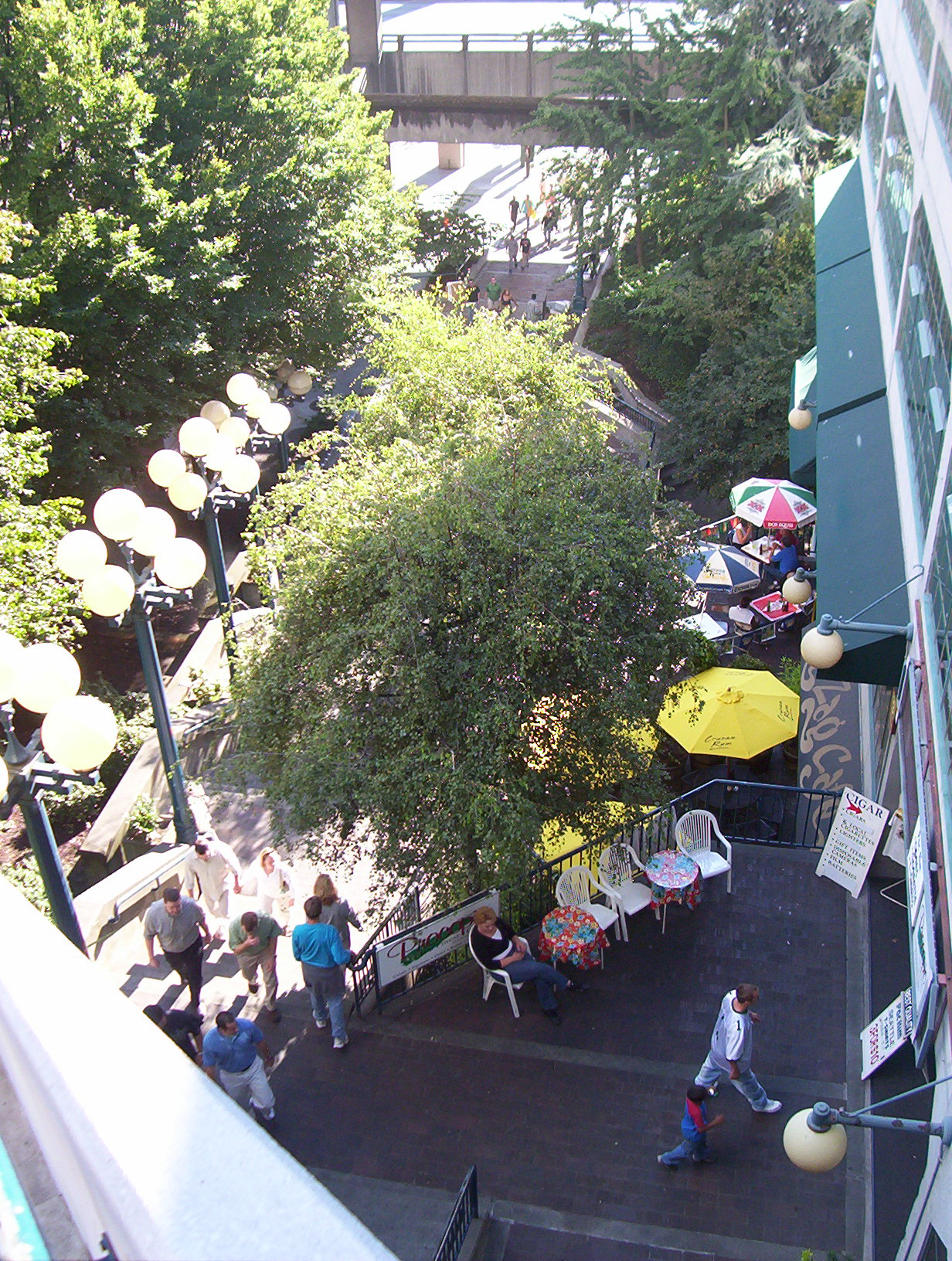
- Series of staircases, 2005
- Location: Seattle, Washington, U.S.
- Location within Washington (state)
- Coordinates: 47°36′29.5″N 122°20′29.5″W

The Pike Street Hill Climb, also known as Pike Street Hillclimb, is a pathway consisting of steps and escalators/elevators that connect Seattle's Alaskan Way and Central Waterfront along Elliott Bay to Pike Place Market in the U.S. state of Washington. The climb has been described by The Seattle Times as a "glute-burning short cut".

== Features ==
A series of cluster lights are installed along the climb.

Businesses along the climb have included the cocktail bar Zig Zag Café, the Mexican restaurant El Puerco Lloron, Procopio Gelateria, and other "chic shops and ethnic restaurants".

== See also ==
- Public stairways in Seattle
- Yesler Hillclimb
