= The Edgewater (Seattle) =

Hotel in Seattle, Washington, U.S.

Coordinates: 47°36′44.5″N 122°21′8″W

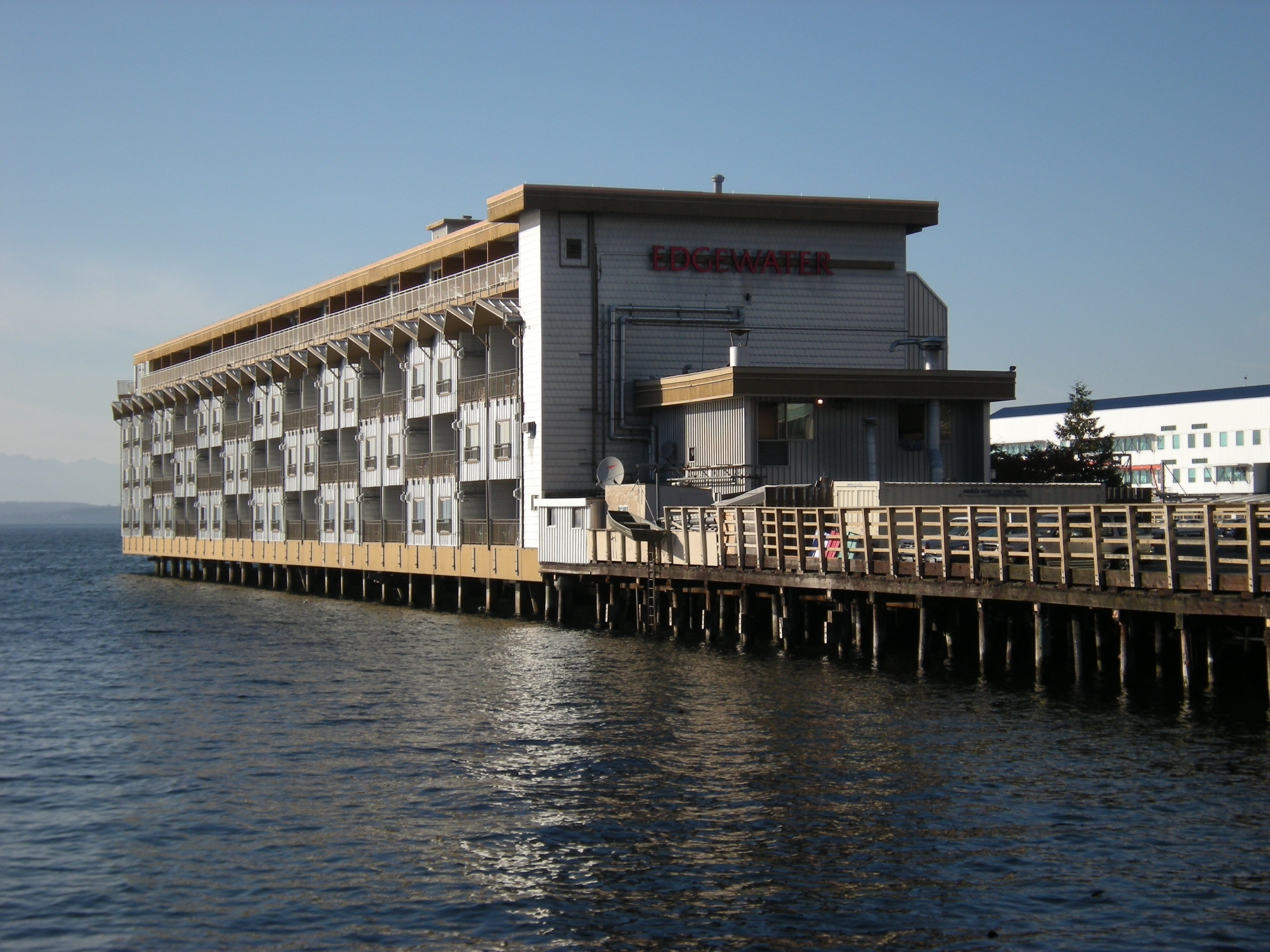
- Edgewater Hotel in 2008

General information
- Type: Hotel
- Location: Seattle, Washington, United States

Technical details
- Floor count: 4

The Edgewater (formerly the Edgewater Inn and, briefly when first constructed in 1962, the Camelot) is a four-story, 232-room hotel in Seattle, Washington, United States. It is located on the Central Waterfront on a pier over Elliott Bay (a bay of Puget Sound) and is the only over-water, and water-front hotel in the Seattle area. Shortly after it was built, shoreline zoning changes precluded the construction of further hotels on piers. In its early years, the hotel advertised on its north elevation that you could "fish from your room."

The hotel is particularly famous for hosting The Beatles when they visited Seattle in 1964 at the height of Beatlemania. Because of the Beatles' connection to the hotel, there is a Beatles-themed suite and the hotel has hosted several Beatles-related events and tributes in recent years. Other famous guests have included Led Zeppelin (who were banned from the hotel after their second infamous stay there), the Rolling Stones, Frank Zappa, Van Halen, Kurt Cobain, Black Sabbath and U.S. president Bill Clinton. The Edgewater is also a filming location in the 1992 season 3 episode "It Happened in Juneau" of Northern Exposure.

The hotel sits on the site of the onetime Galbraith-Bacon Pier, renamed Pier 67 during World War II. It also incorporates part of the area of the former Pier 68 (the Booth Fisheries Pier). Both old piers were demolished to build the hotel. The hotel was originally intended to open in time for the Century 21 Exposition, Seattle's 1962 world's fair. Originally named the Camelot, it soon became the Edgewater Inn (more recently, just The Edgewater).

The Edgewater sits partly on state-owned land. A lease from the state was renewed in 1988 and is good through 2018. As of 2008, it pays the state a rent of $330,000 a year or 3 percent of the hotel's gross receipts, whichever is greater. The lease requires the hotel owners to spend a minimum of $2 million on maintenance and refurbishing every five years.

The original architects were John Graham & Co. There have been two significant remodels: one in 1969 by James Barrington (Arcadia, California) and another in 1990 by Seattle's Callison Partnership.

The Edgewater is owned by Noble House Hotels & Resorts. The company also owned the Hotel Deca (formerly Edmond Meany Hotel, University Tower Hotel) in Seattle's University District.
