= Pier 55, Seattle =

Coordinates: 47°36′18″N 122°20′24″W

Pier 55
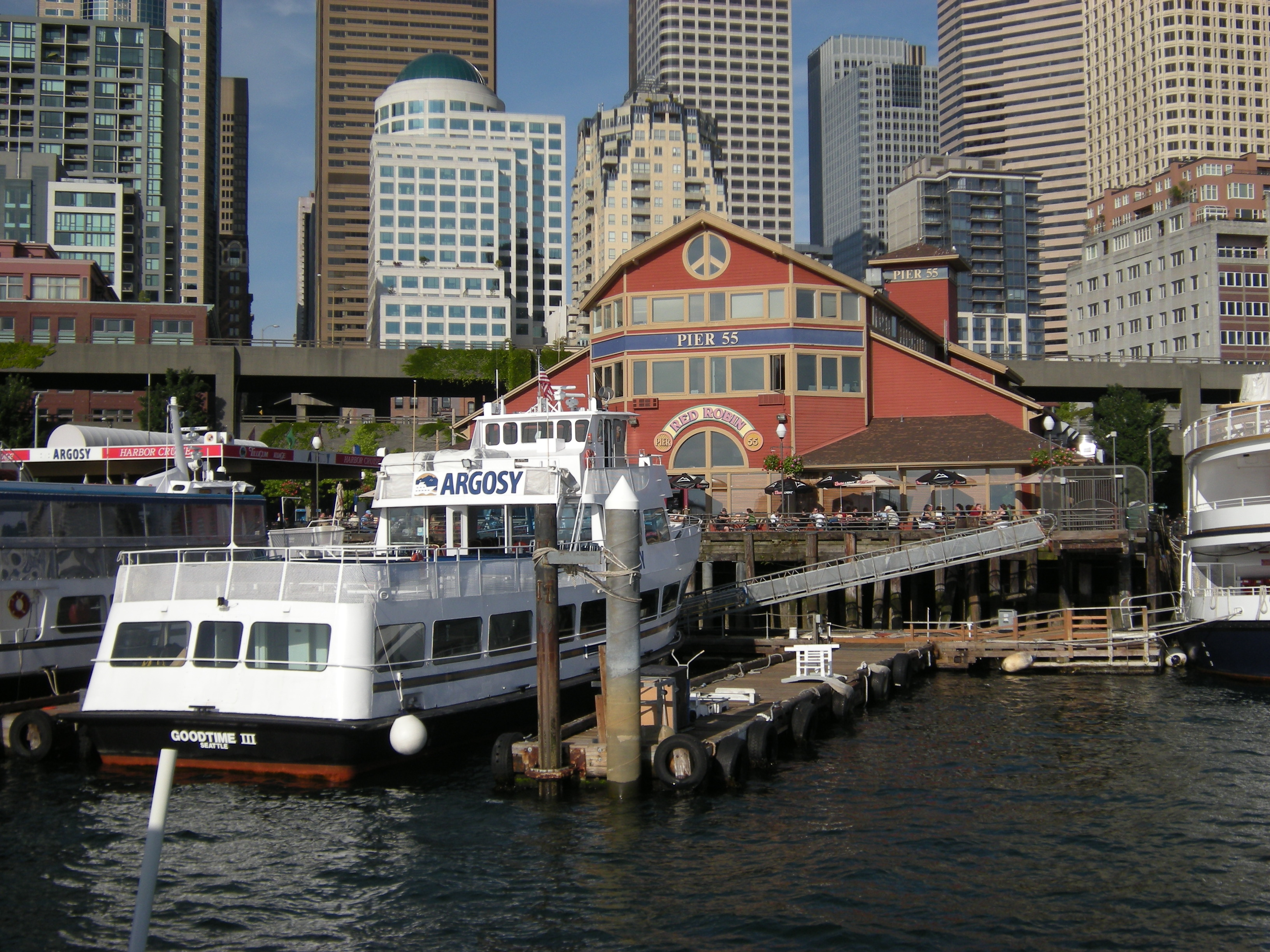
- Pier 55, June 2009
- Location: Seattle, Washington
- Owner: originally: Northern Pacific Rwy.

Characteristics
- Total length: 1917: 325 ft (99.1 m)
- Width: 1917: 100 ft (30.5 m)

Pier 55 is a pier in Seattle, Washington. Pier 55 was originally known as Pier 4 until it was renumbered during World War Two.

== Location ==
Pier 55 is located at the foot of Seneca Street. Pier 55 is the next pier to the south. Pier 56 is the next pier to the north.

== Construction ==
Pier 4 was at the foot of Seneca Street. In 1917, Pier 4, like Piers 1, 2, 3, and 5, was owned by the Northern Pacific Railway. 4 was operated by Dodwell Dock & Warehouse Co., owned by Dodwell & Co. (Hong Kong). Pier 4 was the terminus of the fleet of Border Line Transportation Co. Pier 4 measured 325 by 100 feet, with 750 feet of berthing space. Pier 4 also had a warehouse measuring 300 by 80 feet, with a cargo storage capacity of 8,000 tons. Alongside the pier the water was 40 feet deep at low tide. The pier had 750 feet of berthing space in 1917.

== History ==
Pier 55, at the foot of Spring Street, was originally named Pier 4. The first Pier 4, built in 1900, collapsed in September 1901, causing the loss of at least 1700 tons of freight. No one was killed in the accident, and the following year the Northern Pacific Railroad completed a new Pier 4, this time with better bracing, which survives today as the renamed Pier 55. Its first tenant, the Arlington Dock Company, was a shipping agent for passenger steamships to several West Coast cities and to Alaska, Asia and Europe.

In 1912 the pier was the terminal for local steamboat lines running to Poulsbo and Liberty Bay, Washington.

The pier was used for passenger service until around World War I. The Fisheries Supply Company became the principal tenant from at least 1938 to the 1980s. In 1945, the pier was remodeled. Structural improvements were made at that time by Melvin O. Sylliaasen and in the 1960s by the engineering firm Harvey Dodd and Associates. Further improvements were made in the late 1990s, along with some alterations to the exterior of the pier shed. During World War Two, Pier 3 was renumbered as Pier 55.

== 2025 shooting ==
A 32-year-old man was arrested for allegedly shooting a 68-year-old wheelchair-using man on July 31, 2025, after an argument allegedly ensued between the two over if the victim was wearing stolen valor. The shooting was caught on video, and many people at the pier rushed the scene as the shooting happened.

== Current status ==
Pier 55 is now used as the Seattle terminal for Argosy Cruises.

== See also ==
- Central Waterfront, Seattle
