= Northland Steamship Company =

Defunct American steamship line

The Northland Steamship Company was a small steamship line that sailed between ports on Puget Sound and Alaska.

In 1914, Northland Steamship was sailing two passenger ships totaling 1,700 gross register tons (GRT) from the Puget Sound Terminal in Seattle on the Southeast Alaskan Route, regularly visiting the ports of Ketchikan, Wrangell, Petersburg, Douglas, Juneau, Haines, Skagway and Seward in Alaska.
