= Wooden postcard =

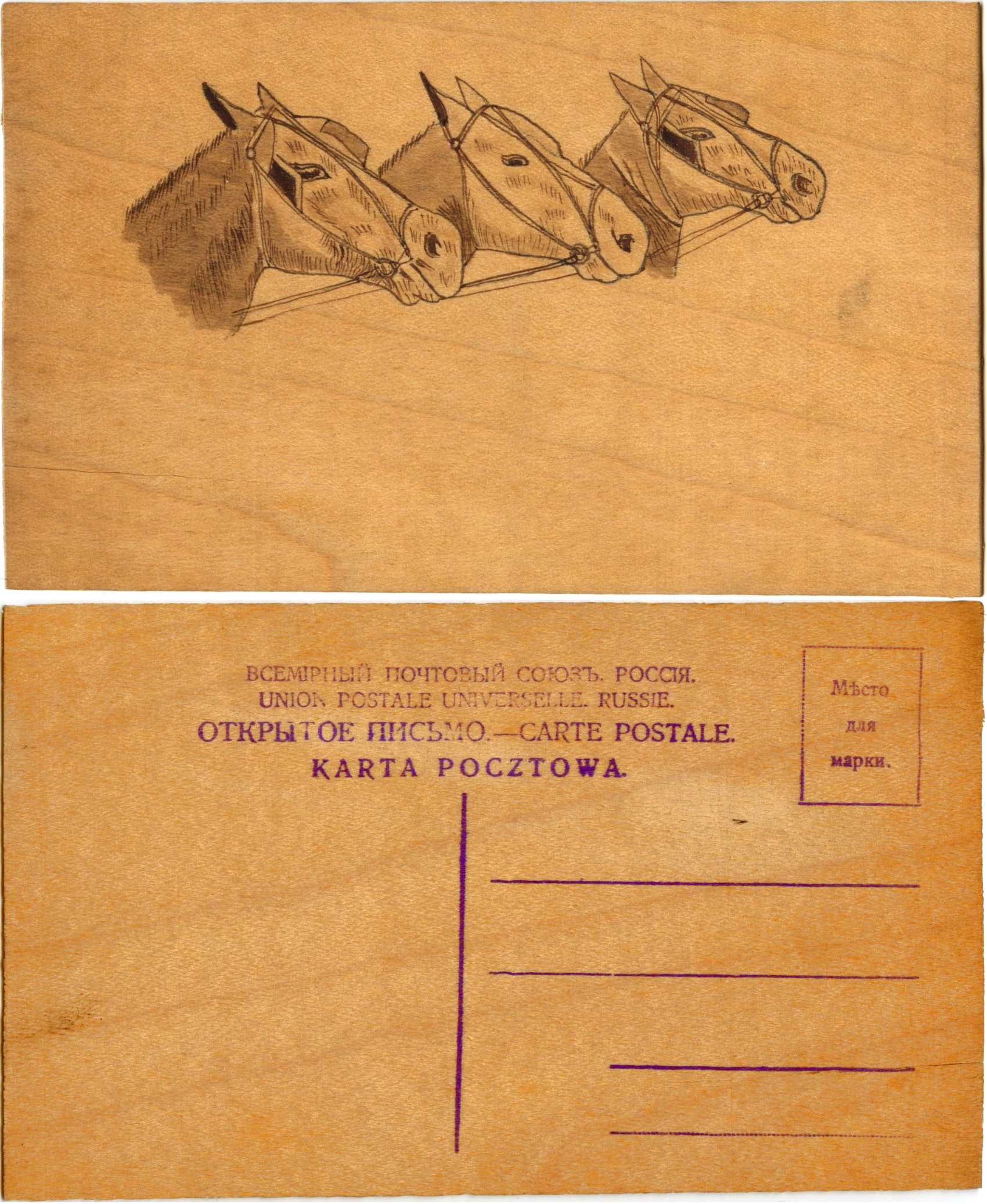
Wooden postcard of Russia (front and back)

Wood postcards have been produced and sold in the U.S. as keepsakes. Wooden postcards were sold for the 1904 St. Louis World's Fair held in Forest Park. Many included puns associated with wood: "Exposition is more than oak-a", "it is ash-tonishing", I wood spruce up and come", "You walnut regret it." and "Butternut delay". The Lewis and Clark Exposition of 1905 and the Jamestown Exposition of 1907 included wooden postcard souvenirs. The tradition of folksy puns continued in later wooden postcard lines. Others feature images, cartoons, advertisements and event commemorations.

== Information ==
Japanese Wood Novelty Co. in Providence, Rhode Island produced wooden postcards designed for photo insertion. They included gummed paper backing.

Bowman Studios was a Tampa, Florida based producer of cypress wood postcards in the 1940s. Images on their wooden postcards included azaleas, red hibiscus, pelicans and a Carolina landscape.

Many early wood postcards are printed with colored images while others were marked by pyrography (woodburning) or a combination of the two processes.

Wooden postcards usually require the one ounce letter rate postage. Thus the postage used can help date the cards, for example 3 Cent stamps were used for one ounce letters from 1932 to 1958. Wooden postcards light enough for the postcard rate required 1 cent postage until 1952; 2 cents from 1952 to 1958; and 3 cents from 1958 to 1963. The postage rates were once commonly printed on the cards.

Select wooden postcards with bas relief designs were made.

B.B. Quality Line produced bird's eye maple wooden postcards in Wisconsin, including Paul Bunyan themed cards. Grison's Steak & Chop House and Grison's Chicken House, restaurants in San Francisco, advertised its menu on wooden postcards for several years including 1939. Dixie Novelty Co. in Asheville, North Carolina produced World War II cartoon themed wooden postcards.
