= Don and Joe's Meats =

- Company type: Private
- Industry: Butcher, Retail
- Founded: 1924 (as Dan's Better Meats)
- Founder: Dan Zido
- Headquarters: Pike Place Market, Seattle, Washington, United States
- Products: Fresh meats, wild game, charcuterie

Don and Joe's Meats is a historic retail butchery located in the Main Arcade of Pike Place Market in Seattle, Washington. Originally established in 1924 as Dan's Better Meats, the shop is one of the oldest continuously operating businesses in the market district. It is known for its "open-air" counter service and its specialization in Pacific Northwest game and high-grade beef.

== History ==
=== Founding and the Zido Era (1916–1940s) ===
The shop's origins are tied to Dan Zido, a Polish immigrant who arrived in Seattle in 1906. After working at the Frye Packing Plant, Zido and a partner named Ziegler opened a butcher stall in the lower level ("Down Under") of Pike Place Market in 1916. In 1924, Zido moved the operation to its current location in the Main Arcade and renamed the business Dan's Better Meats.

=== Family Succession (1940s–1969) ===
Following Dan Zido’s retirement in the late 1940s, the business was purchased by his sons-in-law, Pete Cuper and Tom Sandal. After Cuper's death in 1951, Sandal operated the business until 1964. The shop remained in the family under Tom’s son, Dan Sandal, until 1969.

=== The Don and Joe Era (1969–2025) ===
In 1969, the business was purchased by Don Kuzaro Sr. and his brother-in-law, Joe Darby, who renamed the stall Don and Joe’s Meats. Don Kuzaro Jr. joined the business as a teenager that same year and eventually took over ownership in 1986.

The Kuzaro family maintained the shop's reputation as a cornerstone of the Market for over 55 years. Don Kuzaro Jr. retired in March 2025 after 56 years of service at the counter, a tenure that made him one of the longest-serving merchants in the history of Pike Place Market.

=== Modern Stewardship (2025–present) ===
In March 2025, the business was acquired by a new ownership group. This acquisition marked the first time since 1924 that the shop was not owned by descendants of the Zido or Kuzaro families.

== Products and Notability ==
Don and Joe's Meats is noted for its custom butchery approach and is a primary destination in the Seattle urban core for specialty wild game, including elk, venison, wild boar, and bison. The shop is a recurring subject in culinary tourism guides and historical surveys of Pike Place Market.
