= MarketFront =

Building in Seattle, Washington, U.S.

Coordinates: 47°36′34″N 122°20′34″W

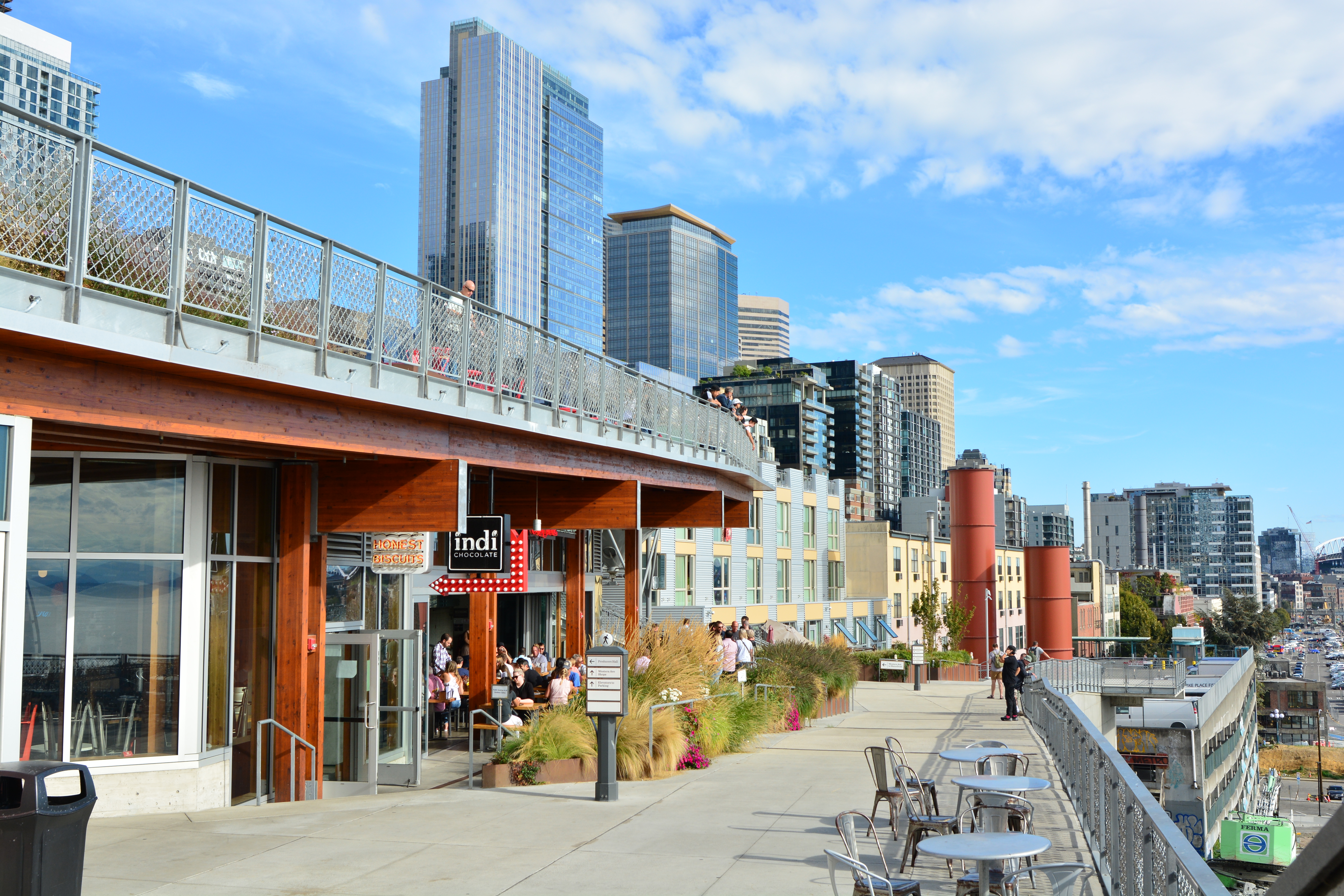
- Plaza on west side of MarketFront, 2019
- Interactive map of the MarketFront area

General information
- Completed: 2017
- Opened: 2017

The MarketFront is an addition to Seattle's Pike Place Market. Designed by Miller Hull Partnership, The $74 million expansion was unveiled in 2017. A grand opening was held on June 29. The MarketFront occupies the former site of the Municipal Market, demolished in 1974.

Billie the Piggybank, a 700-pound statue of a pig, was moved to the MarketFront development in late 2016.
