= Daily Dozen Doughnut Company =

Doughnut shop in Seattle, Washington, U.S.

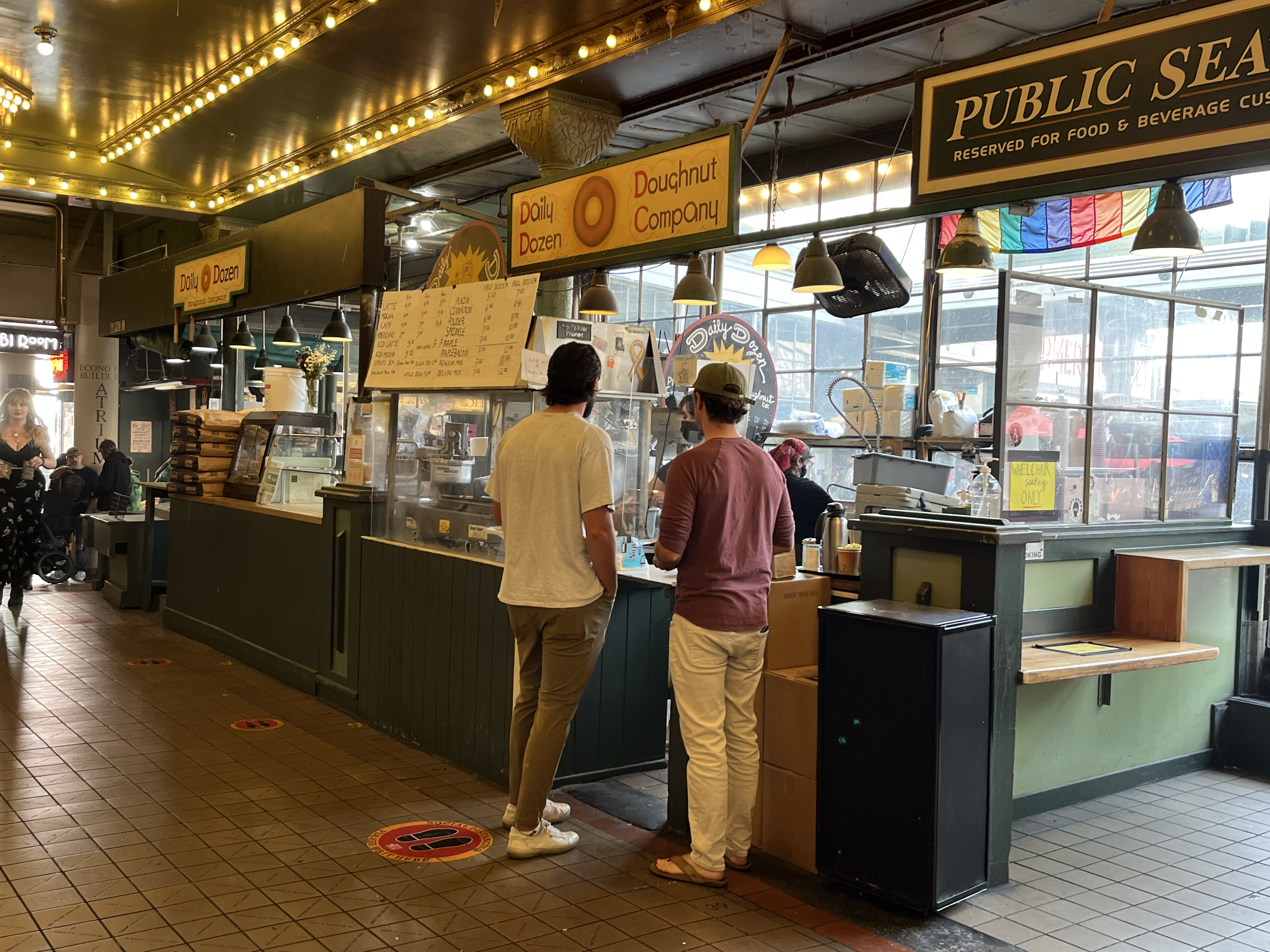
- The Daily Dozen Doughnut Company stall at Pike Place Market (2022)
- Interactive map of Daily Dozen Doughnut Company

Restaurant information
- Established: 1978
- Owner: Barbara Elza
- Previous owner: Todd Collins
- Location: 93 Pike Street, Seattle, Washington, U.S.
- Coordinates: 47.6087°N 122.3403°W

Daily Dozen Doughnut Company is a doughnut shop at Seattle's Pike Place Market, in the U.S. state of Washington. Established by two sisters in 1978, the stall in the Economy Market features a "Donut Robot", and is widely known for its hot, freshly made bite-sized doughnuts that are served in a paper bag. The business has been operated by Barbara Elza since c. 1989. Daily Dozen has garnered a generally positive reception and has been favorably included in several overviews of Seattle's best doughnuts.

== Description ==
Daily Dozen serves small doughnuts from a stall in the Economy Market building at Pike Place Market in Seattle's Central Waterfront district. Varieties have included plain, cinnamon, sugar, maple bacon, and chocolate with sprinkles, as well as seasonal specials. The doughnuts are typically doughnut holes, about the size of ping-pong balls, sold warm. Fodor's says Daily Dozen offers "adorable, made-while-you-watch minidoughnuts dusted in powdered sugar". The business's slogan is "Be a winner, have doughnuts for dinner".

An automated Belshaw Brothers Mark II machine invented in the 1930s called the "Donut Robot" creates doughnuts in rows of four. Described by the Chicago Tribune as a "mesmerizing contraption that plops rings of batter into oil", it sends the batter "down the oil river like the Jungle Cruise at Disneyland", and eventually flips the doughnuts "golden and bulbous onto cooling racks." Store staff will mix the donuts and their toppings together on the spot, shaking them in paper bags, and often tossing them in the air and catching them for added showmanship. The shop is cash-only.

== History ==
Daily Dozen was established by two sisters in 1978. The business is now owned by Barbara Elza, who has operated the shop since c. 1989. Previously, the business was owned by Todd Collins.

In 1997, the shop was processing 35 pounds (16 kg) of flour daily. The shop was reported to sell 40,000 doughnuts in a day in 2007 and an average of about 20,000 doughnuts per day in 2016.

In 2006, Seattle Weekly selected Daily Dozen for the "best place to pack on the pounds at a moment's notice" and said:

The hot, freshly made little gems are so deceptively nonthreatening and bite-sized that you tend to eat them like popcorn, which, in the ugly real world, can be the cause of a disturbing revelation when you look down into your paper bag and realize you've mowed your way through 12 doughnuts without so much as a burp. Powdered, chocolate-iced, sprinkled, or—our favorite—plain and golden, the goodies are a steal at a couple of bucks per dozen. But don't say we didn't warn you.

Hsiao-Ching Chou of the Seattle Post-Intelligencer included Daily Dozen in a 2006 overview of "can't miss bites" and recommended, "Make sure to bring a friend or you might consume the whole bag." The newspaper's Lynsi Burton included Daily Dozen in 2016 and 2018 overviews of the city's best doughnuts. The Seattle Post-Intelligencer included the doughnuts in a 2021 list of 26 "iconic Seattle bites". Stuart Eskenazi of The Seattle Times included Daily Dozen in a 2007 overview of "favorites for kids" at Pike Place Market.

In 2008, Bon Appétit's Diane Chang wrote, "Enter Pike Place Market and you'll instantly be hit with the mouthwatering aroma of freshly fried batter... Their recipe hasn't changed for almost 20 years—nor have their lines gotten any shorter." Daily Dozen was not listed in Andrew Knowlton's 2010 overview of "America's best donuts" for Bon Appétit, but was subsequently included in his follow-up list of reader recommendations. In 2013, KOMO-TV's Lindsay Cohen described the shop as "a Pike Place Market mainstay for nearly 30 years". Daily Dozen topped KSTW's 2018 list of Seattle's top five doughnut shops. Allecia Vermillion of the Seattle Metropolitan included the business in a 2022 overview of the city's best doughnuts.

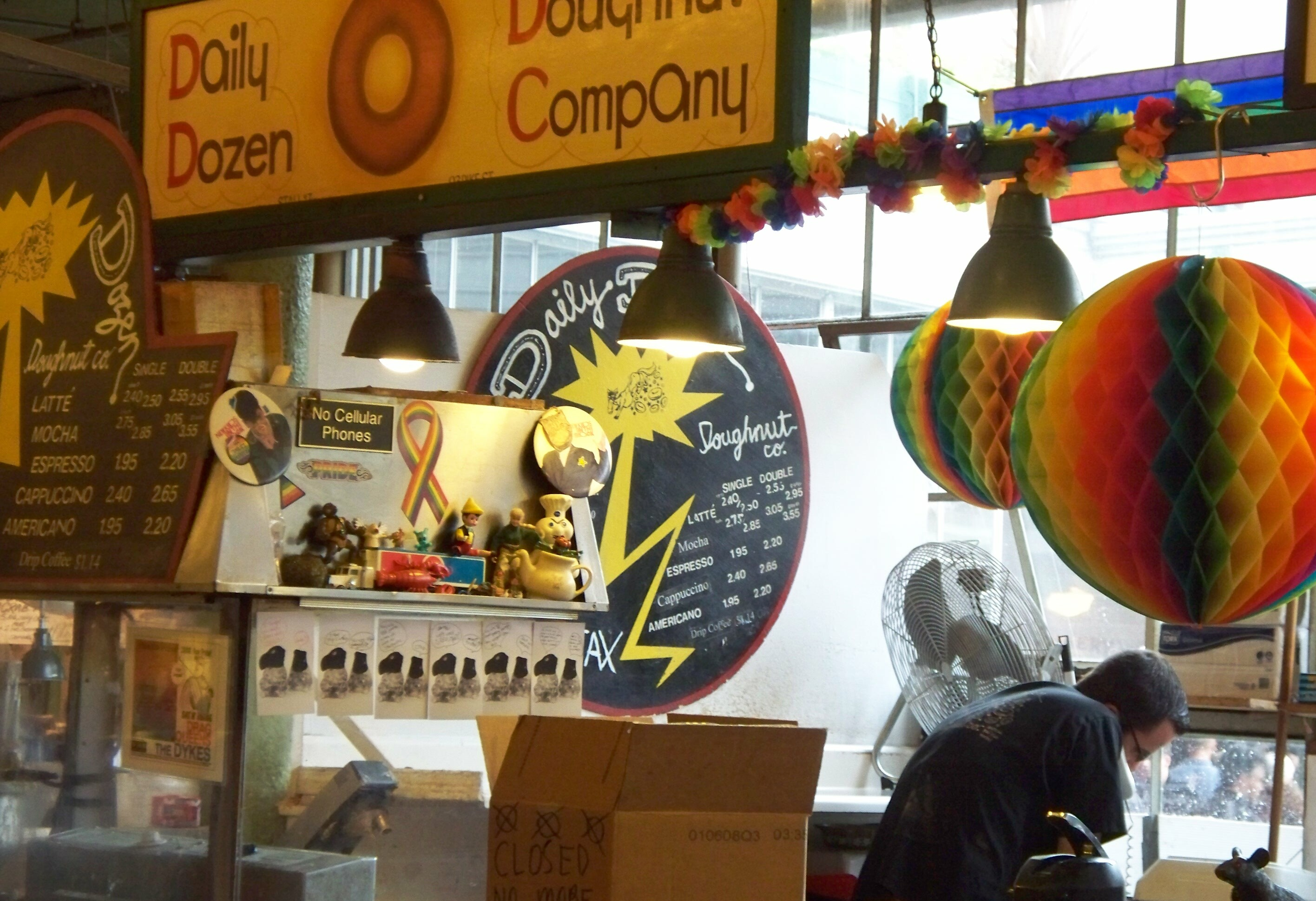
A rainbow flag and other colorful decorations displayed at the stall

In June 2009, Elza put up a rainbow flag behind the Daily Dozen counter for Pride Month, and received a call from her landlord a week later, asking her to take it down. The dispute was soon covered by The Stranger, and the Pike Place Market Preservation and Development Authority (PDA) was flooded with angry phone calls. Elza presented her case to the PDA and the Pike Place Market Historical Commission, and was given permission to display the flag each year in June. However, in July 2012, she decided to leave the flag up indefinitely, triggering further discussions with the authority.

In April 2012, the shop applied to expand into an adjacent space, formerly rented by a dried-fruit company. The shop owners aimed to expand the business into selling quick breads, hand-held potpies, cider, and coffee. In July 2012, The Seattle Times noted that Daily Dozen did more than half of its business with locals rather than tourists. In 2020, during the COVID-19 pandemic, the business received Paycheck Protection Program funding from the Small Business Administration, retaining seven employees. In 2022, to commemorate Pike Place Market's 115th anniversary, the business gave free doughnuts and beverages to the first 115 guests on August 17.

In 2012, the business inspired entrepreneurs to open Beavers Coffee + Donuts, a food truck in Chicago, Illinois. The food truck also makes use of a "doughnut robot" machine to cook the doughnuts. The Patriot-News of the Harrisburg–Carlisle area in Pennsylvania noted in 2012 that Maria DAgostino, owner of a local doughnut stand, had apprenticed at the "well-known" Daily Dozen Doughnuts.

The Daily Meal included the business in 2010 and 2012 lists of the best donut shops in the United States. Ed Levine of Serious Eats notes that the fact that the mini doughnuts are "actually plucked from the Donut Robot 'conveyer belt'" may mean they have "a little more oil, but we won't complain".

== See also ==
- List of doughnut shops
- List of restaurants in Pike Place Market
