= Pike Place Fish Market =

Fish market in Seattle, Washington, U.S.

Coordinates: 47°36′33.93″N 122°20′30.12″W

- Type: Private
- Industry: Seafood
- Founded: 1930
- Headquarters: 86 Pike Place; Seattle, Washington, U.S.
- Owners: Jaison Scott, Ryan Reese, Samuel Samson, Anders Miller
- Website: http://pikeplacefish.com

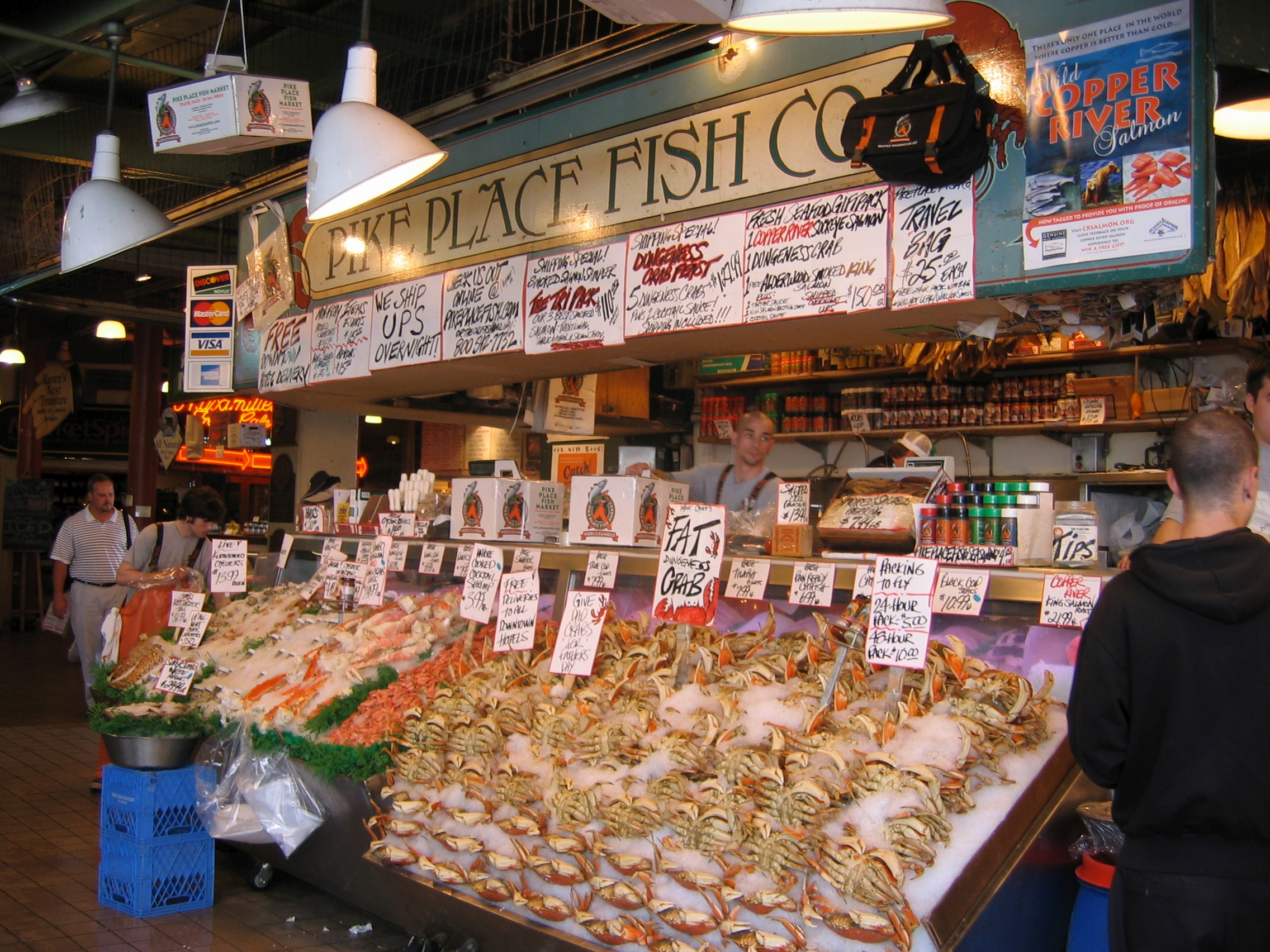
Pike Place Fish Market

Pike Place Fish Market is an open-air fish market at Pike Place Market in Seattle, Washington, United States, located at the corner of Pike Street and Pike Place. Founded in 1930, it is known for its tradition of fishmongers throwing the fish purchased by customers before wrapping it. The fish market was near bankruptcy in 1986, but after the introduction of new practices such as the fish throwing, games, and customer performances, it received exposure in national media and on television shows. Today, Pike Place Fish Market is a world-famous tourist destination, attracting up to 10,000 daily visitors.

== History ==
The Pike Place Fish Market was purchased in 1965 by John Yokoyama, a former employee of the fish market who believed the purchase would ultimately enable him to afford the car payments on his new Buick Riviera. Little known beyond the Seattle area, the market was nearly bankrupt in 1986, when Yokoyama and his staff sought advice from consultant Jim Bergquist.

At a meeting with Bergquist, an employee suggested that they attempt to make the market "world famous", with the ideas for the business' flying and thrown fish, games with customers, and staff attitudes of always enjoying their work, so that customers would as well. In an interview, Yokoyama said, "We took a stand that we were going to become world famous. We just said it and it became so."

The bronze piggy-bank sculpture nicknamed "Rachel", a popular symbol of the market, was created by Whidbey Island sculptor Georgia Gerber in 1986. It raises about $10,000 per year in donations for housing and services in low income areas.

Four years later, in 1990, Ted Turner's Goodwill Games were held in Seattle. News crews at the Pike Place Market discovered the fish market and its performances with customers, and they filmed them. Soon afterwards, the fish market appeared on Good Morning America, leading to the business and its employees being filmed by various film crews, and being featured in numerous magazines.

Today, the fishmongers at Pike Place Fish Market perform in front of up to 10,000 visitors a day during the summer tourist season. Another popular feature of the Fish Market is the monkfish, which sometimes is made to "snap" at customers by use of a hidden line. The success of the business has been attributed to its human resources and employee attitudes. The Fish Market's employees are known to give motivational speeches at businesses, civic groups and schools, and have been featured in various motivational books.

In 1991, CNN named the Pike Place Fish Market as one of the three most fun places to work in America. It was bought by four of its former employees in 2018. Between 2019 and November 2013, the market had failed health inspections nine times. Some of the reapeated violation was for failing to keep seafood at proper temperature which could cause sickness.

== Fish throwing ==
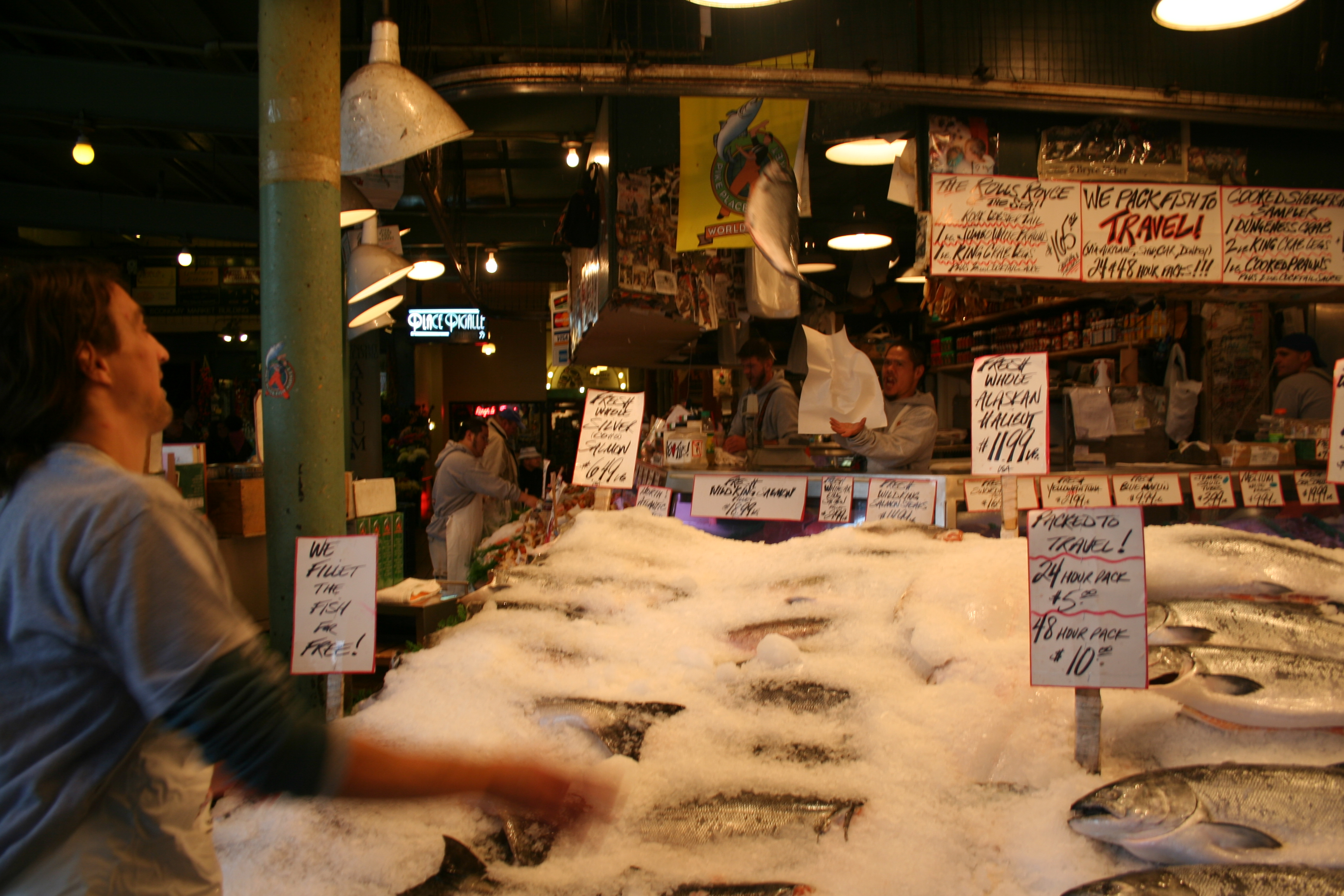
A salmon in flight

The Pike Place Fish Market is widely known for its custom of hurling customers' orders across the shopping area. A typical routine will involve a customer ordering a fish; the fishmongers in orange rubber overalls and boots will call out the order which is loudly shouted back by all the other staff, at which point the original fishmonger will throw the customer's fish behind the counter to be wrapped. The repeated shouting of fish orders started out as a prank on one employee, but became a tradition as the display was enjoyed by customers. When at work, the fish market's staff continually yell to each other and chant in unison while throwing ordered fish. Occasionally they will throw a foam fish into the crowd to scare bystanders, or select a customer from the crowds to participate in the fish toss. The market displays a sign in the general area which reads "Caution: Low Flying Fish".

== Films, books and popular culture ==
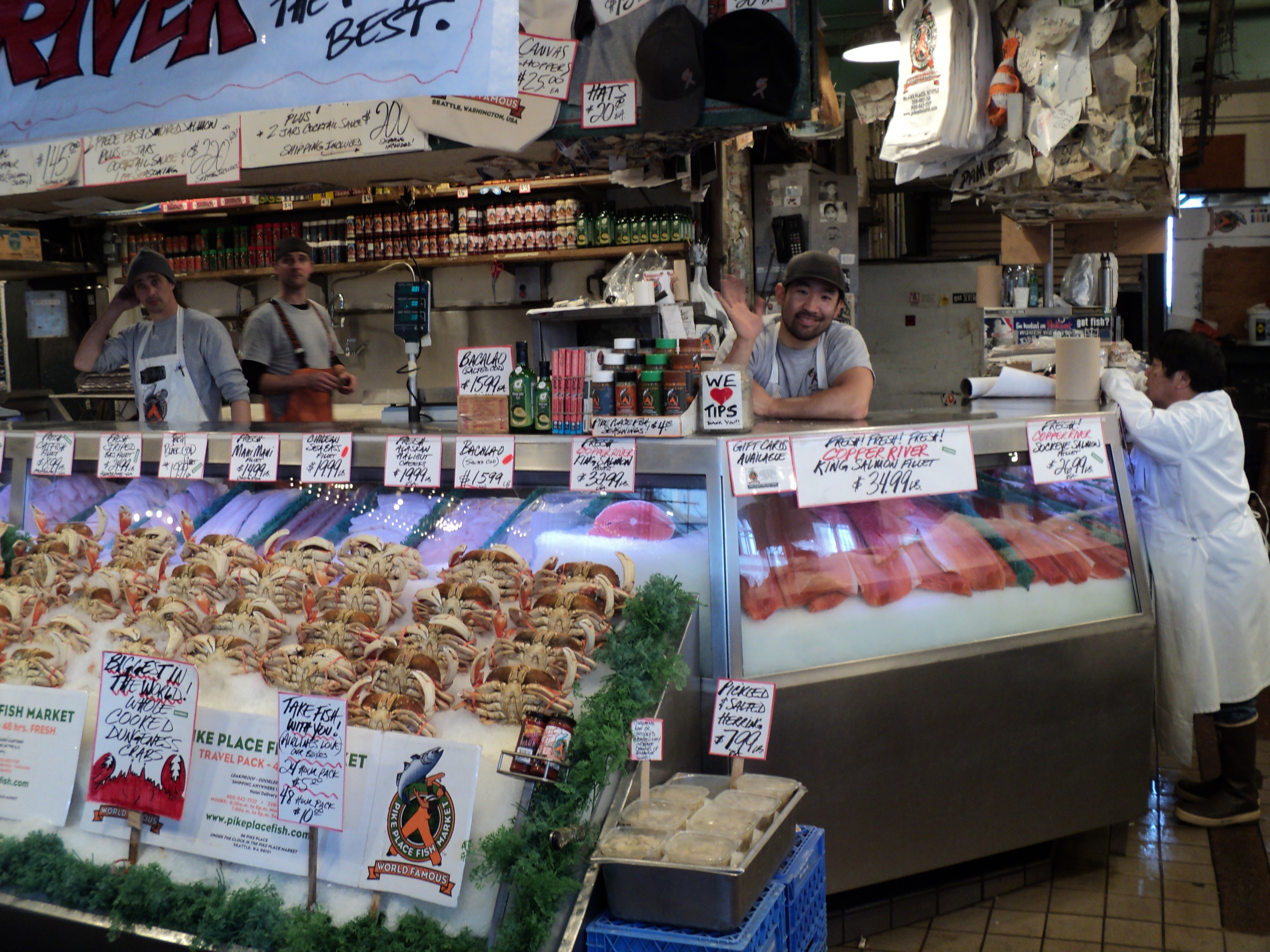
Taho, longtime employee, staffing the counter

In 1998, the Pike Place Fish Market was the subject of a documentary film and accompanying book, FISH! Philosophy. The Pike Place Fish Market has also been the setting for several best-selling corporate training videos, the aforementioned FISH!, and also FISH!Sticks, which have been used by firms such as Enterprise Rent-A-Car, Sprint Nextel, Southwest Airlines, Sainsbury's, Saturn, and Scottish and Southern Energy, for employee training. The Pike Place Fish Market has been featured in a variety of television shows and commercials. These include a Spike Lee Levis jeans commercial; MTV's The Real World; NBC's Frasier, and ABC's Good Morning America. In films, they have appeared in Free Willy. Reference to the Pike Place Fish Market is also made by American hip hop duo Macklemore & Ryan Lewis in their 2015 single "Downtown" featuring Eric Nally, Melle Mel, Kool Moe Dee and Grandmaster Caz.
