= Economy Market =

Building at Pike Place Market in Seattle, Washington, U.S.

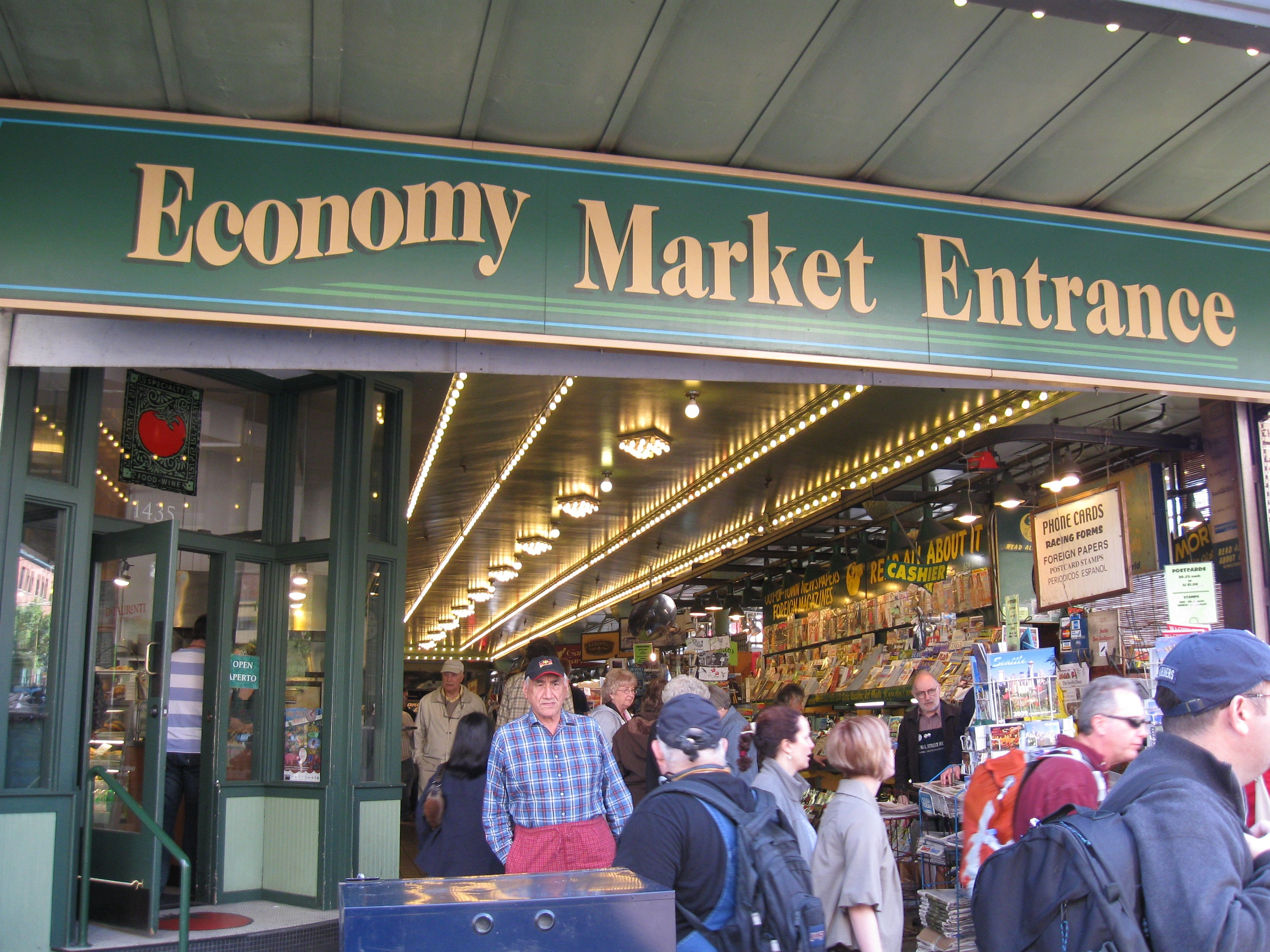
- Entrance to the building, 2008
- Interactive map of the Economy Market area

General information
- Location: Pike Place Market, Seattle, Washington, United States
- Coordinates: 47°36′31″N 122°20′25″W

The Economy Market (sometimes the Economy Market Building) is a building at Seattle's Pike Place Market, in the U.S. state of Washington.

Previously known as the Bartell Building, the structure was completed in 1900. The building was originally used as stables for the farmers' horses. The building took its modern name from its historical purpose as a discount or day-old section of the market.

Businesses operating in the building include the Daily Dozen Doughnut Company and Tenzing Momo.
