= Tenzing Momo =

Shop at Pike Place Market in Seattle, Washington, U.S.

Coordinates: 47.6086°N 122.3401°W

- Logo

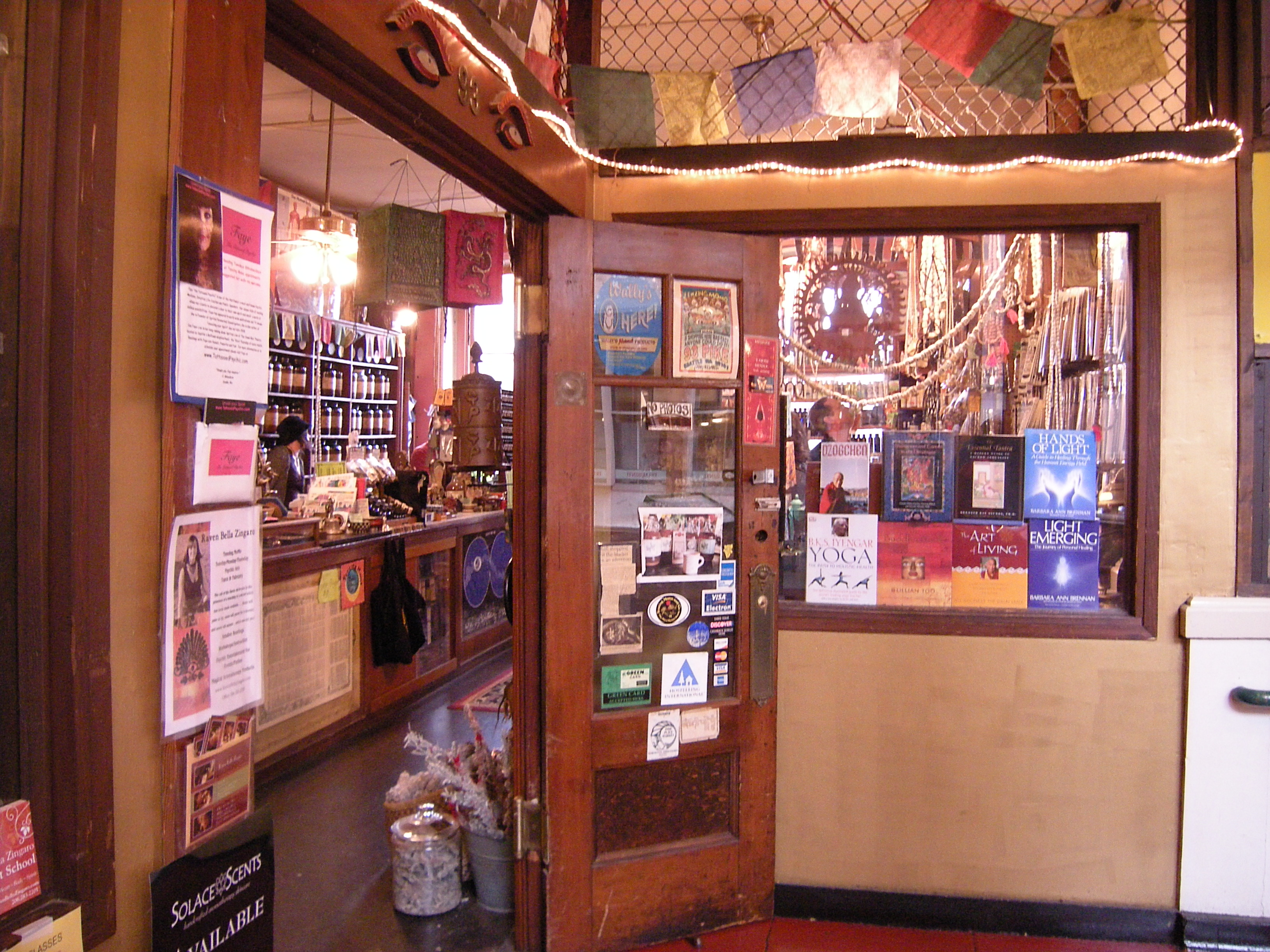
- The shop in 2008
- Website: tenzingmomo.com

Tenzing Momo is a shop in Seattle's Pike Place Market, in the U.S. state of Washington.

== Description ==
Tenzing Momo is a shop in the Economy Market building at Seattle's Pike Place Market. Ellie White of KOMO-TV and Seattle Refined has described the shop as a "Tibetan apothecary". Lonely Planet says, "Doing a good impersonation of one of the magic shops in Diagon Alley from the Harry Potter books, Tenzing Momo is an old-school natural apothecary with shelves of mysterious glass bottles filled with herbs and tinctures to treat any ailment." According to Seattle Refined, the business stocks approximately 300 herbs (Ayurvedic, Chinese, and Western) and 300 essential oils. In addition to dried herbs, the store carries spices, mixers, incense, bath products, tarot cards, and all-natural remedies.

The Seattle Times has described the shop as "the West Coast's oldest, largest herbal apothecary". The newspaper's Connie McDougall wrote, "Who can resist a shop with the translated name of 'divine dumpling'? Tenzing, a Tibetan title, means illustrious or divine, and momo is a yak-filled dumpling, so says manager Erik Smith... Tenzing Momo also claims to have the largest selection in town of essential oils as well as vast rows of medicinal herbs."

== Reception ==
Connie McDougall of The Seattle Times called the shop "exotic as they come ... both practical and profound". In 2008, Maggie Dutton of Seattle Weekly wrote:

Over its three decades of existence, Tenzing Momo ... has become a one-stop shop for the alterna-minded... But it can function as more than just a pit-stop for vacationing hippies or angst-ridden teen witches if you let it—the store's staff are herbal sommeliers. Normally the sight of prayer flags and the smell of incense repel me, but the store’s herbs and other products, along with the knowledgeable service, have made Tenzing Momo part of my regular routine... Just as a great wine shop will help you more and more as they get to know your tastes, so will Tenzing Momo with what ails or occupies you. All you have to do is brave the market horde to their quiet corner and shed all preconceived notions.
