= Pike Place Market =

Public market in Seattle, Washington

- Pike Place Public Market Historic District
- U.S. National Register of Historic Places
- U.S. Historic district
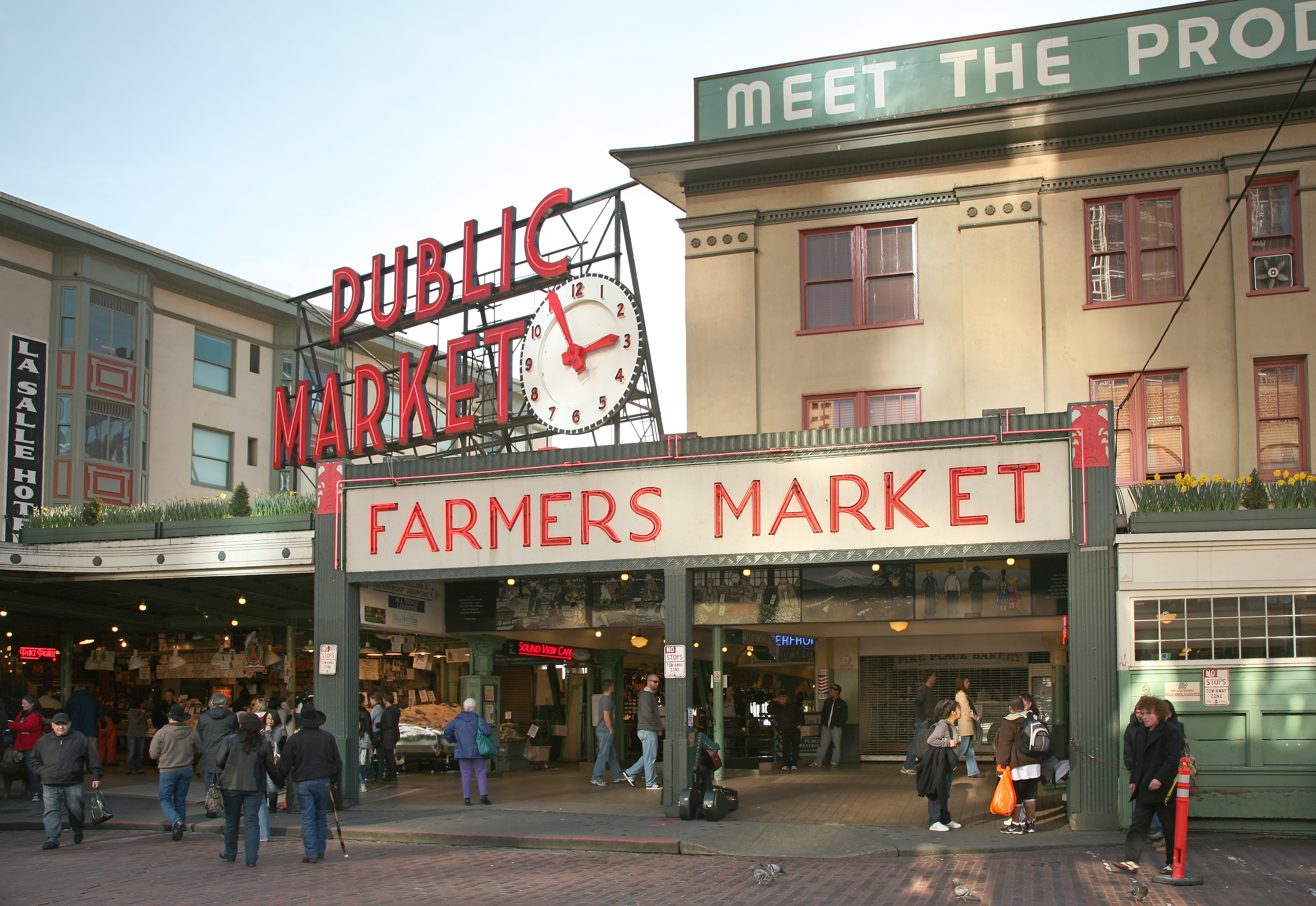

- Location within Downtown Seattle
- Location: Seattle, Washington, U.S.
- Coordinates: 47°36′34″N 122°20′30″W
- Built: 1903, 1910, 1971
- Architect: Frank Goodwin
- Website: pikeplacemarket.org
- NRHP reference No.: 70000644
- Added to NRHP: March 13, 1970

Pike Place Market is a public market in Seattle, Washington, United States. It opened on August 17, 1907, and is one of the older continuously operated public farmers' markets in the United States. Overlooking the Elliott Bay waterfront on Puget Sound, it serves as a place of business for many small farmers, craftspeople and merchants. It is named for its central street, Pike Place, which runs northwest from Pike Street to Virginia Street on the western edge of Downtown Seattle. Pike Place Market is Seattle's most popular tourist destination, with more than 20 million annual visitors.

The Market is built on the edge of a steep hill and consists of several lower levels located below the main level. Each features a variety of unique shops such as antique dealers, comic book and collectible shops, small family-owned restaurants, and one of the oldest head shops in Seattle. The upper street level contains fishmongers, fresh produce stands and craft stalls operating in the covered arcades. Local farmers and craftspeople sell year-round in the arcades from tables they rent from the Market on a daily basis, in accordance with the Market's mission and founding goal: allowing consumers to "Meet the Producer".

Pike Place Market is home to nearly 500 residents who live in eight different buildings throughout the Market. Most of these buildings have been low-income housing in the past; however, some of them no longer are, such as the Livingston Baker apartments. The Market is run by the quasi-governmental Pike Place Market Preservation and Development Authority (PDA).

== Location and extent ==
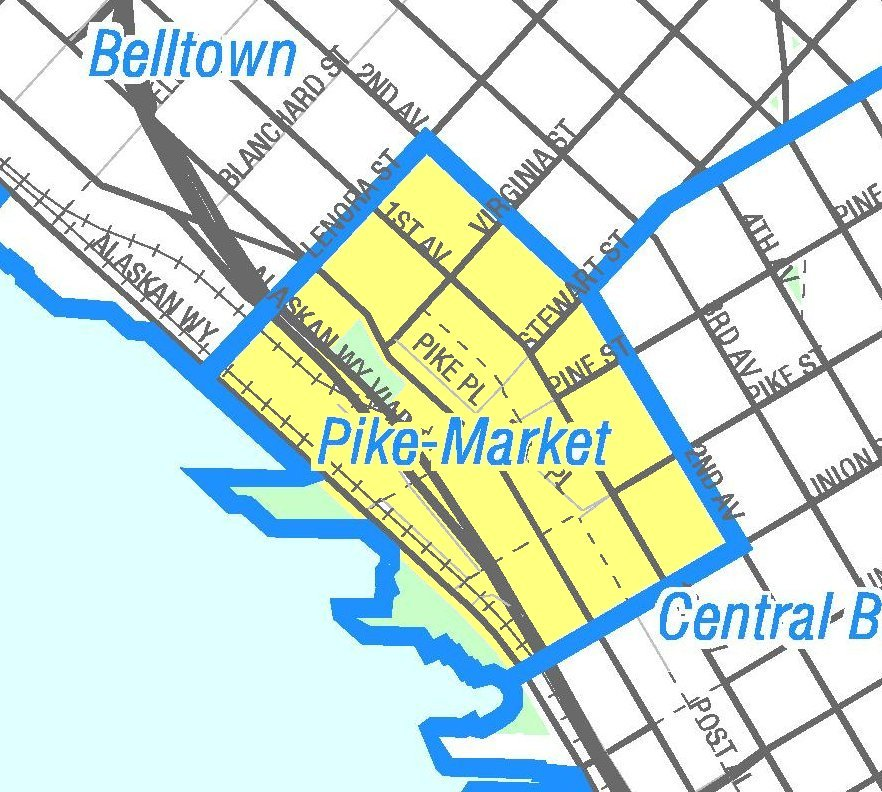
"Pike-Market" neighborhood as represented in the City Clerk's Seattle Neighborhood Atlas. The heavy line on the map labeled "Alaskan Way Viaduct" was part of Washington State Route 99 (SR 99) prior to the viaduct's demolition in 2019. The unlabeled street inland from SR 99 as it passes the market is Western Avenue.

The Market is located roughly in the northwest corner of Seattle's central business district. To its north is Belltown. To its southwest are the central waterfront and Elliott Bay. Boundaries are diagonal to the compass since the street grid is roughly parallel to the Elliott Bay shoreline.

As is common with Seattle neighborhoods and districts, different people and organizations draw different boundaries for the market. The City Clerk's Neighborhood Map Atlas gives one of the more expansive definitions, defining a "Pike-Market" neighborhood extending from Union Street northwest to Virginia Street and from the waterfront northeast to Second Avenue. Despite coming from the City Clerk's office, this definition has no special official status.

The smaller "Pike Place Public Market Historic District" listed on the U.S. National Register of Historic Places is bounded roughly by First Avenue, Virginia Street, Western Avenue, and a building wall about halfway between Union and Pike Streets, running parallel to those streets.

In a middle ground between those two definitions, the Seattle Department of Neighborhoods' official 7-acre (28,000 m^{2}) "Pike Place Market Historical District" includes the federally recognized Pike Place Public Market Historic District plus a slightly smaller piece of land between Western Avenue and Washington State Route 99, on the side of the market toward Elliott Bay.

To some extent, these different definitions of the market district result from struggles between preservationists and developers. For example, the National Historic Preservation Act of 1966 created the Washington Advisory Council on Historic Preservation. Victor Steinbrueck, at one point in the late 1960s, convinced the Advisory Council to recommend designating 17 acres (69,000 m^{2}) as a historical district. Pressure by developers and the "Seattle establishment" soon got that reduced to a tenth of that area. The present-day historic district designations lie between these extremes.

Part of the market sits on what was originally mudflats below the bluffs west of Pike Place. In the late 19th century, West Street (now Western Avenue, angling away from Pike Place) was already a through street running more or less parallel to the shore. Railroad Avenue (now Alaskan Way) was built farther out on pilings; it was not filled in until the 1930s. Nearby piers with warehouses for convenient stevedoring had already been completed by 1905, two years before the market opened.

== History ==
The market was created in 1907 when Seattle City Council member Thomas P. Revelle took advantage of an 1896 ordinance that allowed the city to designate tracts of land as public markets and designated a portion of the area of Western Avenue above the Elliott Bay tideflats off Pike Street and First Avenue. The market was opened August 17, 1907, by City Council President Charles Hiram Burnett Jr. The first building at the Market, the Main Arcade, opened November 30, 1907.

Demand for stalls grew and by 1911 the number of available stalls had doubled. The west side of the stall lines were soon covered in an overhead canopy and roofing, becoming known as the "dry row". In 1916 the market expanded into the Economy Market.

Throughout the early 1920s, the north side of the Corner Market became known as the Sanitary Market and the area developed into a social scene. A new ordinance forbidding farmers' stalls to be placed in the street resulted in proposals to move the market, but in 1921 the City Council voted to retain the existing location and work on expanding in place.

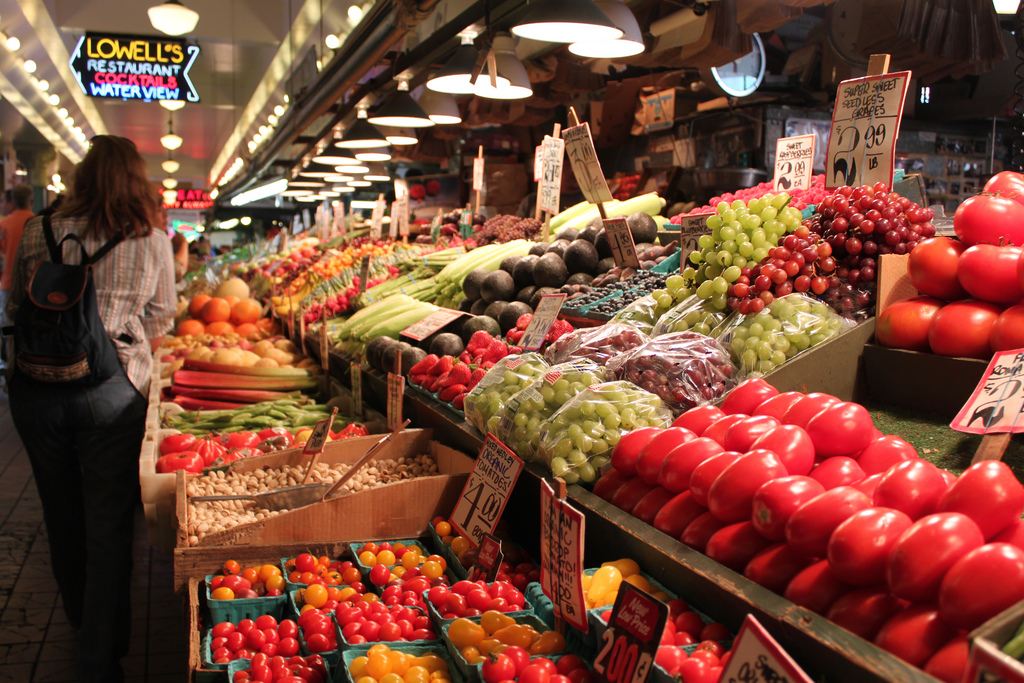
An assortment of fruits available for sale

In 1963, a proposal was floated to demolish Pike Place Market and replace it with Pike Plaza, which met community opposition, including help from Betty Bowen, Victor Steinbrueck, Ibsen Nelsen, and others from the board of Friends of the Market. An initiative was passed on November 2, 1971, that created a historic preservation zone and returned the Market to public hands.

In the 1980s, a nonprofit group, the Pike Place Market Foundation, was established by the PDA to raise funds and administer the Market's free clinic, senior center, low-income housing, and childcare center. The 1983 Hildt Amendment or Hildt Agreement (named after City Council member Michael Hildt) struck a balance between farmers and craftspeople in the daystalls which set a precedent for allocation of daystalls.

In 1998, the PDA decided to end the Hildt Agreement; a new agreement, the Licata-Hildt agreement, was adopted in February 1999.

In 2008, Seattle voters approved a six-year property-tax levy to fund critical repairs and improvements, which were completed in 2012.

== Operation ==
=== Organizations ===
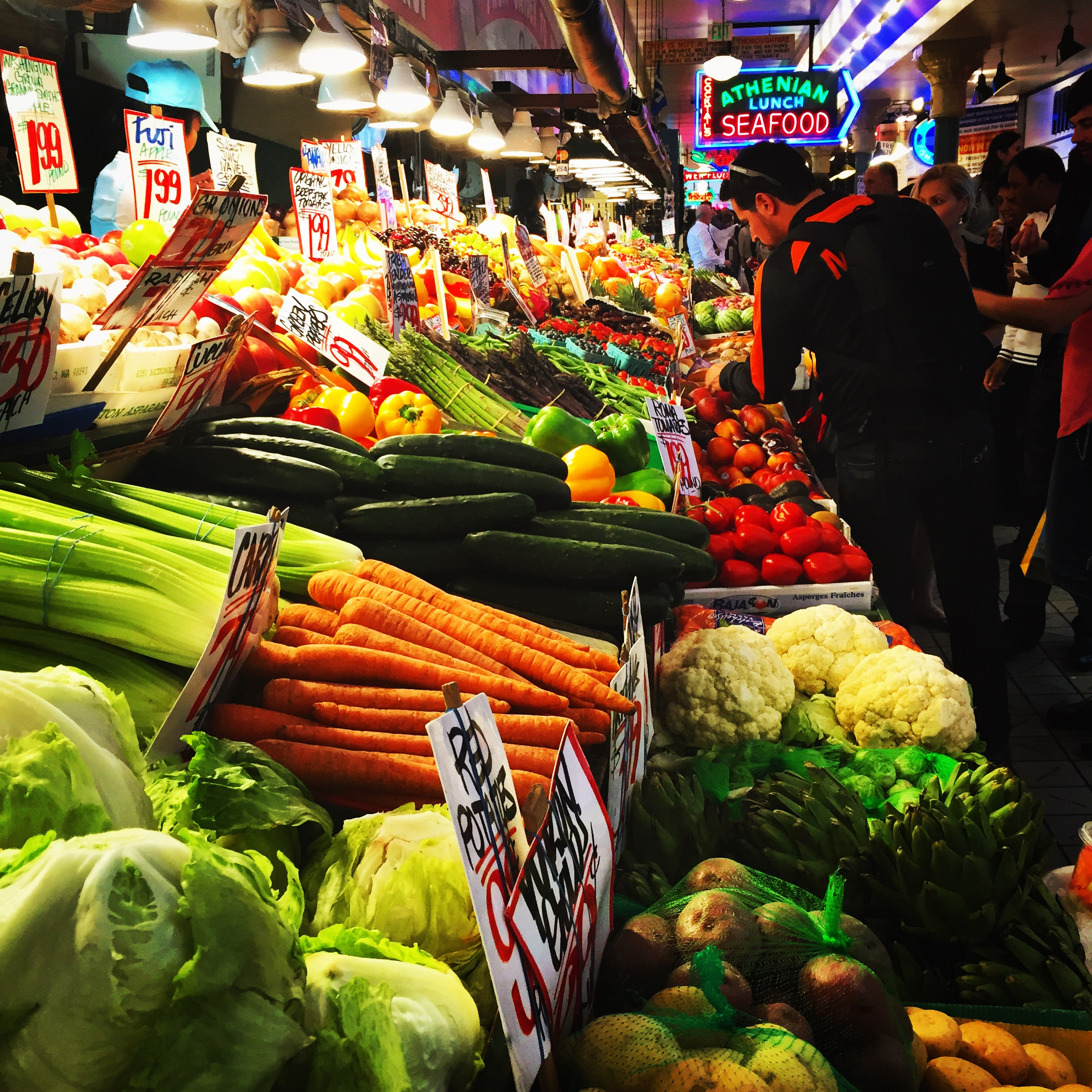
Fresh vegetables at the market

The Pike Place Market is overseen by the Pike Place Preservation & Development Authority (PDA), a public development authority established under Washington State law. It is overseen by a 12-member volunteer council. Its members serve four-year terms. Four members are appointed by mayor, four by the current council, and four by the Pike Place Market Constituency. The Market PDA sets the policies by which the Pike Place Market is managed and hires an executive director to carry out those policies.

Established in 1973, the PDA manages 80% of the properties in the city-recognized Market Historical District. Its founding law—the Market Charter—requires it to preserve, rehabilitate and protect the Market's buildings; increase opportunities for farm and food retailing in the Market; incubate and support small and marginal businesses; and provide services for low-income people. PDA revenues derive from the Market's tenants through rent, utilities, and other property management activities.

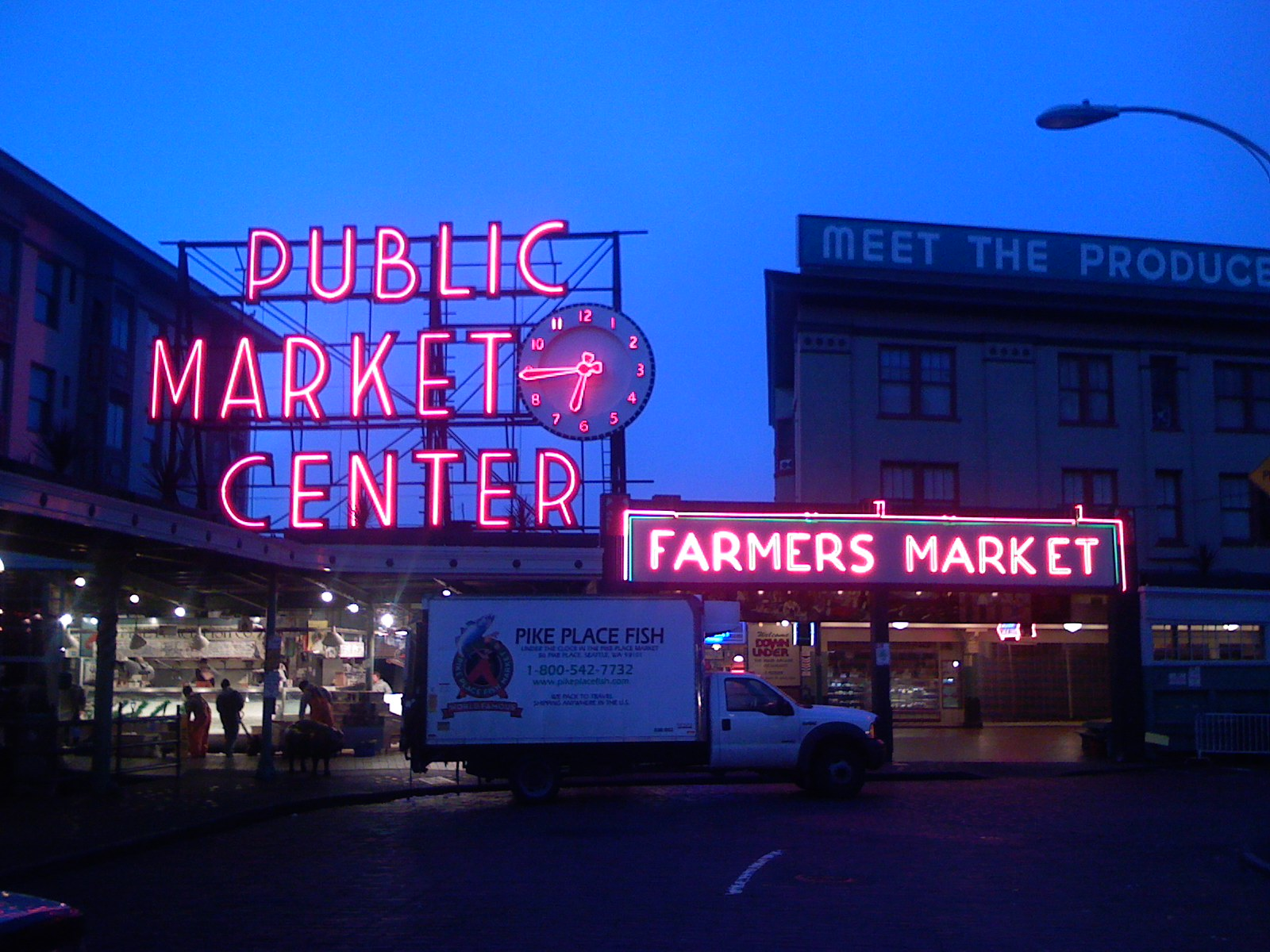
Pike Place Market at dawn, with the Pike Place Fish Market getting ready for the day's trade

The same 1973 charter that established the PDA also established the Pike Place Market Constituency. The Constituency elects one member to the PDA Council each year. Anyone 16 years of age or older who lives in Washington State can become a member of the Constituency by paying $1 yearly dues.

Operating independently of the PDA, the Market Historical Commission (established by the 1971 initiative to preserve the Market) has the specific mandate to preserve the Market's physical and social character as "the soul of Seattle." The commission must approve any substantive change in the use or design of buildings and signage in the Historical District, even when these actions are taken by the PDA itself. Members of the 12-member commission are appointed to three-year terms by the mayor. At any time, the commission consists of two members each from the Friends of the Market, Inc., Allied Arts of Seattle, Inc., and the Seattle chapter of the American Institute of Architects; two owners of property within the district; two Market merchants, and two district residents. They meet 22 times a year. The Seattle Department of Neighborhoods provides them with a staff person, and the city's Department of Design, Construction and Land Use (DCLU) can enforce their decisions.

Another key organization in the affairs of the Market is the Pike Place Merchants Association. Officially incorporated in 1973, it traces its history back to the Farm Association established in the 1920s. The association connects market vendors to legal, accounting, bookkeeping, business insurance, and health insurance services and provides free online advertising for its members. It also represents its members and attempts to advance their interests and opinions. All PDA tenants are required to be members; daystall vendors also have the option to join. Since 1974, the association has published the monthly Pike Place Market News, which promotes the Market and its neighborhood. For over three decades, the association sponsored a Memorial Day fair at the market; financial difficulties caused cancellation of the fair in 2004.

A separate Daystall Tenants Association (DTA) formed in the late 1980s to represent the specific interests of daystall vendors. The DTA formed in response to proposed increases in daystall rental rates. Most members pay a $2 annual membership fee; the fee is optional. The DTA meets on the Desimone Bridge in the Market at least once each quarter. Similarly, the United Farmers Coalition (UFC) formed in 1998 to represent daystall farmers who sell produce, flower, and processed food; the UFC represents only these food vendors, as against craft vendors. The Pike Market Performers' Guild, founded 2001, represents Market street performers. Among its members are Artis the Spoonman and Jim Page.

Friends of the Market, which spun out of Allied Arts in 1964 and over the next seven years spearheaded the activist work that saved the Market is no longer a driving force in the Market. Still, as noted above, they have two seats on the Historical Commission. They also give tours of the Market.

The Market Foundation (established 1982) was founded to support the Market's services for low-income people. The foundation now also supports heritage programs, improvements and repairs to historic buildings, and programs that assist the Market's farmers.

=== Conflicts ===
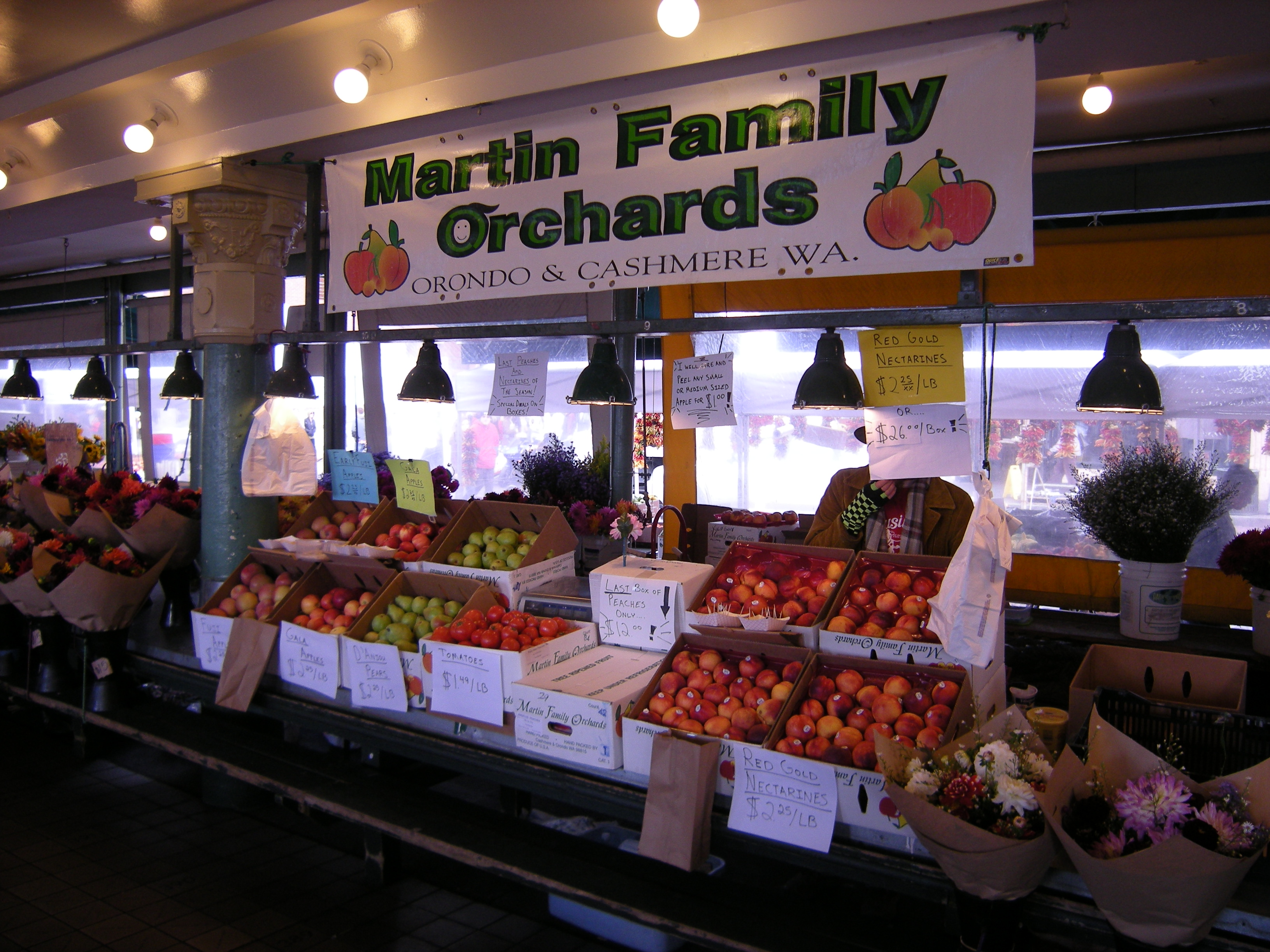
Farmer selling apples in a daystall

The PDA is a public trustee charged with many potentially conflicting goals. Its charter mandates it to "ensure that the traditional character of the Public Market is preserved." It is specifically mandated to

...afford... a continuing opportunity for Public Market farmers, merchants, residents, shoppers, and visitors to carry on their tradition and market activities... upgrad[e] structures and public amenities... initiate programs to expand food retailing in the Market Historical District, especially the sale of local farm produce; to preserve and expand the residential community, especially for low-income people; to promote the survival and predominance of small shops, marginal businesses, thrift shops, arts and crafts, and other enterprises, activities, and services which are essential to the functioning of the Public Market.

The City Auditor's office has stated that there is an "inherent conflict... between the PDA's need to operate the Market as a successful business entity and its Charter obligation to support small owner-operated tenant businesses."

As early as 1974, a Seattle Department of Community Development study noted space conflicts between farmers and craft vendors. Conflicts can be exacerbated because the stakeholders with conflicting needs are not talking to one another. Quoting the same City Auditor's report:

Most Market tenants do not routinely communicate with tenants in other areas of the Market. As a result, they sometimes criticize the PDA for not implementing suggestions they believe would work for them and their close neighbors—e.g., closing all or part of Pike Place to auto traffic—not realizing that their "solutions" would create problems for tenants in other parts of the Market. Then they conclude that the PDA is not taking their comments and suggestions seriously.

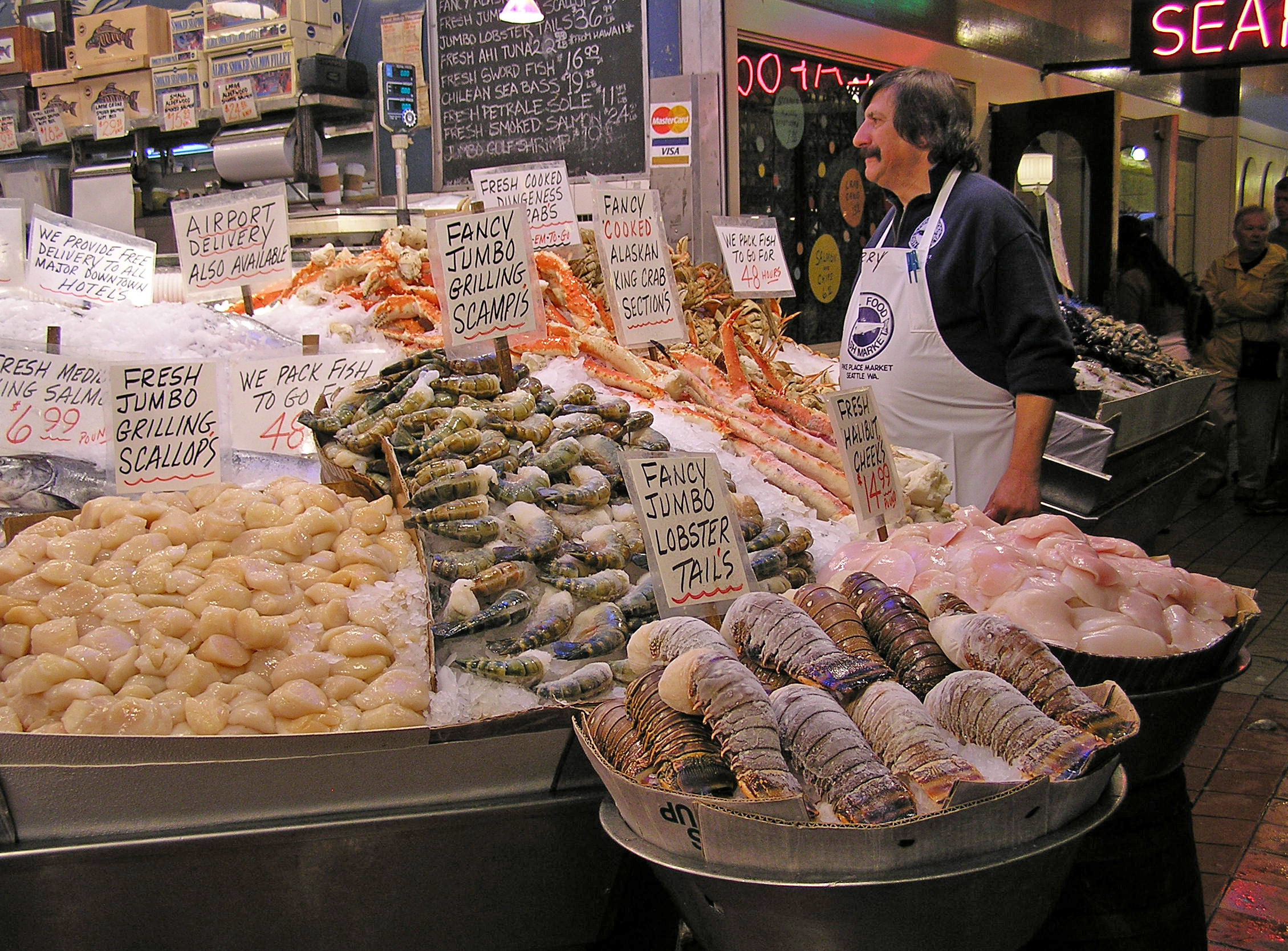
A fishmonger's stall in the Main Arcade. Open-fronted, but rented on a lease, not as a daystall.

Language barriers also play a role. For example, most of the flower vendors in the Market are Hmong; during the difficult negotiations in 1999 over replacing the Hildt Agreement, many were apparently under a misimpression that the proposed agreement would have halved the vending space they received for a day's rent; in fact, this was unchanged.

Further, the farmers who were the Market's original raison d'etre do not necessarily do well when the Market becomes more of a tourist attraction than venue for shopping for produce and groceries. "Craft vendors, antique and curio merchants, and booksellers…" wrote the City Auditor's office, "derive much of their business from tourists; fresh food vendors do not." Conversely, farmers have far more selling opportunities outside the Market than in the early and mid-20th century. As late as 1990, there were about ten farmers markets in Washington. By 1999 there were more than sixty. Most are seasonal weekend markets without most of the Pike Place Market's amenities, but they are not swarmed with tourists, parking is free or inexpensive and relatively plentiful, and food is the main focus of those markets, not crafts or flowers.

As a result, increasingly Pike Place Market daystalls are devoted to flowers and crafts rather than edible produce. "The Market," wrote the City Auditor's office,

...can be "lost" in either of two ways: It can stray from its traditional character or it can fail financially as a business entity. If the Market is to survive and thrive as a business entity in the face of increasing competition from other farmers' markets, modern full-service grocery stores, and retail shopping destinations in Seattle's Central Business District, the PDA must strike a balance between the Market's original old-world market character and modern business practices.

=== Policies ===
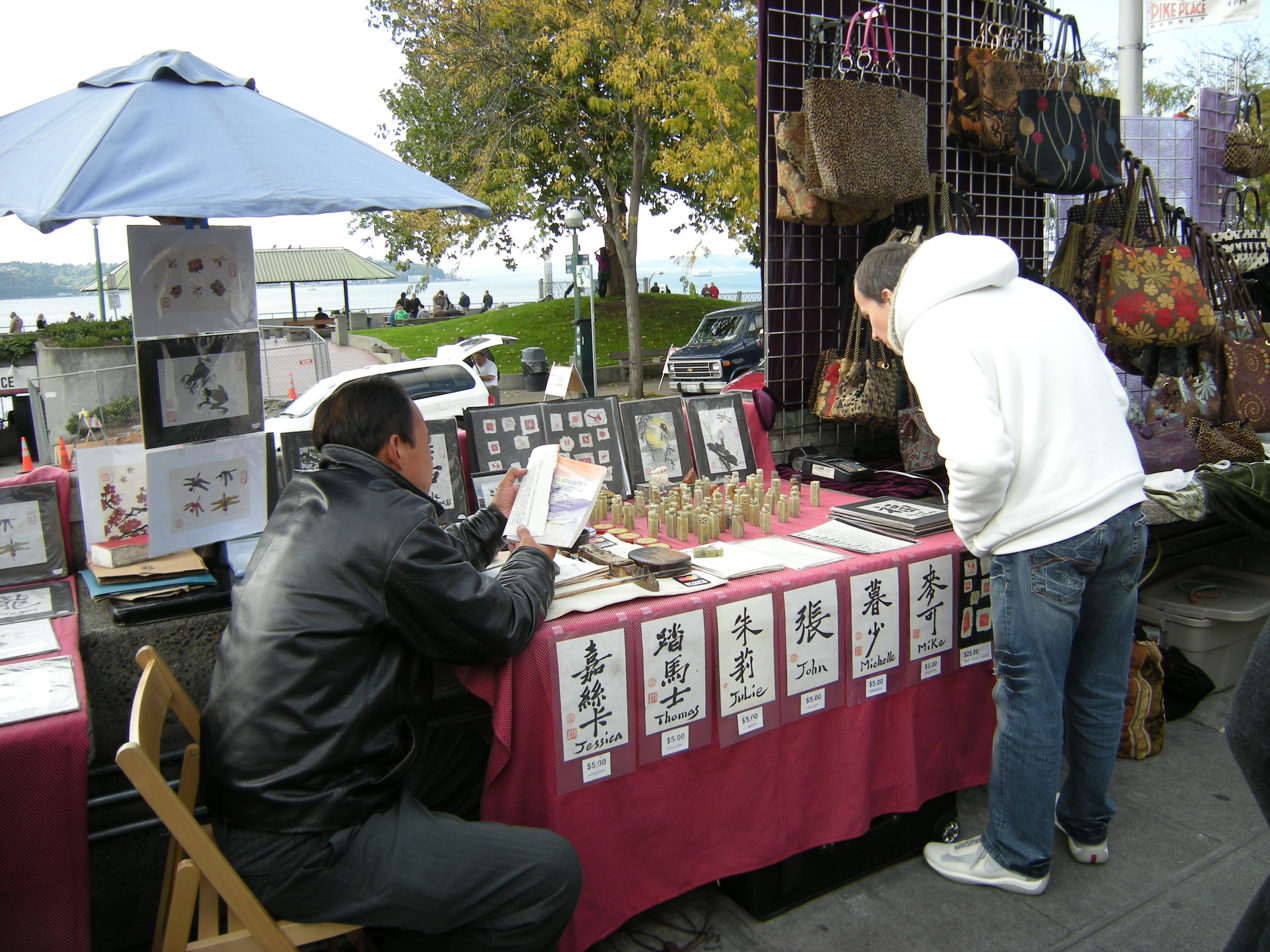
Chinese seal (chop) carver at an outdoor craft daystall on Pike Place just south of Virginia Street

The Market's "Meet the Producer" mandate now includes craftspeople as well as farmers. Both can rent daystalls. Farmers take historic precedence, but the PDA "acknowledges the rightful and permanent position of handmade arts and crafts as an integral use of the Market's Daystalls" and their rules seek to encourage a lively mix. Some grandfathered vendors are allowed to sell merchandise not of their own making on essentially the same terms as craftspeople. Currently, there are rules to make sure that new crafts vendors demonstrate themselves to be skilled craftspeople making their own wares with minimal use of assistants.

A standard Farm Table consists of two adjacent daystalls; a standard Craft Table is a single daystall. Daystalls are between 4 feet (1.2 m) and 5.5 feet (1.7 m) wide. Craftspeople have priority on the Desimone Bridge, the west side of the Market arcade north of the Desimone Bridge and the outdoor slabs between the arcade and Virginia Street; farmers have priority everywhere else. If farmers do not fill their priority tables, craftspeople may rent those, and vice versa. Priority is further set by separate seniority lists, one for farmers and one for craftspeople. For farmers, other factors besides seniority come into play, mainly how often the person sells at the Market. Farmers can pass permits through their family. The rules for joint and family crafts businesses are far more complex.

While farmers and craftspeople may make some use of agents to sell on their behalf (including vendors functioning on different days as one another's agents), to maintain their seniority farmers must be physically present one day a week and craftspeople two days a week. To sell on a Saturday, vendors must sell at the Market a minimum of two weekdays of the preceding week. There are also allowances for taking vacations and sabbaticals without losing one's seniority. Senior Crafts Permit Holders—craftspeople who have sold in the Market for 30 years or more—need only rent (and use) a daystall once a week to maintain their seniority.

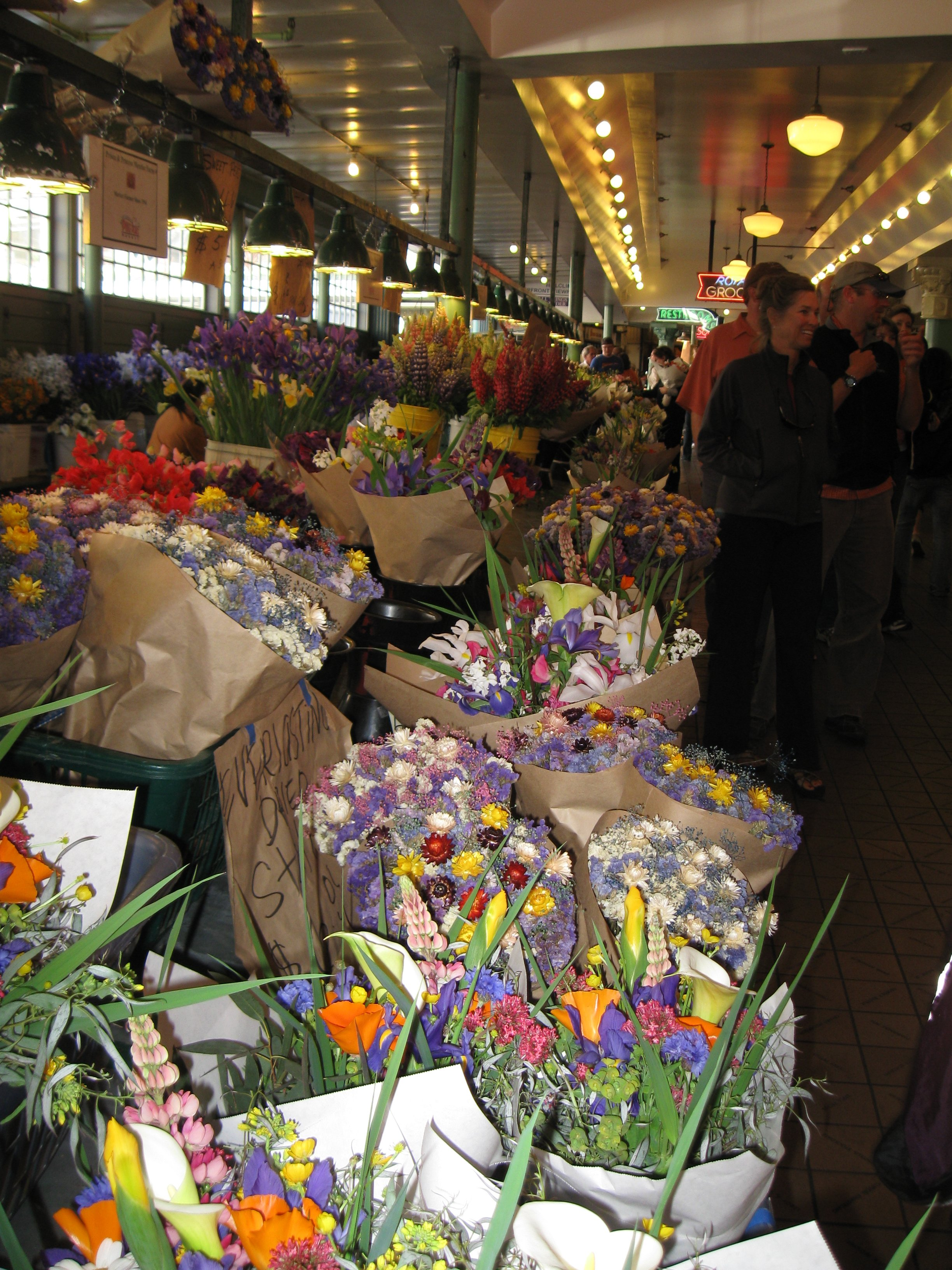
Flowers for sale in Main Arcade daystalls

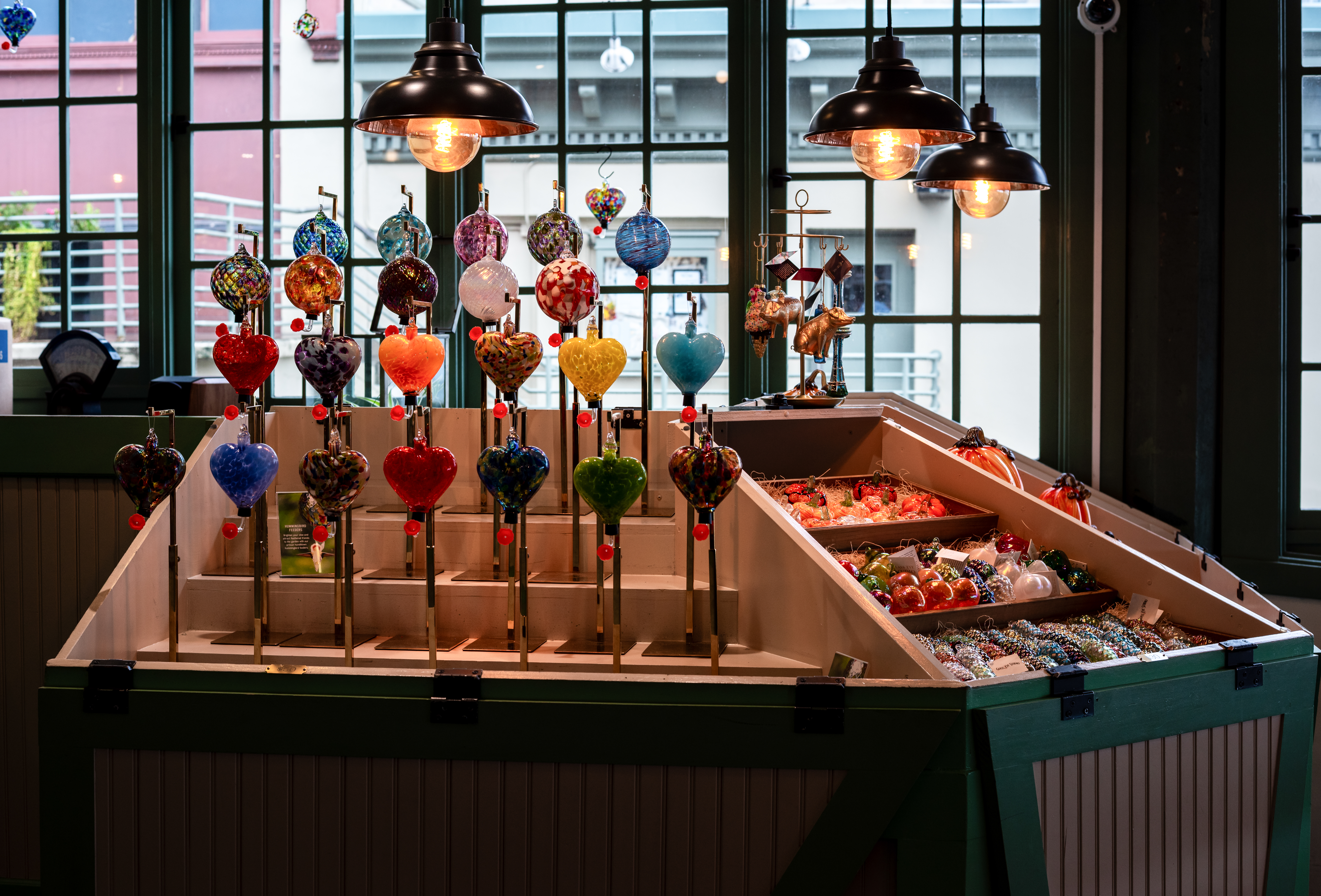
Blown glass for sale in a main level daystall

The definition of permitted farm products includes (among other items) produce, flowers, eggs, cultivated mushrooms, meat, cultured shellfish, and dairy products. There is also a broader category of supplemental farm products such as wild-harvested berries and mushrooms, non-edible bee products, or holiday wreaths. These may be sold in conjunction with permitted farm products, but there are strict limitations to prevent these from becoming anyone's primary products. Rules vary significantly at different times of year.

Farmers, craftspeople, and performers all must pay for an annual permit. As of 2008, the fee is $35 for farmers and craftspeople, $30 for performers. Craftspeople who vend off season—January through March—pay an additional $35 for a separate permit. For performers, this annual fee is their only fee. Farmers and craftspeople pay day rent for any daystalls they use. Depending on the season and the day of the week, a daystall may rent for anywhere from $5.85 for a stall on a Monday-Thursday off season to $32.85 on a Sunday in peak season. There are also separate rents for lockers and coolers.

Compared to farmers and craftspeople, performers have a lesser role in the Market, but still one formally recognized by the PDA. "The PDA's mission with regard to performers is to maintain locations within the Market where performing artists may entertain Market shoppers in a fashion consistent with and complimentary [sic] to the needs of the Market's commercial business activities and Market residents. Performers may receive donations and may display their recordings for sale, but prohibited from active solicitation of donations and from active sale of "any product associated with the performance".

In keeping with their lack of day fees, individual performers are not assigned specific places and times to perform. There are only positions in a (virtual) line for each marked, sanctioned performance location. Queuing runs on an honor system. Each performance is limited to one hour if any other licensed performer is waiting for the spot. Electronic amplification is not allowed, nor are brass instruments or drums. Certain performance locations are further limited to "quiet" performances where (for example) even hand-clap percussion is not allowed.

Although they do not have the same strict requirements as for daystalls, most commercial Market merchants are owner-operated businesses. In the 1970s, when the Market was undergoing extensive rehabilitation and the future of the Market was somewhat unstable, the PDA consolidated its merchant base by giving merchant tenants very favorable leases, with longer terms and lower rates than were available elsewhere in Downtown Seattle. This policy was part of the reason that the PDA ran into the financial difficulties that led to its dealings with the Urban Group. The PDA now gives below-market rates only to start-up businesses, businesses or organizations designed to serve low and moderate income persons, and to "the Market's unique character-defining businesses." The latter include produce, fish, and meat businesses. The PDA often will not renew multi-year leases for businesses with poor sales performance or other problems, but typically will allow them to remain indefinitely on a month-to-month basis. About once a year, the PDA has occasion to refuse to renew when a merchant's lease ends.

=== Housing and social services ===
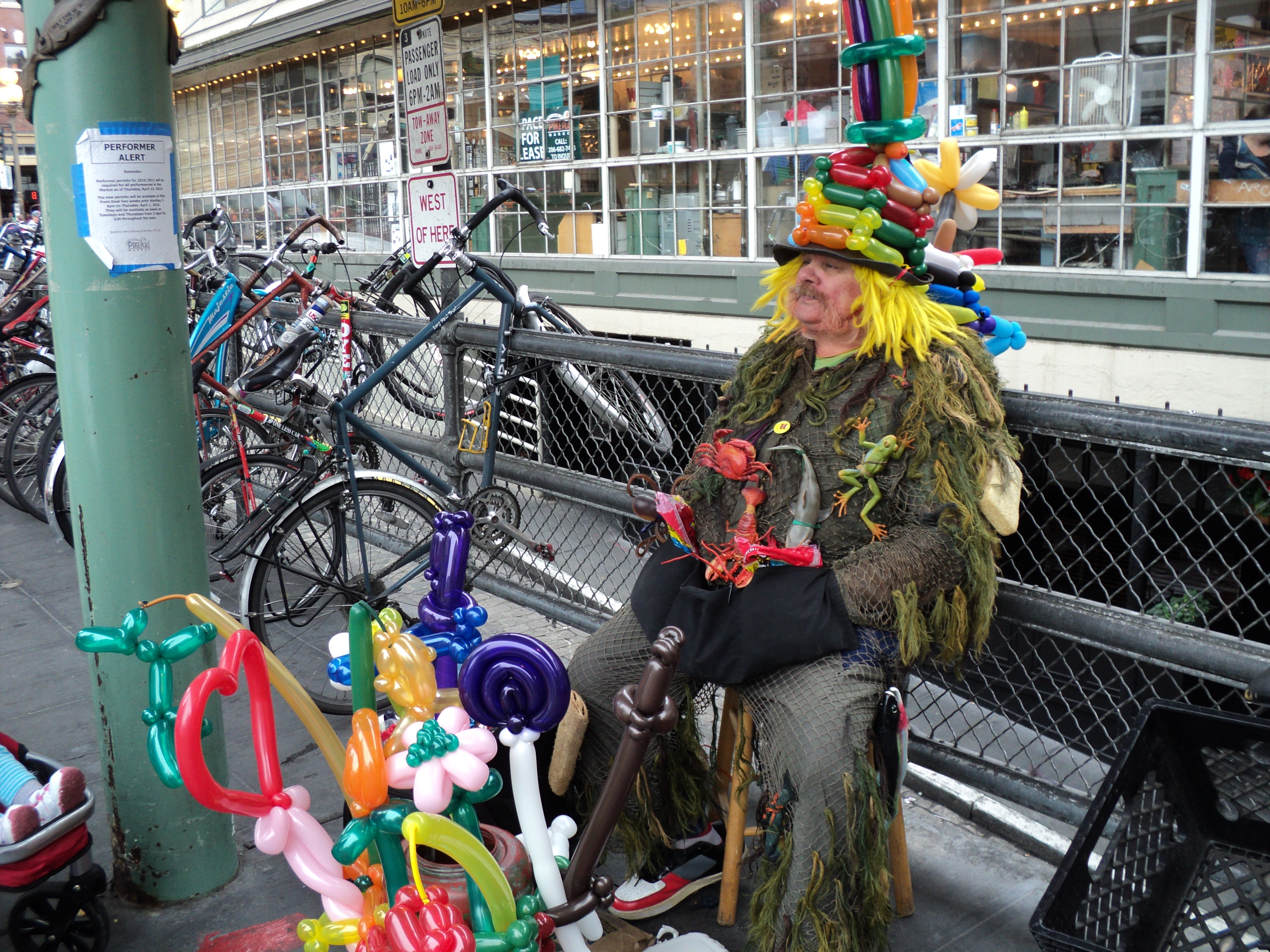
Thomas the Balloon Man, longtime vendor

The Market is also a significant provider of low-income housing and social services. The Market Foundation supports the Pike Market Medical Clinic, Pike Market Senior Center, Downtown Food Bank, and Pike Market Childcare and Preschool (all within the Market), as well as low-income housing in and near the Market. They provide Market Fresh coupons to their low-income tenants, redeemable for Market produce, and implement the FoodLink program that distributes unsold Market produce to other Seattle food banks and meal programs. The money placed in the Market's giant piggybank goes to this foundation, as do the funds raised by several annual or intermittent fundraisers, including Pigs on Parade.

About 500 people live in the market. Approximately 90% are low-income seniors with subsidized rents. Their average income is only $11,095 a year. Among the low-income units in the Market are 41 in the LaSalle Hotel, 51 in Market House, 44 in the Stewart House and 96 in the Livingston-Baker.

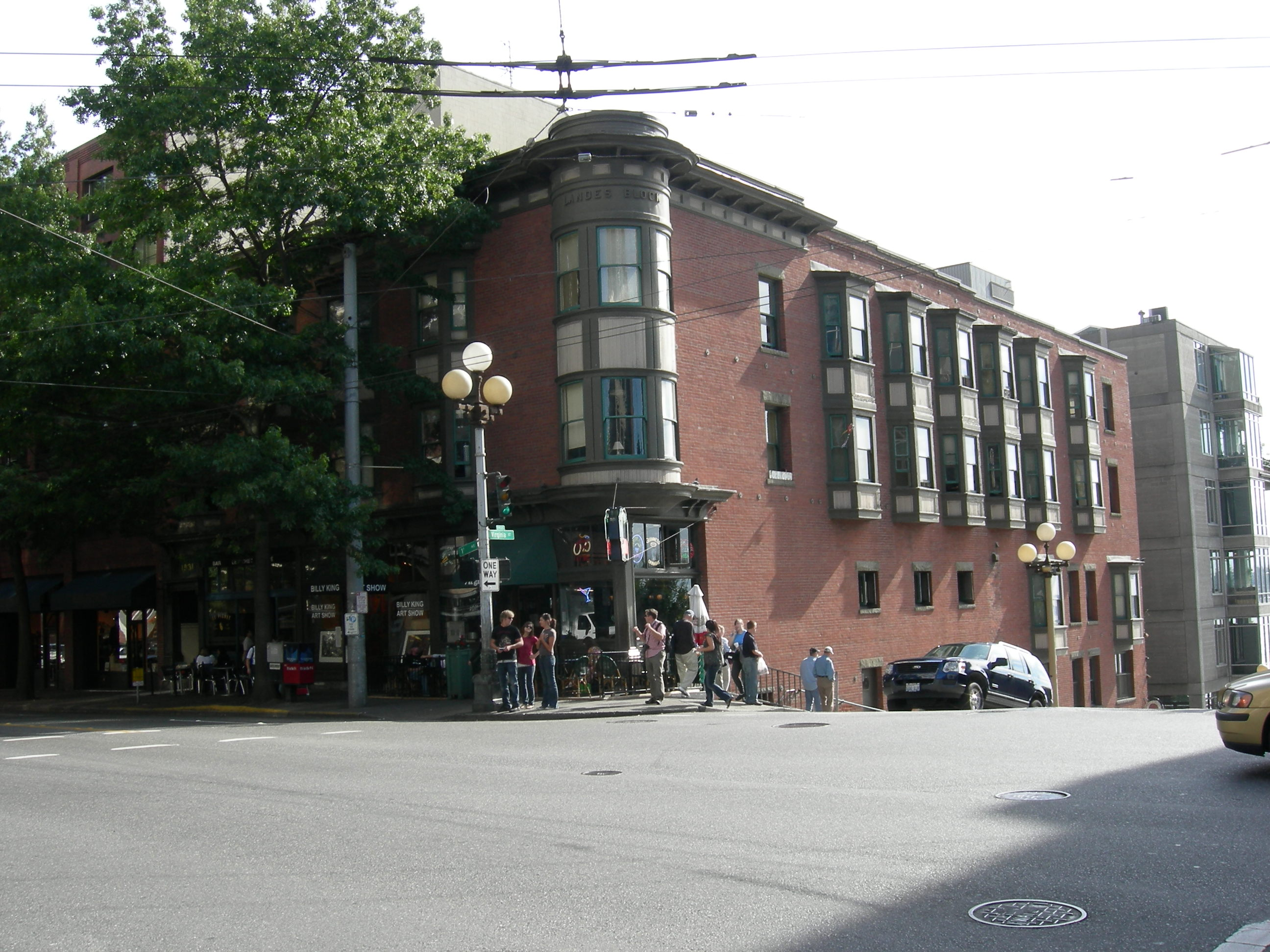
Landes Block, also known as the Hotel Livingston or the Livingston-Baker Apartments. The Pike Market Medical Clinic is in the lower portion of this building, facing onto Post Alley. Part of the Pike and Virginia Building can be seen at right.

The Pike Market Medical Clinic provides primary care and ancillary services to 3,600 patients. Most of these are either elderly, HIV-positive, or working poor. One third homeless, 30% are physically disabled, and 60% have severe mental illness and/or chemical addiction. The clinic provides basic medical care, subsidized prescriptions, lab work, mental health counseling, drug and alcohol counseling, connections to other community services, and sometimes even assistance in finding housing.

Approximately 900 people use the Market's senior center. Services include hot lunches for low-income seniors, help in finding housing and jobs, and a variety of classes ranging from physical fitness and health to language, geography, art, and computer training.

The Downtown Food Bank, located in the Public Market Parking Garage on Western Avenue provides groceries to approximately 1,000 people a week. About 265 bags of groceries are delivered weekly to homebound downtown residents. About 160 families receive infant milk, baby food and diapers.

The child care and preschool serves 90–100 families with children ages 2–5 each year. 84% of families with children attending are low-income and receive tuition assistance. Besides its educational aspects, the school provides these children with breakfast, lunch, and afternoon snacks and has a full-time, onsite child and family support professional to identify resources children their families might need and to link them to those resources.

== Attractions ==
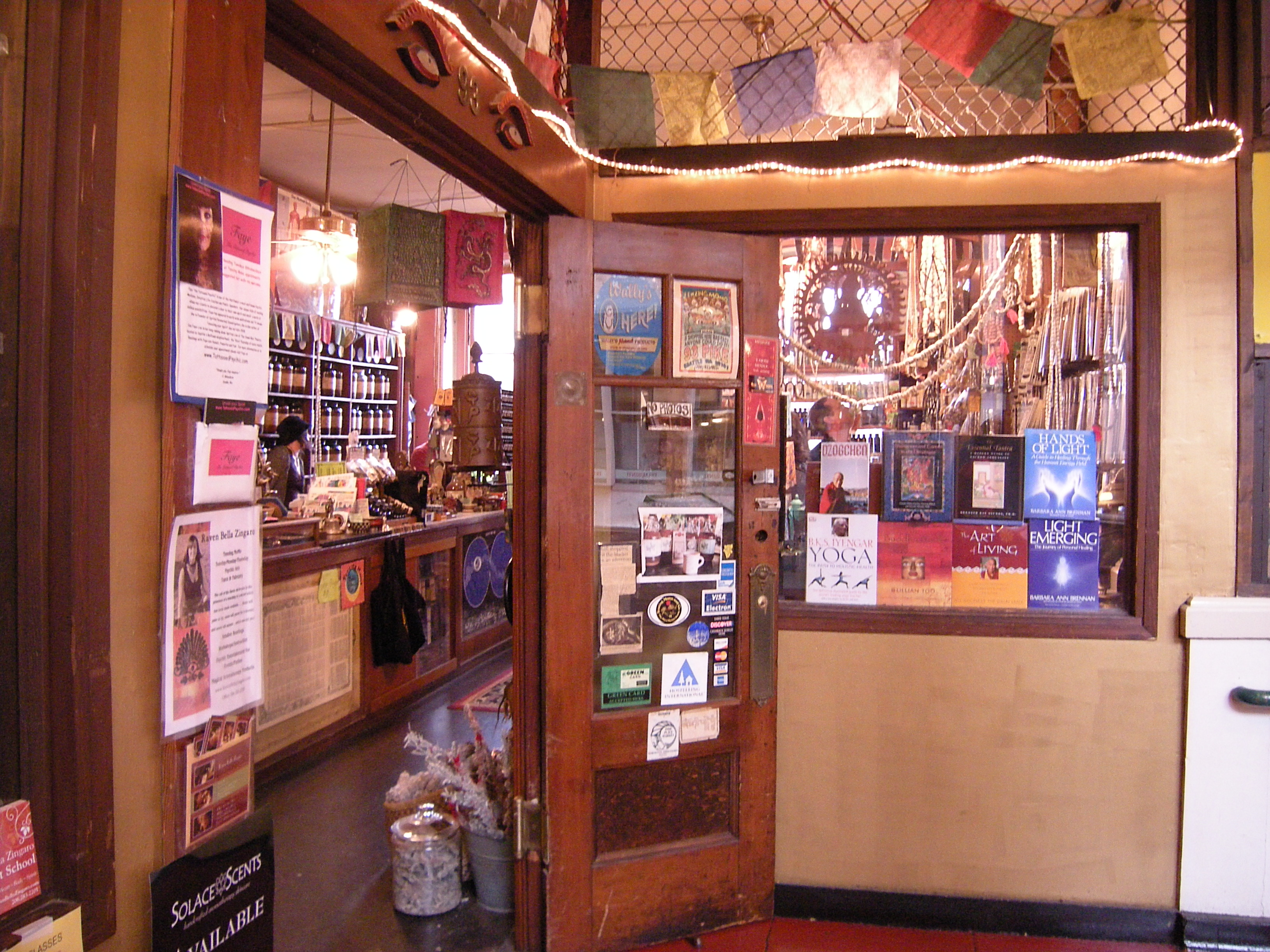
Herbal apothecary Tenzing Momo

One of the Market's major attractions is Pike Place Fish Market, where employees throw three-foot salmon and other fish to each other rather than passing them by hand. When a customer orders a fish, an employee at the Fish Market's ice-covered fish table picks up the fish and hurls it over the countertop, where another employee catches it and preps it for sale.

The first Starbucks store, founded in 1971, was originally located at 2000 Western Avenue. In 1977 it moved one block away to 1912 Pike Place where it has been in continuous operation ever since. The store was opened by three partners: Jerry Baldwin, Zev Siegl and Gordon Bowker. They were inspired by Alfred Peet of Peet's Coffee to open the store and sell high-quality coffee beans and coffee making equipment and accessories. The sign outside this branch, unlike others, features the original logo – a bare-breasted siren that was modeled after a 15th-century Norse woodcut. It also features a pig statue called "Pork'n Beans," purchased in the 2001 Pigs on Parade fundraiser. Starbucks now owns the Seattle's Best Coffee (SBC) brand, which traces its history back to Stewart Brothers' Coffee, which arrived in the Market several months before Starbucks was founded. On March 8, 2011, the store was the site of a NASDAQ opening bell ringing as Starbucks kicked off its 40th anniversary.

After more than 30 years in the Market, the herbal apothecary Tenzing Momo has become an institution both for obtaining herbs and advice on their use. Founded in 1977, the name (which is Tibetan) means "divine dumpling". Nearby, Market Spice (founded 1911) sells slightly less exotic herbal substances.

The Market Heritage Center at 1531 Western Avenue is a small museum about the history of the Market.

Pike Place Market is Seattle's most popular tourist destination and among the most visited tourist attractions in the world. In 2023, the market had 20.9 million total visitors and $177 million in commercial sales. The name "Pike's Place" is commonly used by non-Seattleites despite being grammatically incorrect, as the market is not named for a particular person.

=== Rachel and Pigs on Parade ===
The Pike Place Market's unofficial bronze mascot, Rachel

Pike Place Market's unofficial mascot, Rachel, a bronze cast piggy bank that weighs 550 pounds (250 kg), has been located since 1986 at the corner of Pike Place under the "Public Market Center" sign. Rachel was designed by local artist Georgia Gerber and modeled after a pig (also named Rachel) that lived on Whidbey Island and was the 1977 Island County prize-winner. Rachel receives roughly US$6,000–$9,000 annually in just about every type of world currency, which is collected by the Market Foundation to fund the Market's social services.

Rachel provided the theme for the Pigs on Parade fundraiser that was first held in 2001 and was one of several events in various cities modeled on a similar 1998 event in Zurich; the Zurich event centered on cows and was the first of what have come to be known as CowParades. A similar Pigs On Parade fundraiser was held in 2007 on the occasion of the Market centennial, which happened to coincide with the Chinese zodiac Year of the Pig.

=== Buskers ===
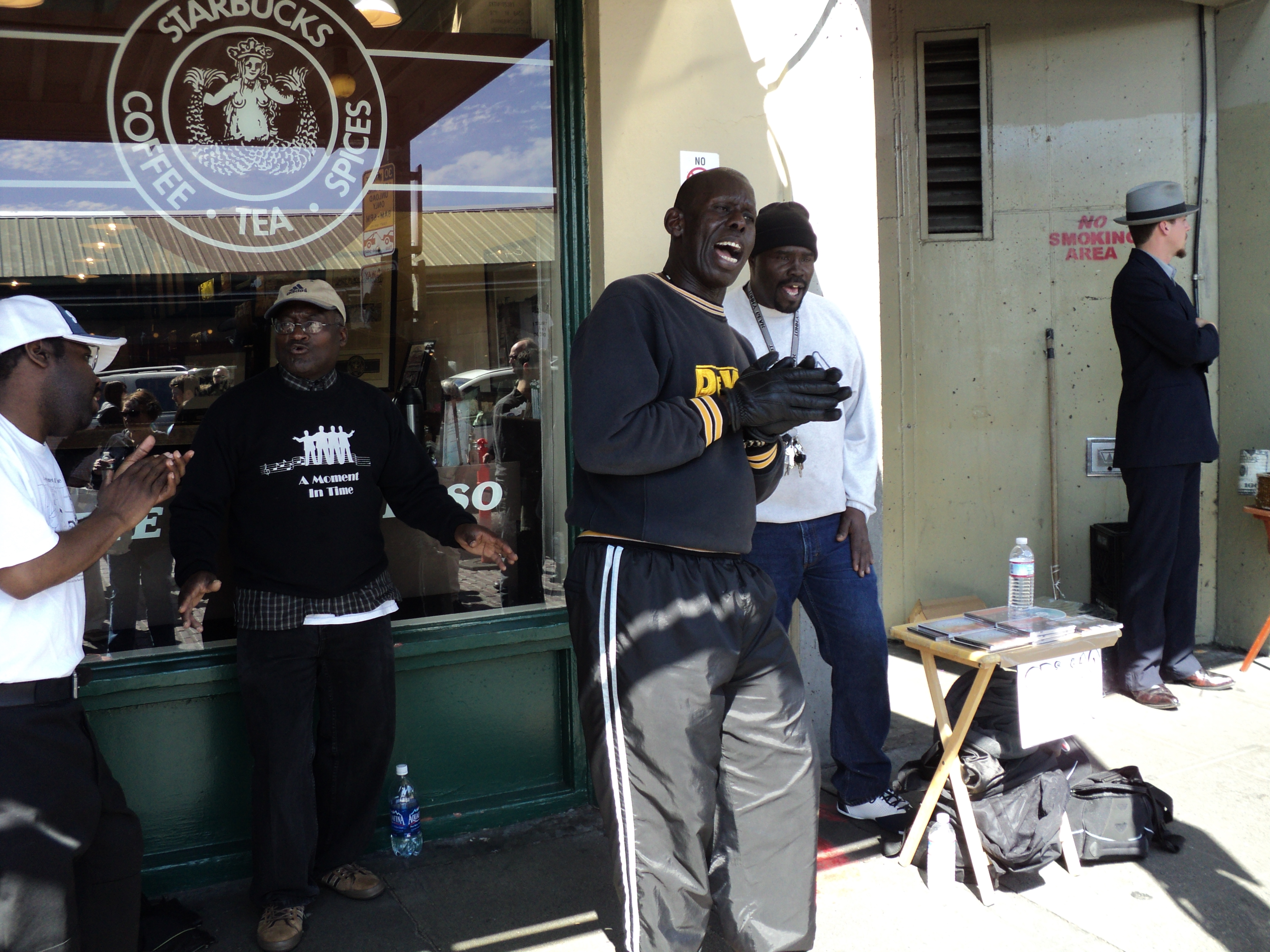
A cappella gospel group at Pike Place Market

Since at least the 1960s, Pike Place Market has been known for street entertainers. Besides the aforementioned spoons player Artis the Spoonman and songwriter Jim Page, Market performers in years past or present have included steel guitarist Baby Gramps; Johnny Hahn, who routinely hauls around a 64-key spinet piano; retro-jazzer Howlin' Hobbit, who plays ukulele; klezmer influenced musicians the Bus Tunnel Bandits; hoop busker musician Emery Carl, chairman of the Market's Performer's Guild; blind autoharpist and singer Jeanne Towne; Kirsten "Mother Zosima" Anderberg, who for many years sang feminist and other political songs while dressed in a nun's habit; a cappella gospel singers Brother Willie and the Market Crew; the old-timey Tallboys; Johnny Cash sound-alike Vince Mira; jazz-tinged players Amber Tide (Thaddeus Spae and his late wife Sandahbeth); alternative-jazz-pop singer-songwriter Alyse Black, low-volume crooner Paul Jayson Pottinger, and the late folksinger Jim Hinde, a Vietnam War veteran.

Jump blues musician PK Dwyer is credited with forming the first-ever street band to busk at the Market. He formed that band, Felix & the Freelicks, shortly after he arrived in the Pacific Northwest in 1971. The band evolved into various other alignments, including (successively) the Dynamic Logs, the Jitters, Throbbing Gems, the Royal Famille du Caniveaux / Gutter People of Paris, all of whom played at the Market. Some of these alignments also included Ron Bailey; the Dynamic Logs included Orville Johnson as well. The band, Morrison Boomer, is a more recent staple and known to record live music at the market.

=== Dining and drinking ===
The Pike Place Market offers numerous other eating and drinking options. The once endemic workingmen's and sailors' taverns are gone; at roughly opposite corners of the Market, the Virginia Inn (founded as Virginia Bar, approximately 1908; operated as a cardroom during Prohibition, then Virginia Inn; passed into current management 1980 and slowly gentrified) and Place Pigalle (originally Lotus Inn, name dates from 1950s, remodeled 1982) retain their names, but both have gone upmarket. The Athenian Inn in the Main Market traces its history back to a 1909 bakery and is a relatively ungentrified bar and restaurant. Three Girls Bakery dates back to 1912 and may have been the first Seattle business started by women. While it is not in its original Corner Market location, no longer bakes on premises, and its current owner Jack Levy is a man, it still sells a vast variety of baked goods, does a brisk business in takeaway sandwiches, and has an old-style lunch counter.

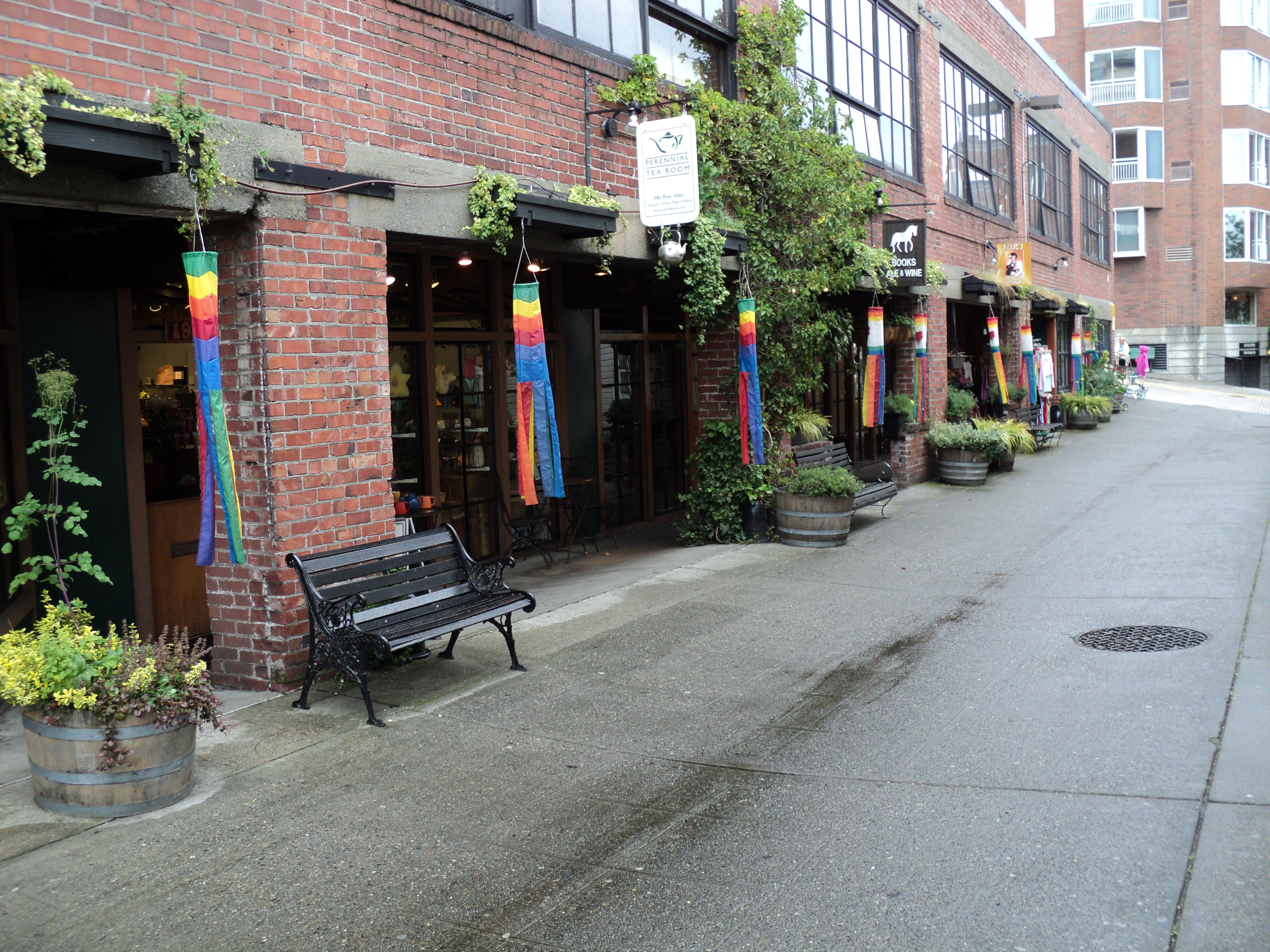
View along Post Alley in the Market

The Pink Door (founded 1981), entered by a nearly unmarked door on upper Post Alley, is a favorite first-date restaurant, with solid Italian food, a fantasia of a dining room, a bar that sometimes features live jazz, and an outdoor deck overlooking Elliott Bay. Another restaurant combining Italian food and romantic ambience is the Il Bistro, located below grade in the Economy Market, off the winding cobblestones of Lower Post Alley. When it was founded in 1977 it was played an important role in the rise of fine dining in Seattle.

Other longstanding Market restaurants and bars include Lowell's (founded 1957), an old Main Market standby self-described as "almost classy"; French bistro Maximilien, founded in 1975 by François Kissel, owned since 1997 by host Axel Macé and chef Eric Francy, and highly praised by Julia Child; and the Copacabana (founded 1964), Seattle's only Bolivian restaurant, upstairs in the Triangle Building with a balcony overlooking Pike Place.

== People ==
Frank Goodwin and his brothers developed most of the core Market buildings. He was largely responsible for the decision to keep ornamentation to a minimum to keep the emphasis on the products rather than the institution and not to scare off people looking for good prices on their produce. Upon his retirement in 1925, his nephew Arthur Goodwin took over most of the Market ownership, selling some shares to people outside of the family.

Giuseppe Desimone was born about 40 miles (64 km) east of Naples, Italy. He arrived in America from Italy as a stowaway, but soon became a successful farmer with land in South Park, Tukwila and the Kent Valley along the Green River. A longtime Market vendor, Desimone was one of those who bought shares in the Market in 1925 and eventually became its owner by slowly buying out Arthur Goodwin. He was president of the Market until his death in 1946. Outside of the Market, he is credited with keeping Boeing in the Seattle area in 1936 by selling them a large tract of land for a nominal fee.

His son Richard Desimone succeeded him as president of the market and served in that position until 1974. He kept the Market alive in dark times for farmers' markets, doing nearly all business on handshake deals rather than through formal leases. He later served on the Market Historical Commission.

Victor Steinbrueck was the leading architect-activist in defining the Pike Market neighborhood, and artist Mark Tobey in visualizing and recording, in developing his "Northwest Mystic" style of the internationally recognized Northwest School of art. Internationally recognized in the 1940s, Tobey explored the neighborhood with his art in the 1950s and early 1960s, as the area was being increasingly characterized by the Seattle Establishment as overdue for urban renewal, particularly replacement with a parking garage, high-rise housing and modern, upscale retail. People of city neighborhoods and citizen preservation activists struggled through the 1960s, culminating in 1971 with 2 to 1 passage of a citizen initiative for protection and citizen oversight of the core Pike Place Market that has since largely protected the neighborhood.

For many years, Sol "The Cod Father" Amon of Pure Food Fish has been the longest-tenured vendor at Pike Place Market. His father, Jack Amon, began selling fish in the Market in 1911 as a partner in the Philadelphia Fish Market. From about 1920 to 1935, he owned and operated the American Fish Company. In 1951 he bought the Pure Food Fish Company (founded 1917–1918), which Sol Amon largely took over in 1956. Sol had worked in the Market since 1947 and has been sole proprietor of Pure Food Fish since his father's death in 1966. He can often be seen outside his stall chatting with visitors and helping them choose their fish, including a brisk tourist trade in salmon packed to travel. The Seattle City Council honored him in 2006 on the 50th anniversary of his taking over the business: they named him "King of the Market" and permanently designated April 11 as Sol Amon Day. Amon is a longtime major supporter of the Market Foundation. On the first Sol Amon Day in 2006, Amon donated all of the day's profits from Pure Food Fish to the foundation.

Walter DeMarsh of Mobeta Shoes has made custom shoes for people with foot disfigurements and deformities since 1979.

== Buildings ==
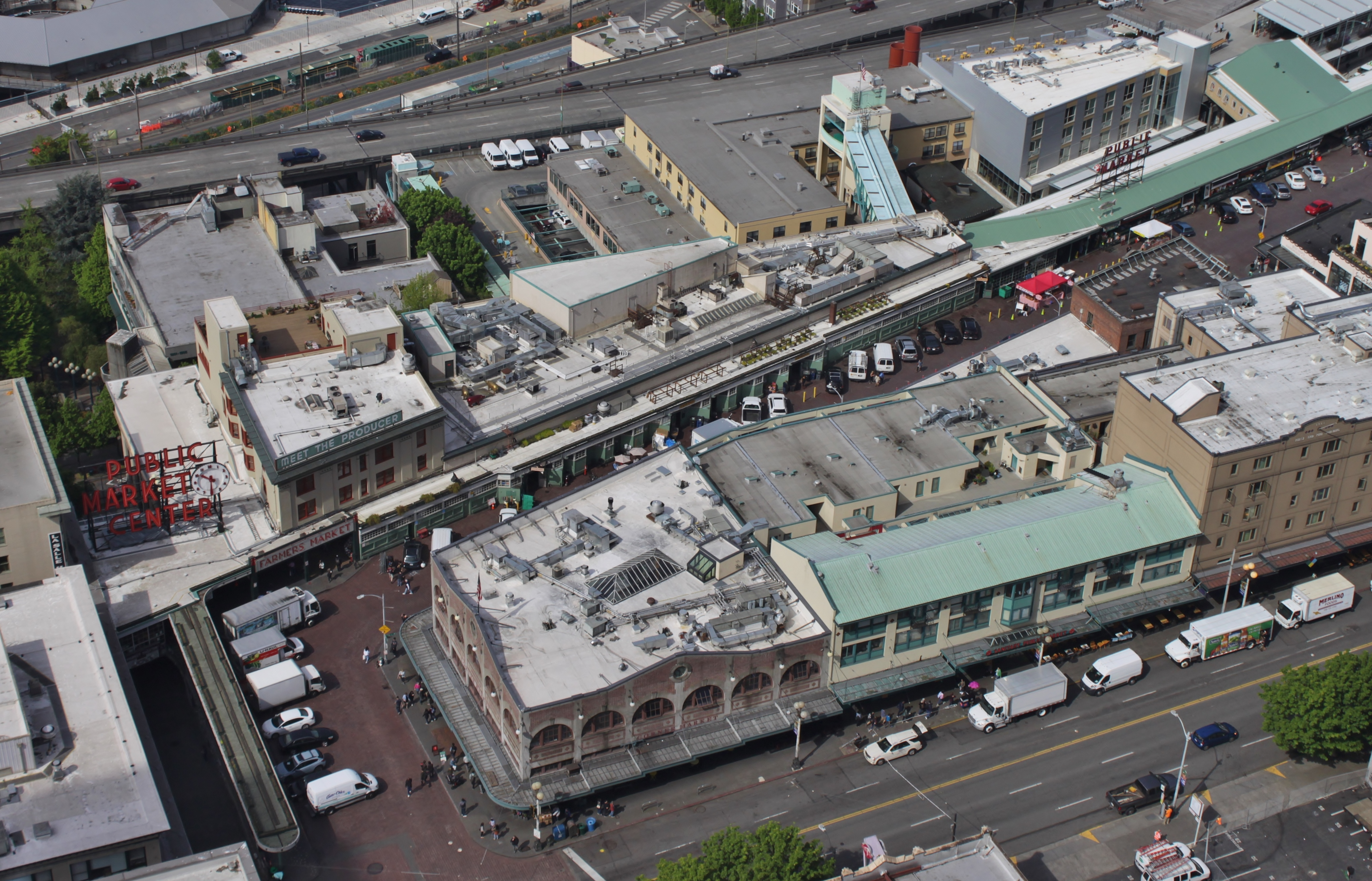
Aerial view of Pike Place Market from the east

Few of the historic buildings in the Pike-Market neighborhood (and none of the Market buildings as such) are individually designated as landmarks or registered as historic places. Buildings included in the federally and locally designated historic districts gain most of the benefits that would accrue from individual designation, so there is little reason to go through the difficult process of obtaining separate designation.

=== Market buildings ===
The Market began on a boardwalk adjacent to the 3-story Leland Hotel (1900, architect unknown). The Leland was incorporated in 1907 by engineer John Goodwin into the Main Arcade. In 1914–1915 he and architect Andrew Willatsen extended this complex further into the Fairley Building, which includes Lowell's, the Athenian, and the "Down Under". The complex was rehabilitated in 1977 by George Bartholick. As of 2008, the upper two stories of the Leland continue to be housing. Together, all of these constitute today's Main Market.

The two-story Triangle Building (Thompson & Thompson, 1908; rehabilitation by Fred Bassetti & Co., 1977) originally housed the South Park Poultry Company. The 1977 rehabilitation joined it with the adjacent 3-story Silver Oakum Building (unknown, 1910; Bassetti, 1977). The Outlook Hotel (now LaSalle Hotel; architect unknown; rehabilitation by Bartholick, 1977) also dates from 1908. A legitimate seaman's and workingman's hotel until 1942, its Japanese American operators Rosuke and T.K. Kodama were forcibly interned during World War II. Nellie Curtis took it over, changed the name, and ran it as a brothel into the 1950s. Since 1977 the building has been joined to the adjacent Cliff House (c. 1901), and largely devoted to low-income housing. Shops and the Market PDA office are on the ground floor. Its roof provides outdoor seating for the restaurant Maximilien.

The Sanitary Market (Daniel Huntington, 1910; reconstructed 1942, McClelland and Jones; rehabilitated and extended 1981, Bassetti Norton Metler) reputedly was so named for its innovation at the time, that no horses were allowed inside. A fire on December 15, 1941, severely damaged the building, which was reconstructed as a 2-story building with rooftop parking. Nearly four decades later the parking lot was eliminated, replaced by two floors of residences.

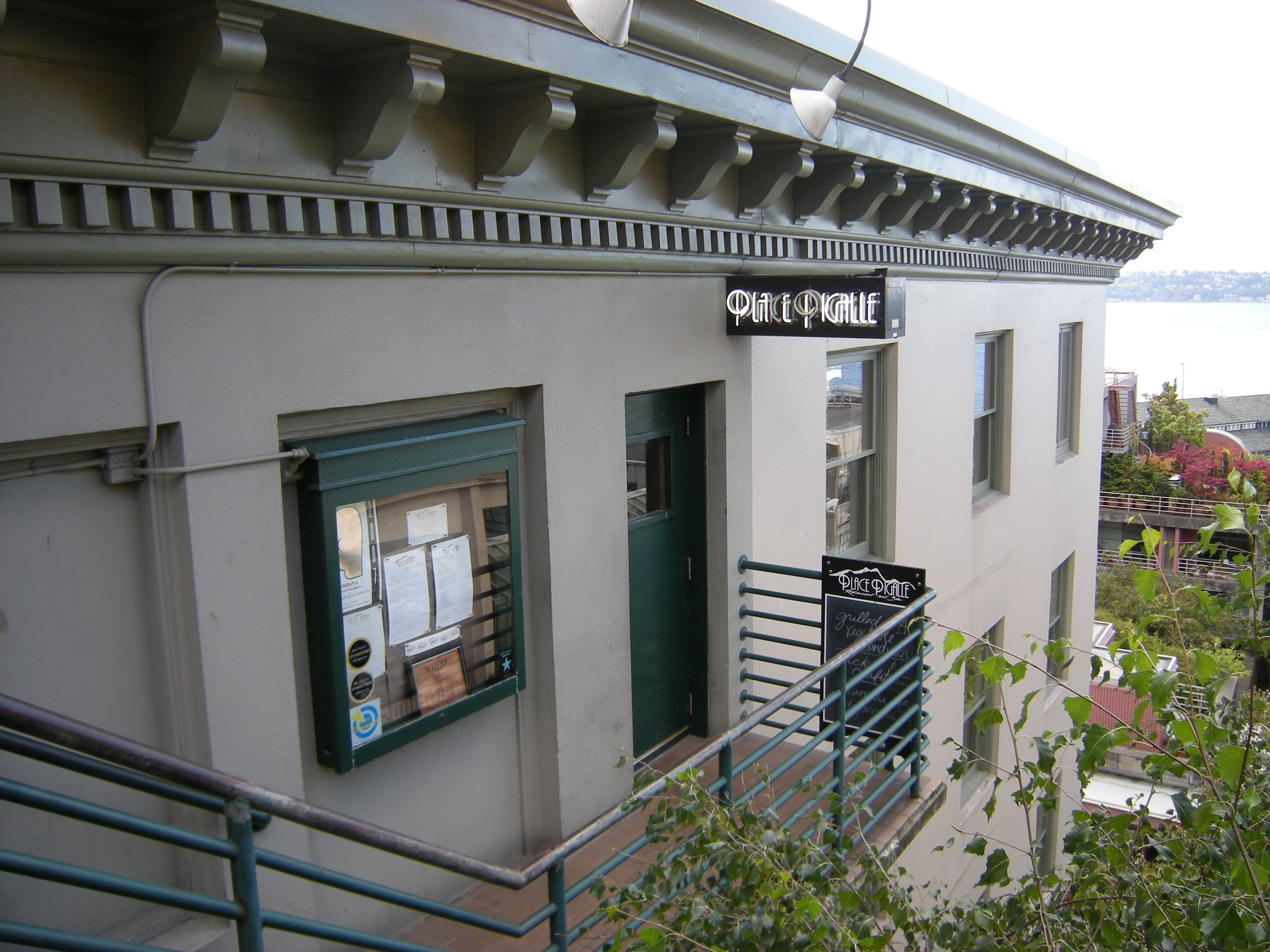
Place Pigalle sits atop the LaSalle Hotel.

The North Arcade (1911 and 1922, John Goodwin; rehabilitation by Bartholick, 1977) constituted a major northward extension of the Main Market, extending it 1,200 feet (370 m) to the northwest and adding 160 covered stalls.

The 3-story Corner Market building (Harlan Thomas & Clyde Grainger 1912; rehabilitation by Karlis Rekevics, 1975) sits on the right as one enters the Market along Pike Street. In its early years it included daystalls, and the businesses facing onto First Avenue were open-fronted. The Three Girls Bakery, the first known business in the Corner Market, is now located in the adjacent Sanitary Market. The basement was home to Patti Summers' jazz club for over two decades before becoming Can Can in 2006; the building is also home to anarchist bookstore Left Bank Books, as well as numerous other businesses.

Across Pike Street from the Corner Market is the Economy Market (unknown, 1900, as Bartell Building; remodeled by John Goodwin & Andrew Willatsen 1916; rehabilitation by Bartholick, 1978). The 1978 rehabilitation occurred in conjunction with the construction of the adjacent South Arcade at the corner of First Avenue and Union Street (Olsen / Walker, 1985). The South Arcade lies outside of the protected historic Market areas. It includes condominium apartments, but also the Pike Pub & Brewery and several other retail businesses of a similar character to those within the Market boundaries. Its owner, Harbor Properties, describes it as "adjacent to" the Market.

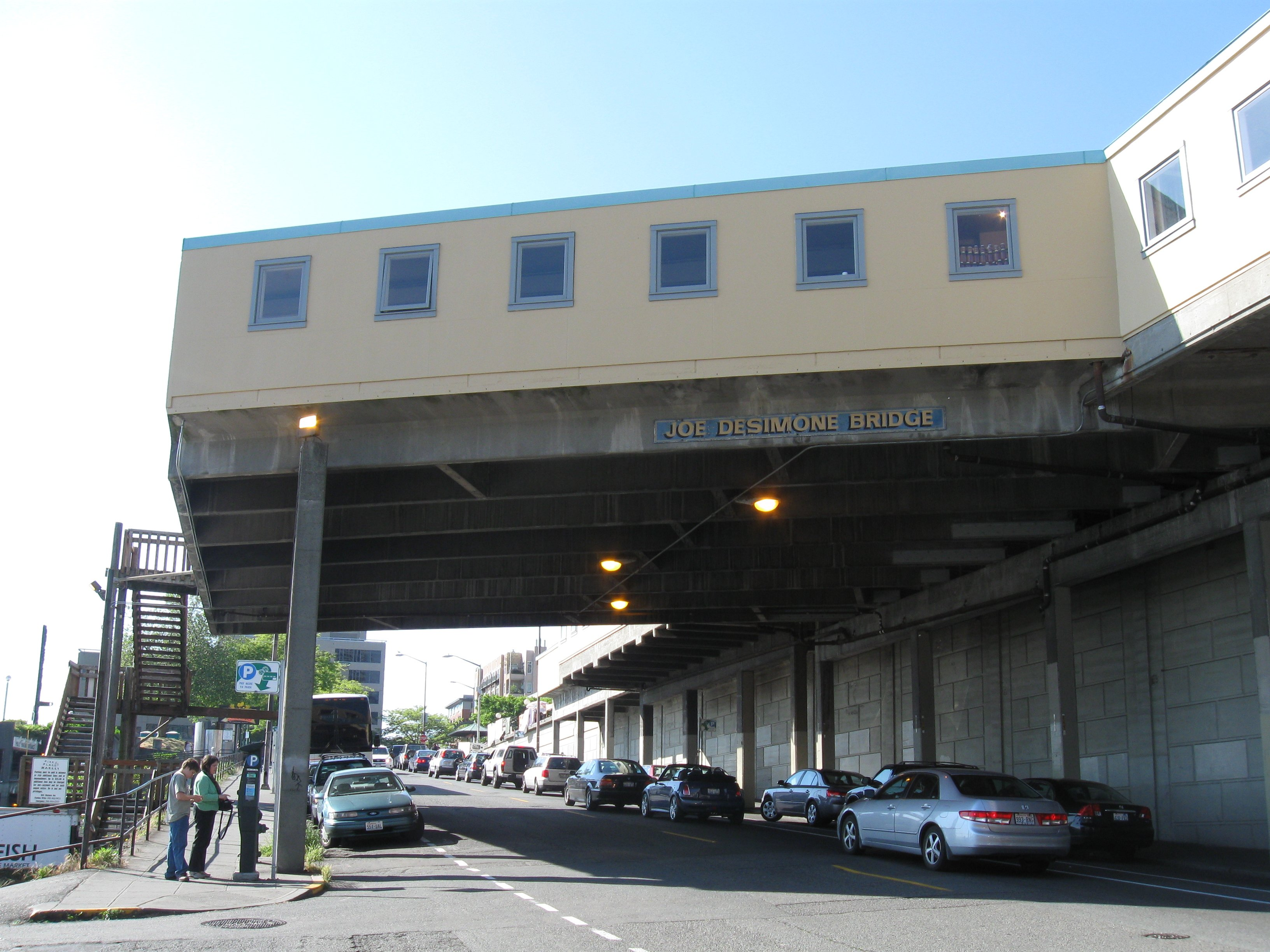
The Joe Desimone Bridge once connected the North Arcade to the now-demolished Municipal Market Building. It now contains craft-priority daystalls.

The Joe Desimone Bridge across Western Avenue originally connected the North Arcade to the Municipal Market Building (unknown, 1922 or 1924; demolished after a 1974 fire). The bridge is now enclosed on three sides (1985, James Cutler Architects) and used for craft-priority daystalls.

Other old buildings in the Market include the Champion Building (unknown, 1928; rehabilitation by the Champion/Turner Partnership 1977), originally a garage for the Dollar Cab Company, then a meat packing company, now ground floor retail with offices above; the Soames-Dunn Building (unknown, 1918; rehabilitation by Arne Bystrom 1976), once home to Dunn's Seeds and Soames Paper Company (who supplied paper bags to farmers selling in the Market), now retail, including the "original" Starbucks; Stewart House Hotel (unknown, 1902–1911; rehabilitation by Ibsen Nelson & Associates, 1982), a former workingmen's hotel, now retail and low-income housing; Seattle Garden Center (W. C. Geary, 1908; Art Deco details added 1930s; rehabilitation and addition, Arne Bystrom 1976) was once the Gem Egg Market and now houses Sur La Table; and the Fix-Madore Building (1916, unknown; rehabilitation by Bumgardner Partnership 1979), now an office and retail building on the west side of Western Avenue, connected to the Main Market by a footbridge.

Newer buildings in the Market include the Post Alley Market at First and Pine (Bassetti Norton Metler, 1983), the Inn at the Market (Ibsen Nelson & Associates, 1985); and The Pike and Virginia Building (Olson/Walker, 1978); and the Market Heritage Center (Scot Carr & Thomas Schaer, 1999). All of these echo at aspects of the architecture of the historic Market buildings. The Pike Street Hill Climb (Calvin and Gorasht, 1976) connects the Market to the waterfront; it occupies the same corridor that once (roughly 1911–1935) held a wooden overpass used by farmers to bring produce up to the Market after arriving by boat.

=== Listed buildings near the Market ===
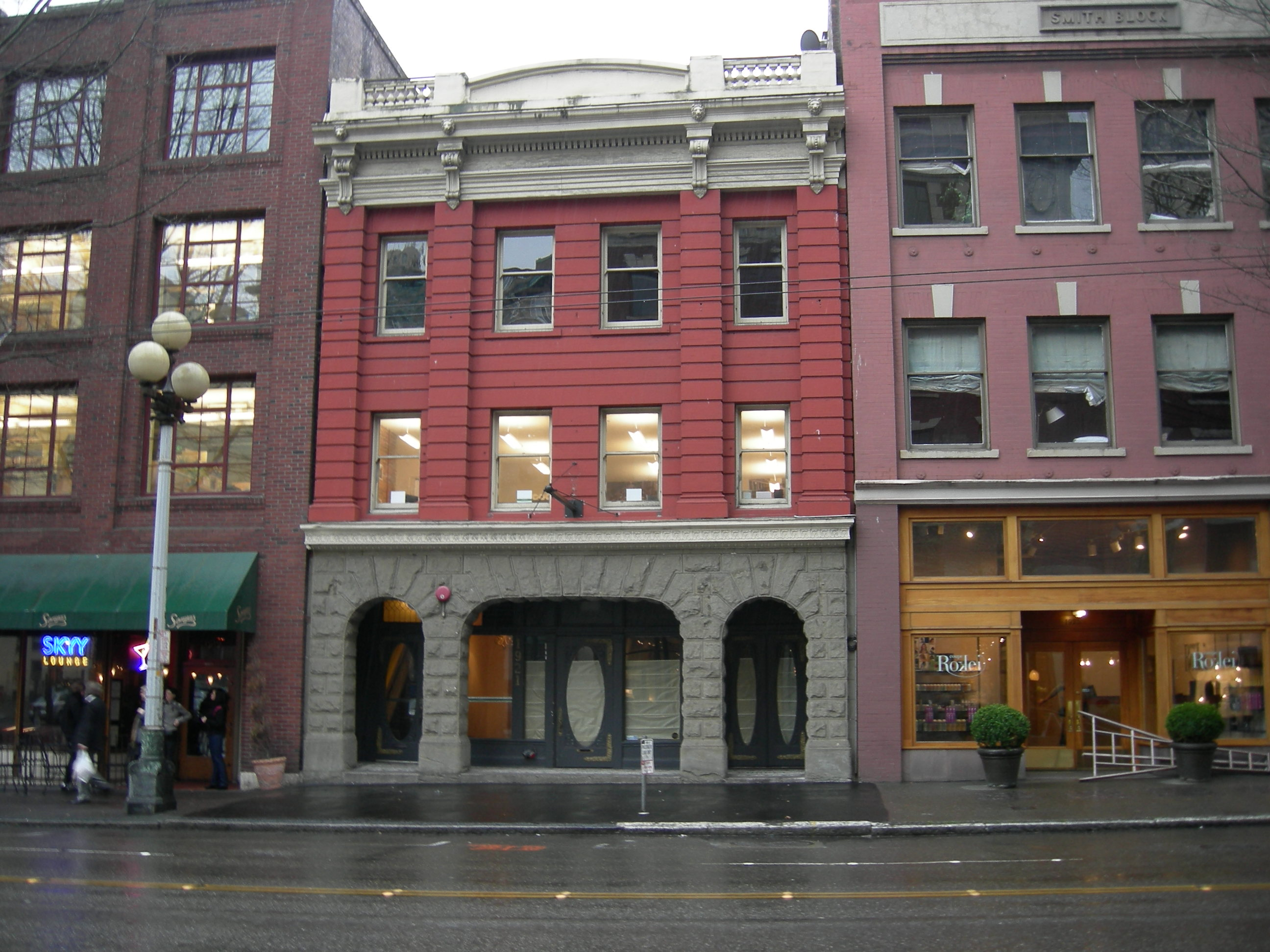
The Butterworth Building. At left, a portion of the Alaska Trade Building can also be seen, and at right the Smith Block (which dates from 1906 but is not a listed building). The three buildings were jointly restored by Ralph Anderson & Partners in 1977.

Along the southwest side of First Avenue, within the present-day historic district but outside of the original Market, the Alaska Trade Building (1915), 1915–1919 1st Avenue and the Late Victorian style Butterworth Building (originally the Butterworth mortuary, 1903), 1921 1st Avenue, are both listed in the National Register of Historic Places (NRHP). Outside the historic districts but within the City Clerk's definition of the Pike-Market neighborhood are the J. S. Graham Store (1919, designed by A. E. Doyle), 119 Pine Street; and the U.S. Immigration Building (1915), 84 Union Street. Other NRHP-listed buildings near the Market but outside of those boundaries include the Guiry and Schillestad Building (Young Hotel or Guiry Building 1903, Mystic Hotel or Schillestad Building 1908), 2101–2111 1st Avenue; the Renaissance-style New Washington Hotel (now Josephinum Hotel, built 1900–1949), 1902 Second Avenue; and the Moore Theatre and Hotel (1907), 1932 2nd Avenue.

Also in the Pike-Market neighborhood but outside the historic districts are at least two city-designated landmark not on the NRHP: the Terminal Sales Building (1923–1925), 1932 1st Avenue; and Pier 59, now home to the Seattle Aquarium.

== Transportation ==
The main arm of the market is located along the eponymous Pike Place, a two-block street that runs northwest for approximately 940 feet (290 m) between Pike Street and Virginia Street. From 1907 to 2025, the market was open to one-way automobile traffic despite its heavy pedestrian use. The street was previously only closed to automobiles during some events, but efforts to create a permanent pedestrian zone emerged in the early 21st century despite opposition from some market vendors and business owners. The closing of the street to vehicular traffic has been described as a "perennial issue" by the PDA due to Pike Place Market's status as a working market and the need for loading zones.

A trial period for the pedestrianization of Pike Place began in April 2025 due to nearby Seattle Public Utilities and Puget Sound Energy projects that resurfaced a section of the street. A sewer under Pike Place had undergone emergency repairs in 2024 and the permanent cobblestone and bricks between Pine and Virginia streets were planned to be installed. During the construction project, vehicular access during daytime hours was limited to deliveries, pickups, emergency vehicles, and vehicles with disabled passengers or drivers. The trial was originally scheduled to end in late August, but was extended into 2026 while the PDA evaluated a permanent version. The PDA cited positive feedback from customers and vendors, a year-over-year increase in foot traffic, and a reported increase in sales as indicators of support for a long-term pedestrianization system. Several types of vehicular barriers, including planters and movable fences, are planned to be installed at entrances to the market in April 2026.

The market is located near the Westlake Center transit hub, which is served by Link light rail at Westlake station, the Seattle Center Monorail, the South Lake Union Streetcar, and local buses. An extension of the streetcar, named the Center City Connector, was planned to stop on 1st Avenue adjacent to the market but is on hold due to funding shortfalls.

== See also ==
- Pacific Northwest cuisine
- Gum Wall
