= History of Pike Place Market =

Pike Place Market is a public market in Seattle, Washington founded in 1907. Throughout its history, in spite of various challenges brought about by changing ordinances and planning initiatives, it has operated without major interruptions, making it one of the oldest continuously operated public farmers' markets in the United States. It was created when city councilman Thomas P. Revelle took advantage of the precedent of an 1896 Seattle city ordinance that allowed the city to designate tracts of land as public markets, and designated a portion of the area of Western Avenue above the Elliott Bay tideflats off Pike Street and First Avenue. The first building at the Market opened November 30, 1907. During the early 1920s, the north side of the Corner Market became known as the Sanitary Market, and the area developed into a social scene. A new ordinance forbidding farmers' stalls to be placed in the street resulted in proposals to move the market, but in 1921 council voted to retain the existing location and work on expanding in place.

In 1963, a proposal was floated to demolish Pike Place Market and replace it with Pike Plaza, which met community opposition, including help from prominent individuals within the board of Friends of the Market. An initiative was passed on November 2, 1971, that created a historic preservation zone. As a part of this, the city founded the Pike Place Market Preservation and Development Authority (PDA) to run the Market.

In the 1980s, a nonprofit group, the Pike Place Market Foundation, was established by the PDA to raise funds and administer the Market's free clinic, senior center, low-income housing, and childcare center. The 1983 Hildt Amendment or Hildt Agreement struck a balance between farmers and craftspeople in the daystalls which set a precedent for allocation of daystalls. In 1998, the PDA ended the Hildt Agreement; a new agreement, the Licata-Hildt agreement, was adopted in February 1999. In 2008, Seattle voters approved a six-year property-tax levy to fund critical repairs and improvements, which were completed in 2012.

== Before the Market ==
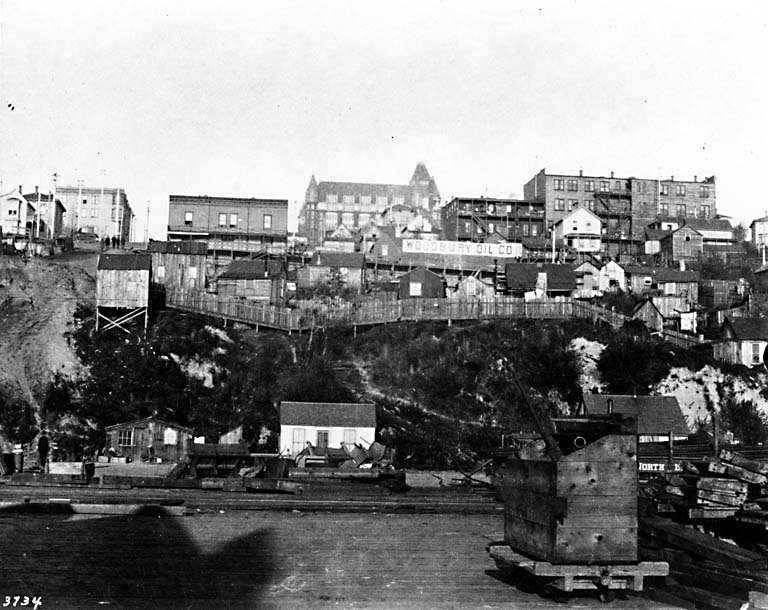
Looking east from the Elliott Bay waterfront between Stewart and Virginia Streets. The dirt track rising at left is part of Stewart Street. The first Washington Hotel (1891–1906, center, background) sits atop the small, steep Denny Hill, regraded in 1906–1907. This is taken from somewhere near Railroad Avenue, the present-day Alaskan Way.

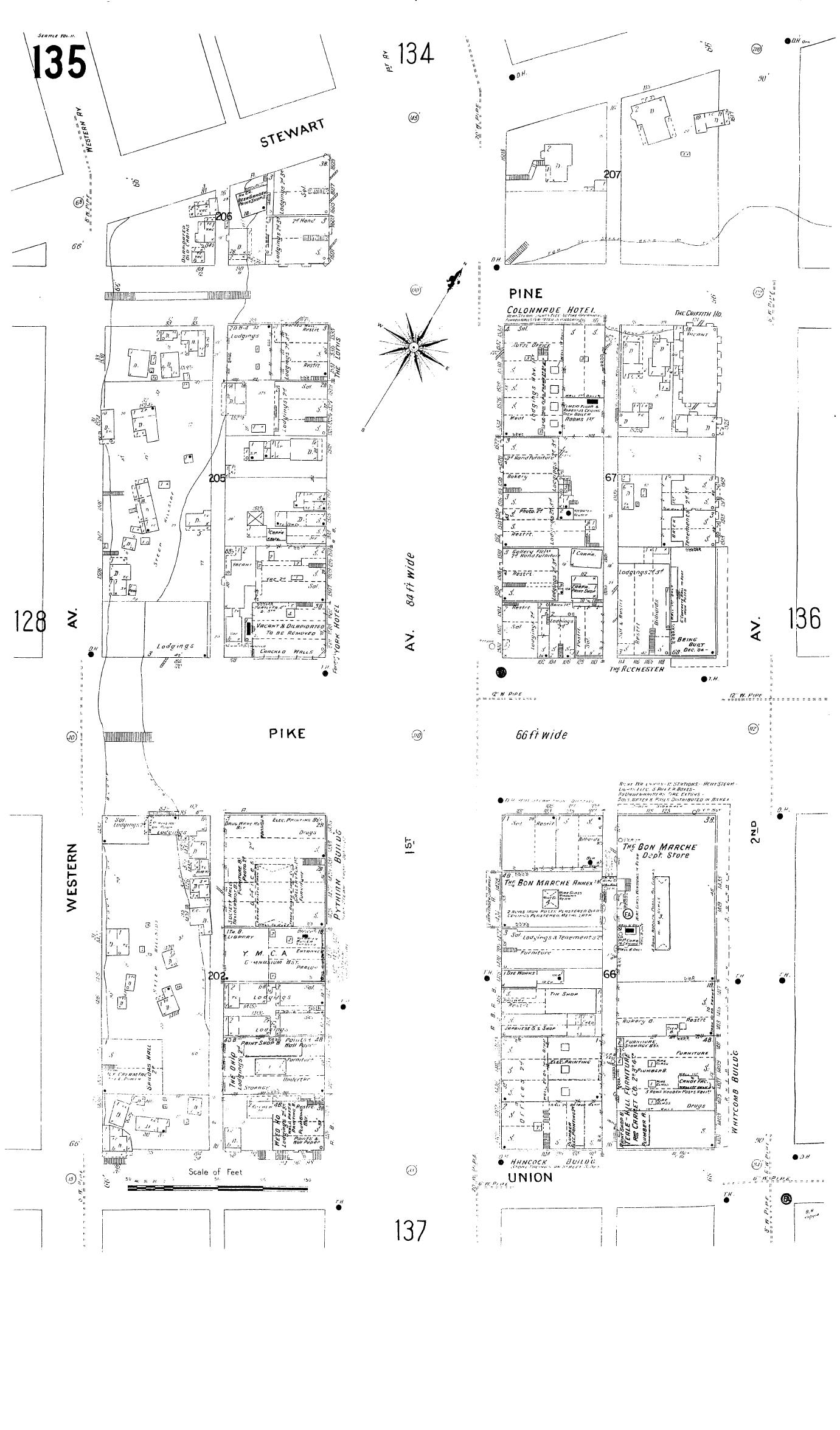
This 1905 Sanborn map, dating from just before the founding of the Market (and before Pike Place was built), shows the heart of today's Market. The intersection near the center of the map is the corner of First and Pike.

Before the creation of the Pike Place Market in 1907, local Seattle area farmers sold their goods to the public in a three-square block area called The Lots, located at Sixth Avenue and King Street. Most produce sold at The Lots would then be brought to commercial wholesale houses on Western Avenue, which became known as Produce Row. Most farmers, due to the amount of time required to work their farms, were forced to sell their produce on consignment through the wholesalers on Western Avenue. The farmers typically received a percentage of the final sale price for their goods. They would sell to the middleman on commission, as most farmers would often have no time to sell direct to the public, and their earnings would be on marked-up prices and expected sales. In some cases, the farmers made a profit, but just as often found themselves breaking even, or getting no money at all due to the business practices of the wholesalers. During the existence of the wholesale houses, which far predated the Market, there were regular rumors as well as instances of corruption in denying payment to farmers.

== Founding ==
As consumers and farmers grew increasingly vocal in their unhappiness over the situation, Thomas P. Revelle, a Seattle City Councilman, lawyer, and newspaper editor, took advantage of the precedent of an 1896 Seattle city ordinance that allowed the city to designate tracts of land as public markets. The area of Western Avenue above the Elliott Bay tideflats and the area of the commission food houses had just been turned into a wooden planked road, called Pike Place, off of Pike Street and First Avenue. Through a city council ordinance vote on August 5, 1907, he had part of Pike Place designated temporarily as a public market for the "sales of garden, farm and other food products from wagons...".

On Saturday, August 17, 1907, City Council President Charles Hiram Burnett Jr., filling in for the elected mayor as Acting Mayor of Seattle, declared the day Public Market Day and cut the ribbon. In the week leading up to the opening of the Pike Place Market, various rumors and stories of further corruption were reported by the Seattle Times. Roughly ten farmers pulled up their wagons on a boardwalk adjacent to the Leland Hotel. The Times alleged several reasons for the low turnout of farmers: Western Avenue wholesale commission men who had gone to the nearby valleys and farms to buy all the produce out ahead of time to ruin the event; threats of violence by commission men against farmers; and farmers' fear of possible boycotts and lack of business with the commission men if the Market idea did not succeed in the long term. Hundreds of customers soon arrived, and before noon that day, all the farmers' produce had sold out.

== First expansion years ==
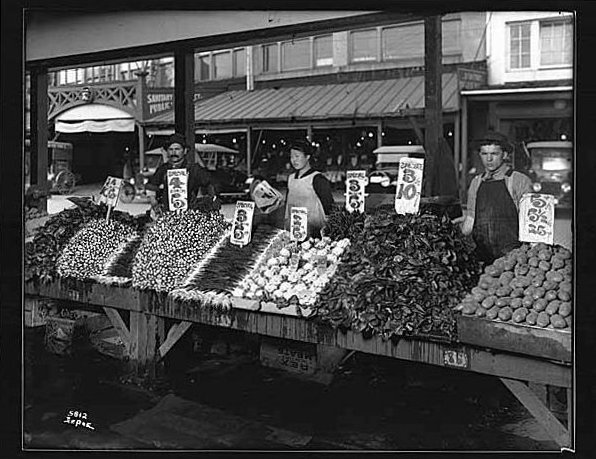
Vegetable vendors selling from Main Arcade daystalls, 1917. Part of the Sanitary Market and Corner Market are visible across Pike Place.

In 1907 Frank Goodwin owned Goodwin Real Estate Company in Seattle, together with his brothers Ervin and John. Headquartered in the city's Alaska Building, they owned the Leland Hotel on Pike Street and the undeveloped tracts of land that surrounded Pike Place along the Western Avenue bluff. On the opening day of the Market, Goodwin observed the early morning chaos of farmers dealing with large crowds. Sensing that their land was about to appreciate in value, they began to heavily advertise adjoining plots for sale. Work began immediately on what is today the Main Arcade of the Pike Place Market, northwest of and adjoining the Leland Hotel.

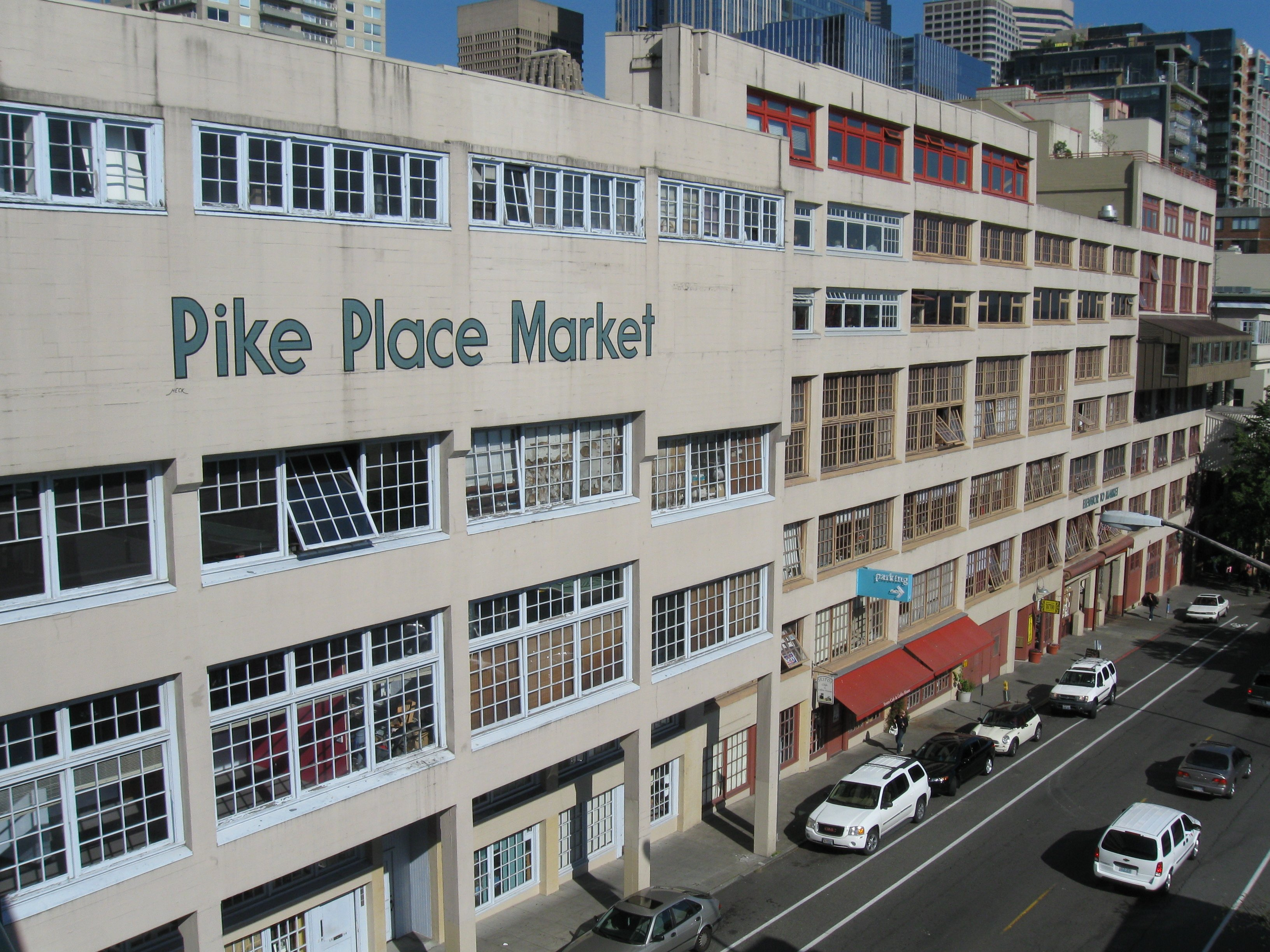
Pike Place Market in 2008, as seen from above Western Avenue.

The first building at the Market, the Main Arcade, opened November 30, 1907. At its opening, a forty-piece band performed for a large cheering crowd. During the early years of the Pike Place Market, Seattle city ordinances limited its hours of operation to only 5 am to 12 noon, Monday through Saturday, and placed initial supervision of the facility with the city Department of Streets and Sewers. Local police gave out vendor stalls to farmers on a first come, first served basis. In 1910, two farmers' associations organized themselves: the Washington Farmers Association represented Japanese farmers; other farmers organized as the White Home Growers Association.

By 1911, demand for the Market had grown so much that the number of available stalls had doubled, and extended north from Pike Street to Stewart Street, doubling in size since the opening of the Main Arcade. The west side of the stall lines were soon covered in an overhead canopy and roofing, becoming known as the "dry row". The last of the core buildings of the Market for the coming decades was obtained in 1916 by the Goodwins, when they purchased a long-term lease on the Bartell Building at the corner of 1st Avenue and Pike Street. Renamed to the Economy Market, it became an expansion to the Main Arcade.

On February 6, 1919, nearly all of Seattle's labor unions took part in a work stoppage. News of this began to spread days earlier in the local newspapers, leading to a panicked run on the goods at the Market. The labor strike affected the delivery of goods to the Market, and lasted five days, during which the Market was nearly deserted. It would become the longest period of inactivity in the history of the Pike Place Market.

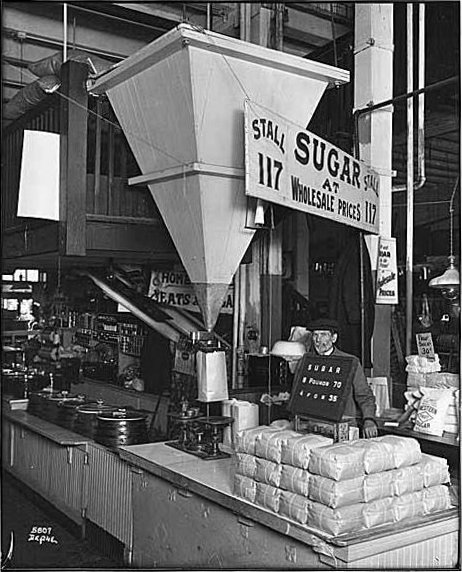
Sugar vendor, 1917

Throughout the early 1920s, the north side of the Corner Market became known as the Sanitary Market, housing delicatessens, butchers, restaurants, and bakeries. The so-called mosquito fleet, the precursor to the modern Washington State Ferry system, would bring shoppers from various islands in Puget Sound to shop, and Market vendors began to bring goods directly to the docks for sales. Colman Dock and Pier 3 (now known as Pier 54) were within walking distance, and the persons coming to sell their wares at the market would disembark from the steamers at these docks. The area became a social scene, where young Seattle locals went to see and be seen.

In September 1920, the Seattle City Council quietly passed an ordinance that farmer's stalls at the Market could no longer be placed in the street, in response to complaints from some local businesses about traffic flow. A public outcry immediately followed from the farmers, merchants, and various citizen's groups. In the midst of the turmoil, the Westlake Market Company pushed itself into the situation, proposing that they would build a two-floor underground market at a building they owned on Fifth Avenue, four blocks from the existing Pike Place Market. The Goodwins, in response, proposed another counter-plan to leverage insurance bonds to finance another further expansion of the Market. As the city government began to quickly lean towards the Westlake proposal, the farmers began to formally organize together for the first time to protect their interests. The deciding Seattle City Council vote in April 1921 was in favor of retaining the existing Market location, and the Goodwins immediately began work on their next expansions.

== World War II era ==
At the time of the bombing of Pearl Harbor in December 1941, many of the farmers selling in Pike Place Market were Japanese-Americans. The late Seattle historian Walt Crowley estimated that they might have been as many as four-fifths of the farmers selling produce from stalls. President Franklin D. Roosevelt signed Executive Order 9066 on February 19, 1942, which eventually forced all Americans of Japanese ancestry in an "exclusion zone" that included the entirety of the West Coast states and southern Arizona into internment camps. On March 11, Executive Order 9095 created the Office of Alien Property Custodian and gave it discretionary, plenary authority over all alien property interests. Many assets were frozen, creating immediate financial difficulty for the affected aliens, preventing most from moving out of the exclusion zones. Many Japanese Americans were effectively dispossessed.

== Preservation and second expansion of the Market ==
In 1963, a proposal was floated to demolish Pike Place Market and replace it with Pike Plaza, which would include a hotel, an apartment building, four office buildings, a hockey arena, and a parking garage. This was supported by the mayor, many on the city council, and a number of market property owners. However, there was significant community opposition, including help from Betty Bowen, Victor Steinbrueck, Ibsen Nelsen, and others from the board of Friends of the Market. An initiative was passed on November 2, 1971, that created a historic preservation zone and returned the Market to public hands. The Pike Place Market Preservation and Development Authority was created by the city to run the Market. Over the course of the 1970s, all the Market's historic buildings were restored and renovated using the original plans and blueprints and appropriate materials.

== Battle for ownership of the Market ==
In the 1980s, federal welfare reform squeezed the social services based in the Market. As a result, a nonprofit group, the Pike Place Market Foundation, was established by the PDA to raise funds and administer the Market's free clinic, senior center, low-income housing, and childcare center. Also in the 1980s the wooden floors on the top arcade were replaced with tiles (so as to prevent water damage to merchandise on the lower floors) that were laid by the PDA after staging a hugely successful capital campaign – people could pay $35 to have their name(s) inscribed on a tile. Between 1985 and 1987, more than 45,000 tiles were installed and nearly $1.6 million was raised.

The 1983 Hildt Amendment or Hildt Agreement (Note: named after Seattle City Council member Michael Hildt) struck a balance between farmers and craftspeople in the daystalls. The agreement set rules that would last for ten years from August 1, 1983, and that would be successively renewable for further terms of five years. The precise formula it laid out stood for over 15 years, and it set the precedent for today's allocation of daystalls, in that it gave craftspeople priority in the North Arcade and farmers priority elsewhere.

== Victor Steinbrueck Park ==
Victor Steinbrueck Park directly north of the market was originally Market Park. From about 1909 the site held an armory, which was damaged by fire in 1962. The land was taken over by the city in 1968, and the remnant of the armory was razed. In 1970 the land passed to park usage. The resulting Market Park was largely redesigned in 1982. It was renamed in 1985 after the late Victor Steinbrueck, who was instrumental in the market's preservation.

== Modern day ==
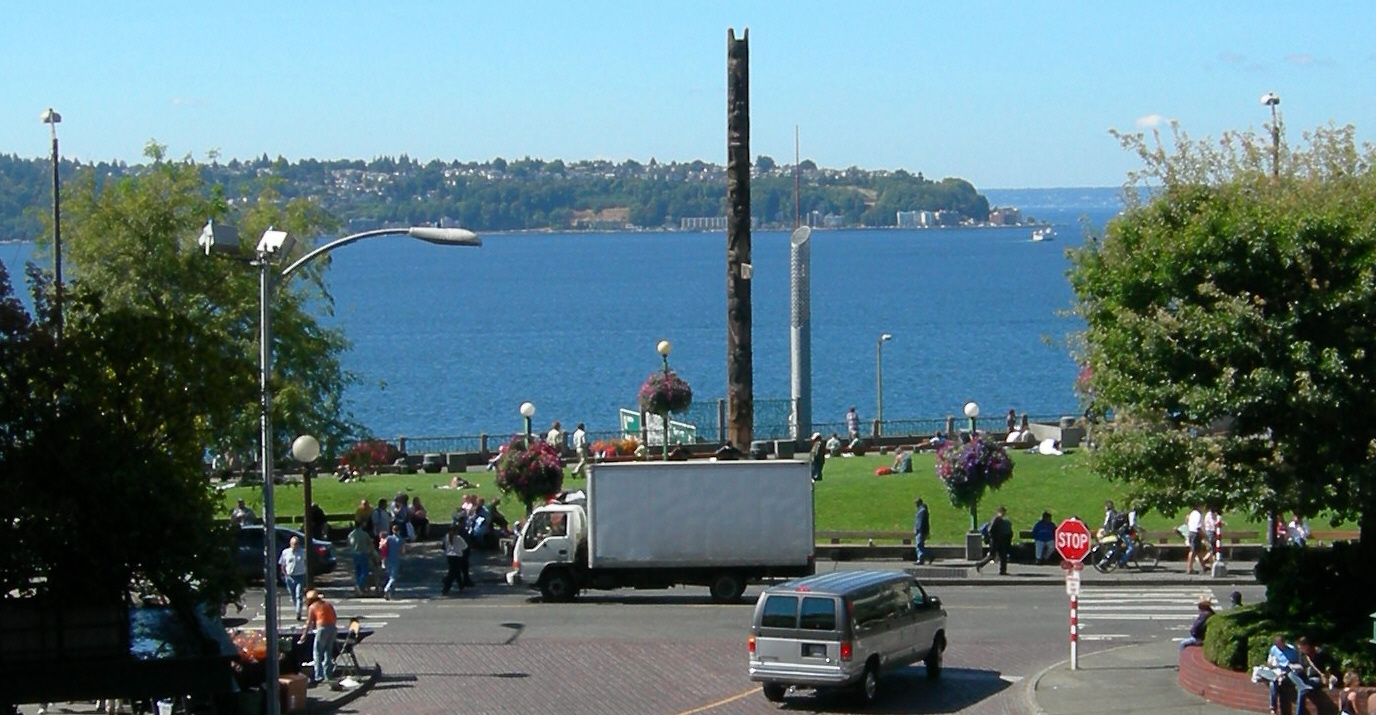
Victor Steinbrueck Park

In 1998, the PDA decided to end the Hildt Agreement. While their proposed new rule to allocate daystalls was generally seen as more favorable to farmers, there were both farmers and craftspeople who objected, especially because the PDA's timing gave them little chance to study the changes. At their last meeting before the August 1 deadline, the PDA voted 8–4, to notify the city of its intent not to renew the Agreement. The City Council did not accept the proposed substitute. The council and PDA extended the Hildt agreement 9 months and the council agreed to an extensive public review process in which the Market Constituency played a major role.

The public meetings did not result in a clear consensus, but did provide enough input for city councilmember Nick Licata to draft a revised version of the Hildt Agreement. Adopted in February 1999, it became known as the Licata-Hildt Agreement. The bad blood generated by the conflict spurred an audit of PDA practices by the City Auditor; the audit was critical of the PDA for occasionally violating the spirit of its Charter, but exonerated it of any wrongdoing.

=== Centennial ===
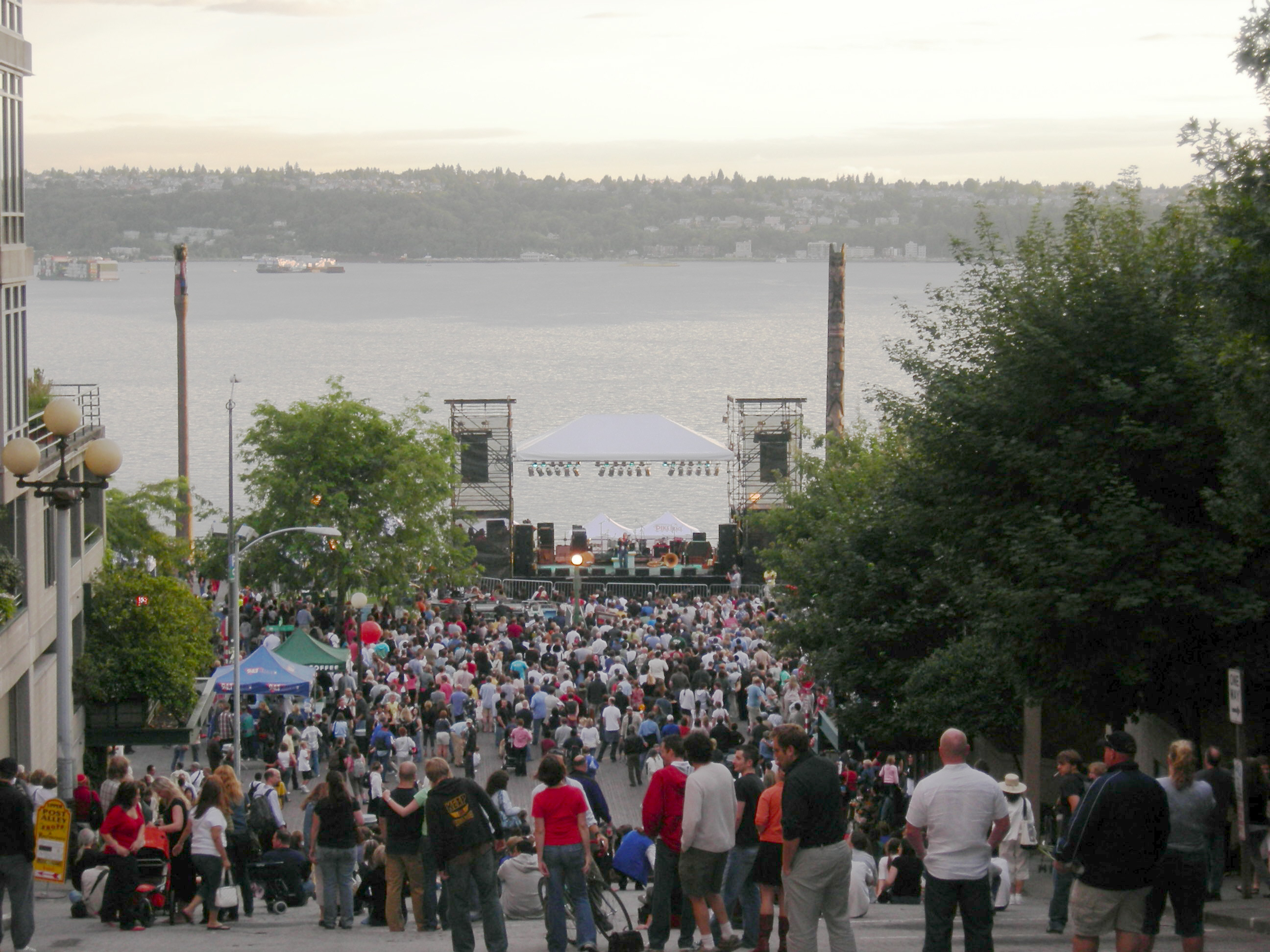
Pike Place Market Centennial celebration, August 17, 2007: start of concert

Pike Place Market celebrated its 100-year anniversary on August 17, 2007. A wide variety of activities and events took place, and a concert was held in Victor Steinbrueck Park in the evening, consisting entirely of songs related in one way or another to Seattle. The "house band" for the concert called itself The Iconics, and consisted of Dave Dederer and Andrew McKeag (guitarists of the Presidents of the United States of America or PUSA); Mike Musberger (drummer of The Posies and The Fastbacks); Jeff Fielder (bassist for singer/songwriter Sera Cahoone); and Ty Bailie (keyboard player of Department of Energy). Other performers included Chris Ballew (also of PUSA), Sean Nelson of Harvey Danger, Choklate, Paul Jensen of the Dudley Manlove Quartet, Rachel Flotard of Visqueen, Shawn Smith of Brad, Stone Gossard and Mike McCready of Pearl Jam, John Roderick of the Long Winters, Evan Foster of the Boss Martians, Artis the Spoonman, Ernestine Anderson, and the Total Experience Gospel Choir.

=== Renovation ===
In 2008, Seattle voters approved a six-year property-tax levy to fund critical repairs and improvements. Basic infrastructure was failing and the nine-acre site had fallen well behind standards for safety, accessibility and environmental stewardship. The architecture firm SRG Partnership was hired to design the renovation. Completed in 2012, the renovation was designed to preserve the character of the campus while giving the buildings comprehensive upgrades that achieve full compliance with City codes and standards.
