= Peter Gelderloos =

American anarchist

- Born: Peter Alan Gelderloos; 1981 or 1982 (age 43–44); Morristown, New Jersey, U.S.
- Notable work: How Nonviolence Protects the State (2005); Anarchy Works (2010); The Failure of Nonviolence (2013); Worshipping Power: An Anarchist View of Early State Formation (2017)
- Movement: Anarchism
- Website: Surviving Leviathan with Peter Gelderloos newsletter on Substack

Peter Gelderloos (born 1981 or 1982) is an American anarchist activist and writer.

== Biography ==
Gelderloos first became involved in political issues as a high school student, and described the Seattle WTO protests in November 1999 as helping influence his political development.

In November 2001, Gelderloos was arrested with 30 others for trespass in protest of the American military training facility School of the Americas, which trains Latin American military and police. He represented himself in court and was sentenced to six months in prison. Gelderloos previously organized a student rally against the Iraq War and was a member of a copwatch program in Harrisonburg.

In April 2007, Gelderloos was arrested in Spain and charged with disorderly conduct and illegal demonstration during a squatters' protest. He faced up to six years in prison. According to Gelderloos, he was arrested as a bystander after someone had set off a firework designed to scatter fliers through the air. He claimed that he was unfairly targeted for his political beliefs. He was acquitted in 2009.

He is known for his 2005 book, How Nonviolence Protects the State, which has been cited in works discussing and analyzing forms of violent and nonviolent resistance. He has written for the publications In These Times and ROAR Magazine. In a review of his 2017 work Worshiping Power: An Anarchist View of Early State Formation, William Gillis described him as "an anarchist committed to making anarchist theory accessible" and "within our movement [...] probably the least controversial anarchist writer alive".

In 2024, he co-produced It’s Revolution or Death, a documentary series focused on the global climate crisis, in collaboration with media collective subMedia.Tv.

== Works ==
- — (2024). Organization, Continuity, Community. Detritus Books.
- — (2024). They Will Beat the Memory Out of Us : Forcing Nonviolence on Forgetful Movements. London: Pluto Press.
- — (2022). The Solutions Are Already Here: Strategies of Ecological Revolution From Below. London: Pluto Press.
- — (2017). Worshipping Power: An Anarchist View of Early State Formation. Oakland: AK Press.
- — (2014). Learning From Ferguson (PDF). Seattle: Left Bank Books.
- — (2013). The Failure of Nonviolence: From the Arab Spring to Occupy. Seattle: Left Bank Books.
- — (2010). Anarchy Works. San Francisco: Ardent Press.
- — (2010). To Get to the Other Side: a journey through Europe and its anarchist movements. Archived from the original on November 26, 2020.
- — (2009). Sousa in the Echo Chamber. Homebound Books.
- — (2007). How Nonviolence Protects the State. Boston: South End Press. ISBN 978-0-89608-772-9.
- — (2006). Consensus: A New Handbook for Grassroots Social, Political, and Environmental Groups. Tucson: See Sharp Press. ISBN 978-1-884365-39-3.
- — (2005). How Nonviolence Protects the State. Harrisonburg: Signalfire Press.
- — (2004). What is Democracy?. Tucson: See Sharp Press. ISBN 978-0-00-005219-3.

== See also ==
- Anarchism and violence
