= Corner market =

A corner market is a type of convenience store.

It can also refer to:

- Corner Market - a store in Seattle, Washington.
