= Ellenos Real Greek Yogurt =

Yogurt company based in Seattle, Washington, U.S.

Coordinates: 47.6089°N 122.3404°W

- Logo

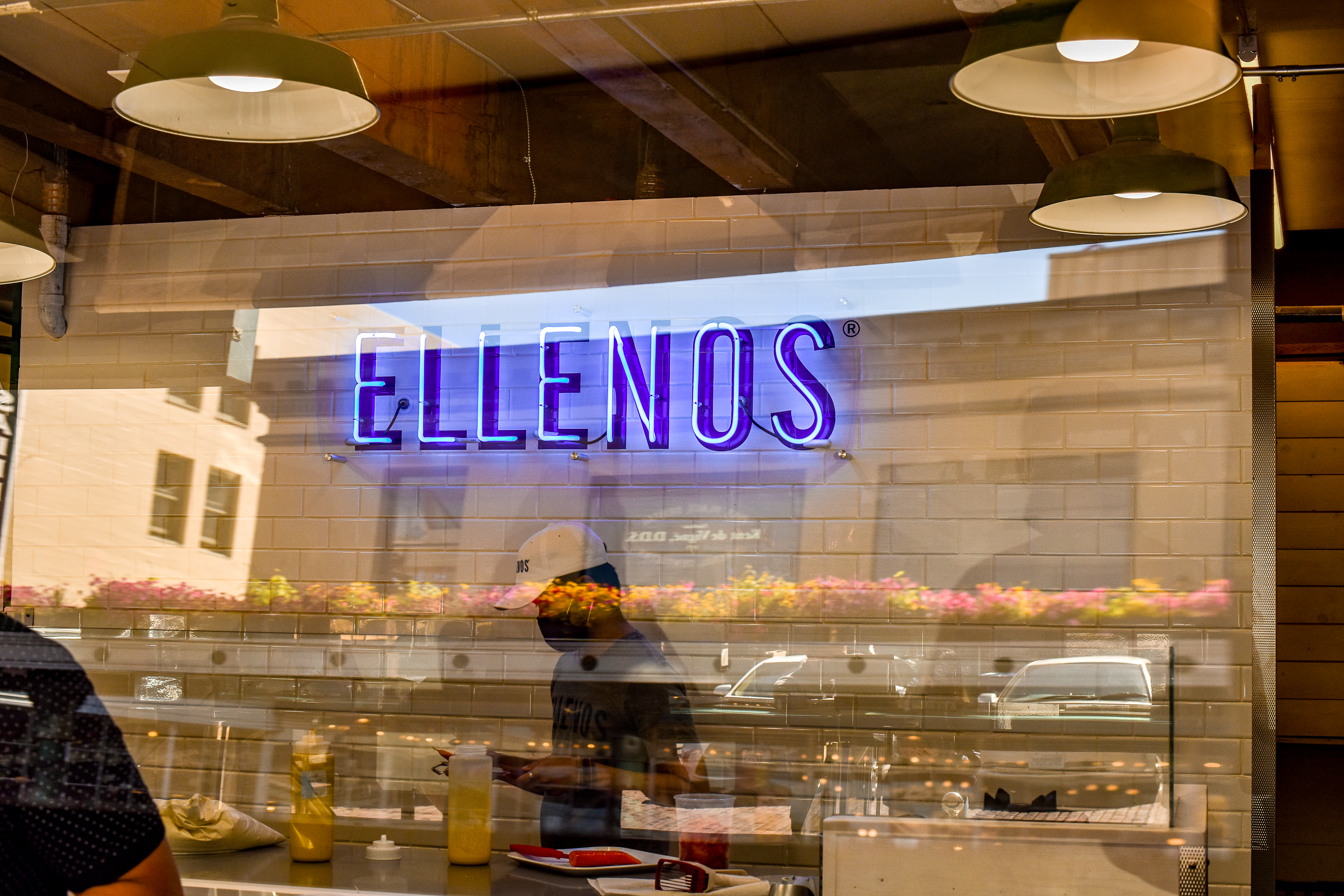
- Products: Yogurt
- Number of employees: 150 (2020)
- Website: ellenos.com

Ellenos Real Greek Yogurt is a yogurt company which originated at Pike Place Market, in the U.S. state of Washington.

== Description ==
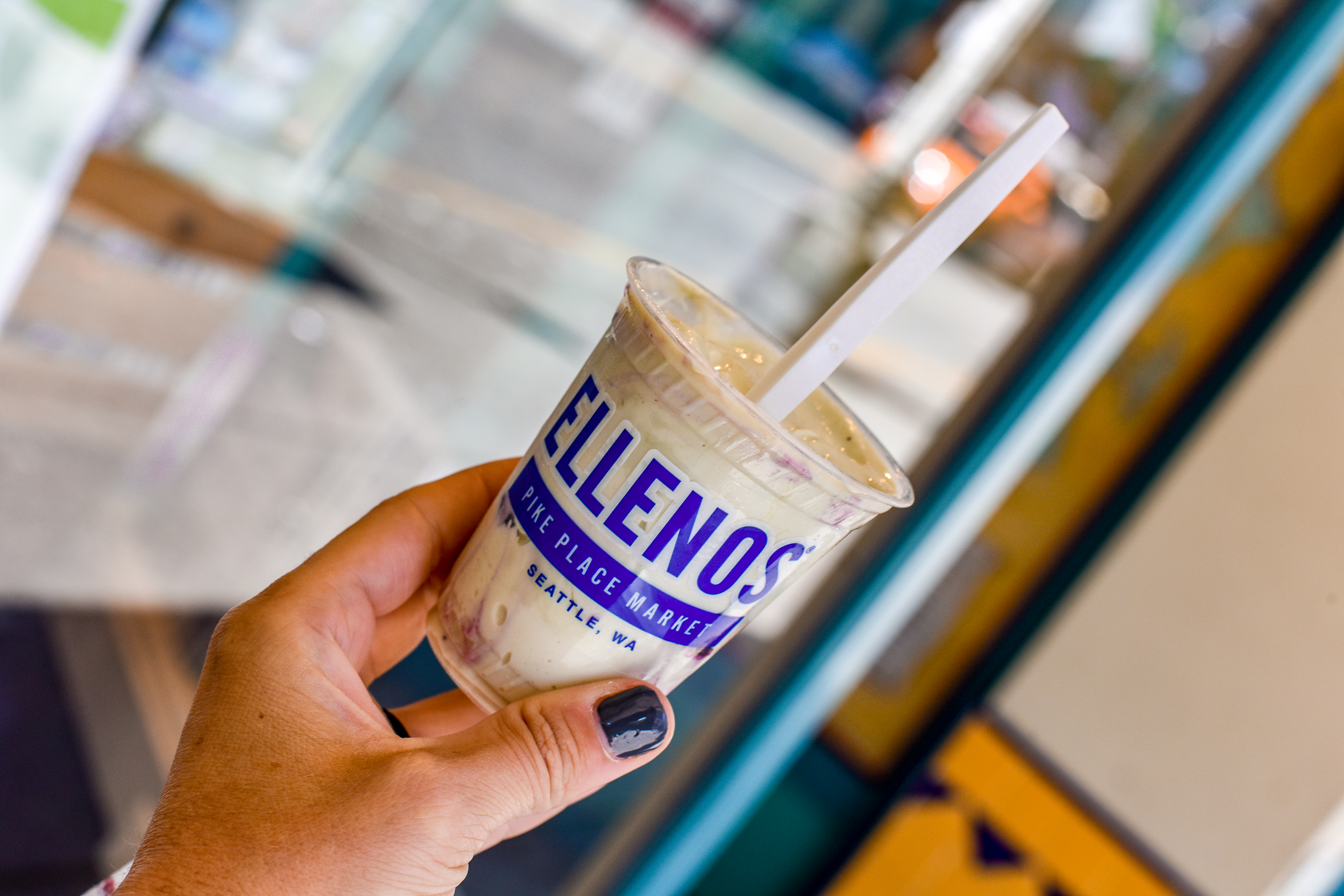
A serving of Ellenos Real Greek Yogurt

The company makes Greek-style yogurt in a variety of flavors such as blueberry, lemon curd, marionberry, pumpkin pie (seasonally), and raspberry. Yogurts have all-natural toppings and fruit. In addition to the small counter in the Corner Market building at Pike Place Market, the yogurt has been available at various farmers' markets, the Uwajimaya stores in Bellevue and the Chinatown-International District, and the Beecher's Handmade Cheese outpost at Seattle–Tacoma International Airport.

== History ==
Co-owners Bob Klein and Con Apostolopoulos founded the business at Pike Place Market in July 2013, with yogurt made at a retail site in the Georgetown neighborhood. However, Ellenos was quickly closed temporarily by the Historic Commission for selling products in a market area reserves for produce. Service resumed in August. In 2016, Whole Foods Market provided a loan for Ellenos to purchase machinery to increase production.

In 2018, an $18 million investment from Monogram Capital Partners allowed Ellenos to increase capacity at a 60,000-square-foot facility in Federal Way.

The company had approximately 150 employees as of February 2020. In 2020, Daniel Lubetzky announced plans to invest $18 million into the brand, with funding intended to expand staff and the production facility in Federal Way in order to reach a larger customer base.

== Reception ==
Fodor's says, "Ellenos is serving up the best (and best-looking) yogurt in the city—and possibly the country." Sonja Groset included the business in Eater Seattle's 2015 "Guide to the Best Cheap Eats at Pike Place Market". In 2016, Rachel Belle of The Stranger wrote, "Ellenos is like the Elvis of yogurt. After dipping your spoon into their "traditional family recipe" of ethereally smooth, thick, luscious Greek yogurt, you will want to passionately scream and cry and faint and throw your panties at it." Naomi Tomky included the business in Thrillist's 2020 list of "The 27 Most Essential Seattle Food Experiences".
