= Mercer Girls =

Women moving to the Seattle area in 1860s

The Mercer Girls or Mercer Maids were women who chose to move from the east coast of the United States to the Seattle area in the 1860s at the invitation of Asa Mercer. Mercer, an American who lived in Seattle, wanted to "import" women to the Pacific Northwest to balance the gender ratio. The women were drawn by the prospect of moving to a boomtown with a surplus of bachelors. These events formed the basis of the television series Here Come the Brides.

== First expedition ==
Frontier Seattle attracted numerous men to work in the timber and fishing industries, but very few single women were willing to relocate by themselves to the remote Pacific Northwest. Only one adult out of ten was a woman, and most girls over 15 were already engaged. White men, and women of the Salish tribes, did not always feel mutually attracted.

Not earlier than 1853, Mary Ann Boyer managed a two-story building, Felker House, for Captain Leonard Felker, as a hotel with a brothel upstairs.

Prostitutes were also scarce, until 1861, with the arrival of John W. Pinell from San Francisco opening his brothel, Illahee, with Native American women prostitutes.

In 1864, Asa Mercer decided to go east to find women willing to relocate to Puget Sound. Mercer first enlisted prominent local married couples to act as hosts for the women once they arrived to assuage Victorian era moral concerns over the propriety of importing single women to the frontier. Mercer also had support from the governor of Washington Territory, but the government could not offer any money.

Mercer proceeded to travel to Boston and later to the textile town of Lowell and recruited eight young women from Lowell and two from the nearby community of Townsend willing to move to the other side of the country. They traveled back through the Isthmus of Panama, although in San Francisco locals tried to convince the girls to stay there instead. They arrived in Seattle on May 16, 1864, where the community staged a grand welcome on the grounds of the Territorial University.

Only eleven women undertook the journey, well under the fifty initially reported in The Seattle Gazette. The Mercer Girls of the first voyage were Annie May Adams, Antoinette Josephine Baker, Sarah Cheney, Aurelia Coffin, Sarah Jane Gallagher, Maria Murphy, Elizabeth Ordway, Georgia Pearson, Josephine Pearson, Catherine Stevens, and Katherine Stickney. Daniel Pearson and Rodolphus Stevens, the fathers of three of the young women, completed the westward party.

All but two of the women were married in short order: Josie Pearson who died unexpectedly a short time after she arrived, and Ordway, the oldest of the ladies who was 35 when she arrived in Seattle with Mercer. Mercer was subsequently elected to the Territorial Legislature.

== Second expedition ==
Mercer decided to try again on a larger scale in 1865, and again collected donations from willing men. He asked for $300 to bring a suitable wife and received hundreds of applications. However, in the aftermath of Abraham Lincoln's assassination, his next trip east went wrong, until speculator Ben Holladay promised to provide transport for the women. However, the New York Herald found out about the project and wrote that all the women were destined to waterfront dives or to be wives of old men. Authorities in Massachusetts were not sympathetic, either.

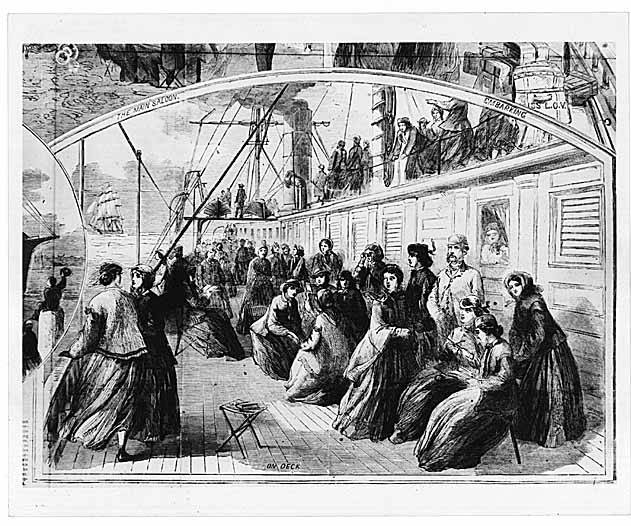
The Mercer Girls on deck aboard the Continental, sketched by A.R. Waud for Harper's Weekly, 1866.

Due to the bad publicity by the time Mercer was to depart on January 16, 1866, he had fewer than 100 recruits, when he had promised five times that many. His ship, the former Civil War transport S.S. Continental, sailed for the West Coast around Cape Horn.

Three months later, the ship stopped in San Francisco, where the captain refused to go any further. Mercer failed to convince him otherwise, and when he telegraphed to Washington governor Pickering to ask for more money, the governor could not afford it. Finally, he convinced crewmen on lumber schooners to transport them for free. Among the financiers of the expedition had been Hiram Burnett, a lumber mill manager for Pope & Talbot, who was bringing out his sister and wanted wives for his employees. A few of the women decided to stay in California instead.

When Mercer returned to Seattle, he had to answer a number of questions about his performance. At a meeting on May 23, public dismay softened, probably because the women were with him.

Mercer ended up marrying one of the women, Annie Stephens, a week later, and most of the others found husbands as well.

== See also ==
- History of Seattle
- Bigelow House Museum
