= Sanitary Public Market =

Sanitary Public Market may refer to:

- Sanitary Market, Pike Place Market, Seattle, Washington, U.S.
- Sanitary Public Market, Sunken Gardens (Florida)
