= Hiram Burnett =

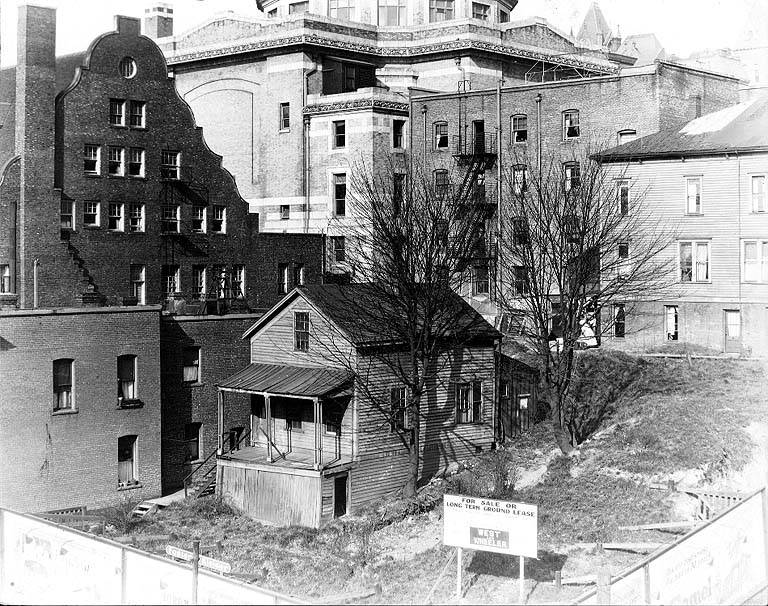
The Burnett house in Downtown Seattle was built in 1865 and survived into the 1920s. It can be seen here with the Rainier Club at left and First Methodist Episcopal Church (now Daniels Recital Hall) in the center background.

Hiram Burnett (July 5, 1817, Southborough, Massachusetts – April 25, 1906, Seattle, Washington) was an American lumberman, a pioneer of the Puget Sound country, and an honored citizen of Seattle.

== Family and early life ==
Hiram Burnett was born on July 5, 1817, in Southborough, Massachusetts. His parents were Charles Ripley Burnett and Kezia (Pond) Burnett, both natives of Southborough, Massachusetts and descendants of colony pioneer ancestry, all of whom followed agricultural pursuits. His father and grandfather made ropes and harnesses as well as farmed.

Hiram Burnett's brother Joseph Burnett was a chemical inventor who originated American manufacture of vanilla extract and founded St. Mark's School in Southborough. Hiram's brother Henry Burnett a fireman and sister Mrs. Parker a widow later Mrs Burnell joined him in Seattle. Hiram Burnett arranged passage for them with Asa Mercer.

He was educated in the public schools of the town of Southborough, Massachusetts and at the city of Worcester, Massachusetts. At the age of eighteen years he began learning the carpenter's trade in Framingham, and after four years of service went to Slatersville, Rhode Island, where he continued in that occupation.

He was married in Lowell, Massachusetts, in 1845, to Miss Elizabeth Merriam Gibbs of Framingham, and continued to reside in the State of Rhode Island until 1852, when, after providing comfortable arrangements for his family he started for California. Arriving in San Francisco, he found ready employment in one of the planing mills at $7 per day.

== Career ==
He remained in San Francisco from 1852 until 1855, and then moved to Port Gamble, Washington under engagement with the Puget Mill Company, (a company controlled by the Pope & Talbot families as superintendent of their planing mill, in 1856 he returned to spend some time East for his family, but instead of returning at once to the Pacific coast he located for a while near Lawrence, Kansas. While in Massachusetts he was influenced by the abolitionist Rev. Thomas Wentworth Higginson to join the Massachusetts Emigrant Aid Company and take a part in the struggle known as Bleeding Kansas.

After a short time, however, he became dissatisfied with Kansas, and in 1856 he removed to Puget Sound again, returning to the employ of the Port Gamble mill, in his old position of superintendent. In 1862 he removed his family to Seattle, in order to improve the educational advantages of his children. He was one of the parents who served at times as a teacher.

At that time he purchased four lots on Fourth street, between Marion and Columbia, (currently 2009 the Rainier Club) and subsequently added two more lots, at an average price of $100 each. His was the first house erected on Fourth street. After thus providing a home for his family, he returned to mill work in various localities, at which he continued until 1878, when he retired from active labor and permanently settled in Seattle and began improving his property, which was now well covered with substantial houses for tenants.

In 1880, he bought 10 acres (40,000 m^{2}) of land at Edgewater, now part of Fremont in Lake Union addition, which he subdivided and sold for residence purposes, except four lots on time corner of Richard and Henry streets, upon which, in the summer of 1890, he erected a spacious residence, overlooking the lake, where he resided accompanied by his wife.

== Children ==
Two children were born to Mr. Burnett and wife, Charles Hiram Burnett Sr., who was superintendent of the South Prairie Coal Company at Burnett, Washington in Pierce County, Washington, and who was active in the coal development of Washington State. His daughter was Nellie Maria who was married to Stephen Pearl Andrews II, nephew of anarchist essayist Stephen Pearl Andrews. Nellie Maria Burnett's second husband was Stewart Hoskinson (together they were the great-grandparents of singer and actress Michelle Phillips).

== Public offices ==
Politically, Mr. Burnett was a staunch Republican. While at Port Gamble he served as Justice of the Peace, and for ten years as Probate Judge, and also served a term as Commissioner of King County, Washington. He was one of the activists behind the founding of the University of Washington and served as regent for a year.

== Religious activity ==
While employed by Puget Mill Company he spent periods of lesser activity at the mill in touring Puget Sound during which time he both prospected for business buying timber and cutting logs. He spent considerable time evangelizing to the Indians and distributing bibles and prayer books; in this he was active with Rev. Benjamin Wistar Morris. Mr. Burnett is the recognized father of Trinity Episcopal Parish Church of Seattle downtown which was founded in 1865, and the first church erected in 1869. He was one of time first Vestrymen, and served in that capacity and as Senior Warden up to 1889, when he withdrew to assist in time organization of St. Mark's Church, located where the family had moved in Fremont, Seattle in which he continued as Senior Warden for many years. While in the performance of mill work about the Sound he was always active in Sunday-school work, and did much pioneer work in that capacity, always exerting his influence on the side of morality and in the upbuilding of Christian institutions. He was first a layreader and ordained as a deacon.

Mr. Burnett stands in the relation to Seattle and the Sound country in the same manner as older citizens, such as Arthur A. Denny, Thomas Mercer, Henry Van Asselt, George F. Whitworth, John J. McGilvra, Orange Jacobs, and Dexter Horton. They are regarded as pioneers of the State of Washington.
