= Radiator Whiskey =

Restaurant in Seattle, Washington, U.S.

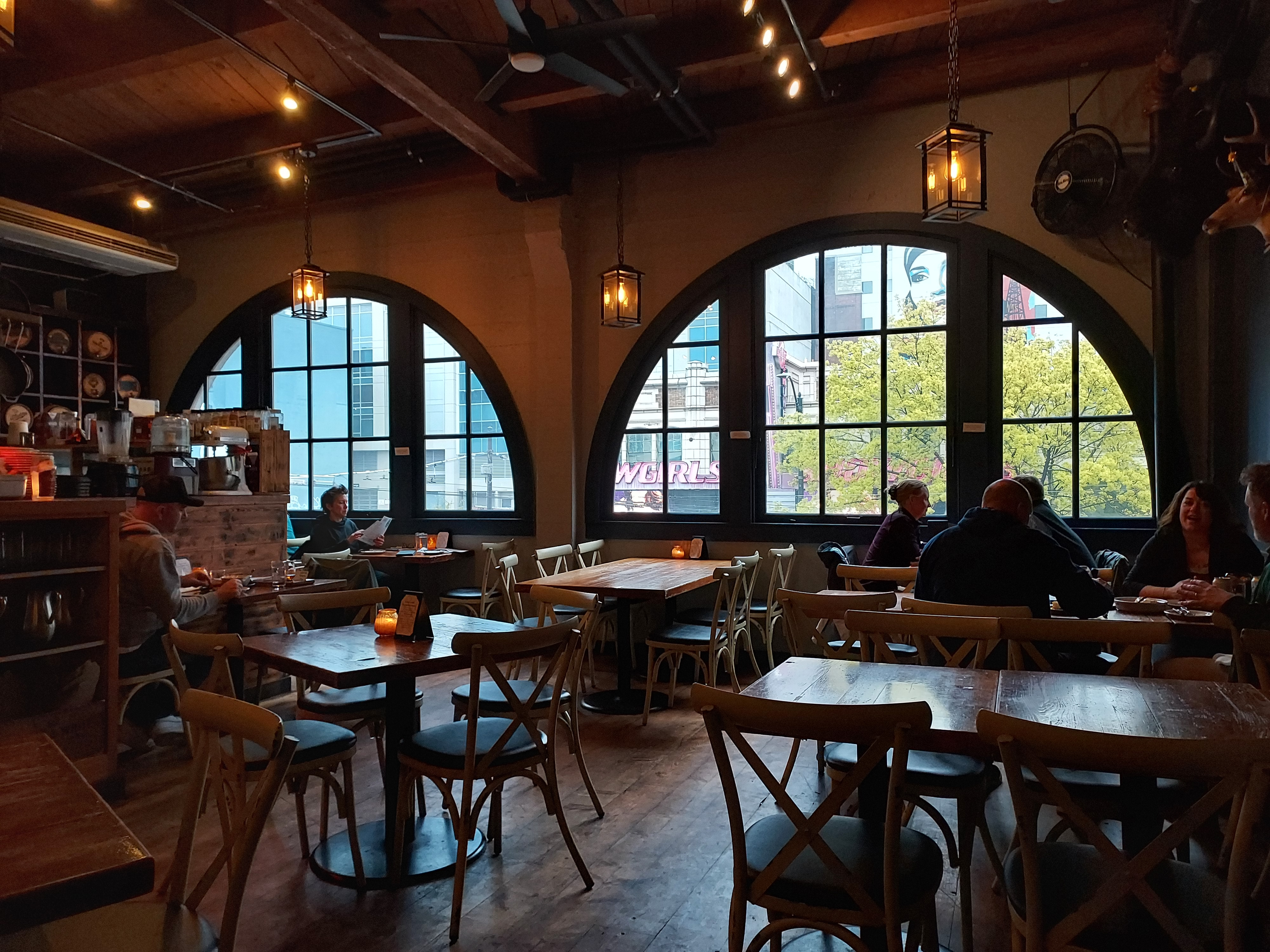
- The restaurant's interior, 2023
- Interactive map of Radiator Whiskey

Restaurant information
- Food type: American
- Location: Seattle, King, Washington, United States
- Coordinates: 47°36′32″N 122°20′25″W
- Website: radiatorwhiskey.com

Radiator Whiskey is a bar and restaurant in Seattle's Pike Place Market, in the U.S. state of Washington.

== Description ==
Radiator Whiskey operates in the top floor of the Corner Market building at Pike Place Market. It has an open kitchen and a rustic design. The interior has shelves with stacked dishwater and napkins. The American menu is written on a blackboard. The restaurant has served tater tots, pork cheek stew, pig's head, sandwiches, salads, vegetables, and whiskey.

== History ==
The restaurant opened in 2013. Charlie Garrison and Tyler Palagi are chefs.

== See also ==
- List of restaurants in Pike Place Market
