= Elizabeth Ordway =

Advocate for women's suffrage

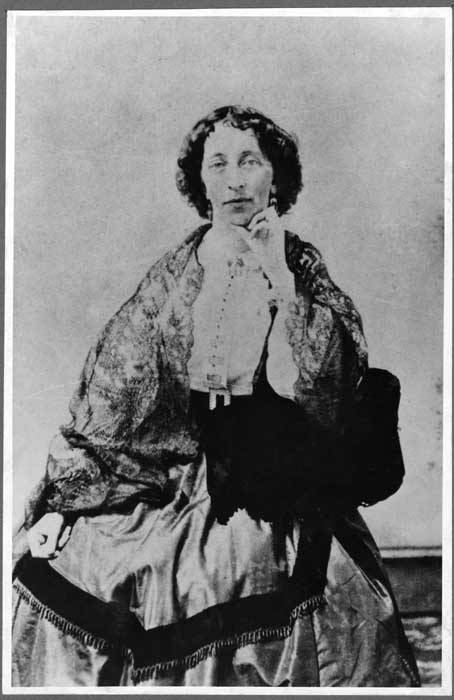
- Born: 4 July 1828
- Died: 11 September 1897 (aged 69); Seattle
- Resting place: Lake View Cemetery
- Other names: Lizzie
- Occupation: Teacher, suffragist

Mary Elizabeth Ordway (July 4, 1828 – September 11, 1897), an early advocate for women's suffrage in Washington territory, was one of the first group of young women recruited to become teachers and wives in pioneer Seattle in the 1860s. Despite the expectation that these "Mercer Girls" would marry, Ordway remained single and became a successful teacher, school administrator, and suffrage activist. The suffrage activism of Ordway and some of the other "Mercer Girls" reflected their educational levels, professional status, and the values associated with personal autonomy that promoted their decisions to migrate across the continent to build new lives.

== Early life ==
Ordway received a good education for a woman of her time, matriculating at the Ipswich Academy in Massachusetts. She taught in Lowell Massachusetts before migrating to Washington when she was in her mid-30s.

== Teaching ==
She taught first in schools on Whidbey Island and in the lumber communities of Port Gamble and Port Madison on the Kitsap Peninsula. She developed a reputation as the best teacher in the territory, according to author Libbie Hawker, and traveled around the area to turn around problem schools. She also launched and taught in Seattle's first dedicated school building.

== Suffrage and Public Service ==
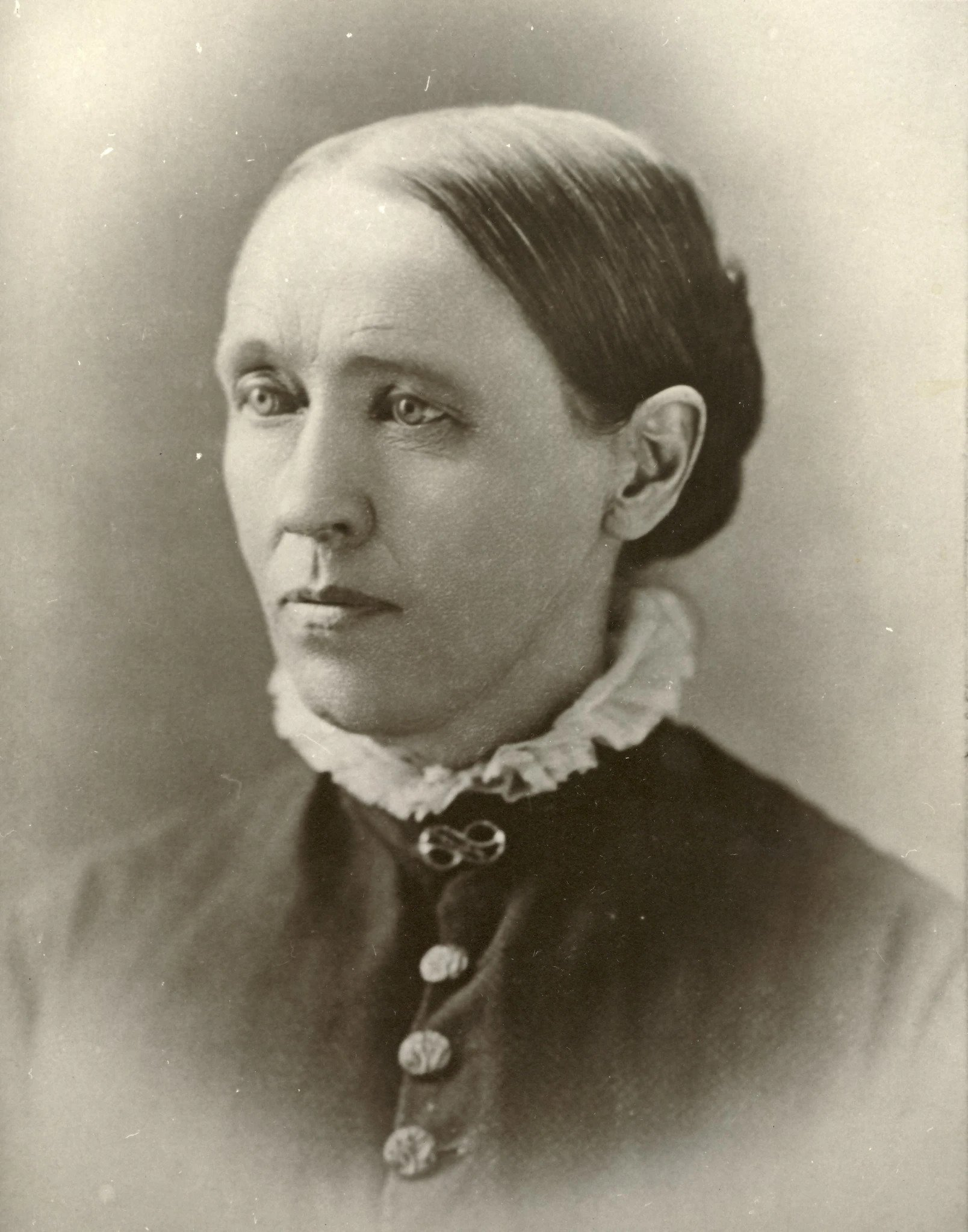
Elizabeth Ordway, c. 1880s

In 1871, Ordway appeared on stage with Susan B. Anthony in Seattle during Anthony's tour of the Northwest promoting the cause of women voting. Ordway became active in the Female Suffrage Association formed after Anthony spoke and served as a delegate to the territorial suffrage convention. Anthony formed the Washington Territory Woman Suffrage Association, a crucial vehicle for suffrage lobbying in the ensuing decades. Thereafter, Ordway returned to teaching in Kitsap County and, in 1881, became the first woman to be elected as a school superintendent in territorial Washington. She served Kitsap County in that position for eight years, solidifying her position as a builder of public schools in Washington territory.
