= Charles Hiram Burnett Sr. =

Charles Hiram Burnett (1847 – January 9, 1916) was an American politician and commission merchant who was the first Treasurer of the City of Seattle 1869–1872, and the General Superintendent of various coal mines in King and Pierce Counties on Puget Sound in the state of Washington.

== Family ==
Burnett was the son of Hiram Burnett and Elizabeth Merriam Gibbs Burnett of Seattle, Washington. He married Georgia Campbell McLean and they had two children, Amy Louise and Charles Hiram Jr. When his wife died young he continued living with his mother-in-law Georgia McLean for almost forty years until her death.

His son Charles H. Burnett Jr. was a Seattle City Councilor, President of the Seattle City Council and Acting Mayor of Seattle. Burnett officiated at the grand opening of Pike Place Market with fellow City Councilor Thomas P. Revelle.

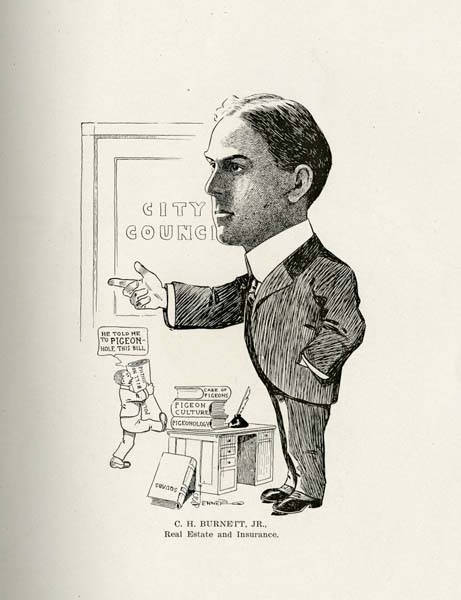
A political cartoon depicting Charles Hiram Burnett Jr. as Seattle City Councilman

Charles Hiram Burnett Jr. was born in 1875 in Seattle, Washington. He was the son of Charles Hiram Burnett Sr and Georgia McLean. Georgia died when Charles Hiram Burnett Jr and his sister Amy Louise Burnett Bond were children. Amy was raised during high-school as a ward in the household of Howard Cranston Potter and Alice Kershaw Potter. The Potters' daughter Bertha Potter Paschall Boeing was the wife of William Boeing. Charles Hiram Burnett Jr. was active in Puget Sound real estate and insurance businesses. Charles H. Burnett Jr. was also active in the Washington poultry and egg industry as a breeder, agricultural fair judge and lobbyist.

The family were involved with development of made land created by the lowering of the surface of Lake Washington in 1916. Charles Burnett Jr.'s wife was Mary Florence Goodfellow of Seattle, and Wenatchee, Washington. Three of Mary's brothers, John, James, and George Goodfellow founded the West Coast and Hawaii construction firm Goodfellow Brothers. Charles Burnett Jr. moved to Maui, Hawaii about 1935 with his wife to be near their son. They lived at Haiku Plantation Haiku-Pauwela, Hawaii, and owned Haiku Poultry Farm. Charles Hiram Burnett Jr. died in 1941, and his wife Mary died in 1962.

Their son Charles H. "Buster" Burnett III (1902-1967) moved to Maui where he worked for Alexander & Baldwin in a series of management jobs and eventually became manager of Pu'unene Sugarmill in Puʻunene, Hawaii in 1962.

== Business ==
In April 1867 Hiram Burnett published a legal notice in the newspaper that his minor son Charles Hiram Burnett was free to go into business with S. B. Hinds. He was in partnership first with Hinds then after their firm merged with Corliss P. Stone he was a junior partner in Hinds, Stone & Co.. When Hinds left the firm became Stone, Burnett. They developed real estate, built a pier with warehouses and they sold wagons and carriages. They were the first merchants to use the Pike Street coal bunker to stock and ship Washington coal. Charles Hiram Burnett managed Seattle's first commercial delivery service. Charles Hiram Burnett met his wife because father in law Charles Edward McLean operated a Puget Sound delivery boat. In 1873 his partner Corliss P, Stone then also Mayor of Seattle unilaterally removed the liquid funds from their partnership turned full ownership over to Burnett and then temporarily absconded.

Charles Hiram Burnett was put in charge of the sale of shares, house lots and coal for the Renton Coal mines of Renton, Washington. Among the other executives involved with Burnett in Renton Coal and other subsequent coal mines were Charles B. Shattuck and Erasmus M. Smithers. Subsequently, Charles Hiram Burnett spent time managing operations at several other Washington locations. He was the founder of the village of Burnett, Washington and the first owner of part of the land created by the lowering of Lake Washington that is now the Boeing Renton Factory in Renton, Washington. He died at the Savoy Hotel in Seattle on January 9, 1916. In the city of Renton, Charles Burnett has an avenue, a park and a train station named after him.

While Charles Hiram Burnett's daughter Amy was in finishing school in Tacoma she lived as a ward with her father's friends Mr. Howard Cranston Potter Jr. and Alice Kershaw Potter the parents of Bertha Potter Boeing (Mrs. William Boeing). Howard Cranston Potter was member of a family prominent in the New York Episcopal clergy. Potter was also a descendant through his mother of merchant bankers Alexander Brown of Baltimore founder of the firm Alex Brown, his grandfather was James Brown of Brown Bros. & Co. and his father was Brown's son-in-law and partner philanthropist Howard Potter of New York. Alice Kershaw Potter was the daughter of Milwaukee grain and lumber merchant Charles James Kershaw.

Amy Louise Burnett became the wife of Marshall Latham Bond and Charles Hiram Burnett Jr. was a Seattle City Councilor, Council President and Acting Mayor of Seattle. Charles Hiram Burnett Jr.'s wife was Mary Florence "Mae" Goodfellow. Mae Goodfellow Burnett's brothers founded Goodfellow Brothers of Wenatchee, Washington.

== Sources ==
- Seattle City Treasurers
- HistoryLink Essay: Voters elect Corliss P. Stone as mayor of the City of Seattle on July 8, 1872
- HistoryLink Essay: Seattle Mayor Corliss P. Stone embezzles $15,000 and runs on February 23, 1873
- "Renton, Where the Water Took Wing" by Buerge
- Historical Quarterly 19.p65
