= Three Girls Bakery =

Bakery in Seattle, Washington, U.S.

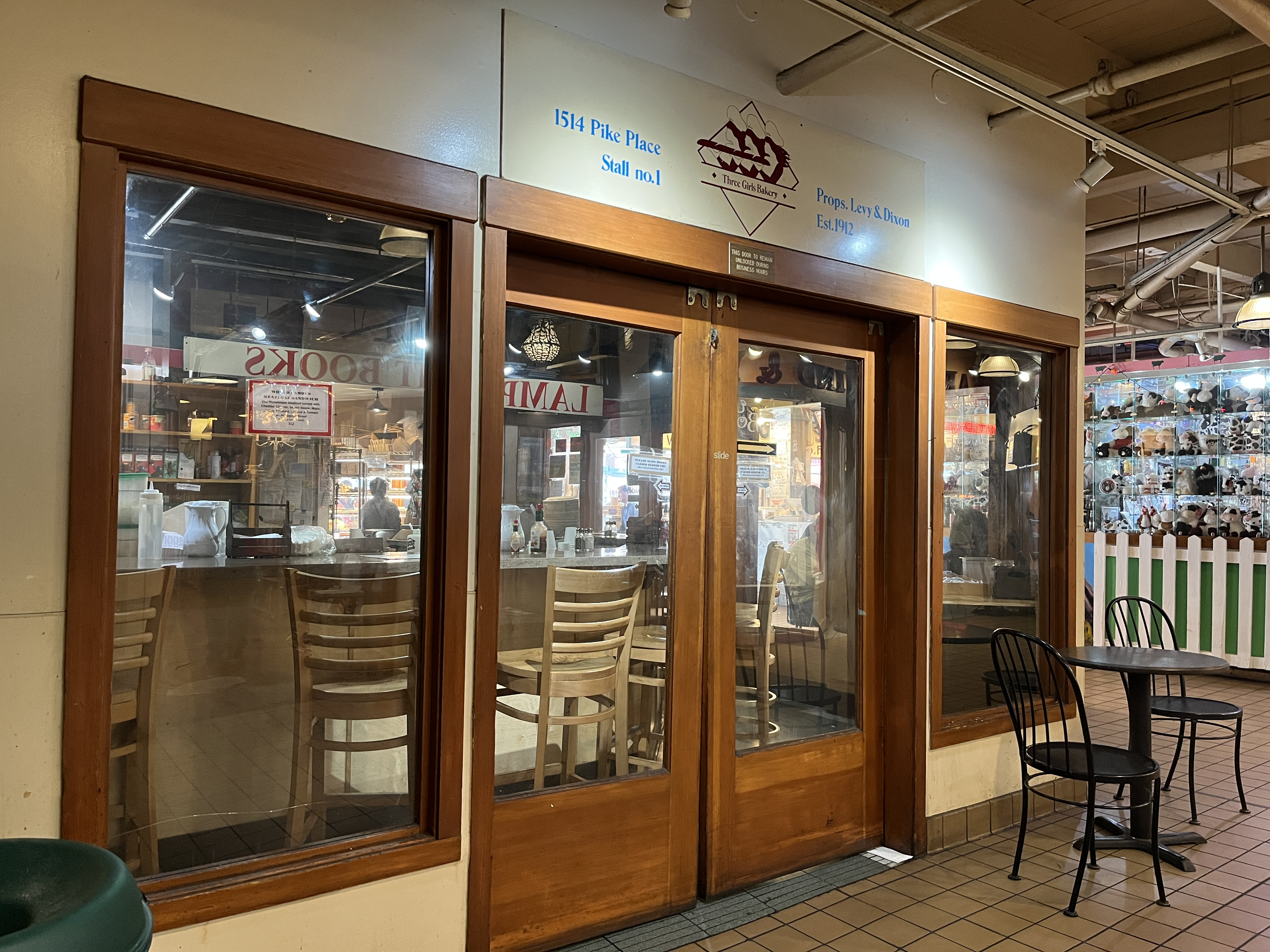
- Interior counter, 2022
- Interactive map of Three Girls Bakery

Restaurant information
- Established: 1912
- Location: 1514 Pike Place, Seattle, King, Washington, 98101, United States
- Coordinates: 47.6090°N 122.3409°W
- Website: threegirlsbakery.com

Three Girls Bakery is a bakery at Seattle's Pike Place Market, in the U.S. state of Washington. The business was founded by three women in 1912.

== Description ==
Three Girls Bakery is a bakery in the Sanitary Market building at Pike Place Market in Central Waterfront, Seattle. Seattle Metropolitan says, "Fat sandwiches cradled by Three Girls Bakery fresh baked bread and a variety of hot soups draw everyone from tourists to gnarled locals at this Pike Place Market staple." Eater Seattle has said, "This small, family-owned Pike Place Market business has been around for decades, serving loaves of sourdough, multigrain, and other types of bread, as well as a selection of sweeter items. The window is usually open until 6 p.m. daily, or until the bread sells out."

The menu has also included brownies, cakes, macaroons, muffins, pastries (including rugelach), scones, and coffee. Baked goods are displayed at a to-go window and a lunch counter serves sandwiches and soups; one special has marinated eggplant, hummus, onion, sprouts, tomato, and provolone on a sourdough baguette. The Meatloaf Sandwich has meatloaf, onions, mayonnaise, mustard, and barbecue sauce.

== History ==
Three Girls Bakery was founded by three women in 1912, becoming the first woman-owned business in Seattle.

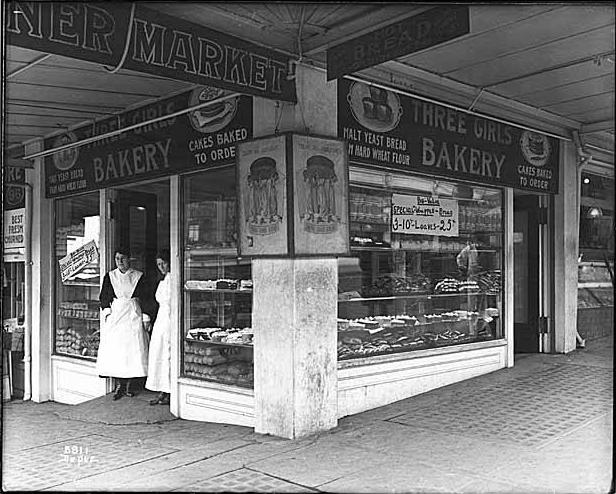
The bakery in 1917

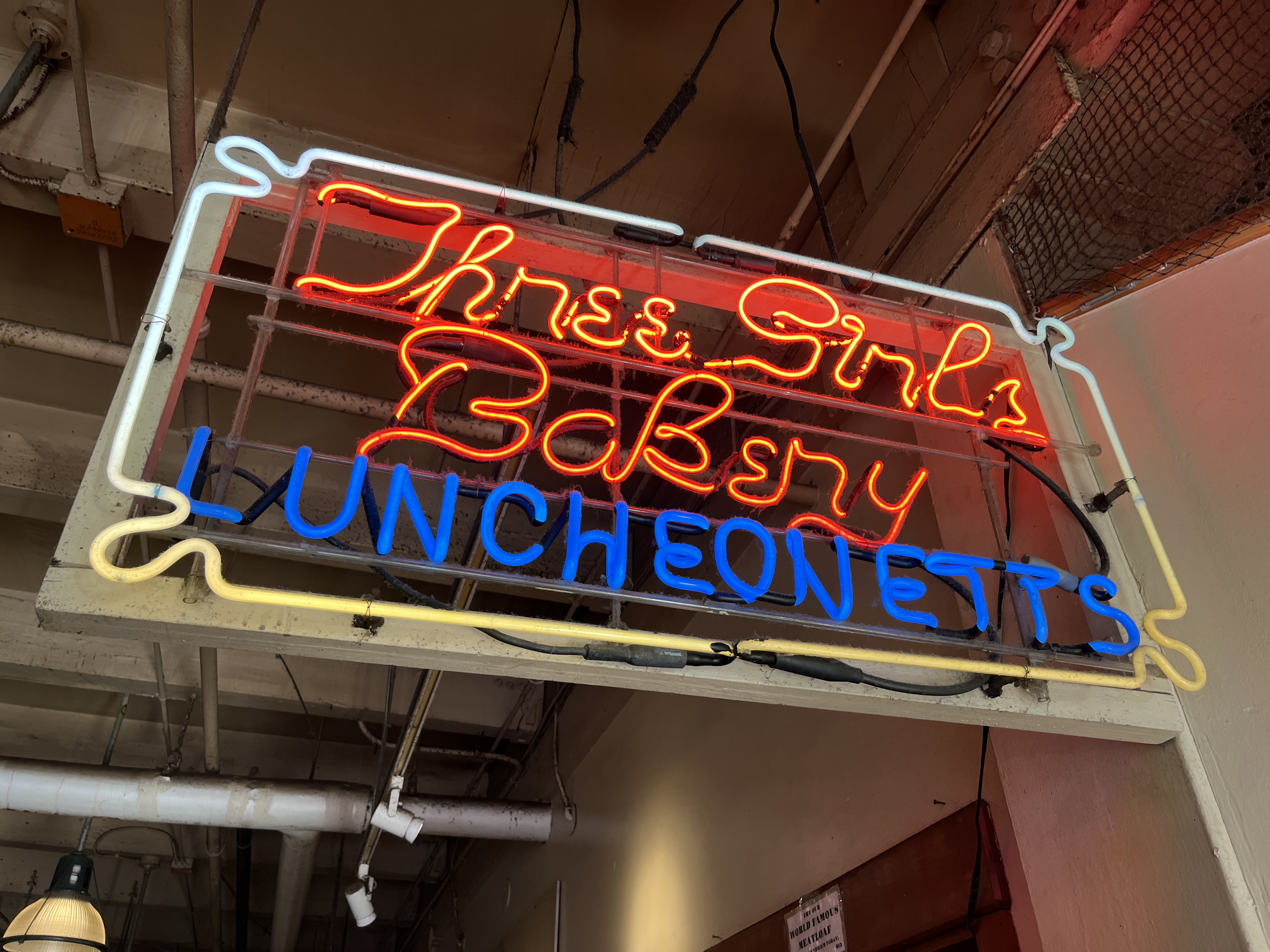
Sign for the lunch counter, 2022

== Reception ==
Jen Vafidis included the Meatloaf Sandwich in Men's Journal's 2015 list of "The 50 Best Sandwiches in America".

== See also ==
- List of bakeries
- List of restaurants in Pike Place Market
