= Jack's Fish Spot =

Fish market and restaurant in Seattle, Washington, U.S.

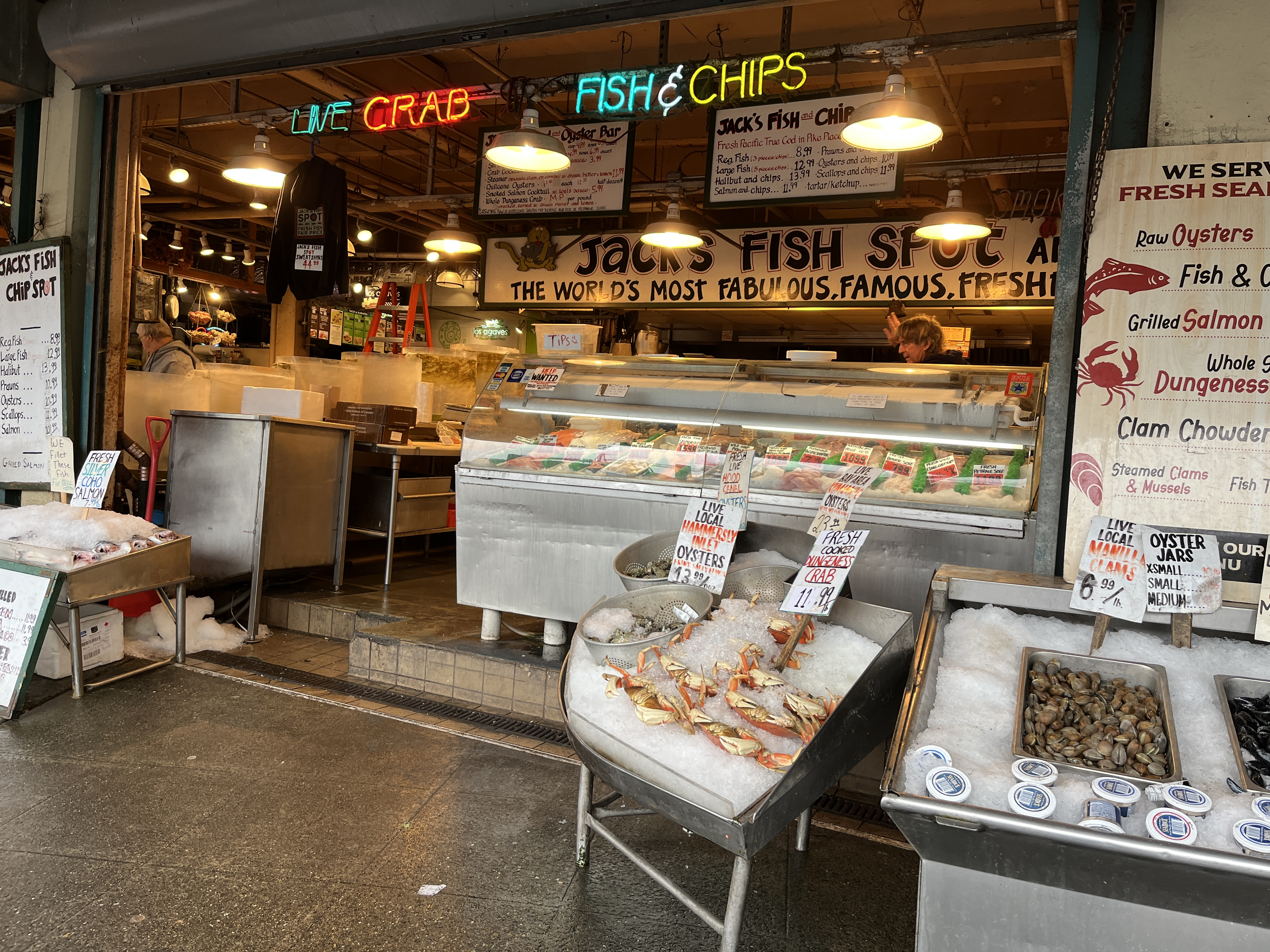
- The market in 2008
- Interactive map of Jack's Fish Spot

Restaurant information
- Food type: Seafood
- Location: 1514 Pike Place, Seattle, King, Washington, 98101, United States
- Coordinates: 47.6091°N 122.34087°W

Jack's Fish Spot is a fish market and seafood bar at Seattle's Pike Place Market, in the U.S. state of Washington.

== Description ==
The fish market and seafood bar Jack's Fish Spot operates in Pike Place Market's Sanitary Market building, in the Central Waterfront district of Seattle. The business has stocked dungeness crab, manila clams, flounder, mussels, sockeye and king salmon, and oysters. The counter's menu has included fish and chips, cioppino, New England–style clam chowder, halibut, fried salmon, fish tacos, and whole steamed crab. Thrillist says, "It's a great spot to post up, slurp some oysters (heck, you can even watch their journey from the ice display case out front, to the shucking counter, and to your plate), or feast on some delicious fish and chips."

== History ==
Jack's Fish Spot was established in 1982. Former commercial fisherman Jack Mathers owns the business.

== Reception ==
Seattle Metropolitan has said, "The stools, if you can get one at all, are cracked and worn. The last diner likely didn't bother to clean his crumbs off the tiny metal counter. View this well-loved Pike Place Market joint as a greasy spoon that serves pristine seafood ... and you'll find its true charms." Jenny Kuglin included the business in Seattle Refined's 2014 list of "5 of Seattle's tastiest oyster bars". In 2015, Tobias Coughlin-Bogue of The Stranger wrote:

I like Jack's Fish Spot because, despite its polished website, it's still the crustiest of the market's three fish vendors... The fried fish is fresh as hell and the batter is kept simple, allowing the fish to shine. My one complaint: The last time I tried it, the tartar sauce was made by Kraft, which tasted like seasoned glue. Better to just douse everything in malt vinegar.

Naomi Tomky included the raw oysters in Thrillist's 2016 list of "The 50 Best Things to Eat and Drink at Pike Place Market". In Eater Seattle's 2019 overview of "The Greatest Places to Eat in Seattle's Greatest Tourist Trap", Lesley Balla wrote, "For traditional New England–style clam chowder, Jack's Fish Spot ... is the move: It's richer, thicker, and more peppery than others, with a big bread bowl that makes a nice prelude to crispy fish and chips there." Chelsea Lin and Tomky included the cioppino in Seattle Magazine's 2020 list of "The 100 Best Things to Eat in the Seattle Area Right Now: Seafood Edition".

== See also ==
- List of restaurants in Pike Place Market
- List of seafood restaurants
