= Café Hagen =

Chain of bakeries and coffee shops in Seattle, Washington, U.S.

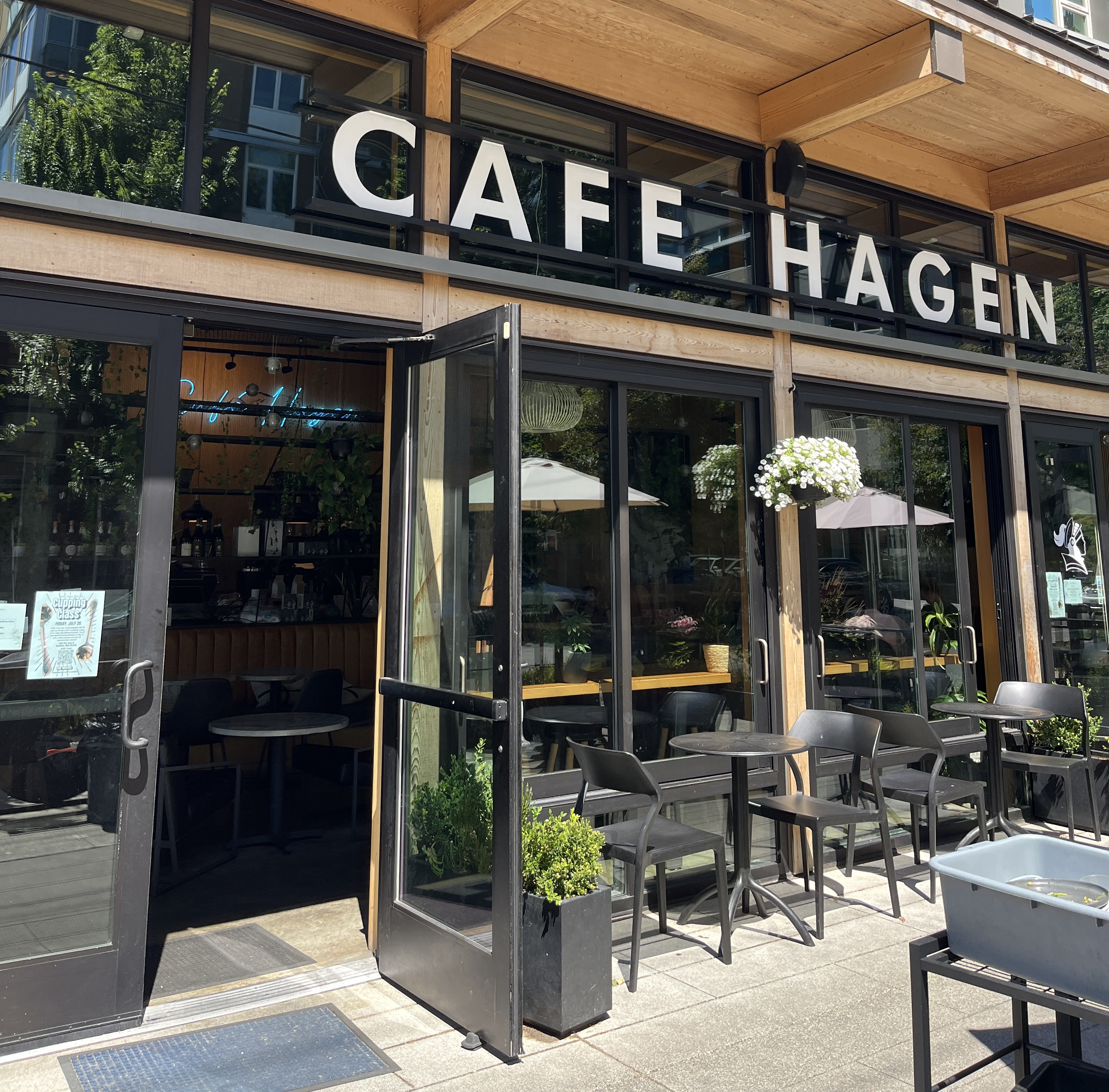
- Exterior of a location in South Lake Union, Seattle, 2024
- Interactive map of Café Hagen

Restaurant information
- Established: December 2019
- Owner: Maria Beck
- Food type: Scandinavian
- Location: 1252 Thomas Street, Seattle, King, Washington, 98109, United States
- Coordinates: 47.6210°N 122.3314°W
- Website: cafehagen.com

Café Hagen is a small chain of Scandinavian bakeries and coffee shops in Seattle, in the U.S. state of Washington. Founded by owner Maria Beck in December 2019, the business has operated in South Lake Union, downtown Seattle, and Queen Anne. Café Hagen has an associated coffee brand known as Hagen Coffee Roasters, which has competed in the United States Barista Championship and other coffee competitions.

== Description ==
Café Hagen is a small chain of Scandinavian and Danish-inspired bakeries and coffee shops in Seattle. The business operates in the city's South Lake Union, downtown, and Queen Anne neighborhoods. It is affiliated with the brand Hagen Coffee Roasters (HCR), which is also owned by the founder of Café Hagen. Café Hagen's logo depicts a female warrior.

The South Lake Union location has an astroturf patio and the interior has many faux plants, leather furniture, marble countertops, and hardwood floors and accents. The cafe has many windows allowing natural light, a minimalist design with colors and materials inspired by nature, and a simple menu. One wall has large black-and-white photographs of women wearing "intricate" custom made armor. The cafe uses cutlery and tableware from Denmark, as well as hand-painted mugs.

=== Menu ===
Café Hagen serves breakfast and lunch, as well as weekend brunch. The menu includes lavender oat milk lattes and other espresso drinks, as well as beer and wine. Select drinks use caramel and chocolate sauce made in-house, and the earl grey tea concentrate for the London fog is made by Chi Chai, another business belonging to the owner of Café Hagen. The Mocha Flight has shot of espresso, steamed milk, a caffè mocha, and a bar of chocolate by Seattle-based Theo Chocolate.

Food options include an avocado bowl, breakfast sandwiches, yogurt bowls, salmon toasts (with cured salmon, Danish goat cheese, fennel, and dill), breads, Danish cinnamon rolls, and other pastries. The avocado bowl has avocado, arugula, dried cranberry, goat cheese, prosciutto, soft-boiled egg, and tomatoes.

The signature Café Hagen brunch option includes a Danish waffle with jam and whipped cream, cheese, avocado, bread and butter, scrambled eggs, and a choice of bacon, mushrooms, or sausage. Lunch options include salads with organic produce as well as sandwiches.

== History and reception ==
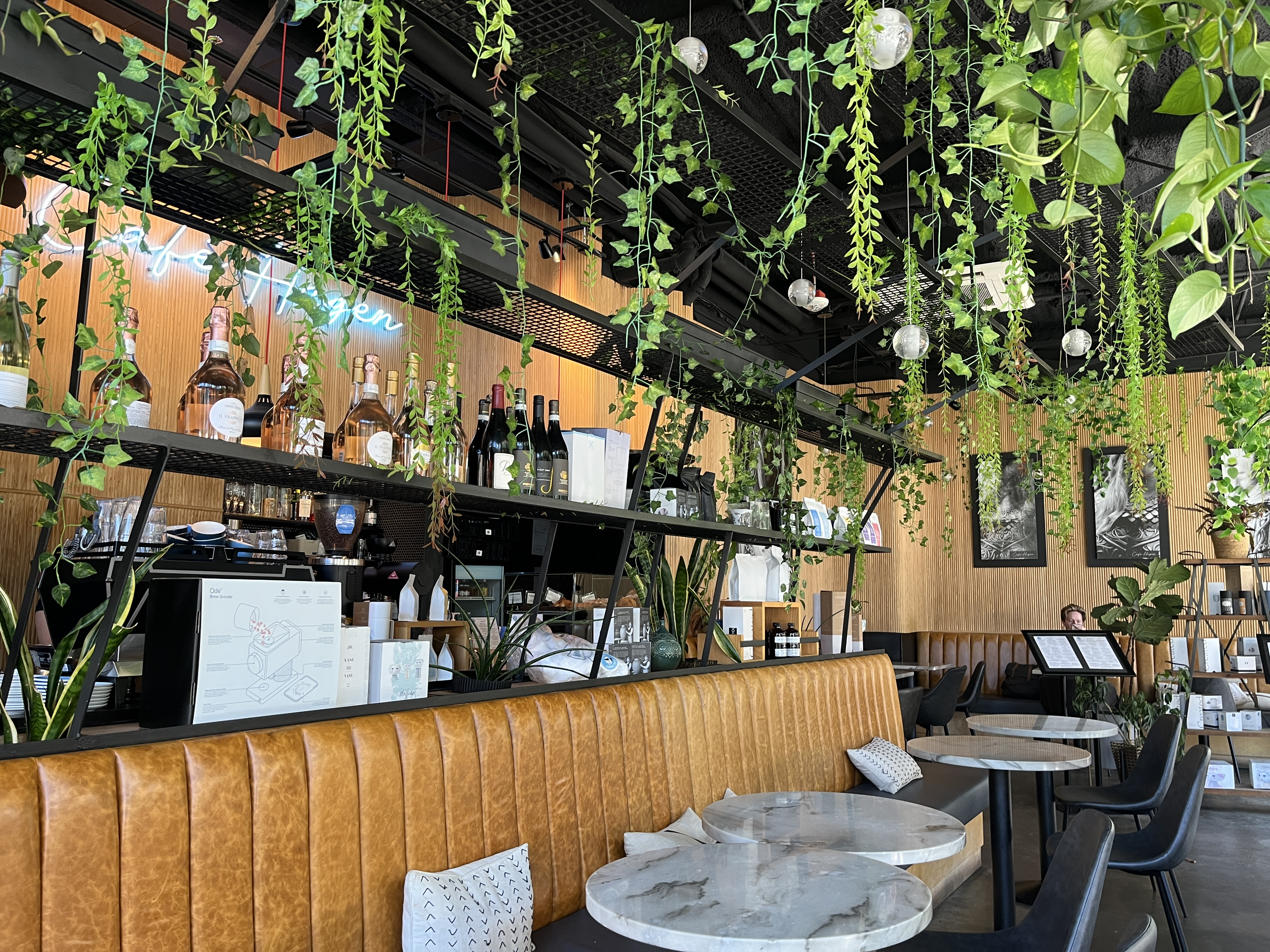
Interior of the South Lake Union location in 2024

Café Hagen was established in December 2019. Maria Beck is the founder and owner. She is originally from Denmark, and the restaurant's name is an homage to the city of Copenhagen. Café Hagen's third location opened in Queen Anne in 2022, in a space that previously housed a Storyville Coffee shop. Café Hagen focuses on light roasts and has sourced coffee from Cafe Imports, Keffa Coffee, and Red Fox Coffee Merchants.

HCR, which Beck founded in 2018, sources coffee from two women-owned farms in Costa Rica and Honduras. HCR has competed in the U.S. Barista Championship (2019, 2024), among other coffee competitions. For the 2024 barista competition, Noel Goodwin used a Yellow Bourbon variety of coffee grown in Colombia. Beck also owns the Ballard coffee shop Venture Coffee Co. (rebranded from Java Bean), which has been described as a sibling company to HCR. She also owns Freya Bakery & Cafe, a Scandinavian bakery at Pike Place Market that makes breads, cakes, and other baked goods for Beck's restaurants, including Café Hagen.

In a 2020 review for The Seattle Times, Jackie Varriano said of Café Hagen's South Lake Union location: "I can vouch that the vibe is comfortable, yet fierce, with a good amount of inviting European chic thrown into the mix." Aimee Rizzo included Café Hagen in The Infatuation's 2023 list of Seattle's best cafes for getting work done.

== See also ==
- Hygge
- List of bakeries
- List of coffeehouse chains
- List of restaurant chains in the United States
- List of Scandinavian restaurants
