= The Crumpet Shop =

Restaurant in Seattle, Washington, U.S.

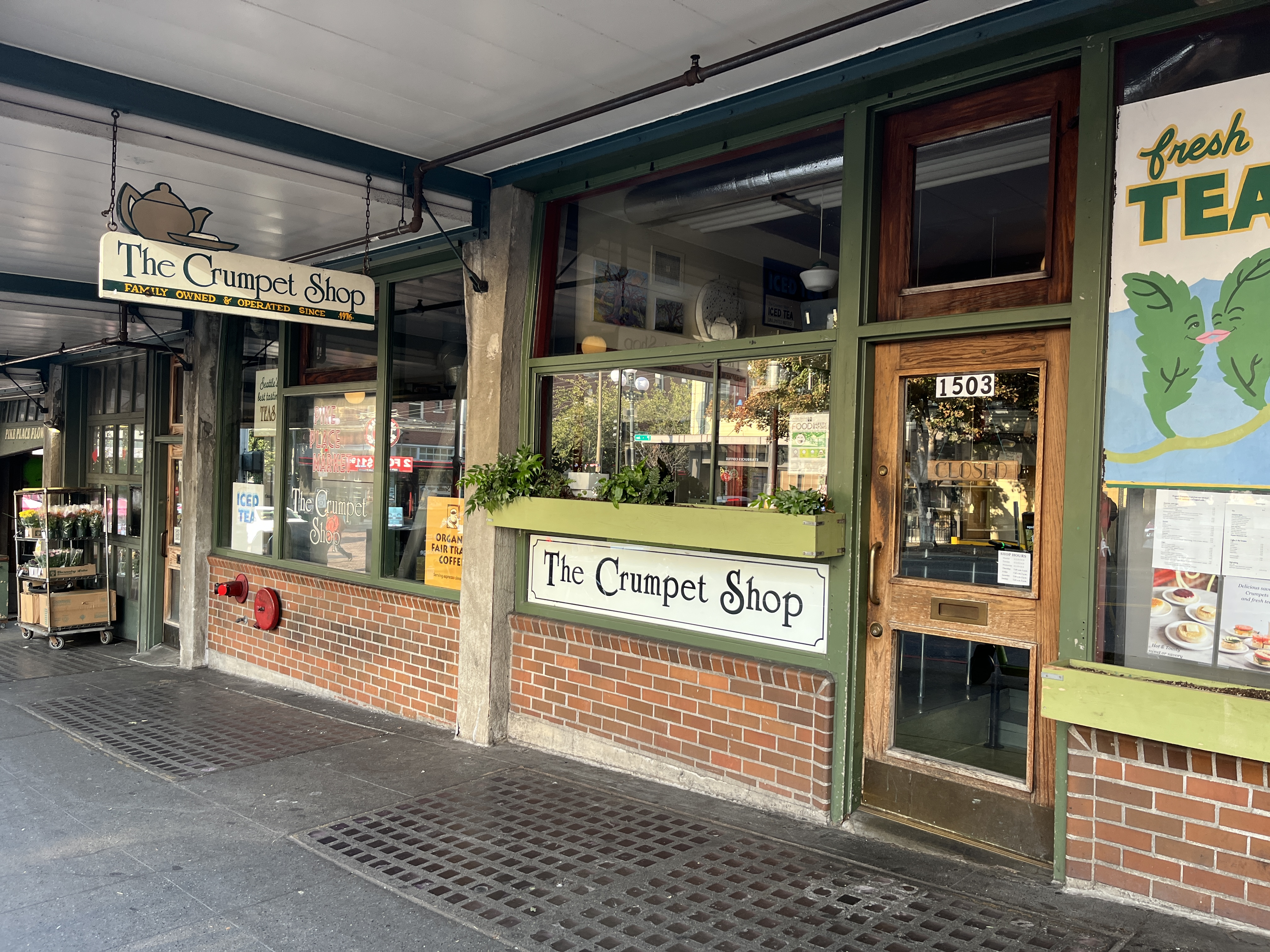
- The shop's exterior, 2022
- Interactive map of The Crumpet Shop

Restaurant information
- Established: 1976
- Owners: Amy and Cooper Golding
- Previous owners: Gary Lasater and Nancy McFaul
- Location: Seattle, Washington, United States
- Coordinates: 47.6090°N 122.3405°W

The Crumpet Shop is a bakery and pastry shop in Seattle's Pike Place Market, in the U.S. state of Washington.

== Description ==
Located at the intersection of First and Pike Place, in the Corner Market building, The Crumpet Shop serves sweet and savory crumpets with various toppings such as butter, English cheese, honey, ricotta, and walnuts. The restaurant has a version with ham, egg, and cheese, and the "Seattle-style" variety has cucumber and smoked salmon. The Green Eggs and Ham has pesto.

== History ==
Gary Lasater and Nancy McFaul opened the shop in 1976.

Amy and Cooper Golding are the current owners.

== Reception ==
In 1991, Jane and Michael Stern described the shop as "a special treasure". In 2007, Corby Kummer of The Atlantic said the business "makes the most authentic and best scone I know in the country".

Lara Douglass included The Crumpet Shop's ham, egg and cheese crumpet in Eater Seattle's 2016 list of "Outstanding Egg Sandwiches in Seattle". The website's Meg van Huygen included the business in a 2019 list of "10 Seattle Tourist Trap Restaurants That Are Actually Good". The Crumpet Shop was also included in Eater Seattle's 2021 list of "Breakfast Sandwiches in Seattle Worth Waking Up Early to Get", and Jade Yamazaki Stewart included the business in a 2022 list of "20 Great Restaurants Near Pike Place Market".

== See also ==
- List of bakeries
- List of restaurants in Pike Place Market
