= Storyville Coffee =

American coffee company

Coordinates: 47.6088°N 122.3405°W

- Logo

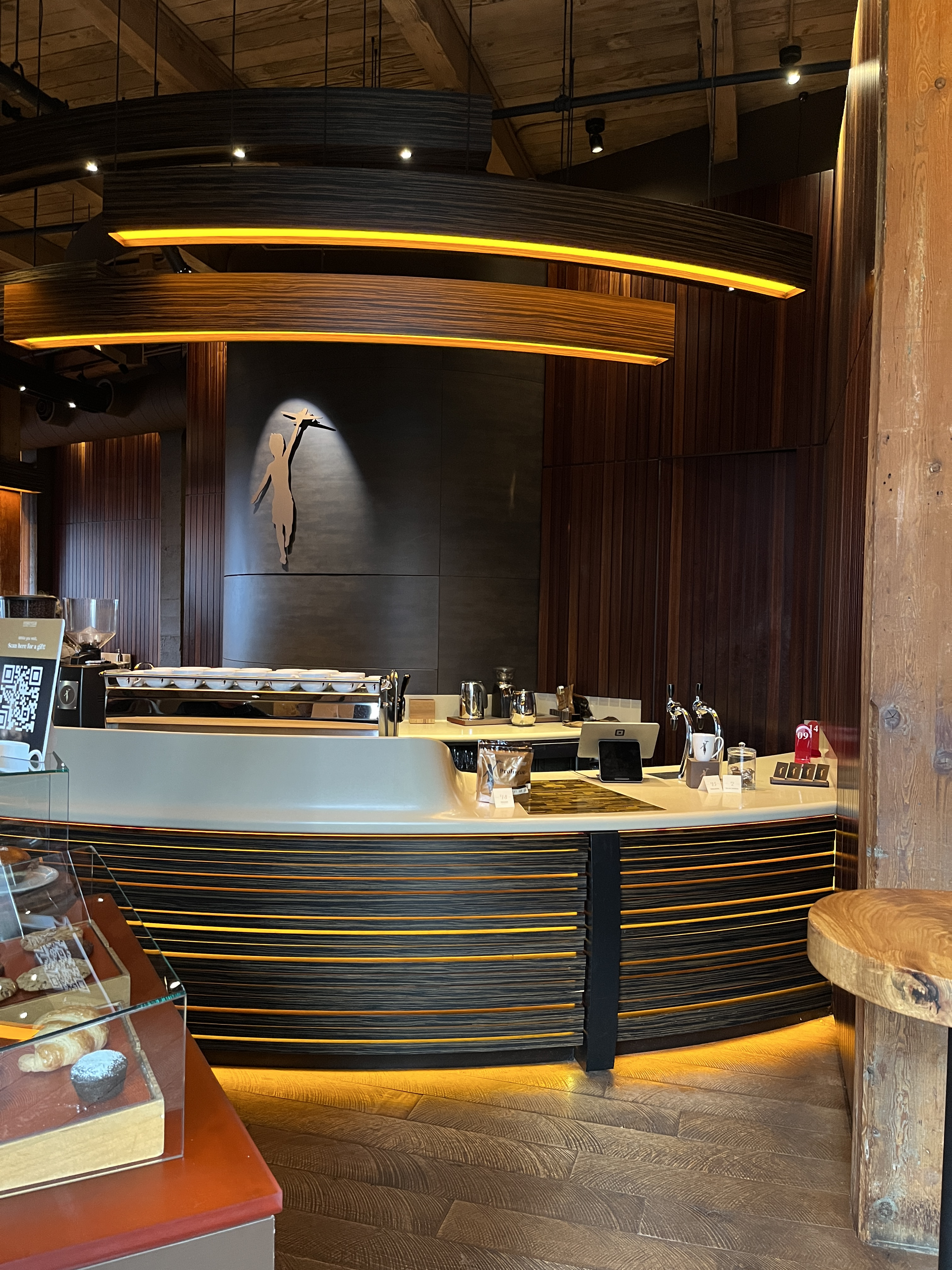
- Interior of the coffee shop in the Corner Market at Pike Place Market, 2022
- Industry: Coffee
- Website: storyville.com

Storyville Coffee (sometimes Storyville Coffee Company or simply Storyville) is a coffee company operating in the Seattle metropolitan area, in the U.S. state of Washington.

== Description ==
Storyville Coffee operates multiple coffee shops in the Seattle metropolitan area. The Seattle Times has described Storyville as a "roaster and mail-order coffee company". Bainbridge Island houses their Roasting Studio; the business also has shops in downtown Seattle with their flagship location being in the Corner Market building at Pike Place Market. In addition to coffee, the shops serve sandwiches and baked goods.

== History ==
Storyville was established on Bainbridge Island in 2006. The company announced plans to operate at Pike Place Market in 2013, occupying the space which previously housed Chez Shea. The business Storyville's third coffee shop opened in Queen Anne in 2014. The Queen Anne location has since closed and was replaced by Café Hagen.

During 2013–2014, a writer for The Stranger asked readers not to support the company because of the author's claim of a connection to the Mars Hill Church.

Employees filed a petition to unionize in 2022.

== Reception ==
Cheyenne Buckingham selected Storyville for Washington in Eat This, Not That's 2019 overview of the best coffee shops in each U.S. state. Insider's Caroline Fox and Gabbi Shaw named Storyville Coffee the coziest coffee shop in Washington. USA Today named Storyville Coffee a top ten roaster in the U.S.

== See also ==
- List of coffeehouse chains
- List of restaurants in Pike Place Market
