= El Mercado Latino =

Grocery store in Seattle, Washington, U.S.

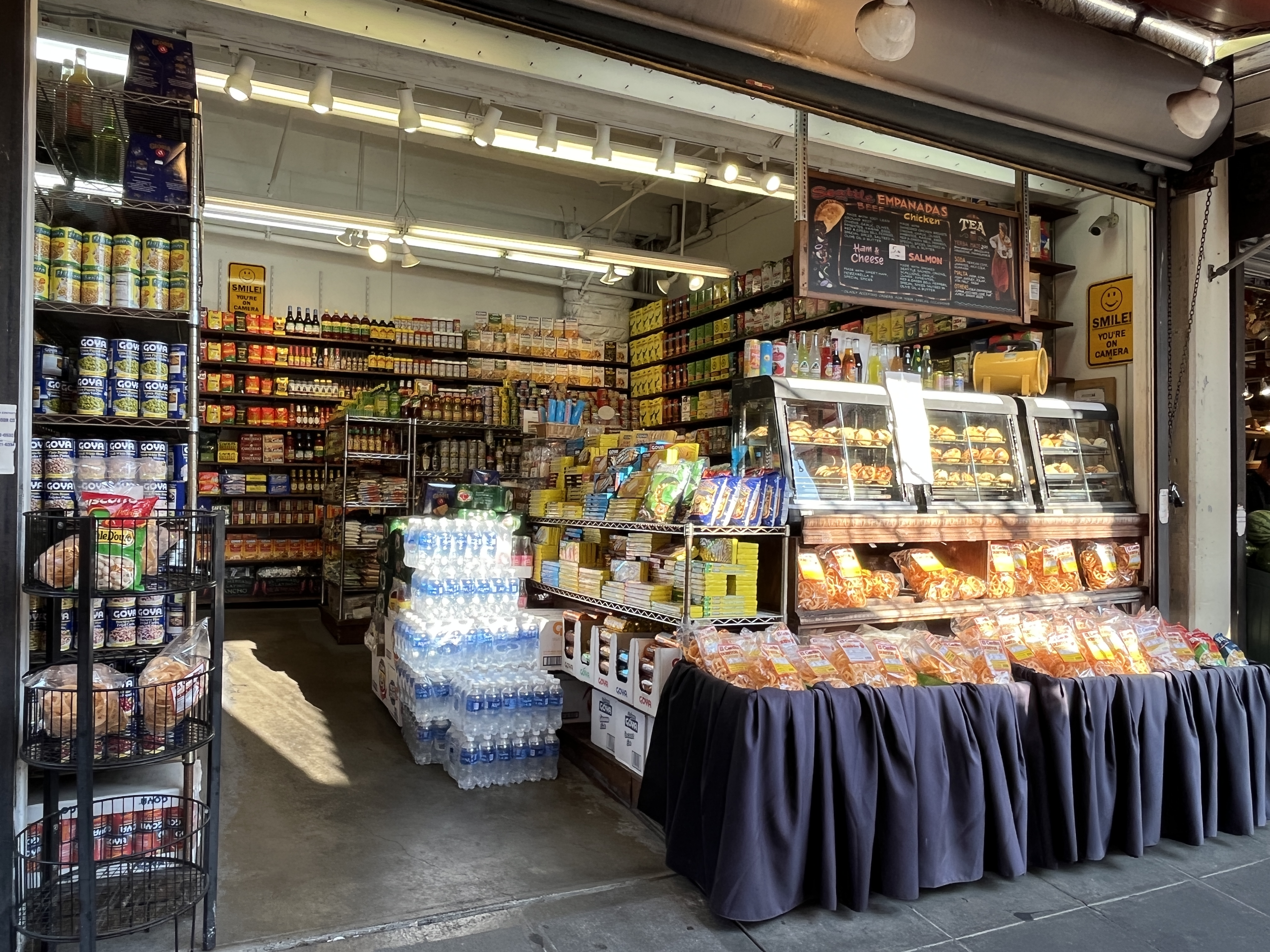
- The shop in 2022
- Interactive map of El Mercado Latino

Restaurant information
- Location: 1514 Pike Place, Unit 6, Seattle, King, Washington, 98101, United States
- Coordinates: 47.6091°N 122.3410°W

El Mercado Latino is a grocery and specialty store at Seattle's Pike Place Market, in the U.S. state of Washington.

== Description ==
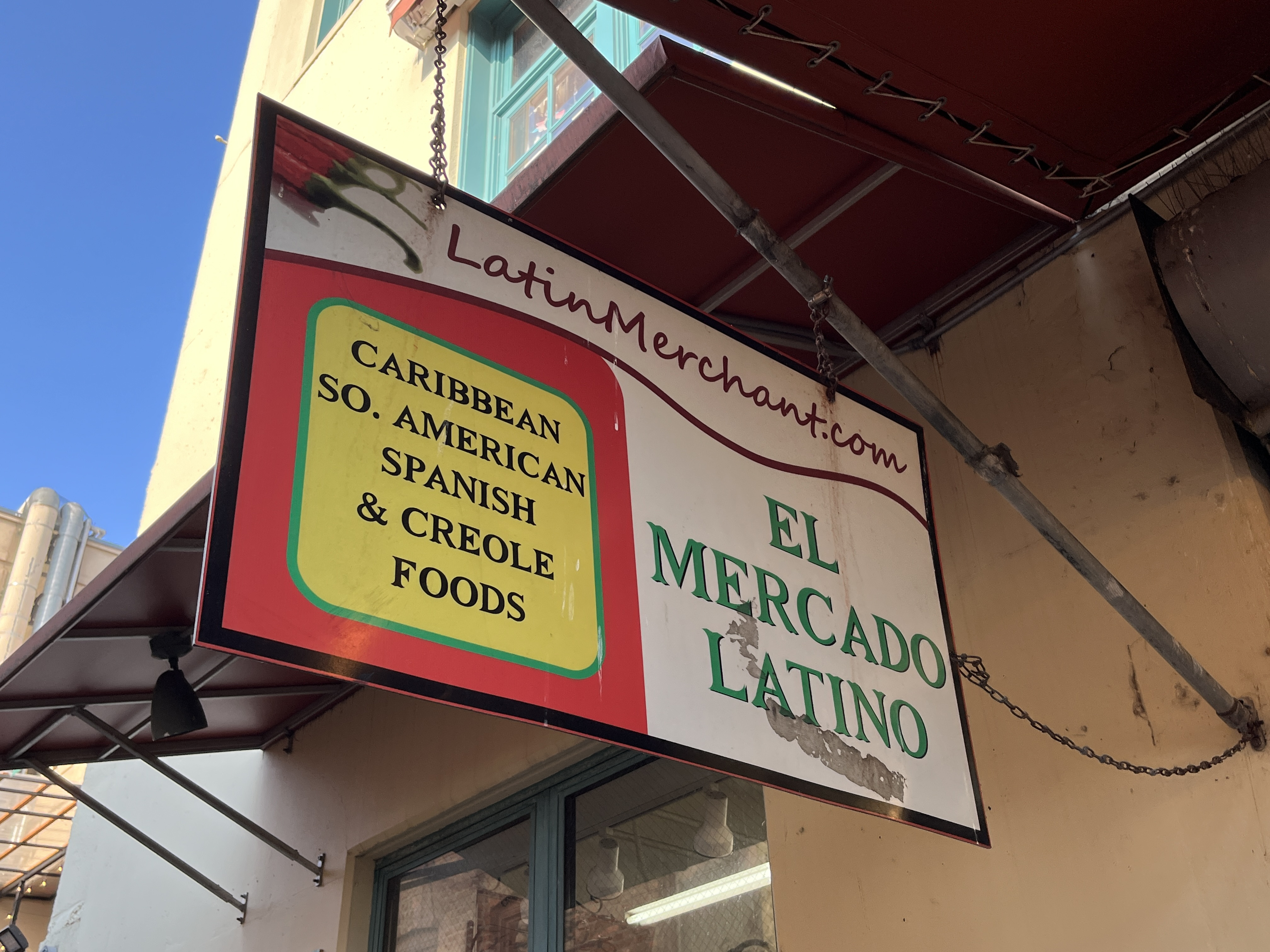
Sign for the business, 2022

El Mercado Latino is a female-owned grocery and specialty store on Post Alley in Pike Place Market's Sanitary Market building, in Seattle's Central Waterfront district. Seattle Best Places (1996) says, "The front of this diminutive store ... boasts a green grocery stocked with vegetables and fruits used in Caribbean, South American, Spanish Creole, and Thai cuisines."

The business sells Latin American foods and related products such as chili peppers, corn flour, dulce de leche, hot sauces, guava and passion fruit concentrates, Kaffir lime leaves, Lizano sauce, Mexican candies, Spanish saffron, and other spices. El Mercado Latino has also stocked canned goods, habaneros, Inca Kola, masa, tortillas, and other Mexican products. The shop serves empanadas on-site.

== History ==
Established in 1988, El Mercado Latino has been described as "one of Seattle's oldest Mexican grocery stores".

== Reception ==
In 2006, Neal Schindler of Seattle Weekly called El Mercado Latino a "hot-climate haven". The business topped Clive Irving's list of favorite Seattle shops for Condé Nast Traveler in 2011. In 2014, Thrillist's Chona Kasinger said the store "slings some of the city's best empanadas". Steven Hsieh included the business in The Stranger's 2017 "guide to Seattle for international students".
