= Frank's Quality Produce =

Shop at Pike Place Market in Seattle, Washington, U.S.

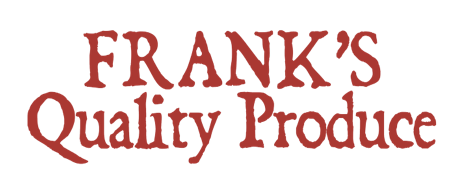

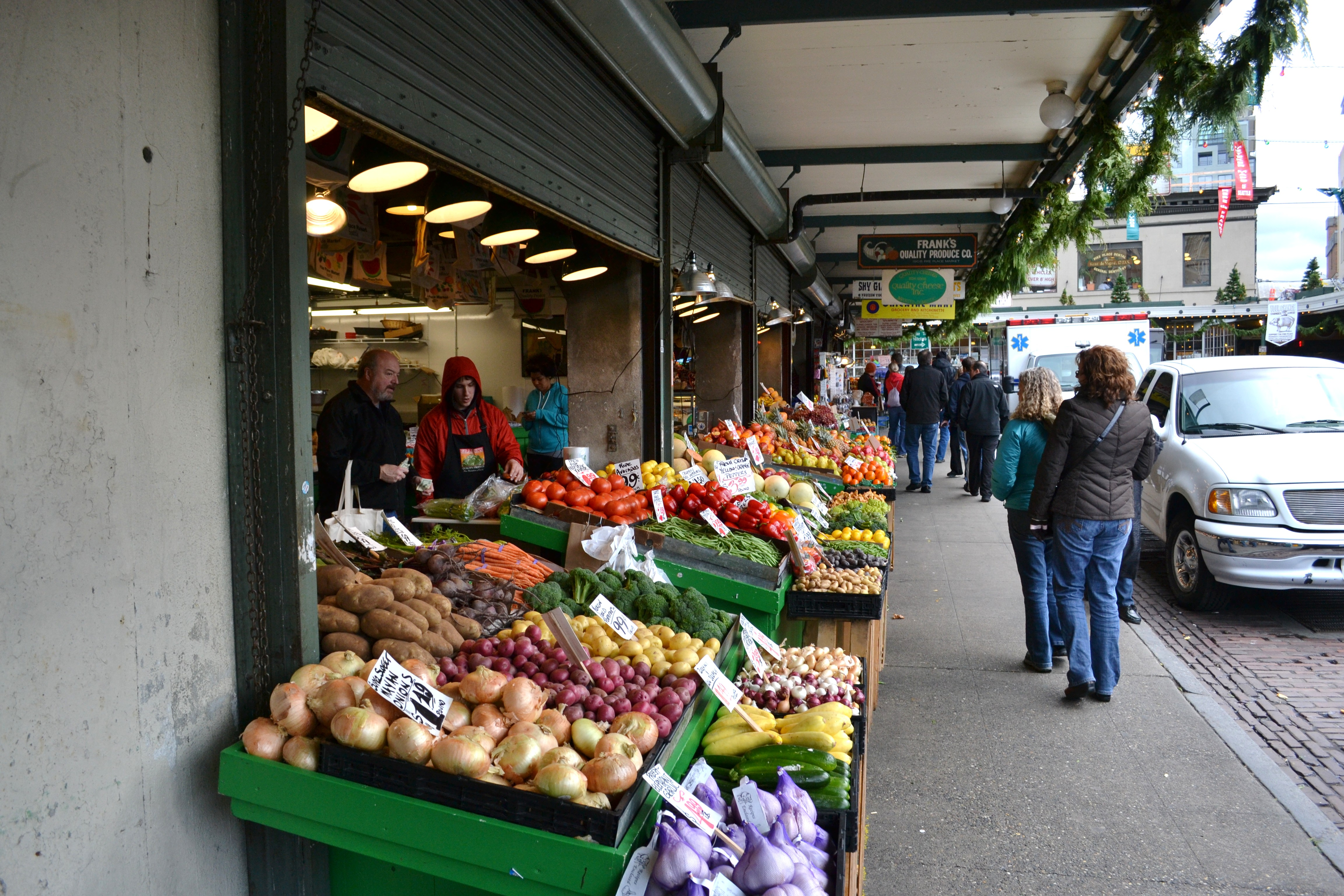
- Produce displays, 2011
- Interactive map of Frank's Quality Produce

Restaurant information
- Location: Seattle, King, Washington, 98101, United States
- Coordinates: 47.6089°N 122.3407°W
- Website: franksproduce.com

Frank's Quality Produce is a produce shop at Seattle's Pike Place Market, in the U.S. state of Washington.

== Description ==
Frank's Quality Produce operates in the Corner Market building and stocks seasonal produce such as arugula, butter lettuce, castelfranco, dill, dragon fruit, frisée, mangos, and mushrooms (including black truffles). The business has also sold fruit baskets and produce gift boxes.

== History ==
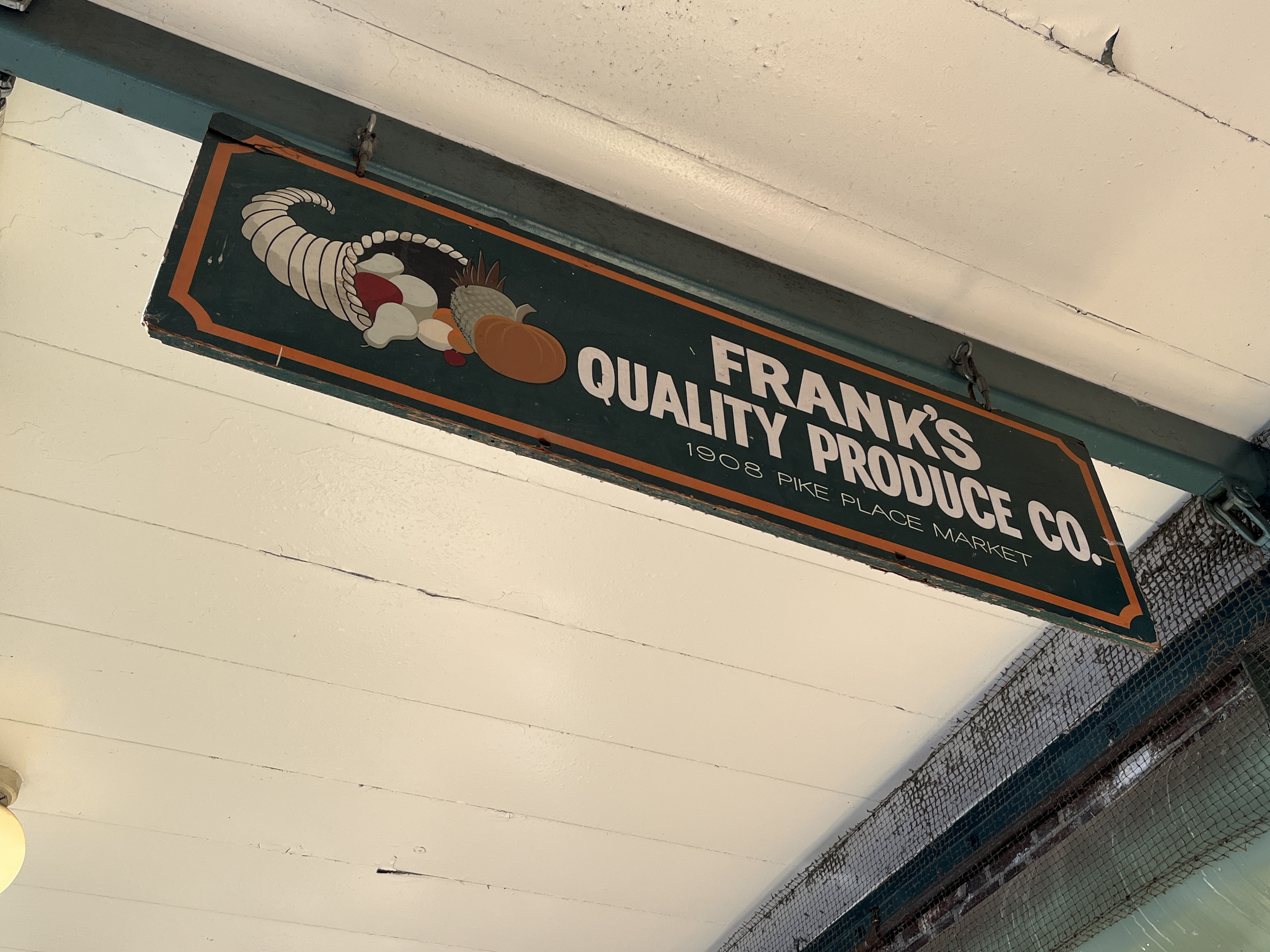
Sign for the shop, 2022

Established in 1928, the business has been owned and operated by four generation of the Genzale family. Frank Genzale is the owner as of 2020. Frank's is one of seven permanent produce hightails at Pike Place Market, as of 2021. During the COVID-19 pandemic, fruits and vegetables from Frank's were included in home-delivered Market Boxes, featuring products from various vendors at Pike Place Market.

== Reception ==
Aimee Rizzo included the business in The Infatuation's 2020 list of "Seattle produce stands to check out when you're tired of QFC".
