= Left Bank Books (Seattle) =

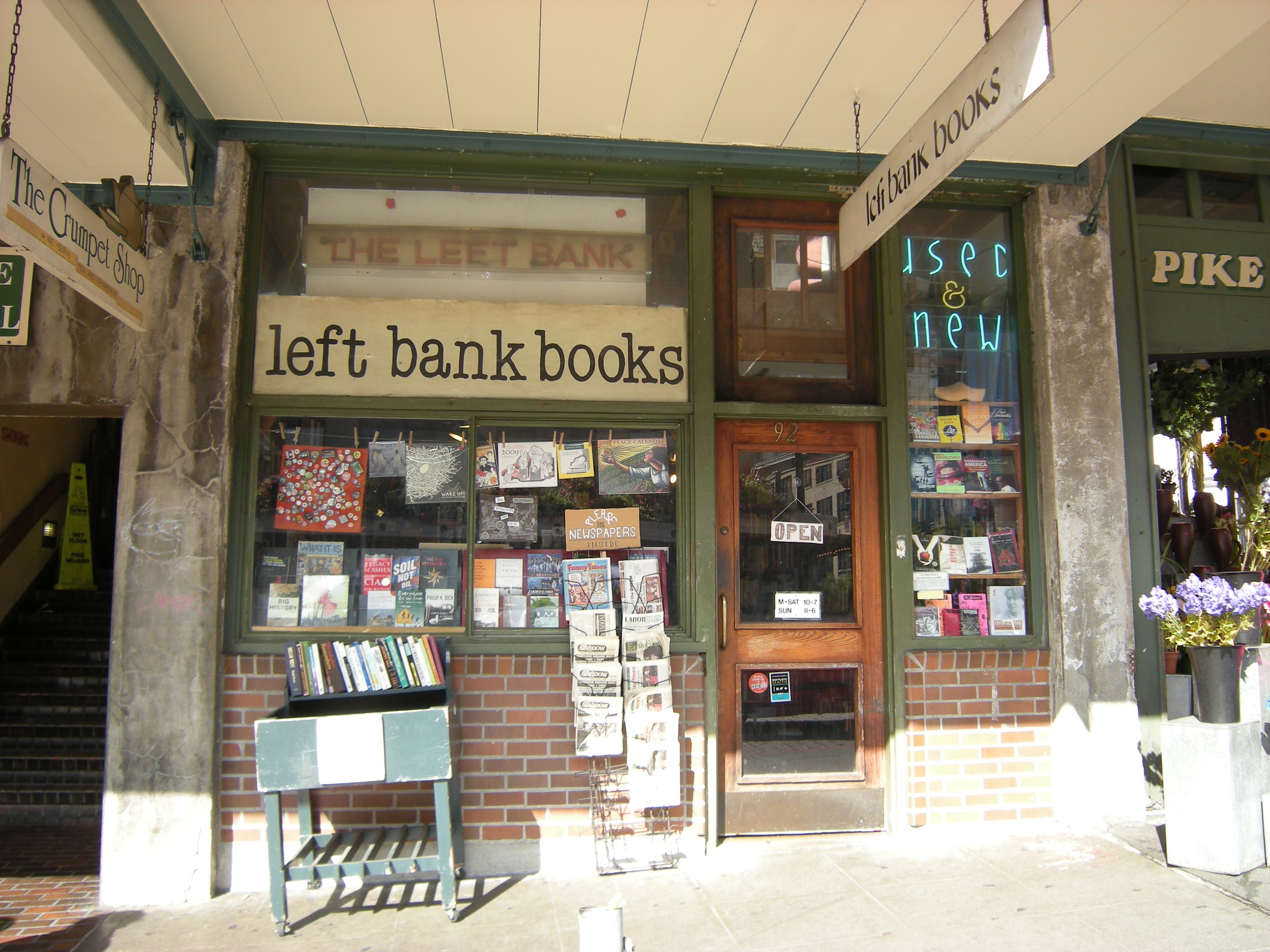
- Interactive map of the Left Bank Books area

General information
- Type: Retail store
- Location: Seattle, Washington, United States
- Coordinates: 47.6089°N 122.3404°W
- Opened: 1973

Website
- www.leftbankbooks.com

Note: There are independent bookstores named "Left Bank Books" in Belfast, Maine, in St. Louis, and in New York City.

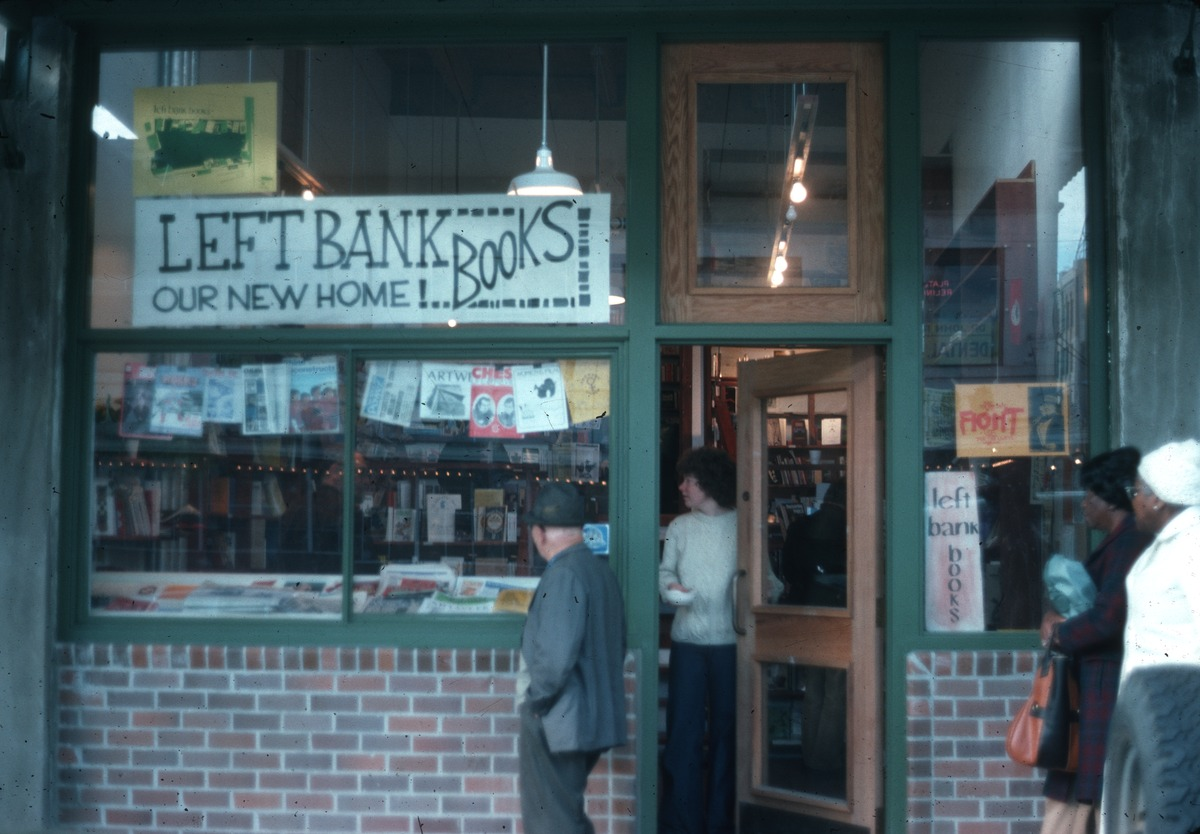
Left Bank Books in 1975

Left Bank Books Collective is an anarchist bookstore, founded in 1973, in Seattle, Washington. It is located at 92 Pike Street, in the Corner Market building at Pike Place Market. Its Lonely Planet review states that it "displays zines in español, revolutionary pamphlets, essays by Chomsky and an inherent suspicion of authority."

The store hosts occasional events that are described among the "top 15 things to do this week" or similar reviews in Seattle. It is also a small publisher, and it ran an IndieGoGo fundraising campaign in 2014, when it had been operating for 40 years.
