= Burnett, Washington =

Unincorporated community in Washington, United States

Burnett
- Unincorporated community
- Location within the state of Washington
- Coordinates: 47°7′45.98″N 122°2′52.01″W
- Country: United States
- State: Washington
- County: Pierce
- Time zone: UTC-8 (Pacific (PST))
  - Summer (DST): UTC-7 (PDT)

Burnett is an unincorporated community in Pierce County, Washington, United States. It lies just south of Buckley, Washington. It is on State Route 165 between Buckley, Washington and Mount Rainier National Park.

A post office called Burnett was established in 1888, and remained in operation until 1927. The community was named for Charles Hiram Burnett, Sr., a businessperson in the coal-mining industry.

There is private active grass airport in Burnett called Burnett Landing.
