= Thomas P. Revelle =

American attorney, politician, and preacher (1868–1937)

Reverend Thomas P. Revelle
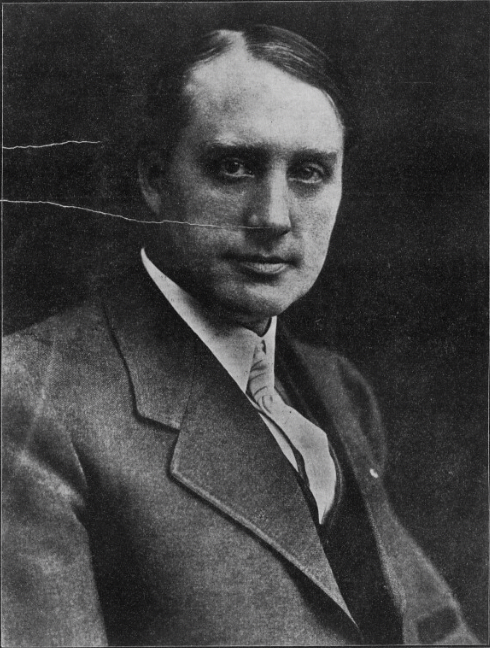
- Revelle in the September 2, 1910 edition of The Seattle Republican

Member of Seattle City Council
- In office 1906–1911

Personal details
- Born: Thomas Plummer Revelle; 1868 Maryland, US
- Died: July 5, 1937 (aged 69)
- Party: Republican
- Education: University of Washington
- Occupation: Attorney; politician; preacher

Thomas Plummer Revelle (1868 – July 5, 1937) was an American attorney, Republican politician, and preacher, who was a proponent member in the founding of Seattle's Pike Place Market.

== Biography ==
Revelle was born in Maryland in 1868, but moved to Seattle in 1898 to serve as a minister at a local Methodist church. He studied law at the University of Washington and became a member of the Washington State Bar Association. He ran for City Council and served from 1906 to 1911. In 1907, he sponsored a bill that helped open the Pike Place Market. He ran for Congress in 1910, but lost the election. He served as a United States Attorney for the Western district of Washington. Revelle helped prosecute and convict bootlegger Roy Olmstead, serving as an attorney for the Olmstead v. United States case.

Revelle died on July 5, 1937, aged 69, of heart disease and pneumonia.
