= Sanitary Market =

Building at Pike Place Market in Seattle, Washington, U.S.

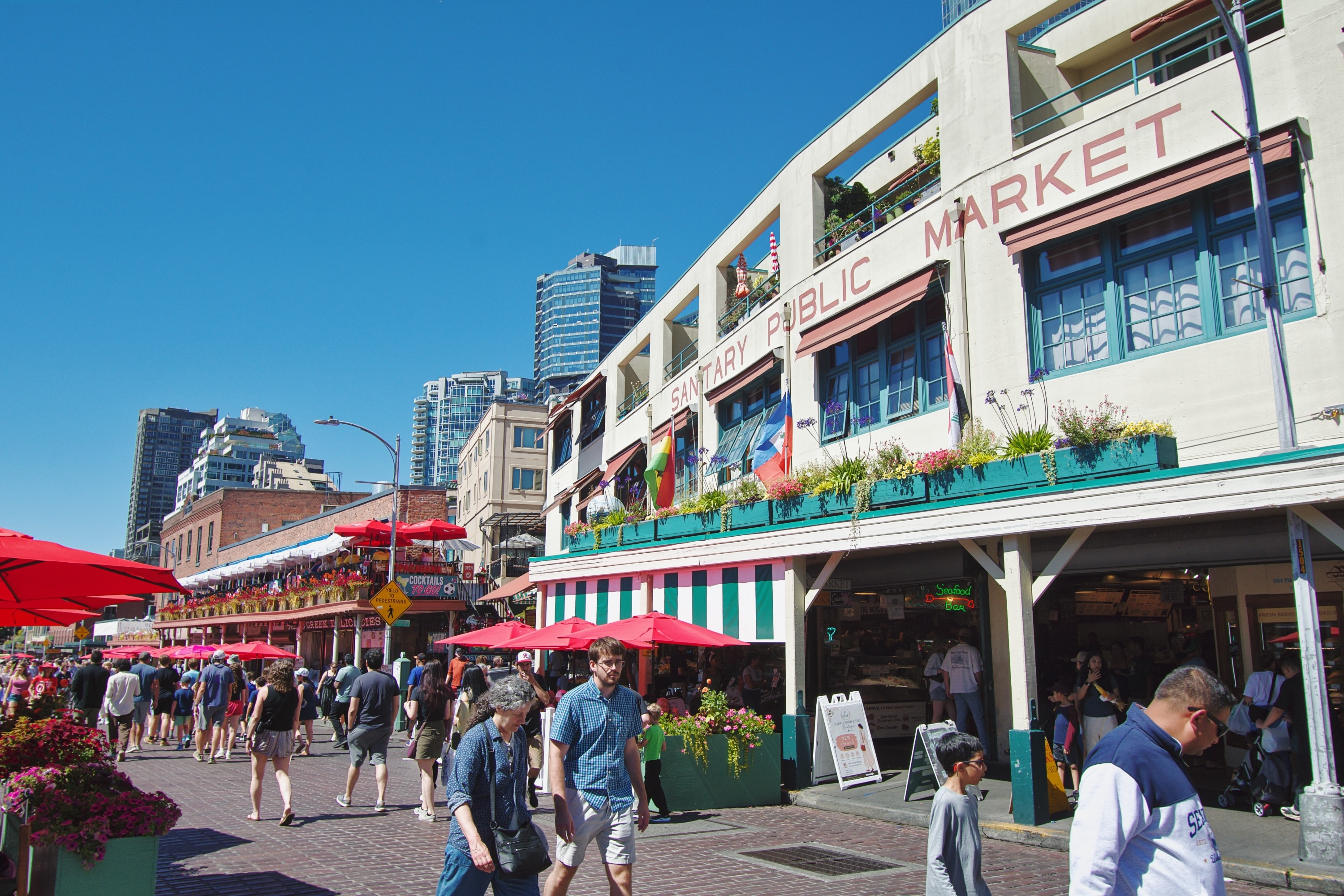
- The building's exterior in 2026
- Interactive map of the Sanitary Market area

General information
- Location: Pike Place Market, Seattle, Washington, United States
- Coordinates: 47°36′33″N 122°20′27.5″W

The Sanitary Market (also known as the Sanitary Market Building or the Sanitary Public Market) is a building at Seattle's Pike Place Market, in the U.S. state of Washington.

== History ==
The building opened in 1910 and burned in a large fire in 1941. Notable businesses that have operated in the building include El Mercado Latino, Jack's Fish Spot, and Three Girls Bakery.
