= Corner Market =

Building at Pike Place Market in Seattle, Washington, U.S.

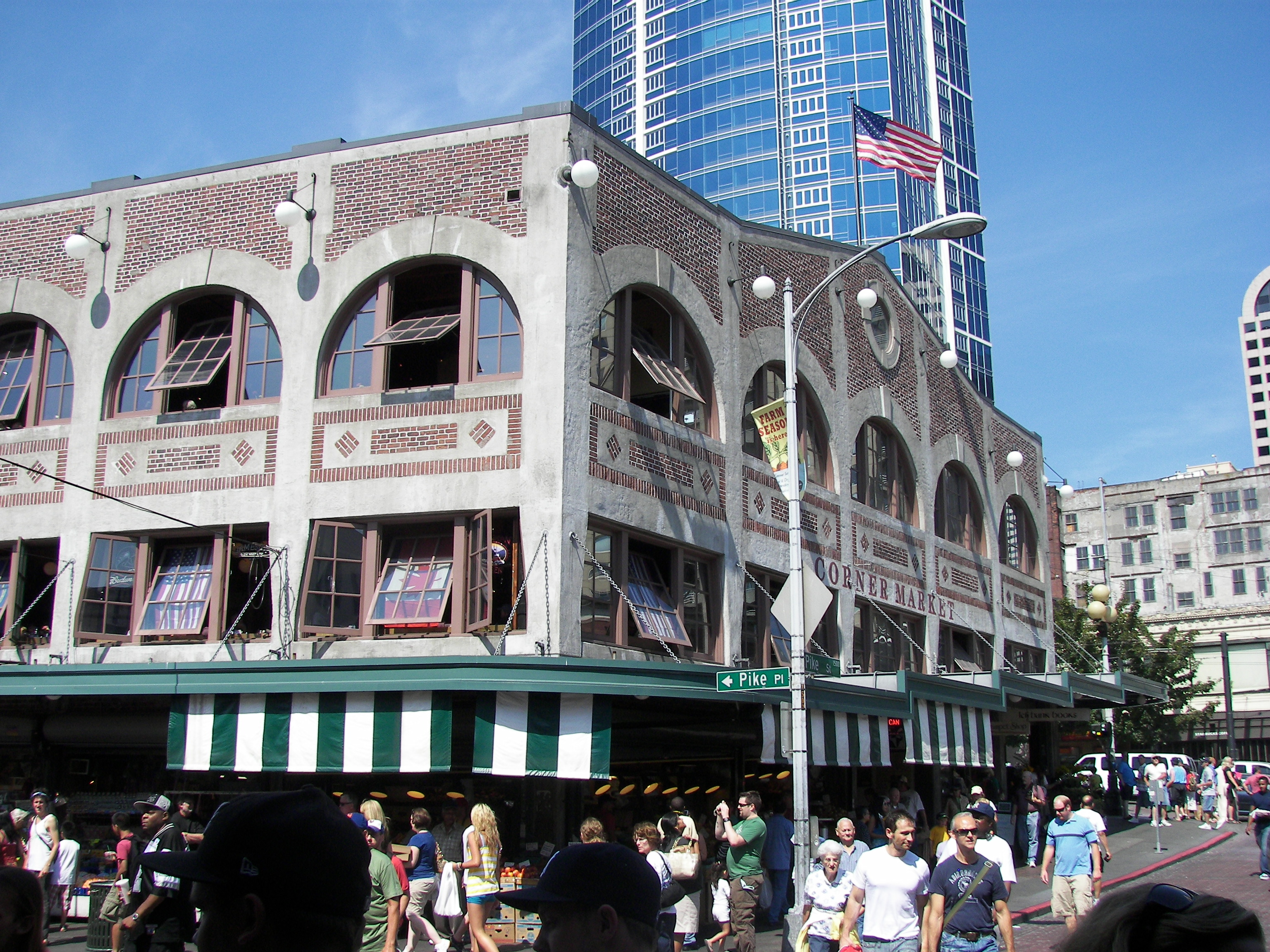
- The building's exterior in 2009
- Interactive map of the Corner Market area

General information
- Location: Pike Place Market, Seattle, Washington, United States
- Coordinates: 47°36′32″N 122°20′26″W

The Corner Market, or Corner Market Building, is a building at Seattle's Pike Place Market, in the U.S. state of Washington.

== History ==
The building was completed in 1912.

Businesses which have operated in the Corner Market include The Crumpet Shop, Frank's Quality Produce, Left Bank Books, Matt's in the Market, Oriental Mart, Radiator Whiskey, and Storyville Coffee.
