= Market Theatre =

Market Theatre and similar can mean:

- Market Theatre (Johannesburg), South Africa
- Market Theatre (Ledbury), in Herefordshire, England
- Lace Market Theatre, in Nottingham, England

== See also ==
- Market Theater Gum Wall, in Seattle, Washington, United States
