= Improv Comedy Mumbai =

Indian improvisational comedy group

Improv Comedy Mumbai is an Indian improv comedy troupe. The group was founded by Adam Dow who was originally a member of Unexpected Productions in Seattle. It was one of the first improv troupes in the country. Improv Comedy Mumbai has been part of the International TheatreSports League since 2014.
