= Ghost Alley Espresso =

Coffee shop in Seattle, Washington, U.S.

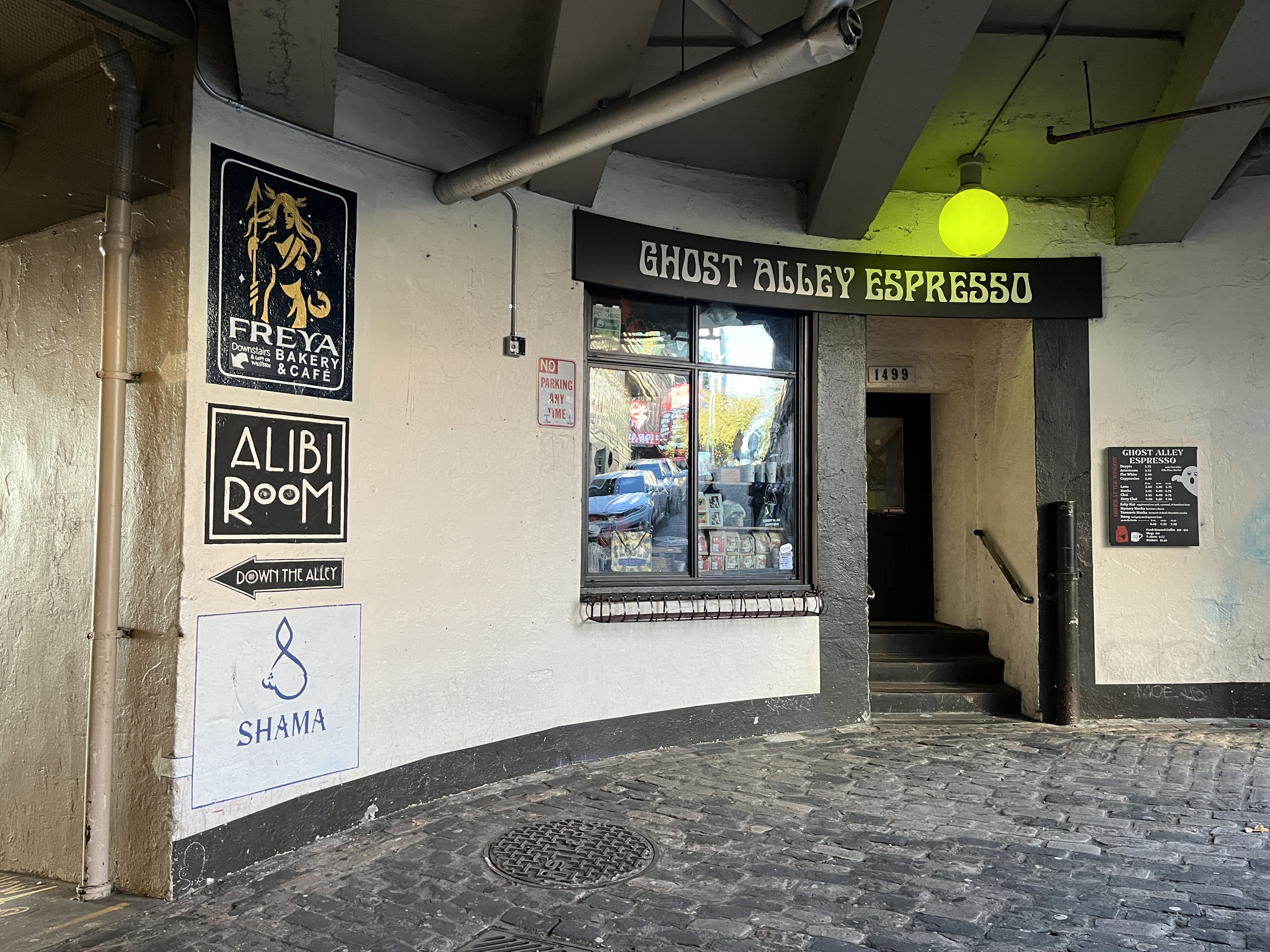
- The coffee shop in 2022
- Interactive map of Ghost Alley Espresso

Restaurant information
- Owner: Michael Buchwald
- Previous owner: Mercedes Carrabba
- Location: 1499 Post Alley, Seattle, King, Washington, 98101, United States
- Coordinates: 47.6086°N 122.3406°W
- Website: ghostalleyespresso.com

Ghost Alley Espresso is a coffee shop located at Pike Place Market in Seattle, Washington, United States. The business operates in a former service room for bathroom attendants on Post Alley, close to the Gum Wall. The current owner Michael Buchwald purchased the business from Mercedes Carrabba, who used the shop as a starting location for ghost tours. The space is supposedly haunted by the ghost of Arthur Goodwin, a former manager of Pike Place Market.

== Description ==
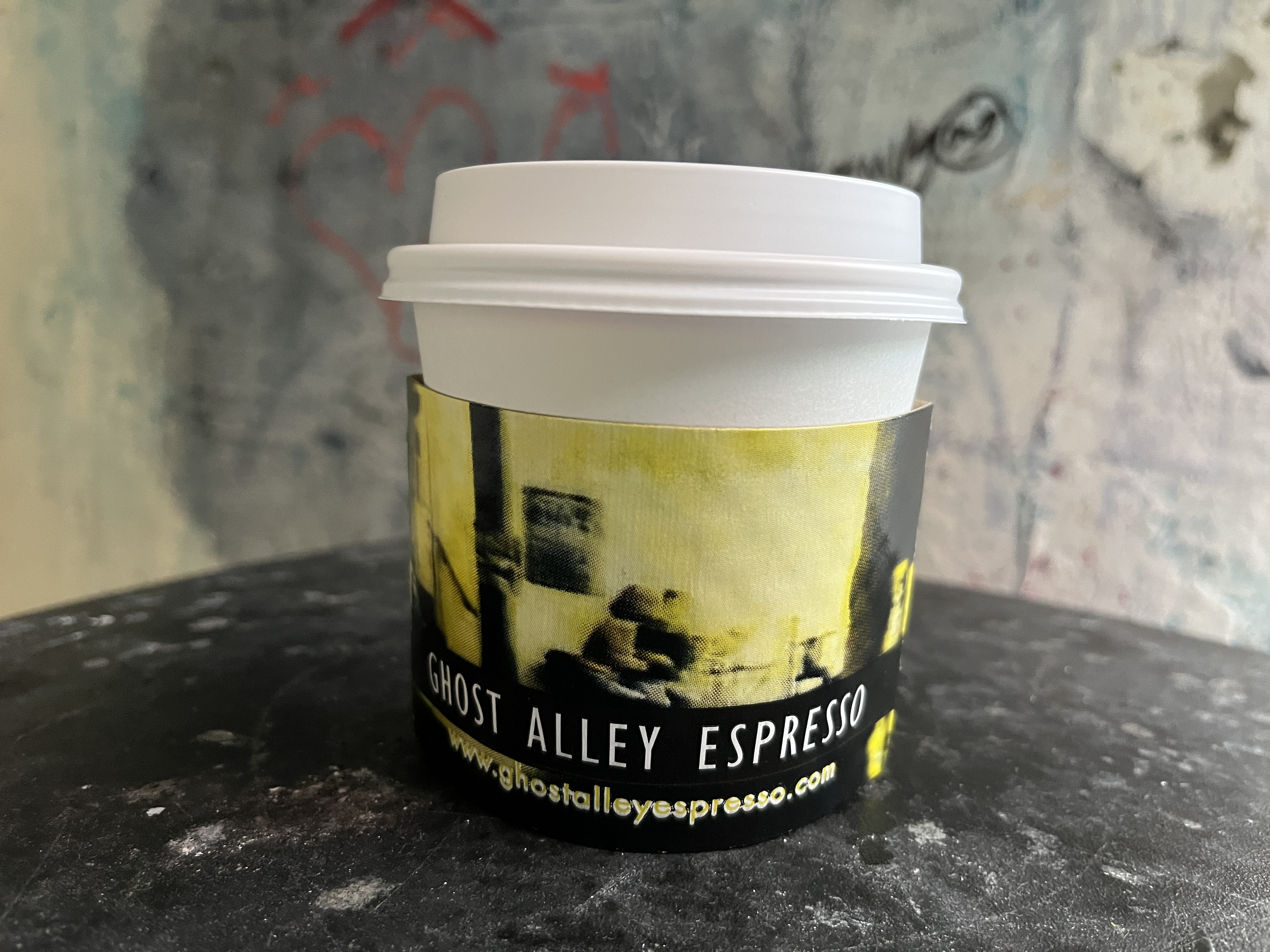
Coffee in a branded paper cup, 2022

Ghost Alley Espresso is a coffee shop located at Seattle's Pike Place Market. The business is sited on Post Alley in the city's Central Waterfront district, in a space that previously served as a bathroom attendants' room. In 2015, Rosemary Behan of The National described Ghost Alley Espresso as a "gorgeous, almost miniature-sized one-off coffee shop that uses the high-tech Modbar system – allowing it to mimic any espresso machine in the world by changing the settings".

According to Los Angeles Times, the business is a "hole-in-the-wall coffee joint". Leslie Budewitz's 2013 fiction book Peppermint Barked: A Spice Shop Mystery describes Ghost Alley Espresso as a "hidey-hole carved from a former storage and rest station for Market vendors".

Ghost Alley Espresso serves coffee drinks with an emphasis on unusual flavors such as "salty nut" and turmeric mochas. The shop has a small counter with a few stools, and has served as a starting point for ghost tours.

== History ==
As of 2022, Michael Buchwald is the owner of Ghost Alley Espresso. Previously, Mercedes Carrabba owned both Ghost Alley Espresso and Market Ghost Tours. In 2014, Christopher Reynolds of Los Angeles Times said Carrabba converted "a 147-square-foot closet into this snug caffeine haven and tour-guide headquarters".

In 2020, Carrabba read excerpts from her book Market Ghost Stories at Ghost Alley Espresso and other supposedly haunted locations at Pike Place Market. Rachael Jones of Seattle Refined has said of the haunt:

According to Ghost Alley Espresso's website, Arthur Goodwin, one of the Market's first managers and a designer of the buildings, kept his office closest to Ghost Alley Espresso. And he's known as their resident ghost. Goodwin is the spirit that makes himself the most known, with baristas at the shop claiming to have felt the presence of a man in the shop. With one barista stating they saw the apparition of a tall man wearing a hat and standing in the doorway.

In 2013, Ghost Alley Espresso participated in the Post Alley Hooley, a "neighborhood party" presented by the business-and-resident group Post Alley Project. The coffee shop was one of two in Seattle with a Modbar system as of 2015. During the COVID-19 pandemic, the business accepted orders via the front window.

== Reception ==
Ghost Alley Espresso has been recommended in multiple editions of the Not for Tourists Guide to Seattle. In 2017, Rebecca Mongrain of Seattle Refined said Ghost Alley served the city's best mocha. Reviews in Eater, The Infatuation, the Seattle Metropolitan, and The Times have encouraged readers to visit Ghost Alley Espresso instead of the Original Starbucks. Connor McGovern included Ghost Alley Espresso in National Geographic's 2026 list of Seattle's seven best coffee shops.

== See also ==
- List of reportedly haunted locations in the United States
- List of restaurants in Pike Place Market
