= 1st Avenue (Seattle) =

Major street in Seattle, Washington, US

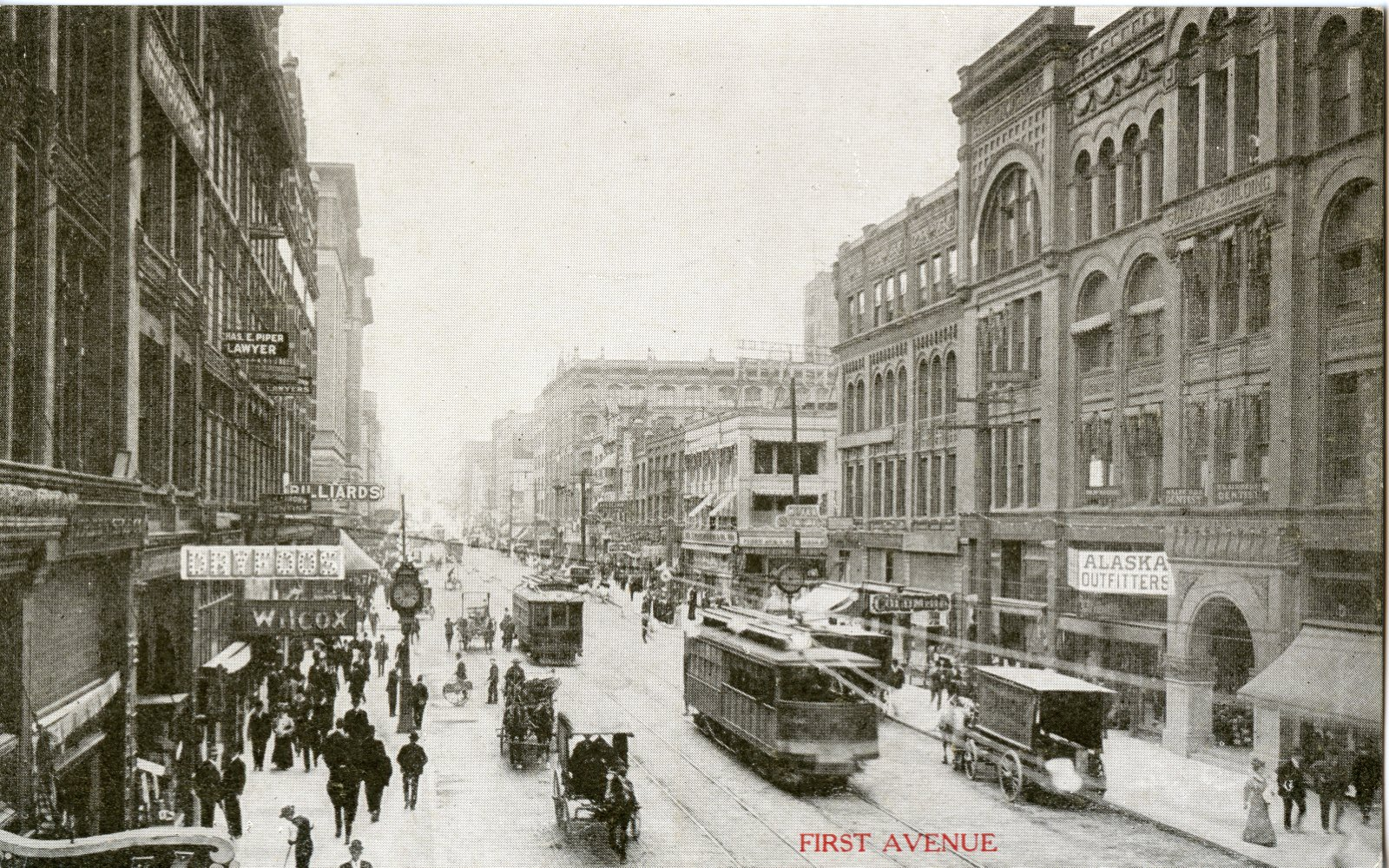
1st Avenue in 1910

1st Avenue is a major street in Seattle, Washington, United States. It traverses Downtown Seattle, including Pioneer Square and Belltown, as well as the adjacent neighborhoods of SoDo and Lower Queen Anne. Numerous landmarks including parks, museums, and historic buildings are located along the street, including Pike Place Market. The Great Seattle Fire of 1889 destroyed much of it and it had to be rebuilt. Parades have taken place on it before and after the fire.

== History ==
1st Avenue is called "Seattle's oldest thoroughfare".

Seattle's original street system was a misaligned grid created by three of the original settlers. Today's 1st Avenue was Front Street north of Yesler in Arthur A. Denny's plat, and Commercial Street to its south in Doc Maynard's. The grid persists in the 21st century and 1st Avenue makes two 20-degree bends where it enters and exits the Downtown Seattle core, or Denny's plat.

=== Great Seattle Fire and Underground Seattle ===
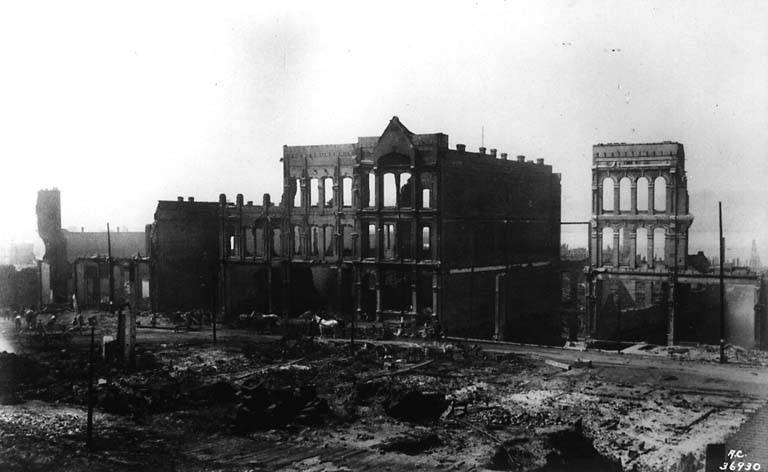
View of 1st Avenue from Columbia Street after Great Seattle Fire of June 6, 1889

1st Avenue South in Pioneer Square is built over and adjacent to "areaways" comprising Underground Seattle, dating to rebuilding following the Great Seattle Fire of 1889. The fire began where the Federal Office Building (Seattle) now stands. Street level was lifted one story in most of Pioneer Square.

=== Rebuilding ===
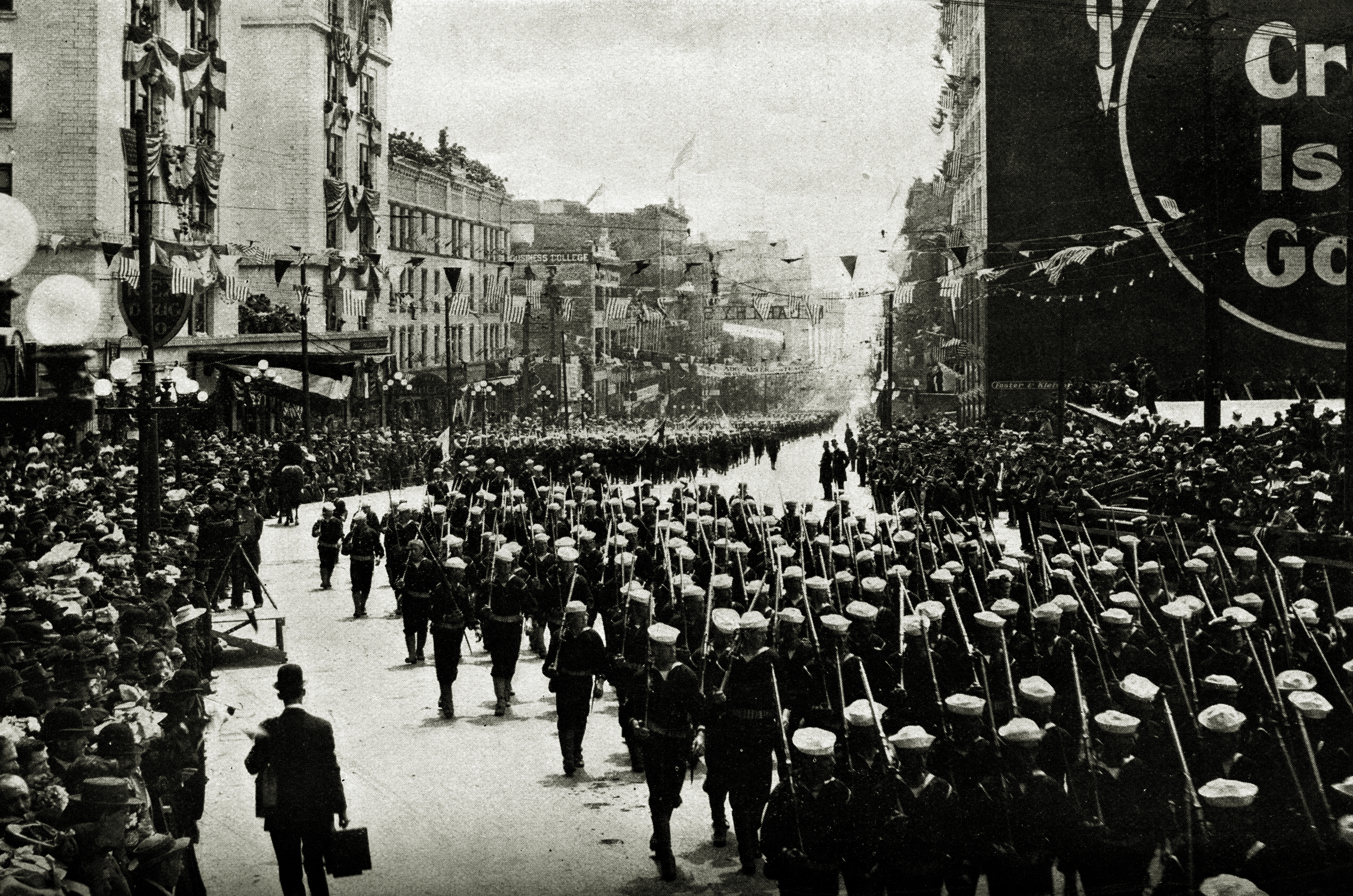
Parade on 1st Avenue in the early 1900s

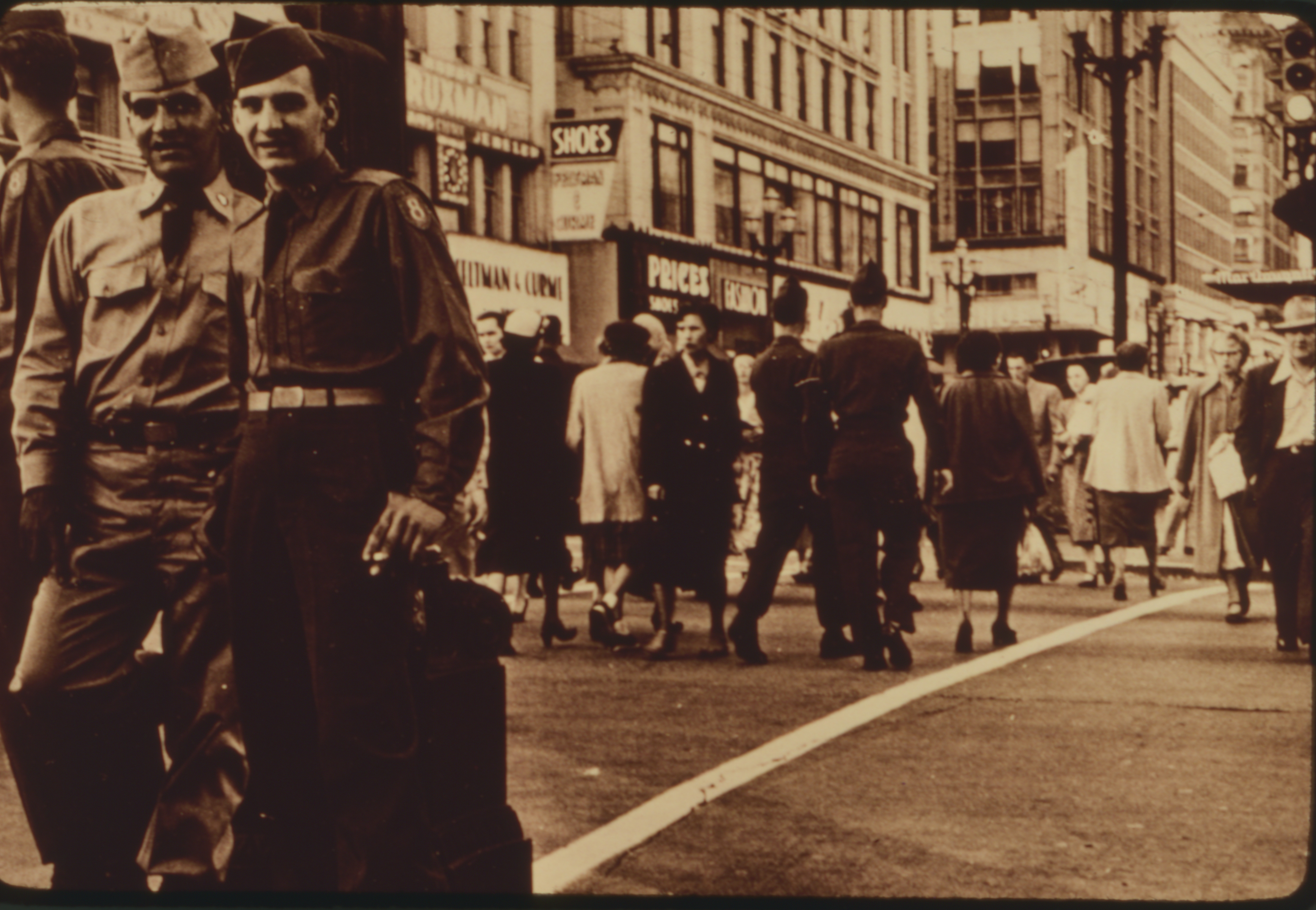
1st Avenue circa 1942

After the Great Fire, present-day Pioneer Square was rebuilt with fireproof materials including stone and brick, often with iron structural members. Historic buildings from this period on 1st Avenue that remained in the late 20th century include:

- Pioneer Square pergola (1909)
- Pioneer Building (1889–90)
- Mutual Life Building (1892) on the site of Seattle's first community building, Yesler's cookhouse
- Yesler Building (1890–95)
- Schwabacher Building (1890)
- Terry-Denny Building (1889–90)
- Maynard Building (1892)
- Lippy Building (1900)
- The City Club (1906)
- State Hotel (1890)
- Grand Central Building (1889)
- Globe Hotel (1890)
- Bread of Life Mission (1889)
- Maud Building (1889)
- Squire Building (1900)
- Smith Building (1900)
- Seattle Quilt Building (1904)
- Pacific Marine Building (1905)
- Wax & Raine Building (1904)
- Seller Building (1906)
- Hambach Building (1907)
- Seattle Hardware (1904)
- Flatiron Building (a.k.a. Triangle Hotel and Bar) (1908–10)

Just north of Pioneer Square is the 1889 Colman Building.

=== Pike Place Market ===
Pike Place Market (opened 1907), "one of Seattle's most famous cultural and commercial institutions", faces 1st Avenue on its east side, between Pike Street and Virginia Street.

== Street description ==
=== SoDo ===
1st Avenue South is an arterial through the center of the South of Downtown (SoDo) industrial area of Seattle. It is designated as one of three or four north-south "major truck streets" in the district. Starbucks Center, built in 1912 and headquarters of Starbucks since 1997, is on 1st Avenue South in SoDo. After it briefly joins State Route 99 then crossing the Duwamish River via the First Avenue South Bridge, the route becomes State Route 509 leading roughly to Seattle-Tacoma International Airport.

=== Downtown towers ===
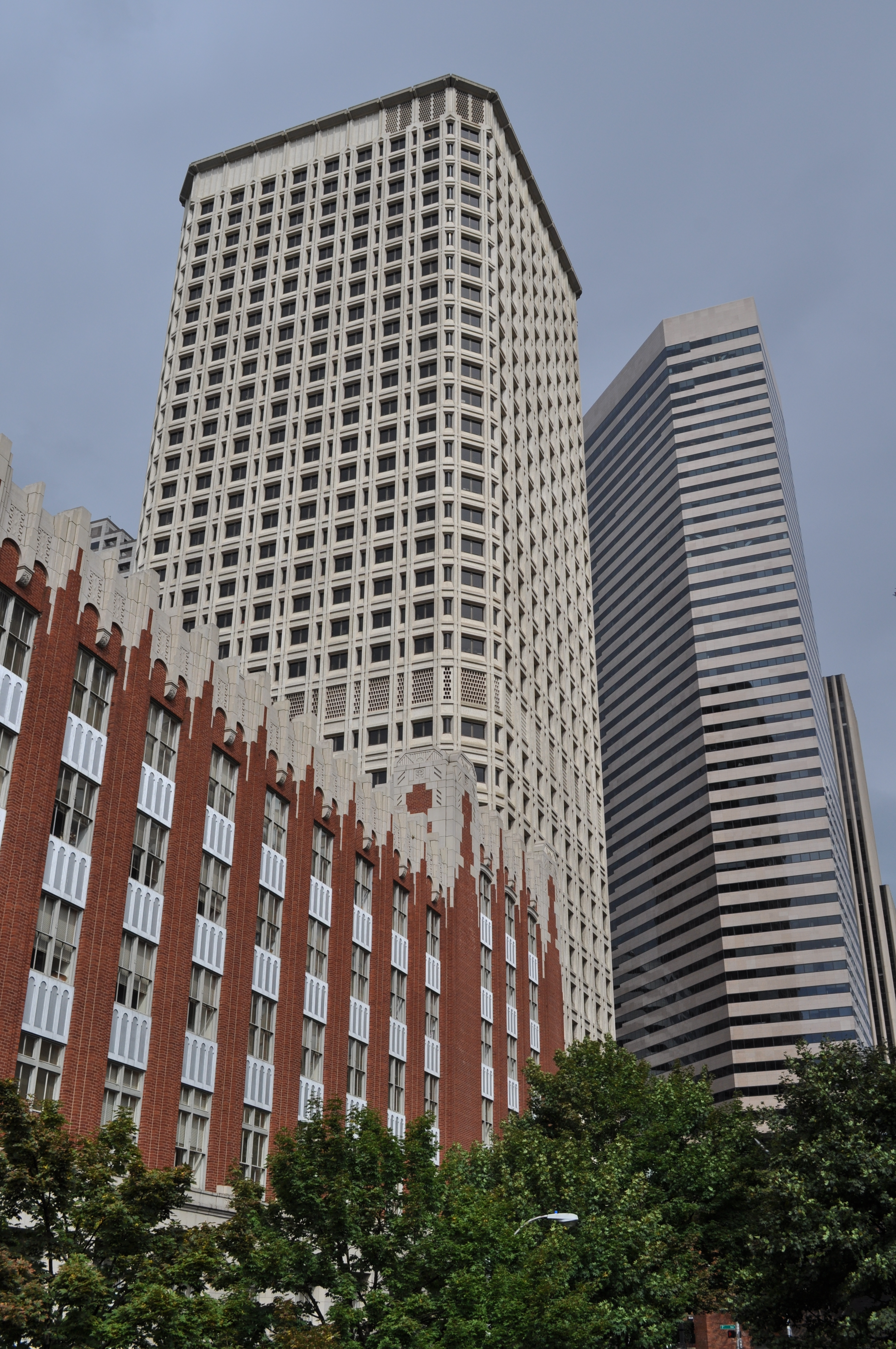
Old and new Federal Buildings on 1st Avenue

Although the tallest Downtown towers are a few streets to the east in the Metropolitan Tract and elsewhere, 1st Avenue has some notable skyscrapers including the 37-story Henry M. Jackson Federal Building.

=== Stairclimbs ===
Owing to the hilly terrain of Downtown Seattle, several notable public stairways run east-west intersecting 1st Avenue: the Spring Street steps and Harbor Steps connecting the Central Waterfront downhill from First; and steps on both sides of the Jackson Federal Building and the south side of the Seattle Art Museum leading uphill from First.

== Crime ==
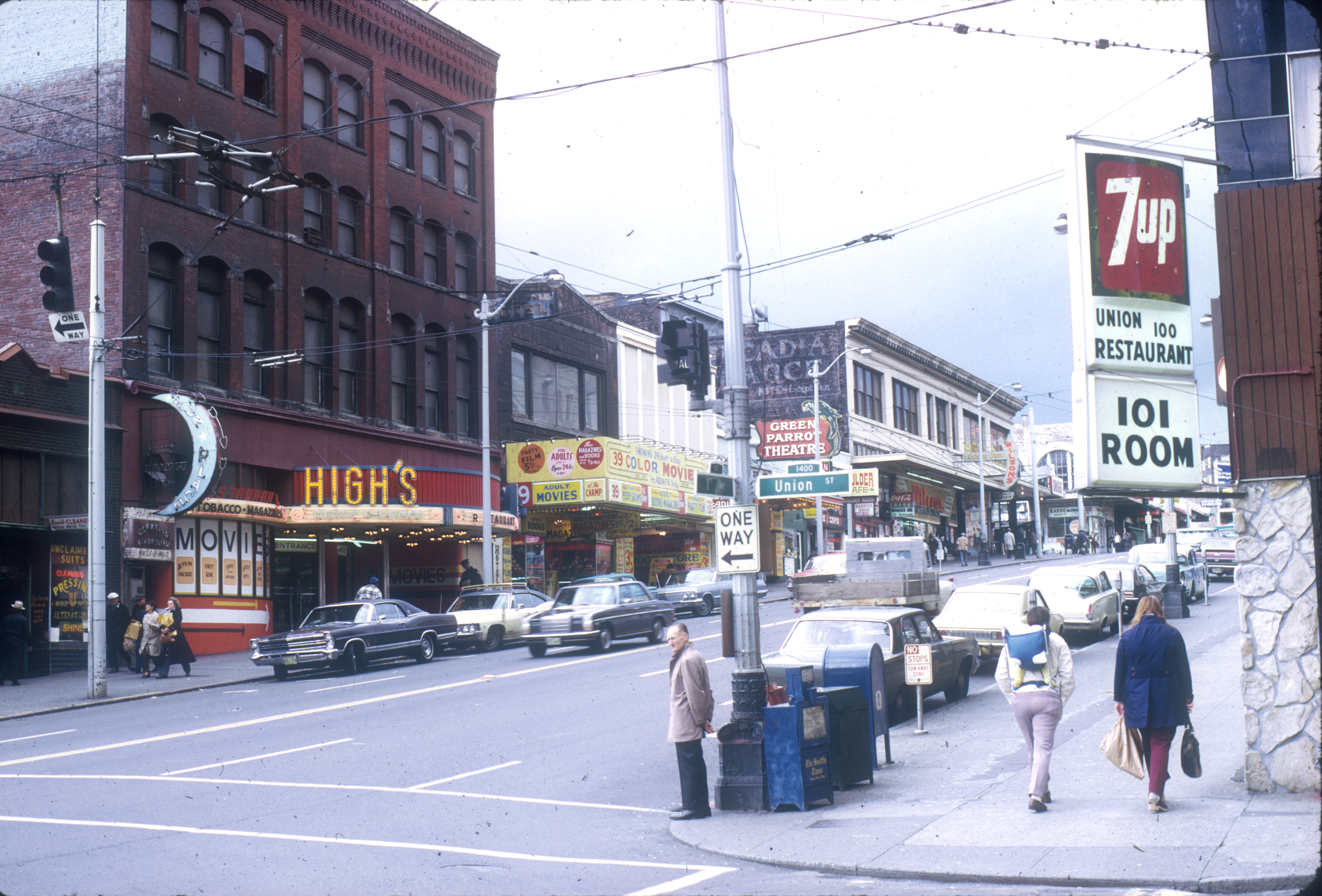
1st Avenue at Pike Place Market in 1972. Peepshows line the west side of the block.

After World War II, 1st Avenue was nicknamed "Flesh Avenue", and from the 1950s to the 1980s, police raids at peep shows and other adult-oriented businesses in the First and Pike Street block were frequent and the corner was called a haven for "street crazies and druggies, prostitutes, players and partyers". The Seattle Times said in 2006, "For decades, the Pike-Pine corridor between First and Third avenues has been known for run-down buildings, parking lots prone to drug deals and heroin addicts ... effectively a dam separating Pike Place Market and its 9 million annual visitors from the city's shopping and convention areas." 1st Avenue between Bell and Blanchard, where Belltown meets Downtown, was ranked as Seattle's third most dangerous block in 2013, with 135 violent crimes reported.

== Gallery ==
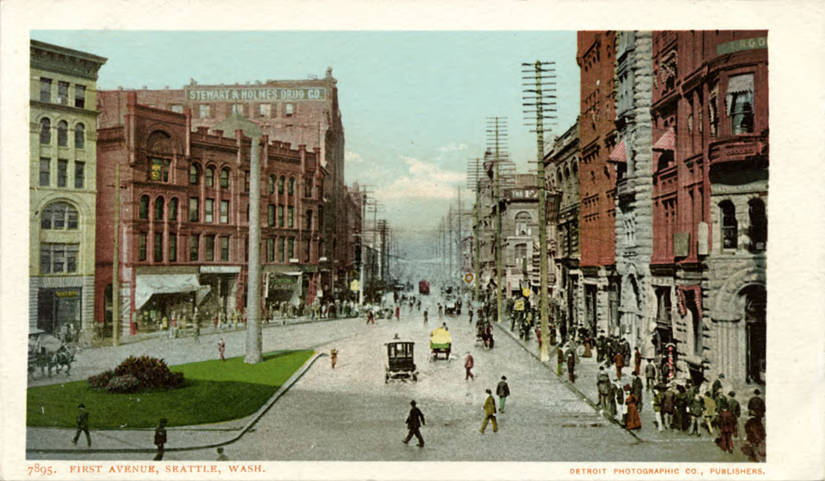
Photo postcard of 1st Avenue from the early 20th century

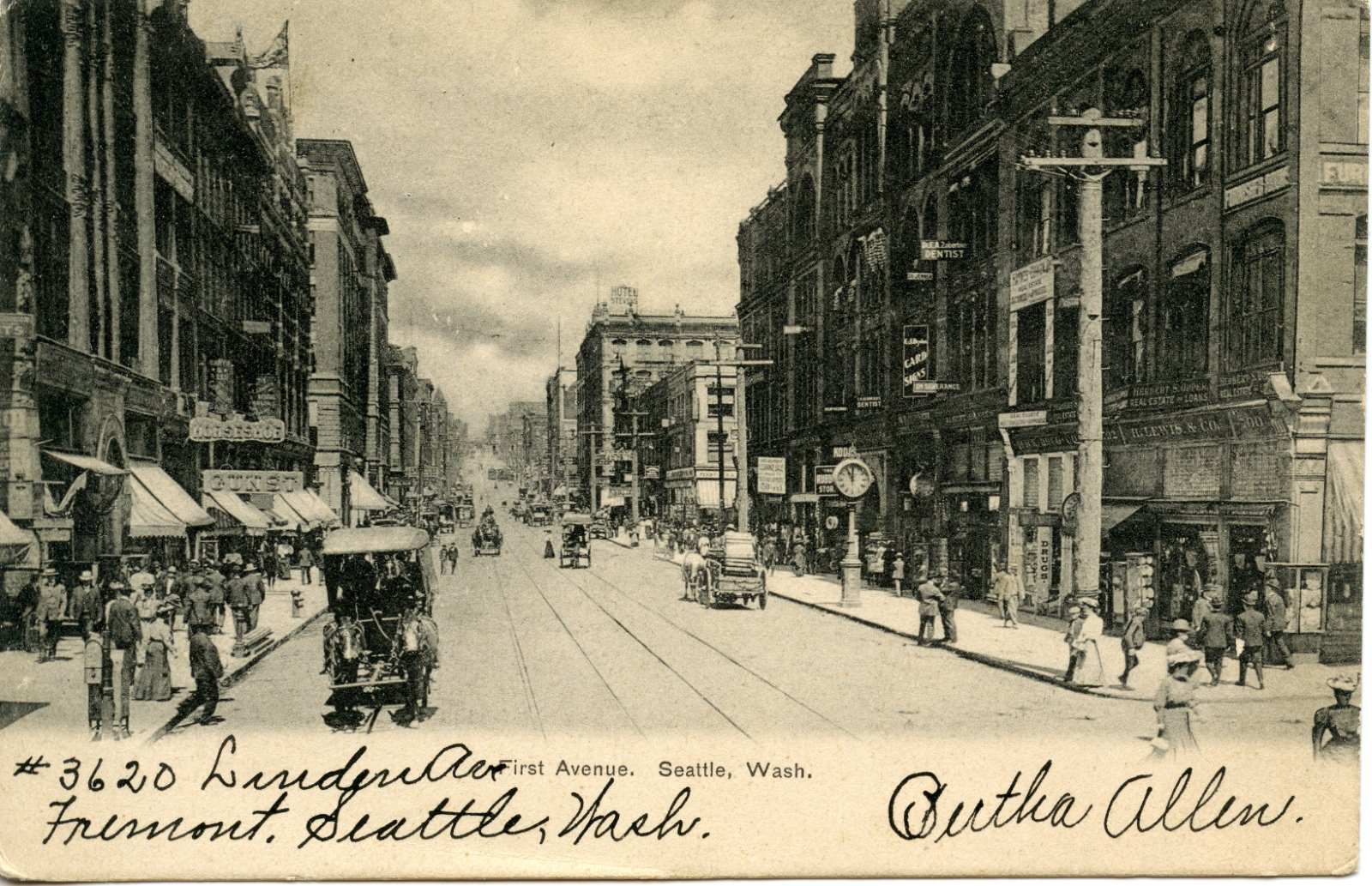

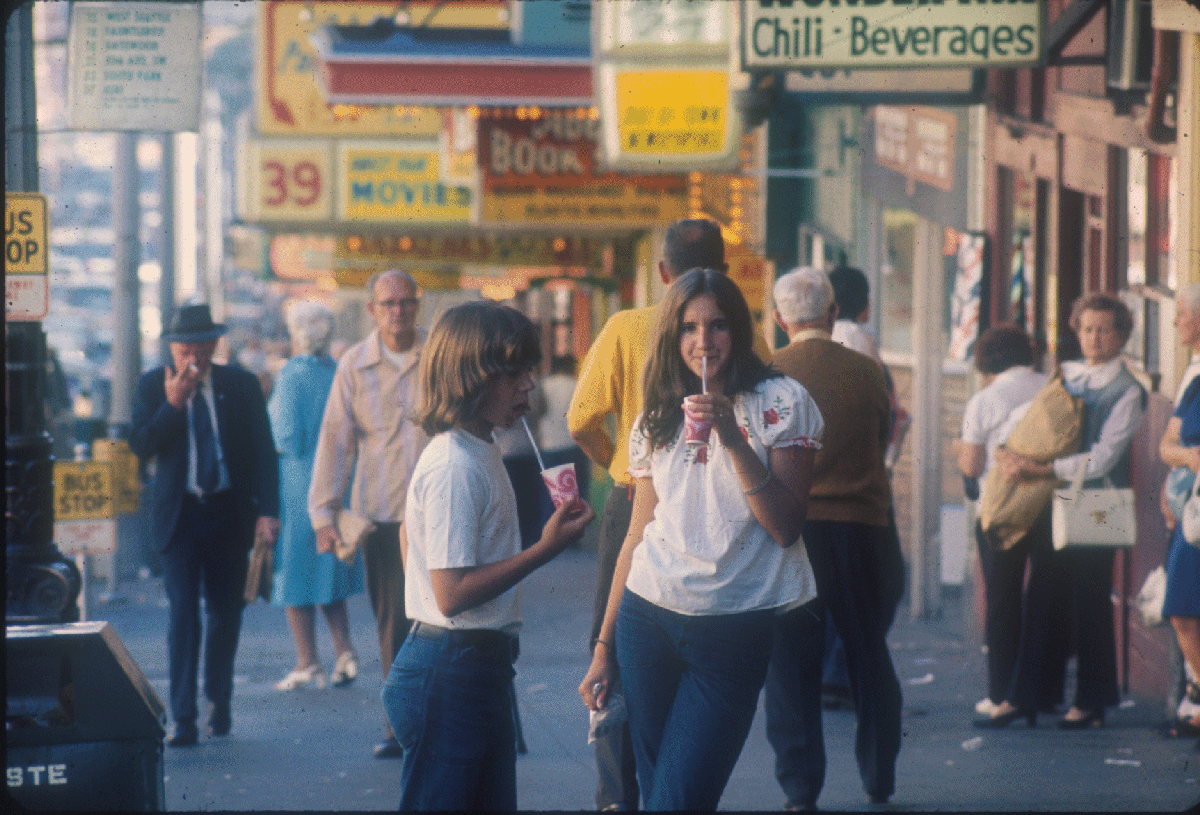
1972
