= Cafe Campagne =

Restaurant in Seattle, Washington, U.S.

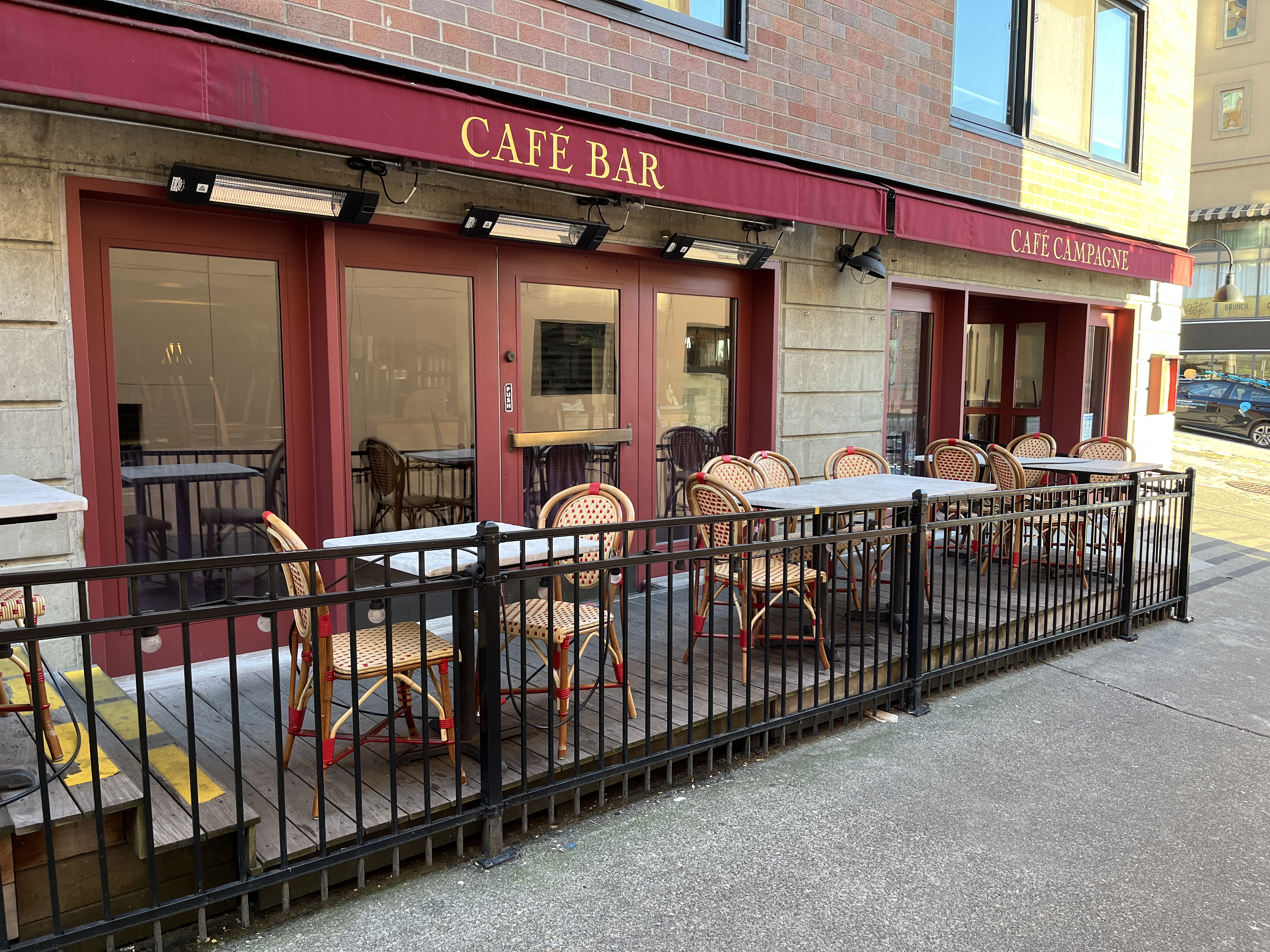
- The cafe's exterior, 2022
- Interactive map of Cafe Campagne

Restaurant information
- Owner: Daisley Gordon
- Food type: French
- Location: 1600 Post Alley, Seattle, King, Washington, 98101, United States
- Coordinates: 47°36′35.3″N 122°20′29.7″W
- Website: cafecampagne.com

Cafe Campagne is a Black-owned French restaurant on Post Alley in Seattle's Pike Place Market, in the U.S. state of Washington. Daisley Gordon is the owner.

The menu has included asparagus salad, brioche French toast, pan-roasted chicken, oeufs en meurette, and quiches. The Seattle Metropolitan included the business in a 2022 overview of the city's 100 best restaurants.

== See also ==
- List of Black-owned restaurants
- List of French restaurants
- List of restaurants in Pike Place Market
