= The Pink Door =

Italian restaurant in Seattle, Washington, U.S.

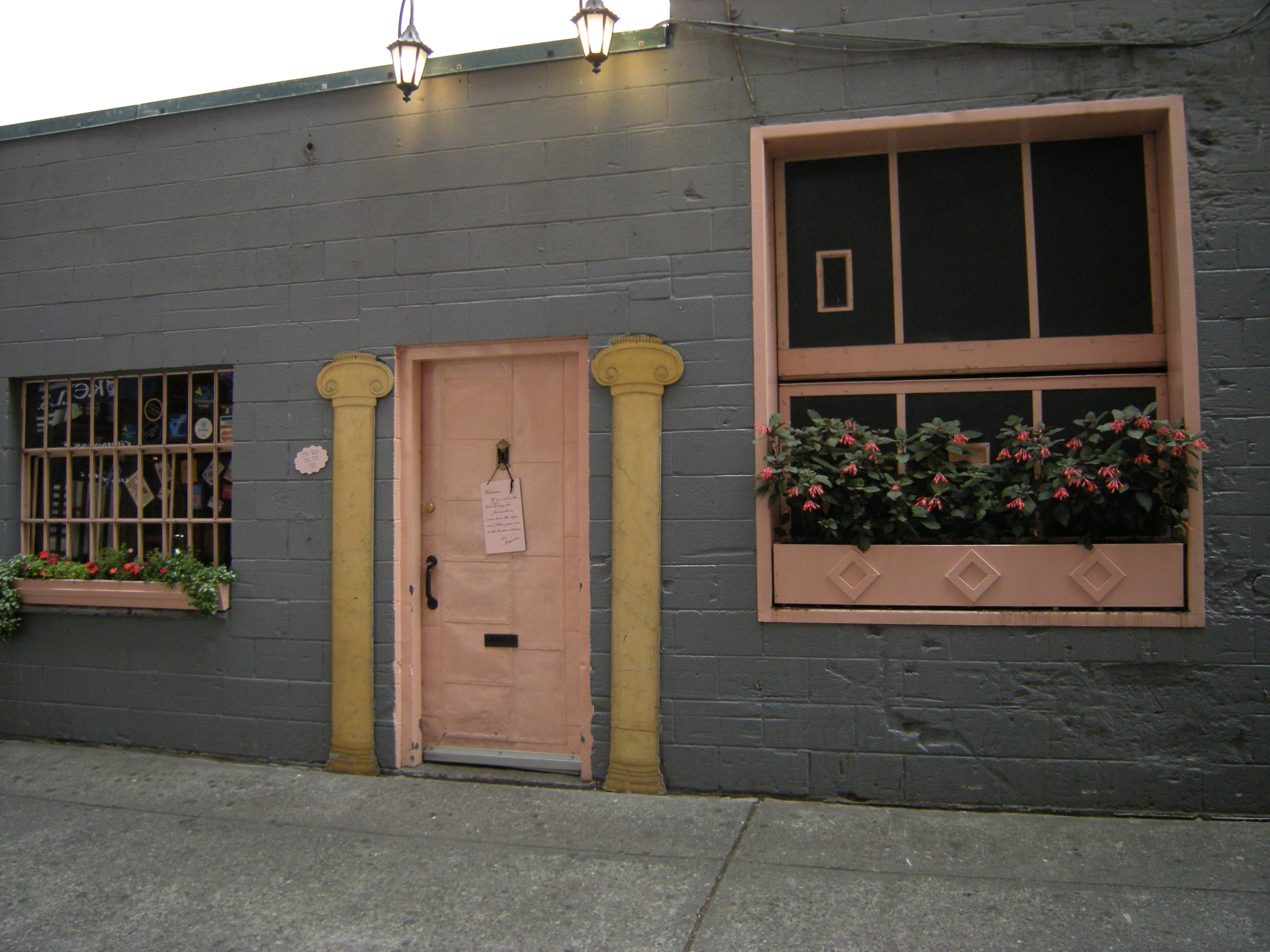
- Exterior
- Interactive map of The Pink Door

Restaurant information
- Food type: Italian
- Location: 1919 Post Alley, Seattle, Washington, 98101, United States
- Coordinates: 47°36′37.3″N 122°20′33.2″W

The Pink Door is a restaurant in Seattle's Pike Place Market, in the U.S. state of Washington.

== Description ==
The Pink Door is located on Post Alley in Pike Place Market, in Seattle's Central Waterfront district. The restaurant serves Italian cuisine and has a covered patio.

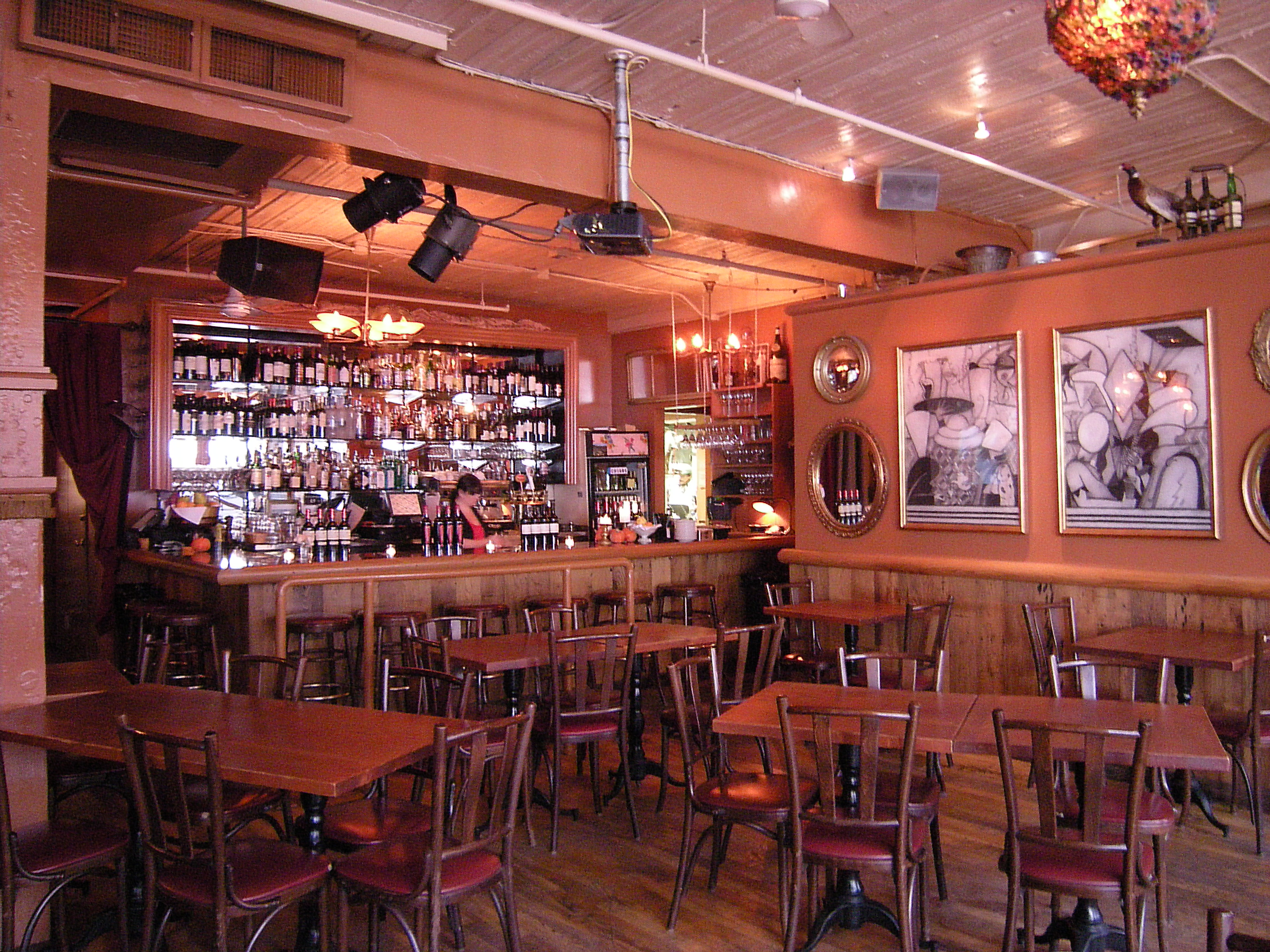
Interior

Emma Banks of Thrillist described The Pink Door as "a longstanding escape from the hustle and bustle of downtown specializing in Italian-American cuisine". She wrote, "Like lots of Italian food, the menu here is inspired by family gatherings and secret recipes, and like lots of Seattle-area restaurants, the ingredients are mostly local, sourced almost exclusively from Butler Farms just across the water on Bainbridge Island."

== History ==
The Pink Door was founded in 1981 by Jackie Roberts. The restaurant launched a membership program in 2017. During the COVID-19 pandemic, the business received money from the Restaurant Revitalization Fund in 2021.

== Reception ==
Emma Banks included The Pink Door in Thrillist's 2022 list of "The Most Romantic Restaurants in Seattle".

== See also ==
- List of Italian restaurants
- List of restaurants in Pike Place Market
