= Pike Place Chowder =

Seafood restaurant in Seattle, Washington, U.S.

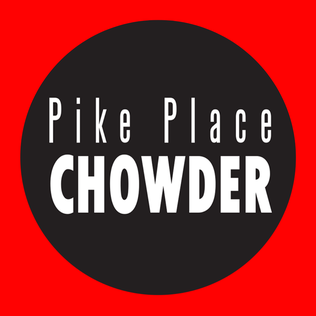

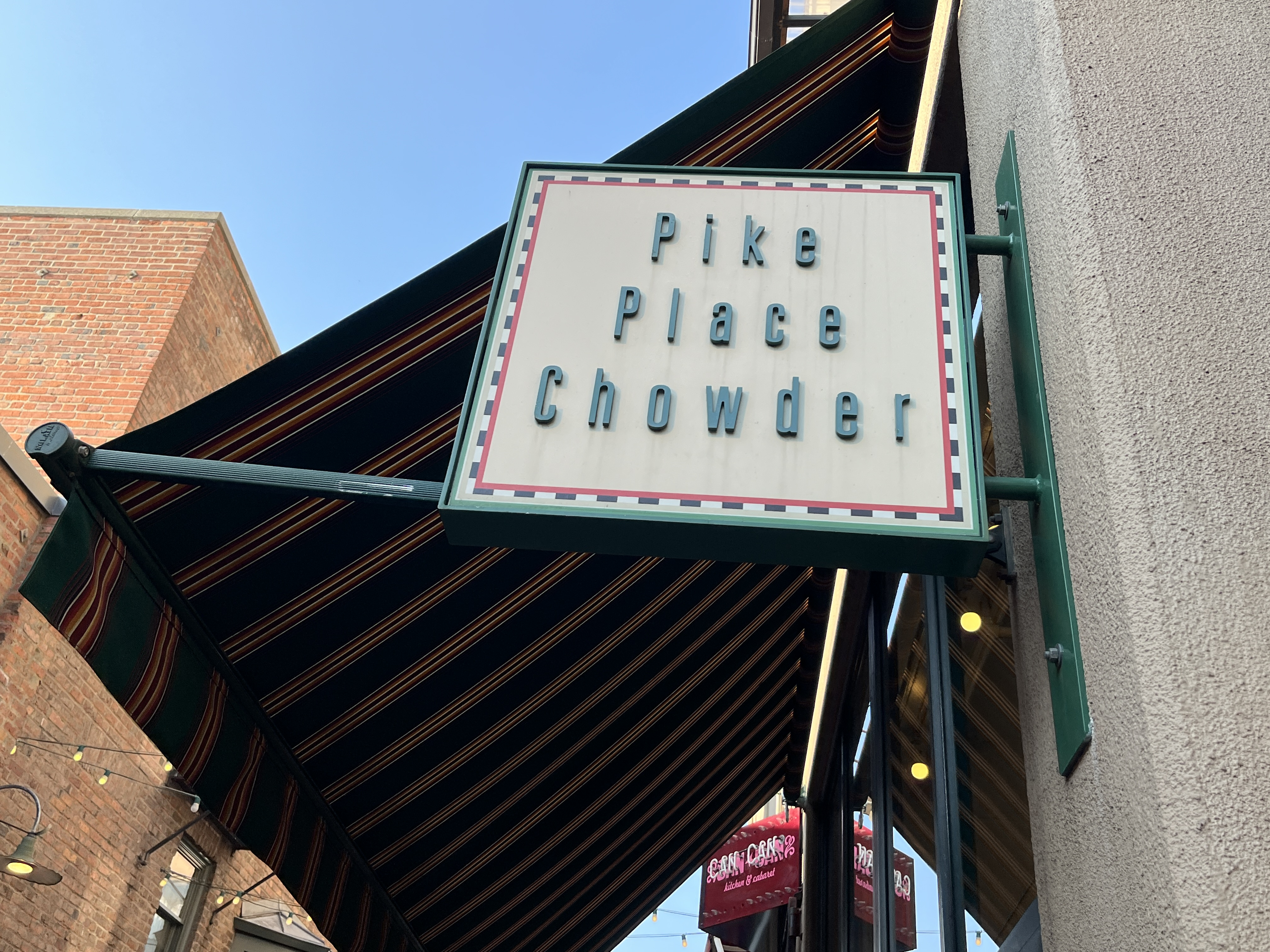
- Exterior sign at the Pike Place Market location, 2022
- Interactive map of Pike Place Chowder

Restaurant information
- Food type: Seafood
- Location: Seattle, Washington, United States
- Coordinates: 47.6094°N 122.3412°W

Pike Place Chowder is a seafood restaurant with two locations in Seattle, in the U.S. state of Washington.

== Description ==
Pike Place Chowder has two locations in Seattle, on Post Alley in Pike Place Market; and in Pacific Place. The seafood restaurant specializes in New England clam chowder; varieties include clam, crab and oyster, salmon, and scallop, and all are served with a sourdough bread bowl. The menu has also included crab and lobster rolls as well as seafood bisque. The Pike Place Market location has outdoor seating.

== History ==
Lucas Peterson of Eater said the restaurant "began entering chowder cook-offs in the 1990s on the both coasts, and absolutely destroyed the competition with their secret recipe. Now, they're serving up steaming bowls of multiple chowder varieties to lines of locals and tourists each day."

== See also ==
- List of restaurants in Pike Place Market
- List of seafood restaurants
