= Main Seattle Post Office =

Post office buildings in Seattle

Coordinates: 47.6086°N 122.3363°W

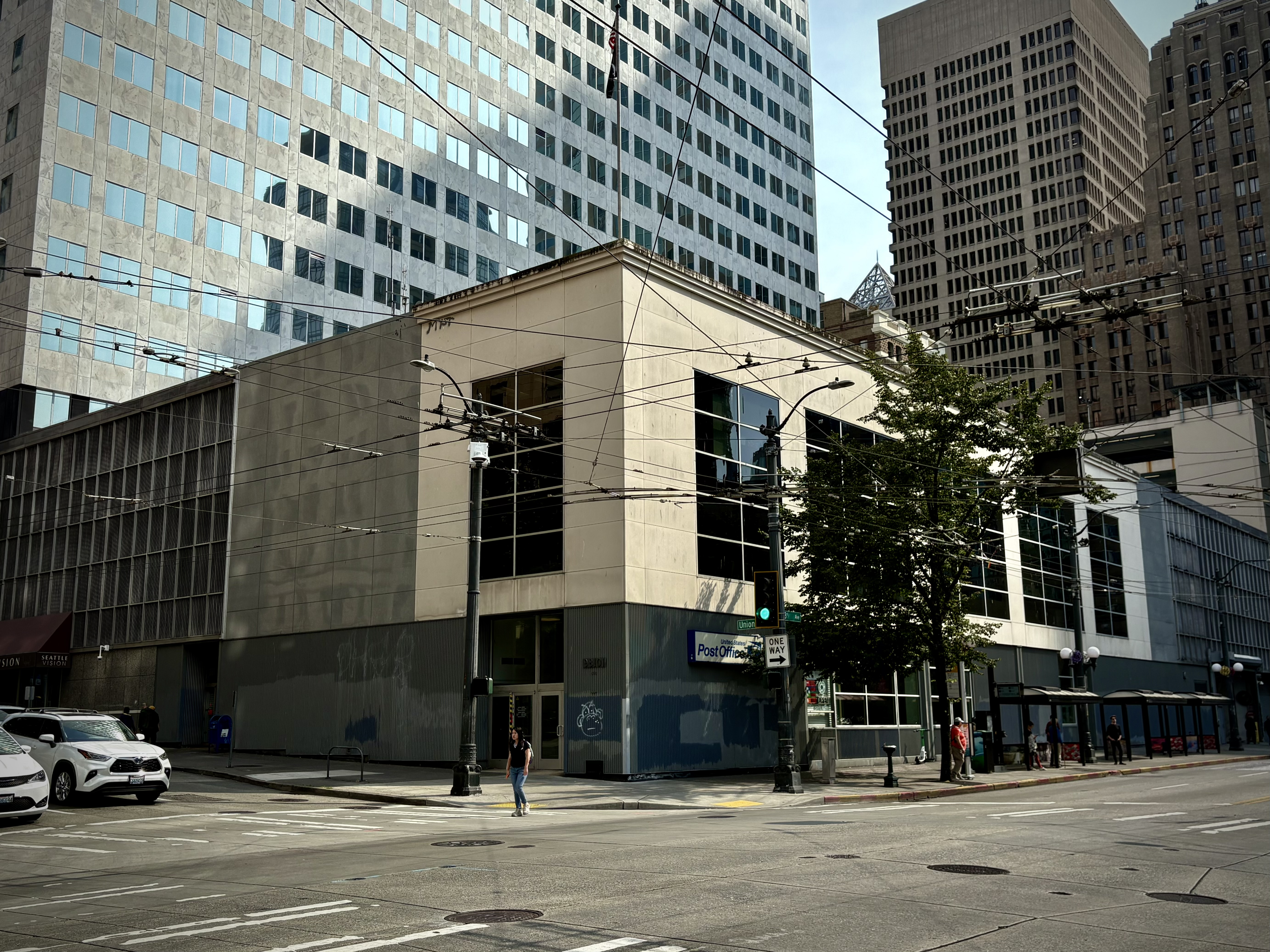
The post office building in 2025

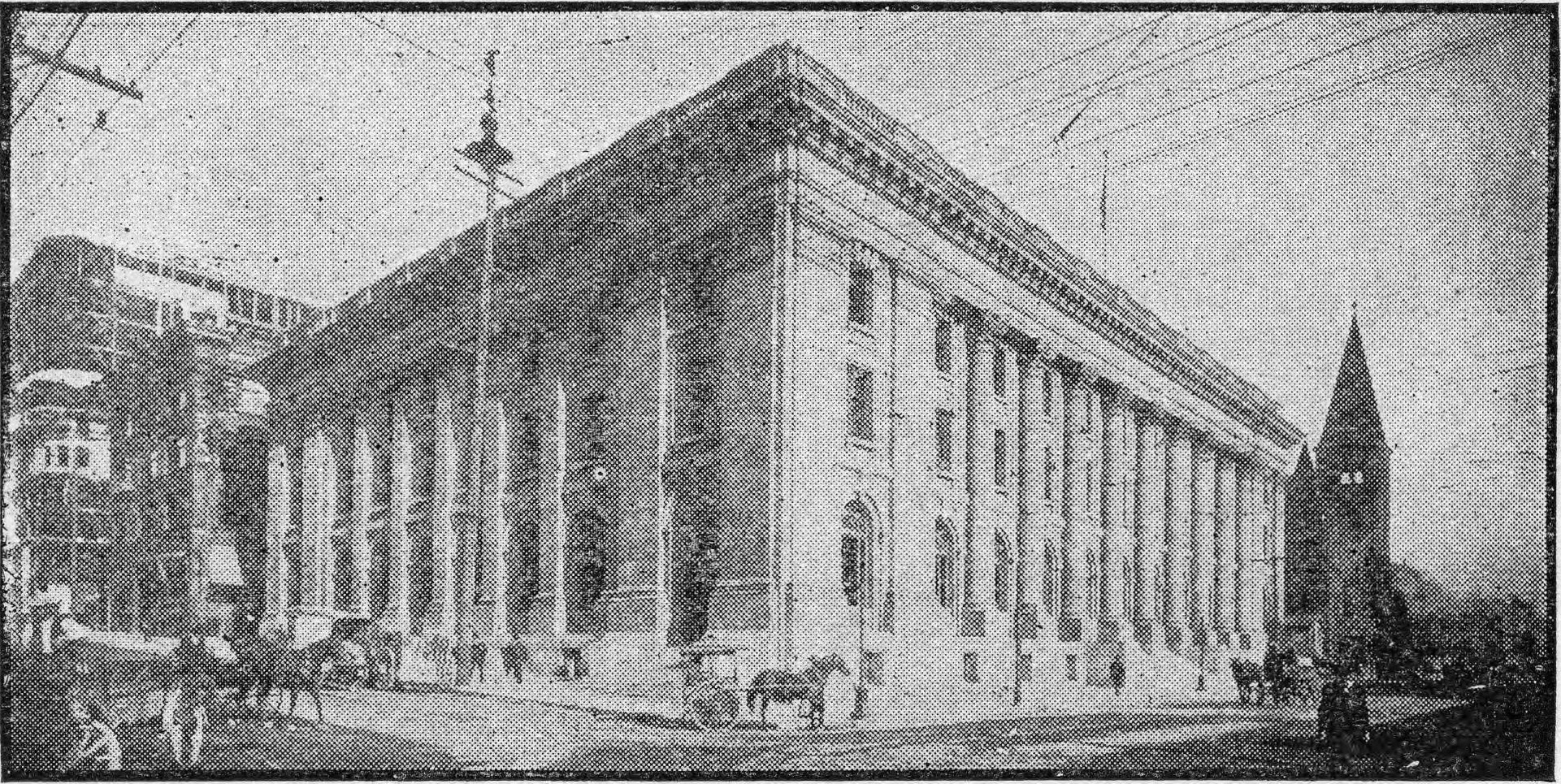
Old post office and federal office building built 1903 - 1908 and demolished 1958

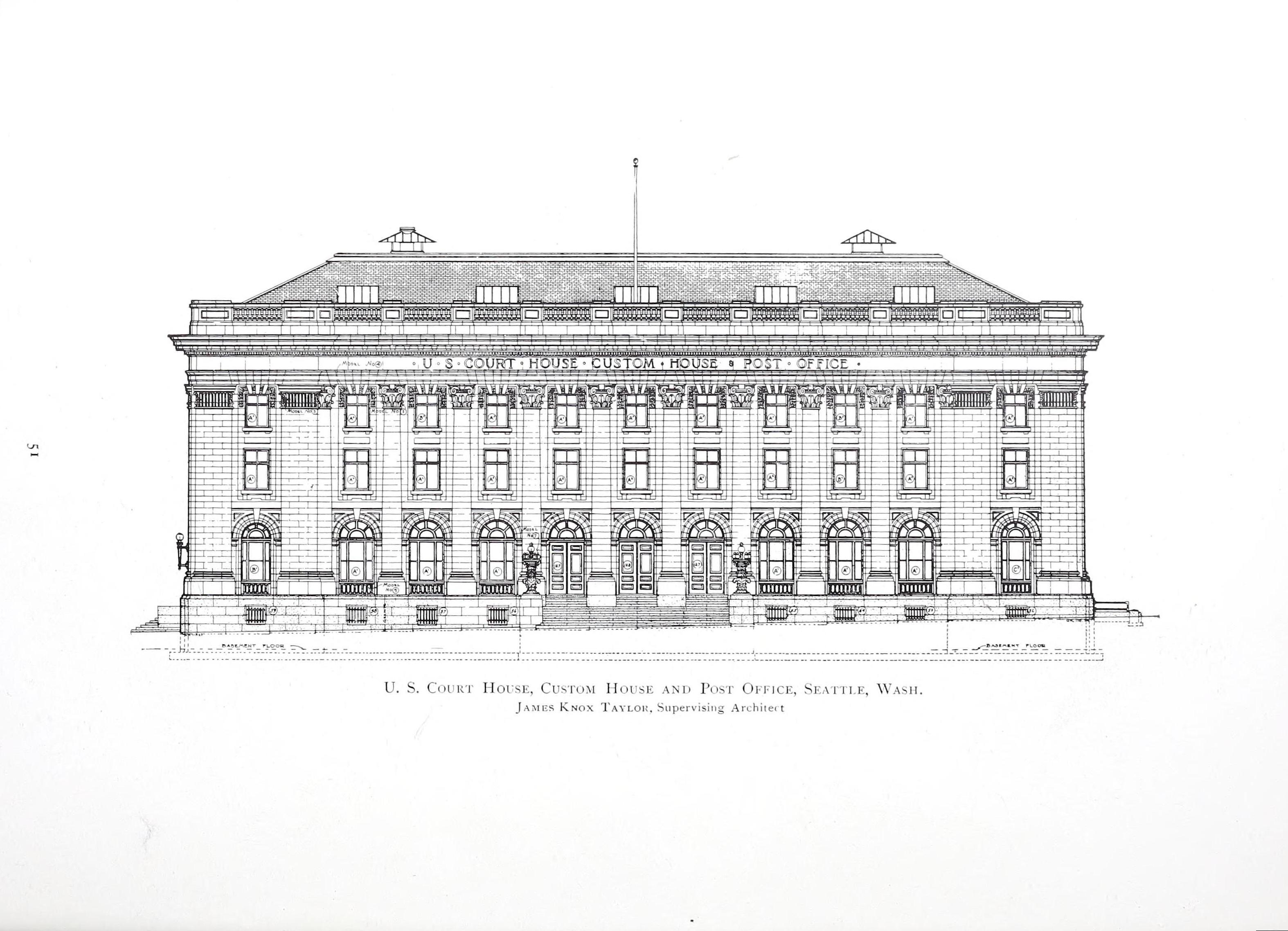

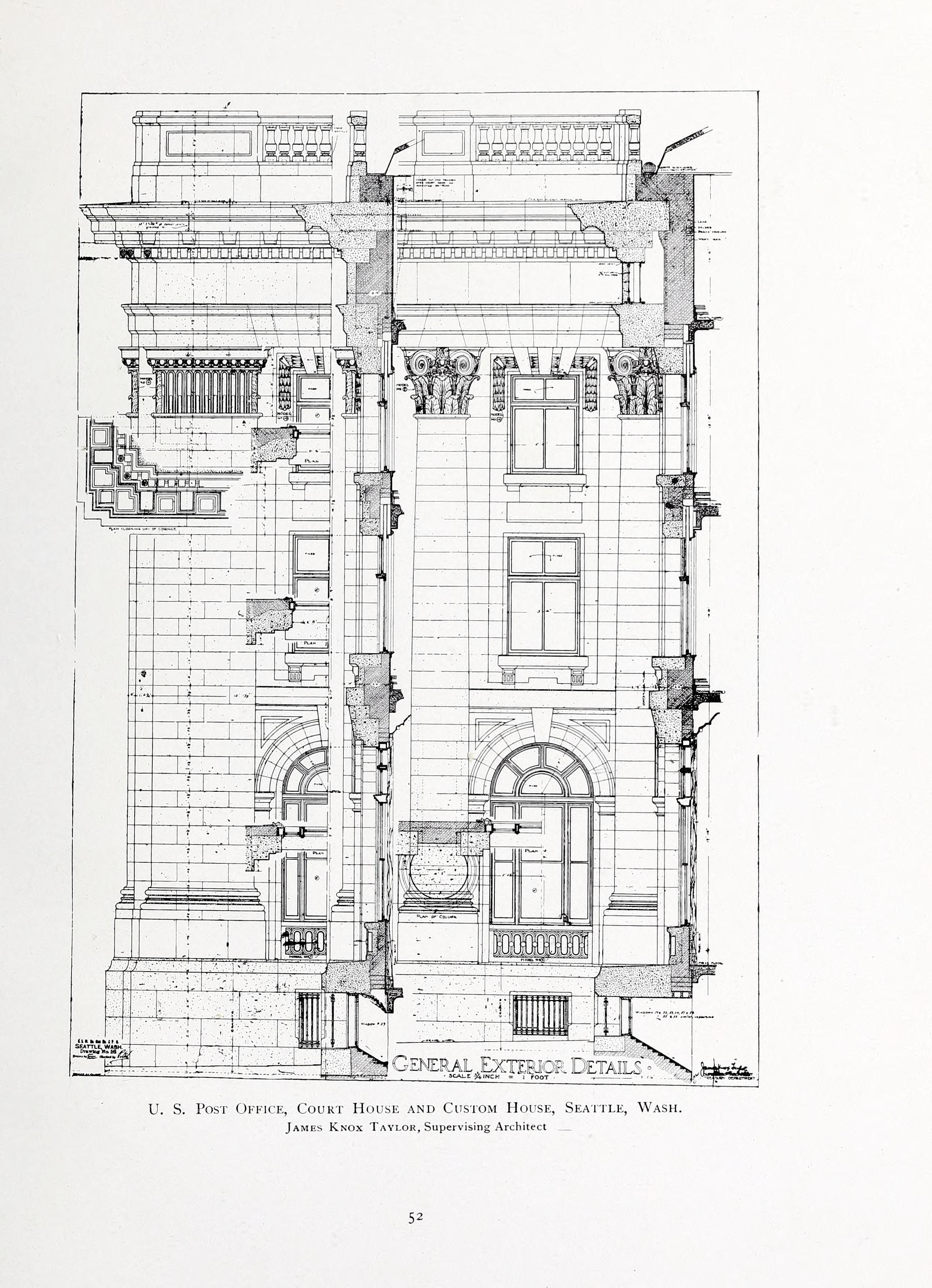

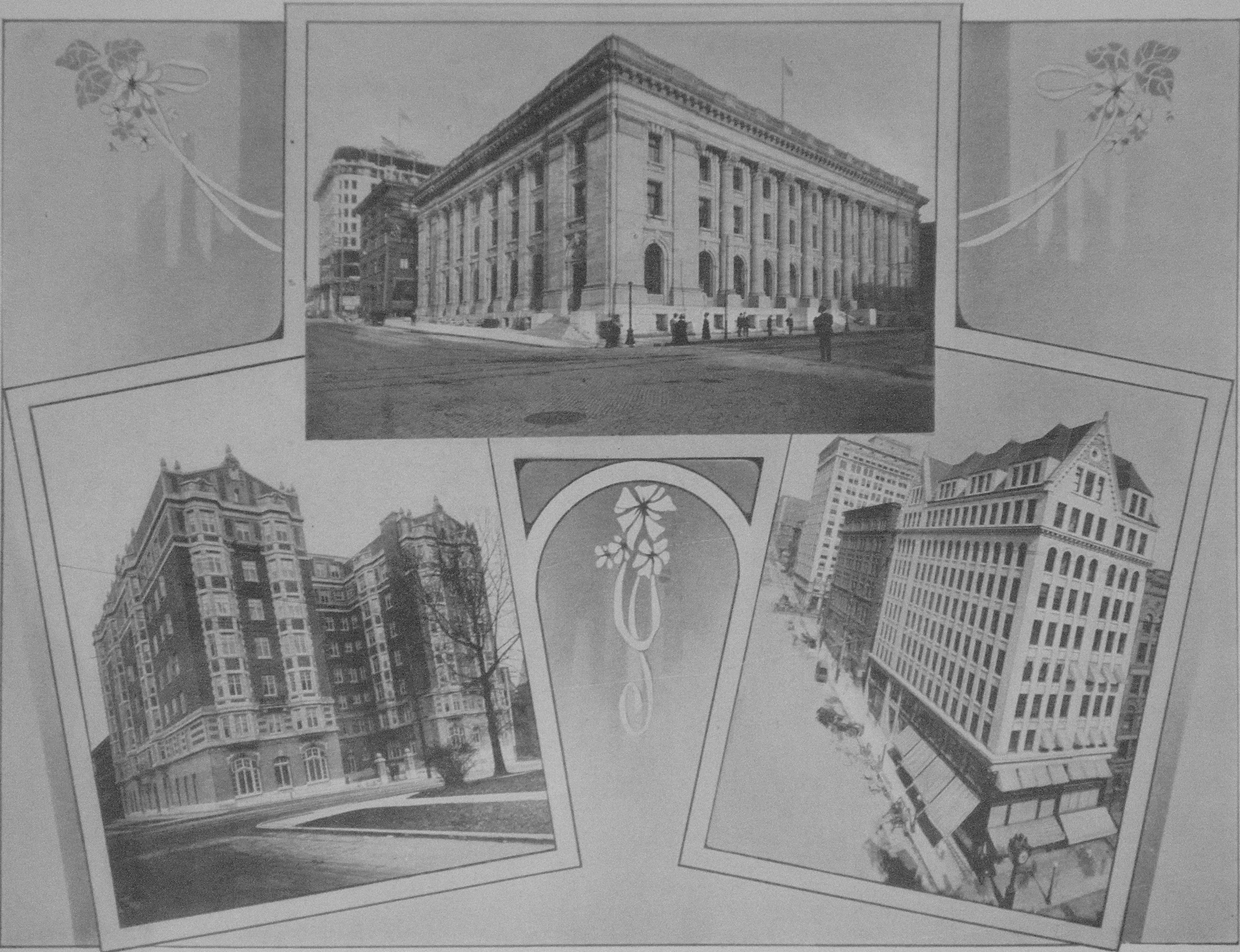
"Downtown Seattle Views", 1909

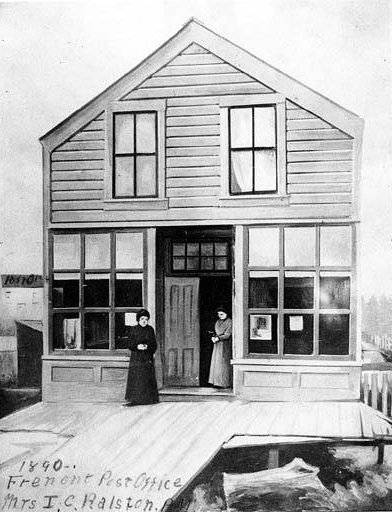
Original Post Office in Fremont

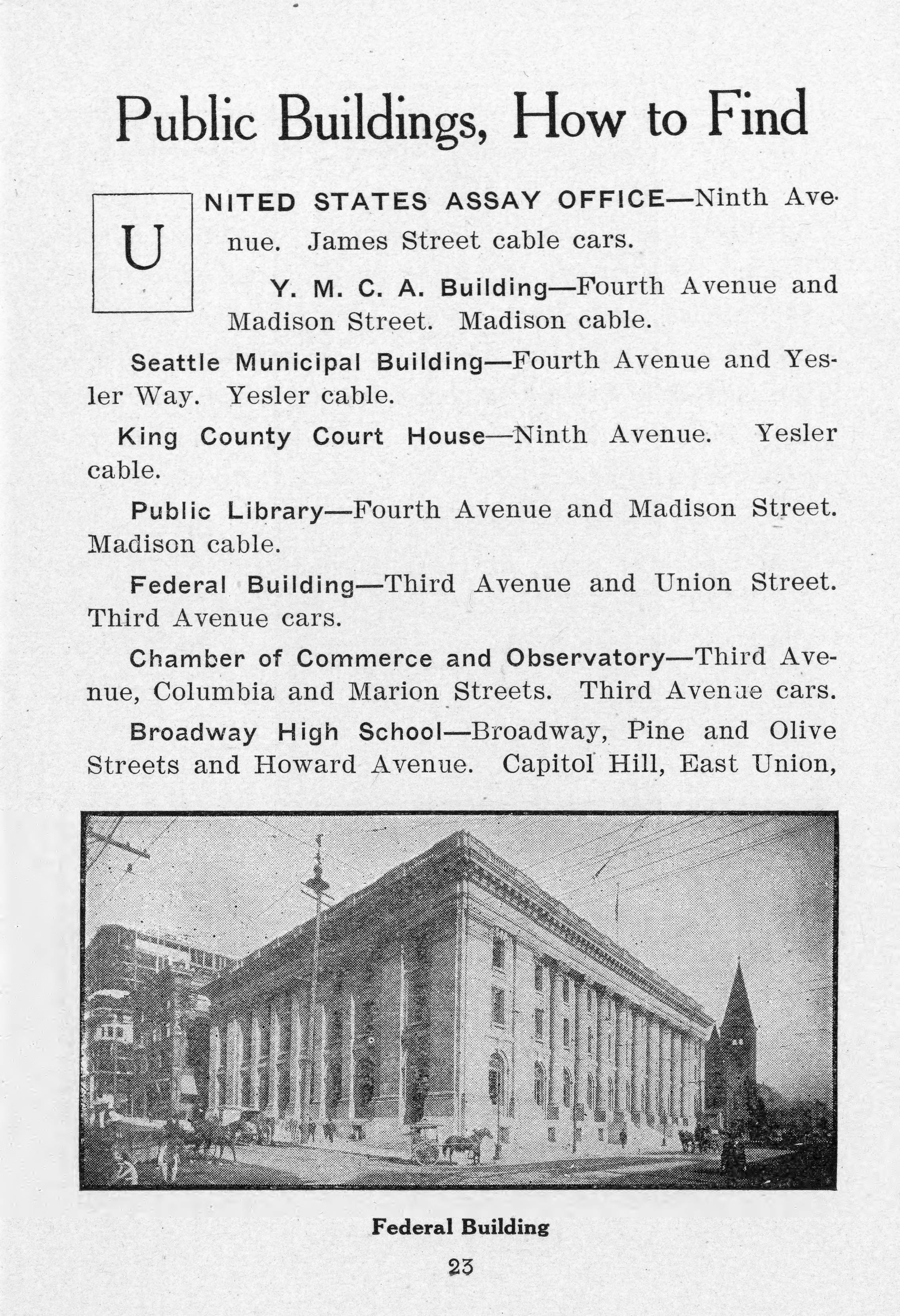

The Main Seattle Post Office refers to several successive main postal buildings in downtown Seattle, including an 1880 facility, a federal building constructed between 1903 and 1908, and the current building opened in 1959.

== History ==
=== Early post offices (1880 predecessor) ===
The first Seattle post office was built in 1880 on what is now Post Avenue or Post Alley.

=== Federal building (1903) ===
The former post office on Third Avenue and Union Street was a "grand Beaux Arts" building with Neoclassical features built from 1903 - 1908 and housed federal offices in addition to the post office. The sandstone used for its construction was porous and over several decades pollutants caused it to deteriorate. James Knox Taylor was the building's supervising architect. The building was replaced by a modern structure in 1959.

=== Current building (1959–present) ===
The current Midtown Post Office is located on the east side of 3rd Avenue between University and Union streets. It is a three-story building which measures approximately 96’ x 211’ and includes underground/basement level parking. It was designed by Naramore, Bain, Brady, and Johanson.
