= Unexpected Productions =

Coordinates: 47.6082°N 122.3402°W

Unexpected Productions (UP) is an improvisational comedy company in Seattle, Washington, USA. From their home at the Market Theater in Seattle's historic Pike Place Market, in Post Alley, Unexpected Productions produces year-round shows, teaches improv classes, and hosts the Seattle International Festival of Improvisation.

== History ==
Unexpected Productions was formed by three different improv groups as the “Seattle Theatresports League”, and was the first improv group in the US to perform Theatresports, which now holds the title of the longest running show in Seattle. By 1988, the group was exploring many additional forms of spontaneous theatre, and the name was changed to “Unexpected Productions”. In June 2008, Unexpected Productions celebrated the 25th anniversary of its first Theatresports match.

Actor Brendan Fraser is among the graduates of Unexpected Productions improv classes, and Joel McHale was a Theatresports cast member from 1993 to 1997.

== The Seattle International Festival of Improvisation ==
Unexpected Productions has, since 1997, hosted The Seattle Festival of International Improvisation. The festival gathers individual improvisers from around the world, who train together for a week long period, culminating in several performances. The festival has traditionally been held in June, around the anniversary of Unexpected Productions.

Year	Festival Theme
1993	The Seattle International Festival of Improv (No Specific Theme)
1997	All Female Cast
1999	Old Friends
2000	Get Out of your Skin
2001	Body and Soul
2002	Taking It Personally: Personal Stories, Collective Voices
2003	Stereotypes and Clichés
2004	Words, Sounds, Silence
2005	Blurred Lines
2006	Holding Up the Mirror
2007	Jazz
2008	Invisibility
2009	Zen
2010	Trinity: The Rule of Three
2011	The Fool
2012	Wabi Sabi
2013	Between You and Me: The Audience and Performer
2014	Serious Play
2015	Emergence
2016	All Around You
2017	Power

== See also ==
- Improvisational theatre
- List of improvisational theatre companies
- Gum Wall
