= Post Alley =

Street in Seattle, Washington, U.S.

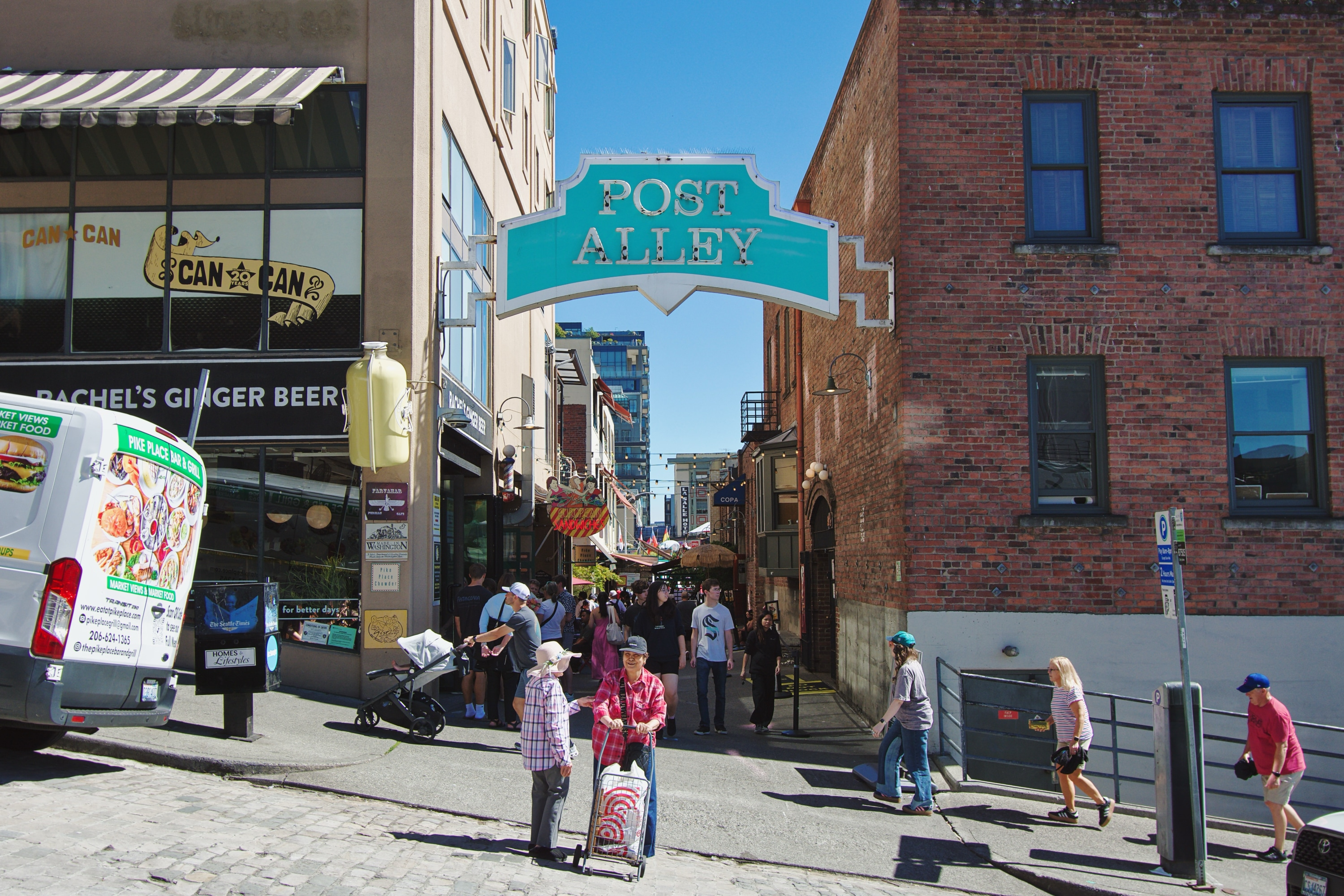
- The street in 2026

- Location within Downtown Seattle
- Length: 2,000 ft (610 m)
- Location: Seattle, Washington, U.S.
- Coordinates: 47.60760°N 122.33966°W
- North end: Virginia Street
- South end: Seneca Street

Post Alley is a short street in Seattle. The northern end of the street runs under and through Pike Place Market. The alley is mostly paved with bricks. It was called "Seattle's best-known alley for its pedestrian environment and abutting shops and restaurants" out of all 425 alleys in the city, and has been described as having a "European feel".

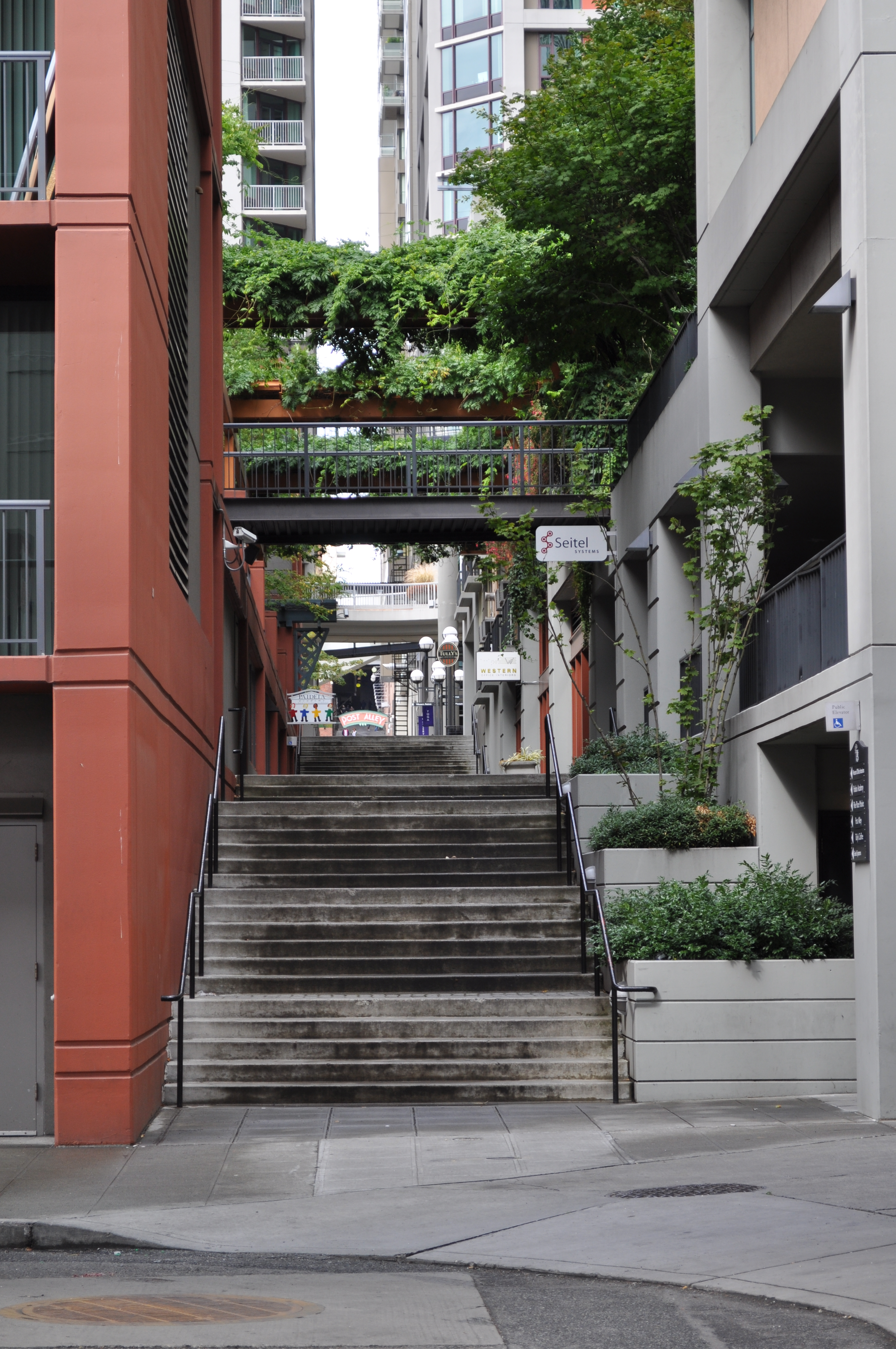
The pedestrian-only area of Post Alley at Harbor Steps

The street was originally named Post Street or Post Avenue for the first U.S. post office in Seattle, opened in 1880 on the corner of Yesler Way, which may also have been the city's first United States Government building. The alley reaches a pedestrian-only area at the Harbor Steps development a block uphill from the Seattle ferry terminal, Colman Dock.

There are notable locations on the alley including Cafe Campagne, The Pink Door, Ghost Alley Espresso, the Gum Wall, Pike Place Chowder, and Post Alley Pizza. The Federal Office Building was built on an entire city block that was bisected by Post Alley until the early 1930s. Other notable entities on still-extant Post Avenue south of the Federal Office Building include Seattle Steam Company.

== See also ==
- Main Seattle Post Office (1903, rebuilt 1959)
