= Harbor Steps =

Mixed-use development and public space in Seattle, Washington, U.S.

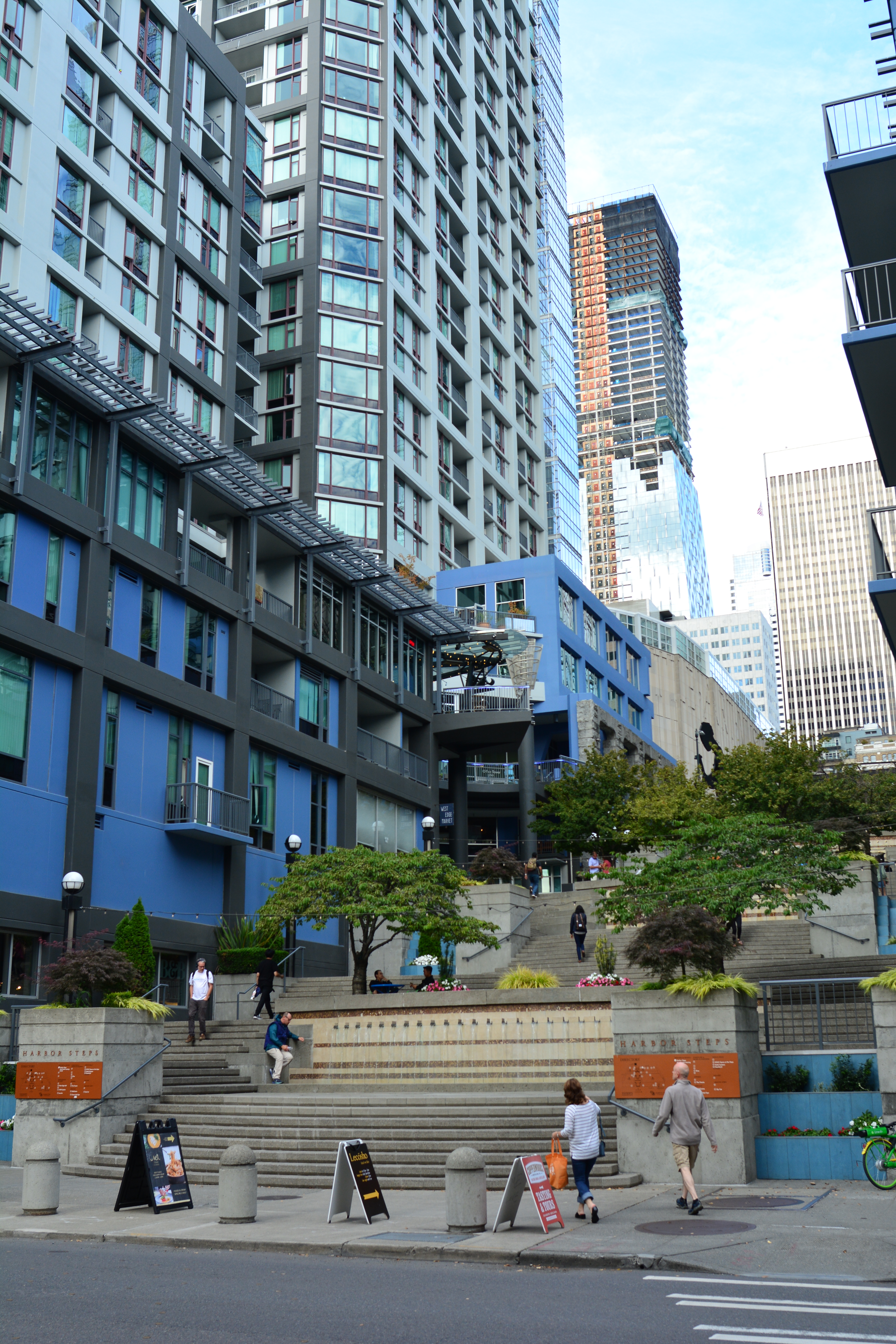
- Harbor Steps in 2019
- Location: Seattle, Washington, U.S.
- Location within Washington (state)
- Coordinates: 47.6066°N 122.3388°W

Harbor Steps (sometimes called Harbor Steps Park) is a mixed-use development and public space connecting Seattle's Central Waterfront and downtown, in the U.S. state of Washington.

== Description ==
Harbor Steps has a large outdoor staircase, as well as condominiums, hotels, offices, and retail spaces. The stairway connects First Avenue and Western Avenue, and has two fountains and plants. A pedestrian-only section of Post Alley runs through the center of the Steps, which have been described as "Seattle's version of Rome's Spanish steps".

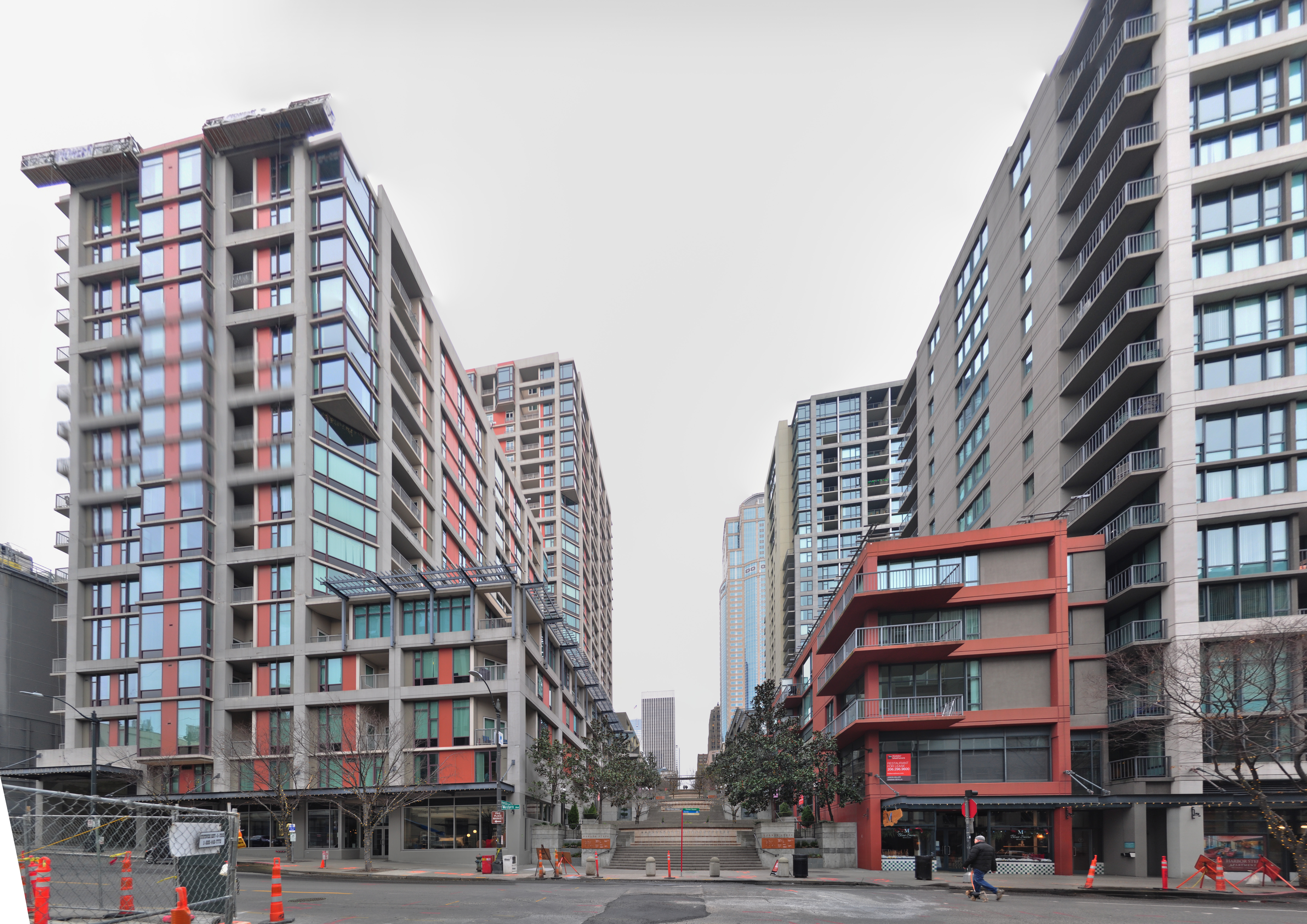
2016

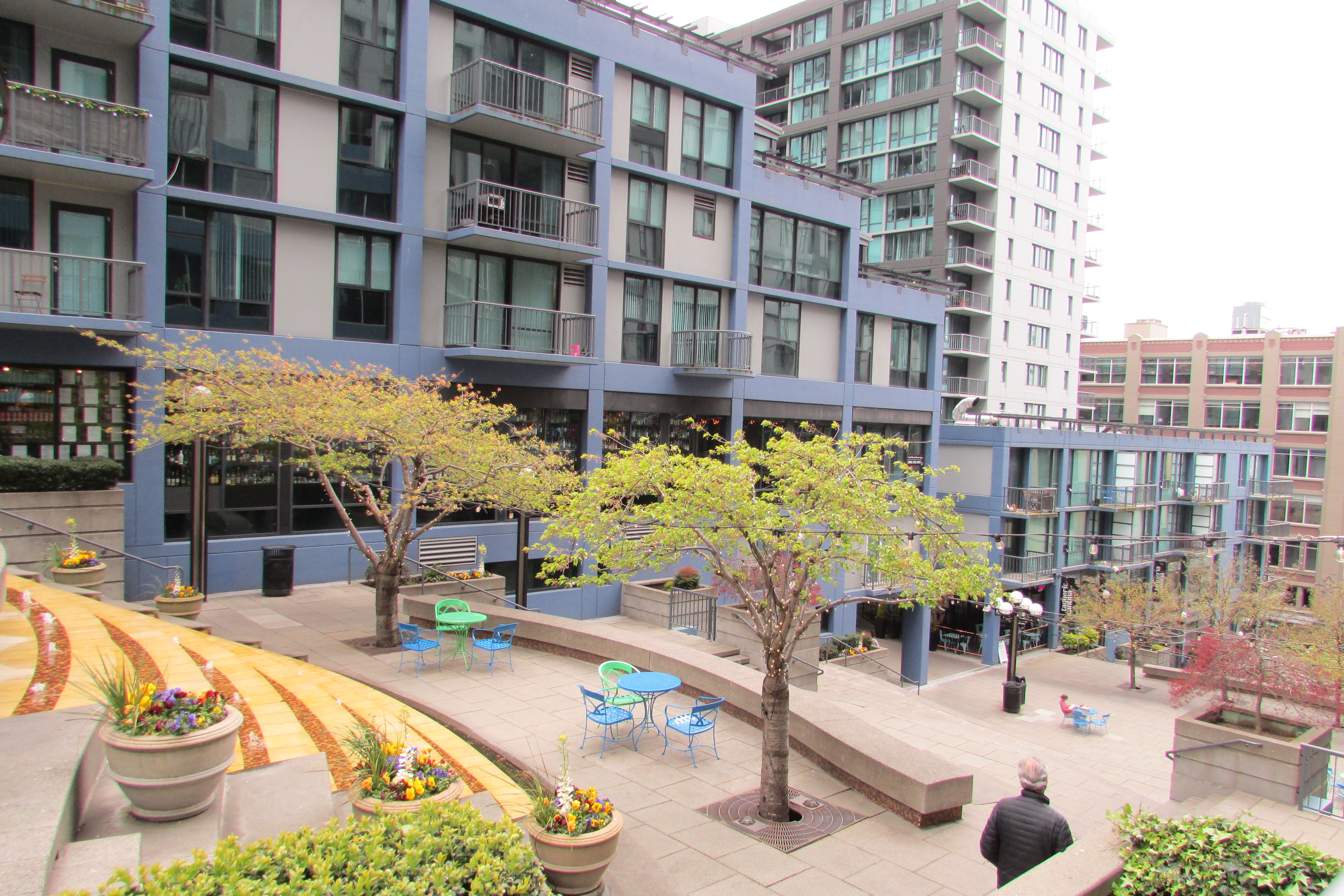
2023

== History ==
The concept for Harbor Steps was conceived during the 1980s, and development and construction took place from 1990 to 2006. In the 2020s, the thoroughfare was renovated, reopening in 2024.

Businesses that have operated at Harbor Steps include Dough Zone, Lecosho, Skillet, and Taqueria Cantina.

The Harbor Steps Apartments appear in the 2002 film The Ring. Fodor's has recommended the Harbor Steps for people watching.

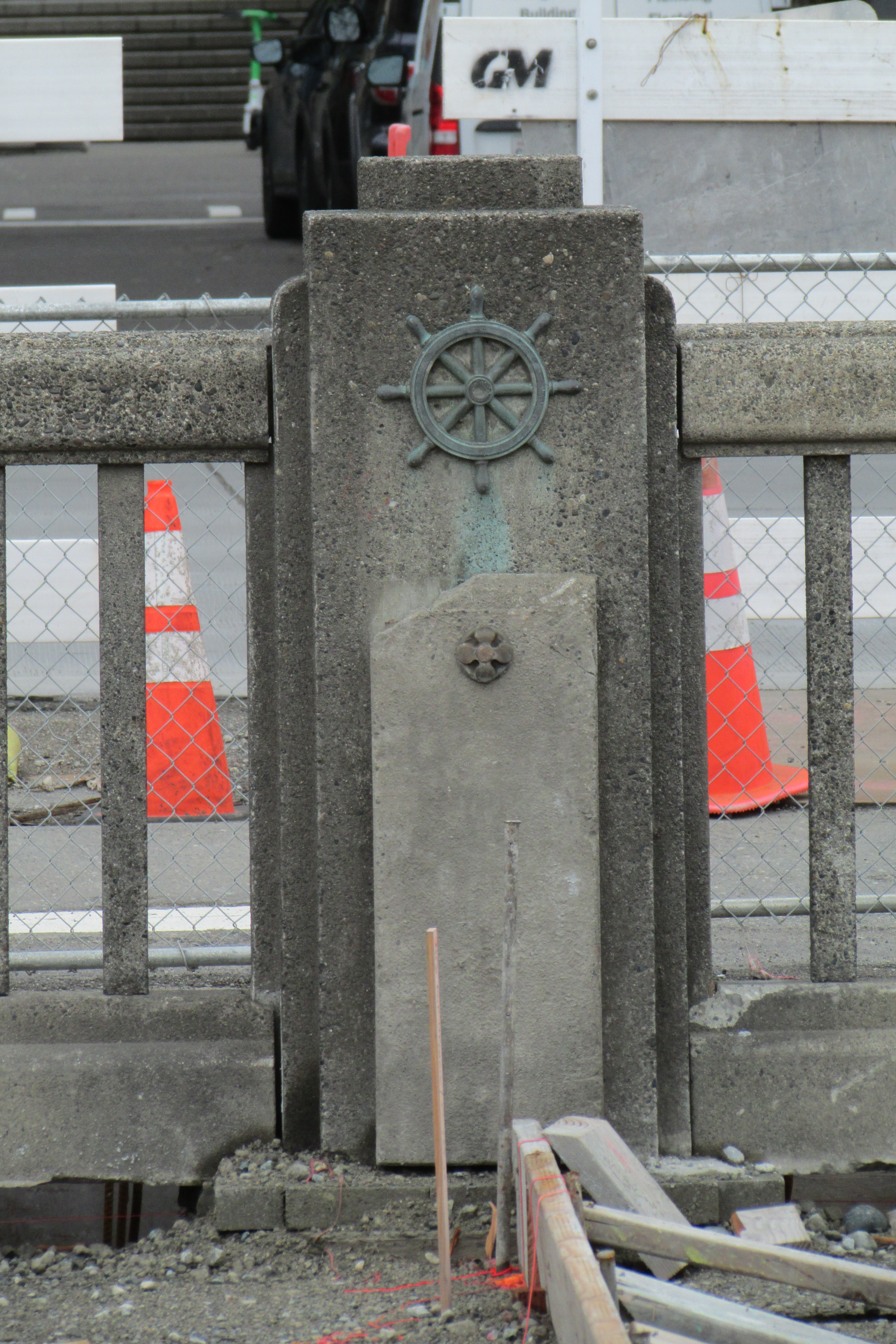
Concrete railing, 2023

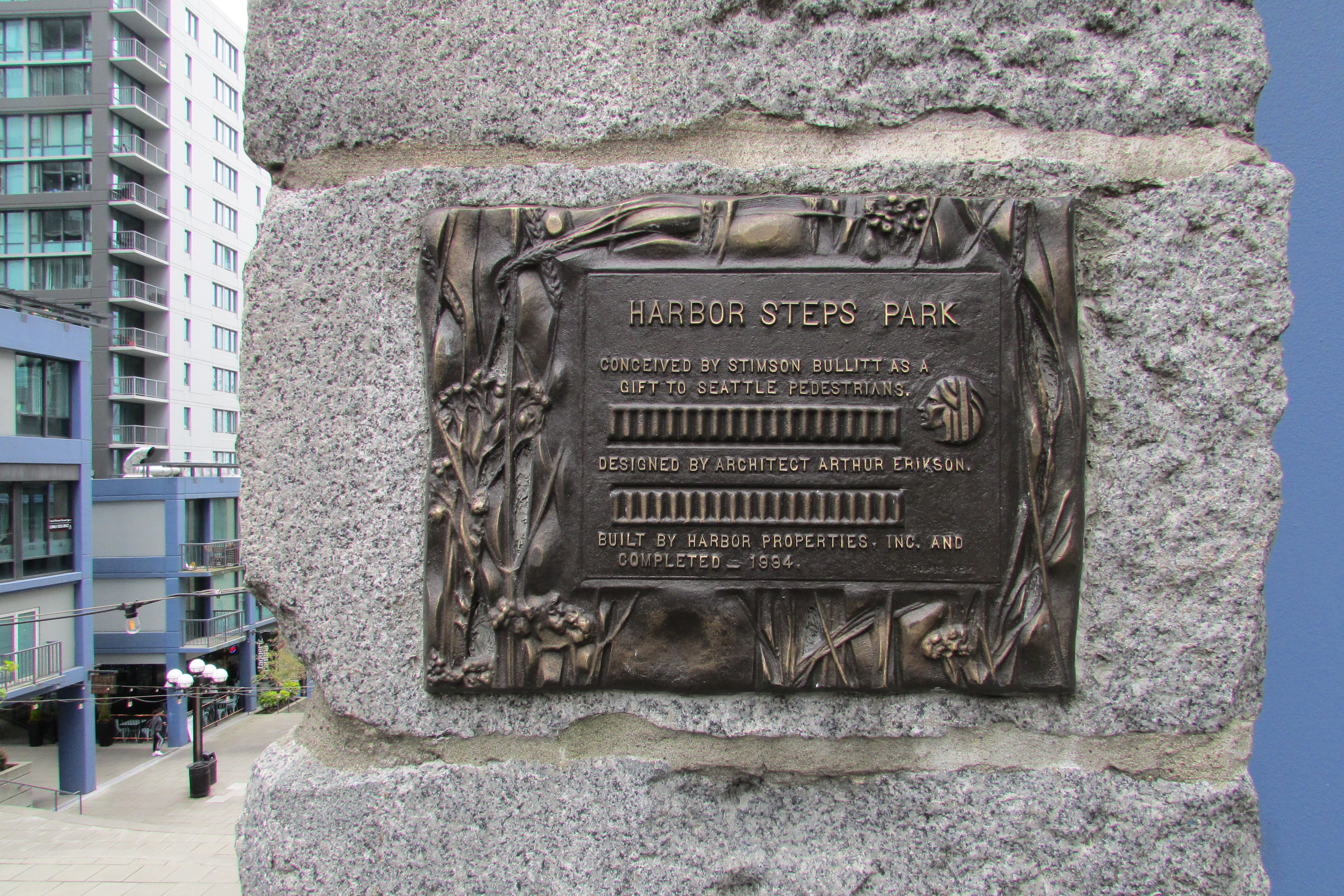
Plaque, 2023

== See also ==
- Spanish Steps (Tacoma, Washington)
- Public stairways in Seattle
