= Gum Wall =

Tourist attraction in Seattle, Washington

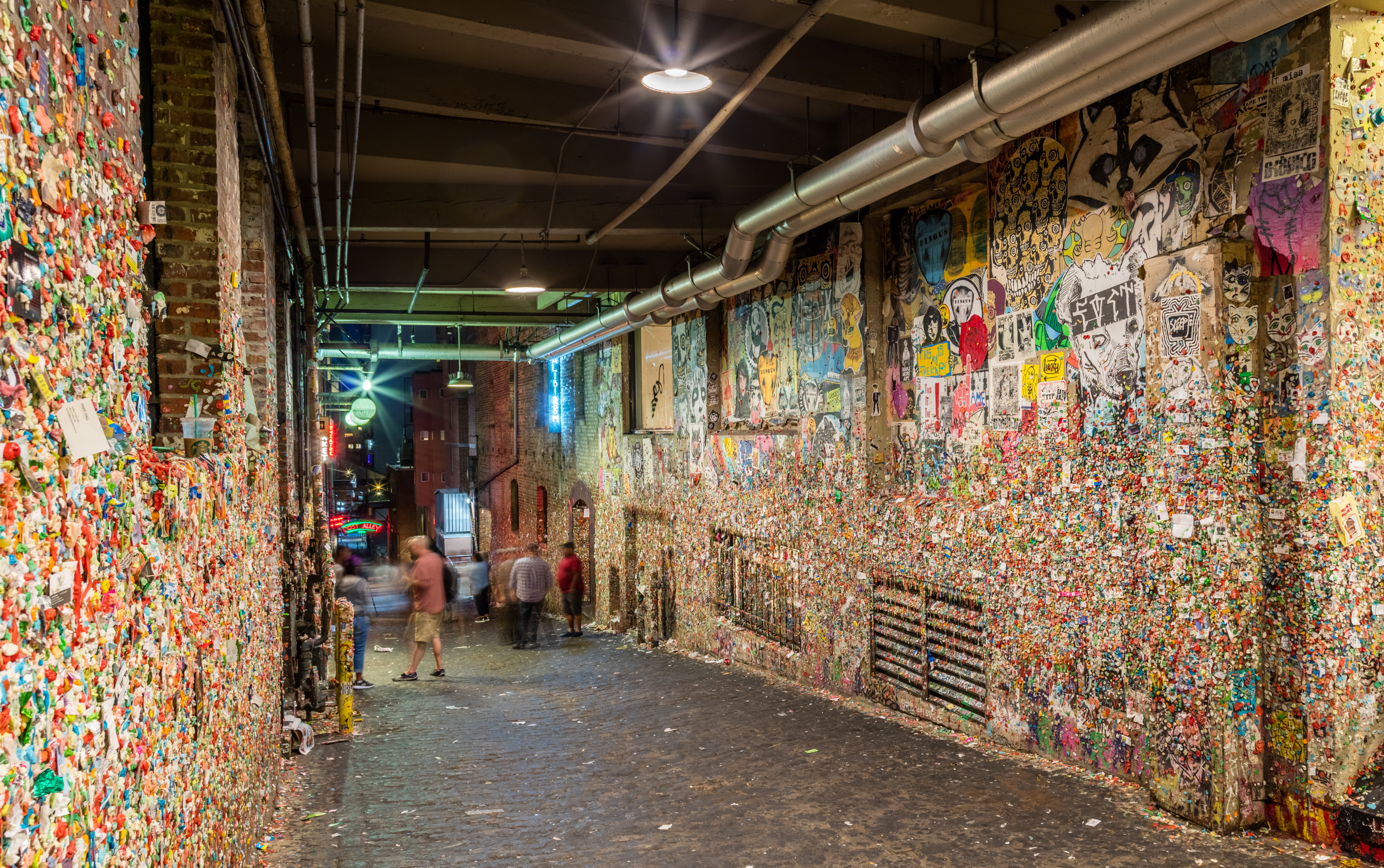
- General view in 2017
- Surface: Chewing gum
- Location: Post Alley, Seattle, Washington, U.S.
- Location within Washington (state)
- Coordinates: 47°36′30″N 122°20′25″W

The Gum Wall is a brick wall situated beneath Pike Place Market in Seattle, Washington, United States. Located on Post Alley near Pike Street, south of the market's main entrance off 1st Avenue, the wall is covered with used chewing gum. This accumulation on the walls measures several inches in thickness, reaching a height of 15 feet (4.6 m) along a 50-foot (15 m) section. It originated inadvertently around the Market Theater in the 1990s and later evolved into a tourist attraction and local landmark. Since 2015, the gum wall has been regularly cleaned to prevent erosion of the brick walls.

== History ==
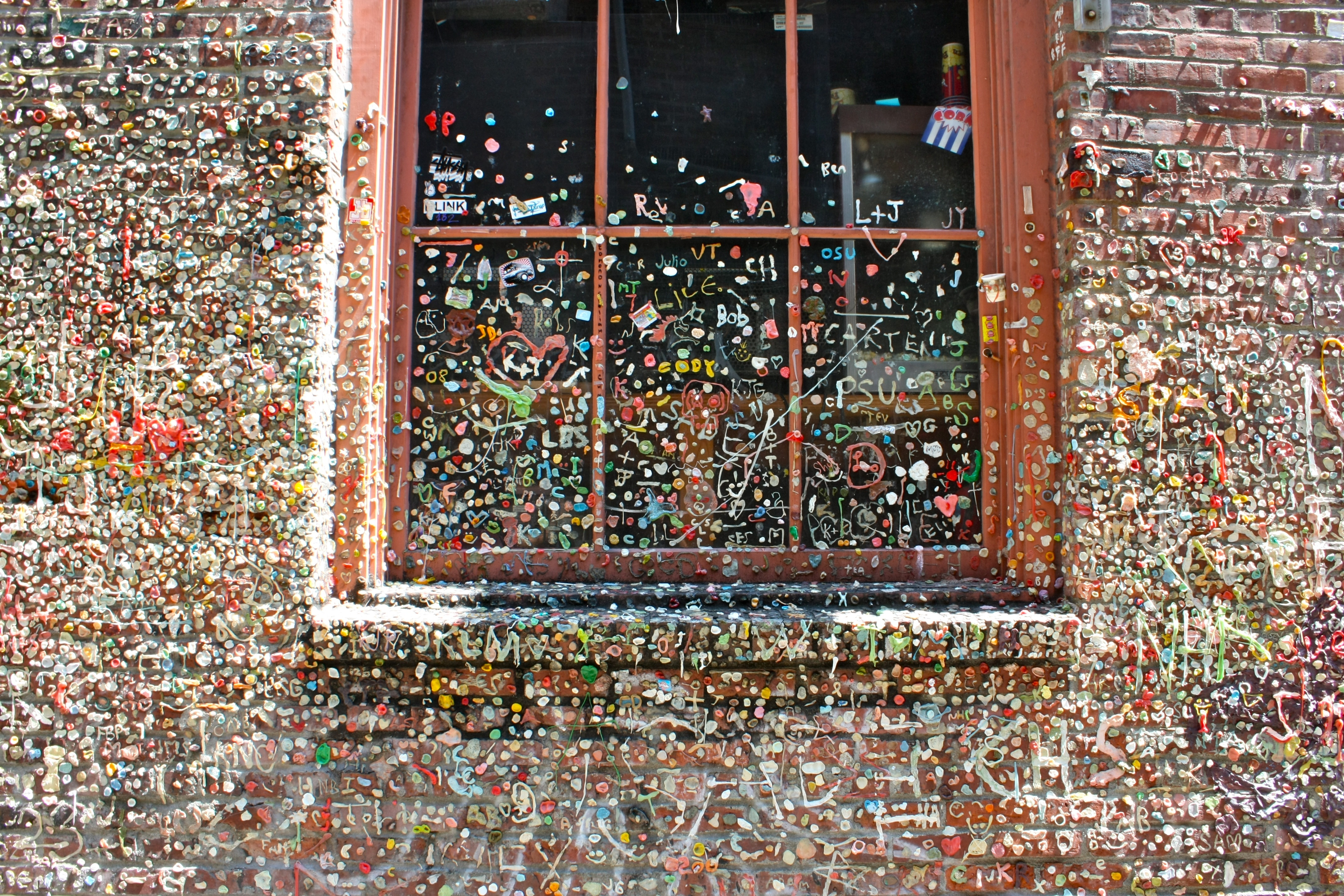
The Market Theater Gum Wall in 2009

The wall is located in Post Alley adjacent to the box office for the Market Theater, a venue for comedy shows and other small performances. After it became the host of Unexpected Productions' Theatresports in 1991, the theater's walls were covered by patrons' pieces of used gum that had pennies pushed into them. The coins were later removed, but the gum remained amid several cleanings of the walls under orders from the Pike Place Market Preservation and Development Authority. The market's officials reversed course and allowed the gum wall to stay, deeming it to be a tourist attraction around 1999.

By the late 2000s, the gum wall had grown to 50 feet (15 m) long and included pieces as high as 20 feet (6.1 m). Some contributors to the gum wall arranged their pieces to create small works of art. As of 2024, the gum wall is 54 feet (16 m) long and 8 feet (2.4 m) high, with an estimated density of 180 pieces of gum per brick.

=== Cleanings ===
On November 3, 2015, the Pike Place Market Preservation & Development Authority announced that the wall would be fully cleaned for the first time in 20 years. The steam cleaning and maintenance was intended to prevent further erosion of the bricks on the walls from the sugar in the gum. Prior to this, it had only ever been spot-cleaned in areas where gum had been placed in prohibited areas. In response to online posts, Pike Place Market officials launched a photo contest, encouraging fans to share their personal photos and memories of the wall online.

Work began on November 10 and took 130 hours to complete, with over 2,350 pounds (1,070 kg) of gum removed and disposed of. The work was contracted to a local company and cost about $4,000. The temperature of the steam machines reached up to 280 °F (138 °C), delaminating the gum pieces and ensuring that the low pressure would not harm the bricks. The discarded gum was then sent to a normal landfill rather than composted.

After the cleaning was finished, gum began to be re-added to the wall almost immediately, as there were no preventative measures to prohibit sticking gum to the newly cleaned wall. Some of the new additions were memorials to the November 2015 Paris attacks. The gum wall was cleaned again in September 2018 and November 2024.

== Recognition ==
It was named one of the top 5 "germiest" tourist attractions in 2009, second to the Blarney Stone. The Washington state governor, Jay Inslee, said it is his "favorite thing about Seattle you can't find anywhere else". The Gum Wall is located at the start of the Ghost Tour, and also a popular site with wedding photographers. Oftentimes, visitors create declarations of love out of gum, making for a comparison of the gum wall to other romantic spots such as the Pont des Art in Paris.

== Criticism ==
Some argue that the gum wall encourages litter as visitors usually stick items like cigarette butts or gum wrappers along the wall. There were also prior complaints that the gum was being tracked into nearby businesses and that it attracts rats in the alley. Bars and restaurants situated across from the attraction attempted to prevent gum from reaching their properties by displaying signs with the message "No Gum", but this strategy proved ineffective.

Because modern chewing gum is made from synthetic polymers, discarded gum contributes to plastic pollution and the spread of microplastics in the environment.

== As art ==
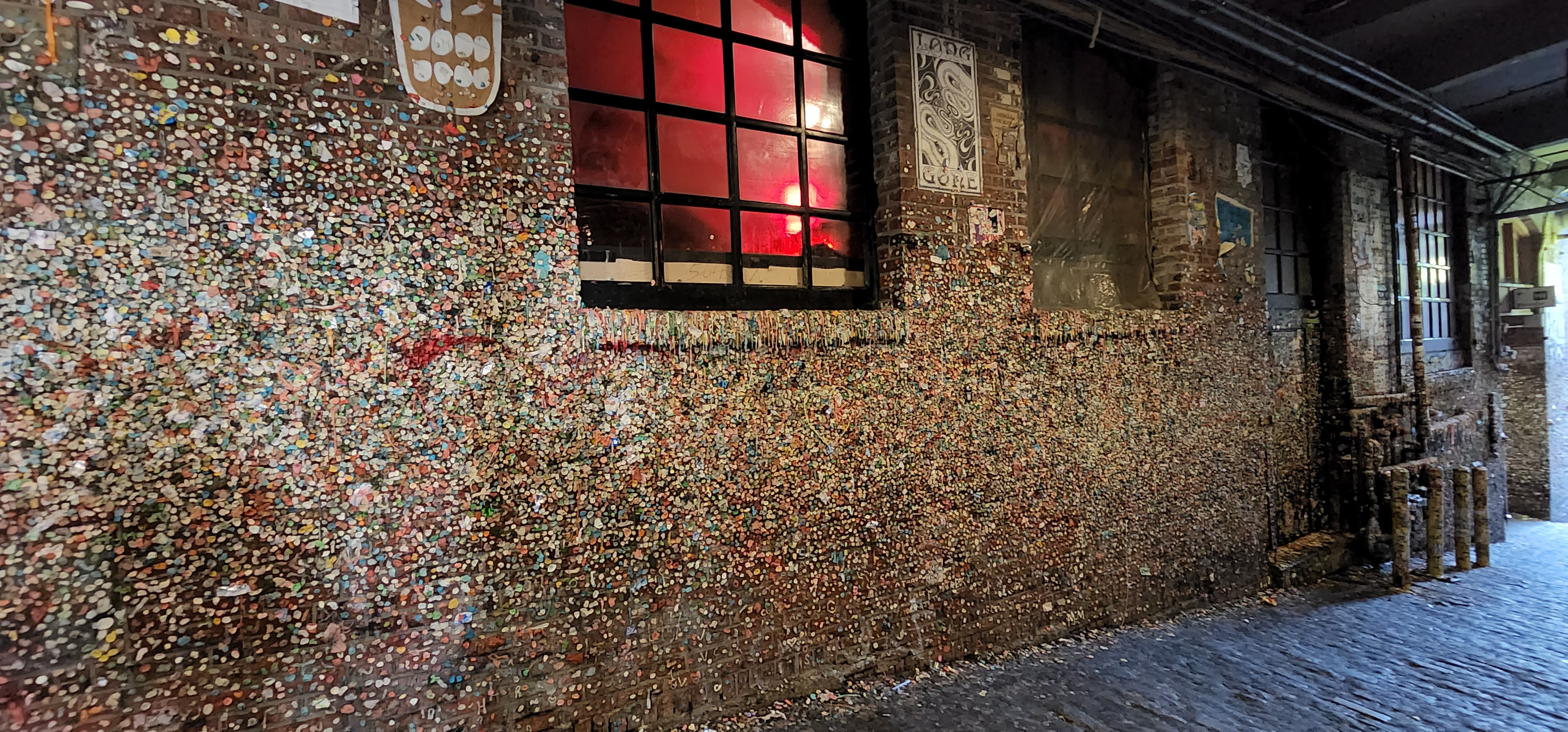
Gum Wall in April 2022

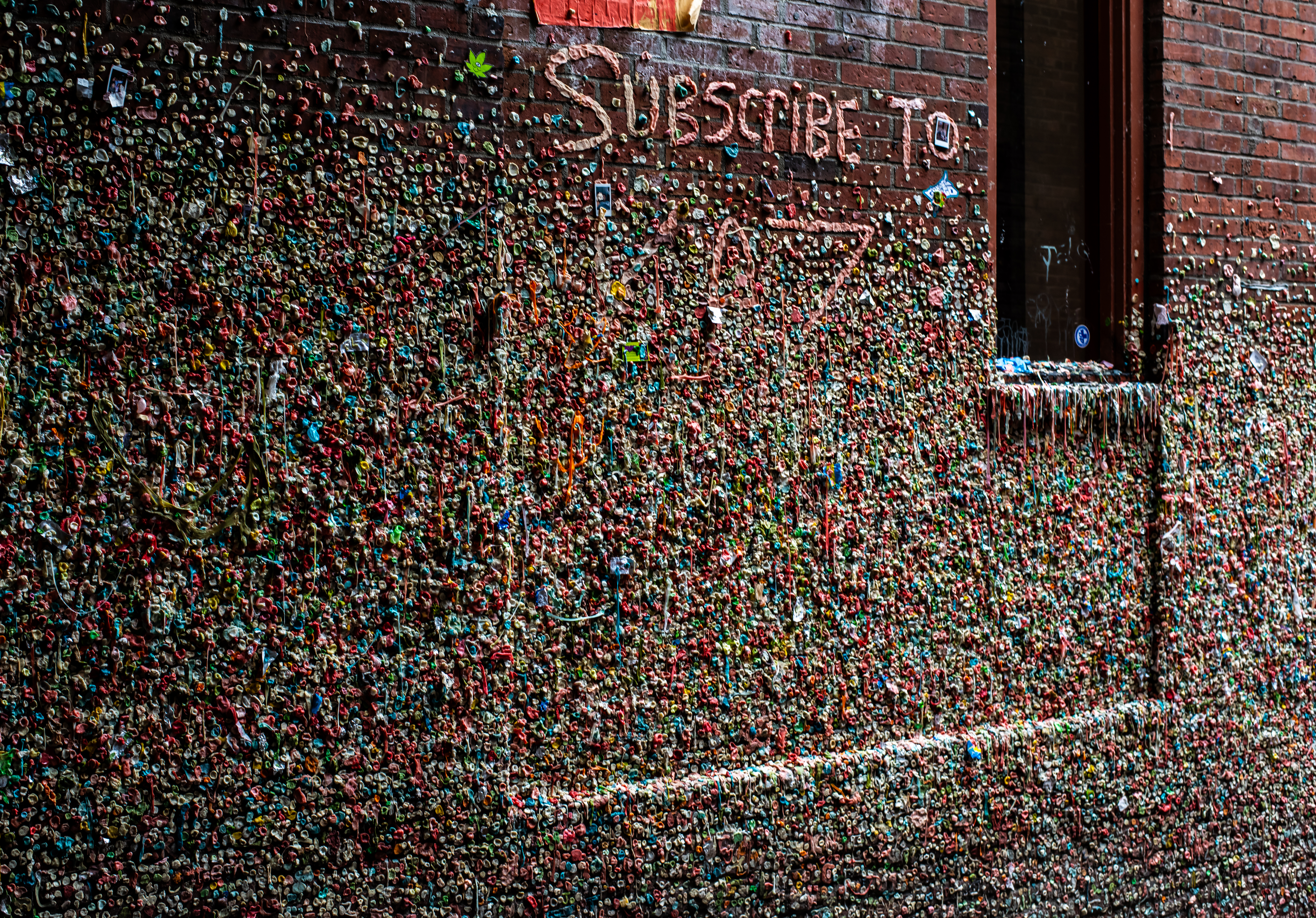
Gum Wall in November 2025

Although officials of the Pike Place Market defined the concern about the gum affecting the brick wall, some may see the participation in sticking up the substance as attributing to collective action. Many may classify the spot as a 'collective art' piece, where something colloquially bad has been transformed into artwork. The wall is also usually decorated with physical copies of some artists' work that they stick up. Given that the wall is rarely cleaned, many practice graffiti art on spots where there is less gum and more visibility.

In January 2024, local artist Rudy Willingham chewed 200 pieces of gum to create a mural of Pete Carroll on the wall shortly after he departed as head coach of the Seattle Seahawks. Carroll had been known for chewing up to 130 pieces of gum on gamedays; the 2-foot (0.61 m) mural depicts him wearing a headset and is made of solid colors.

== See also ==
- Bubblegum Alley
