= Federal Office Building (Seattle) =

Historic building in Seattle, Washington, United States

- U.S. National Register of Historic Places
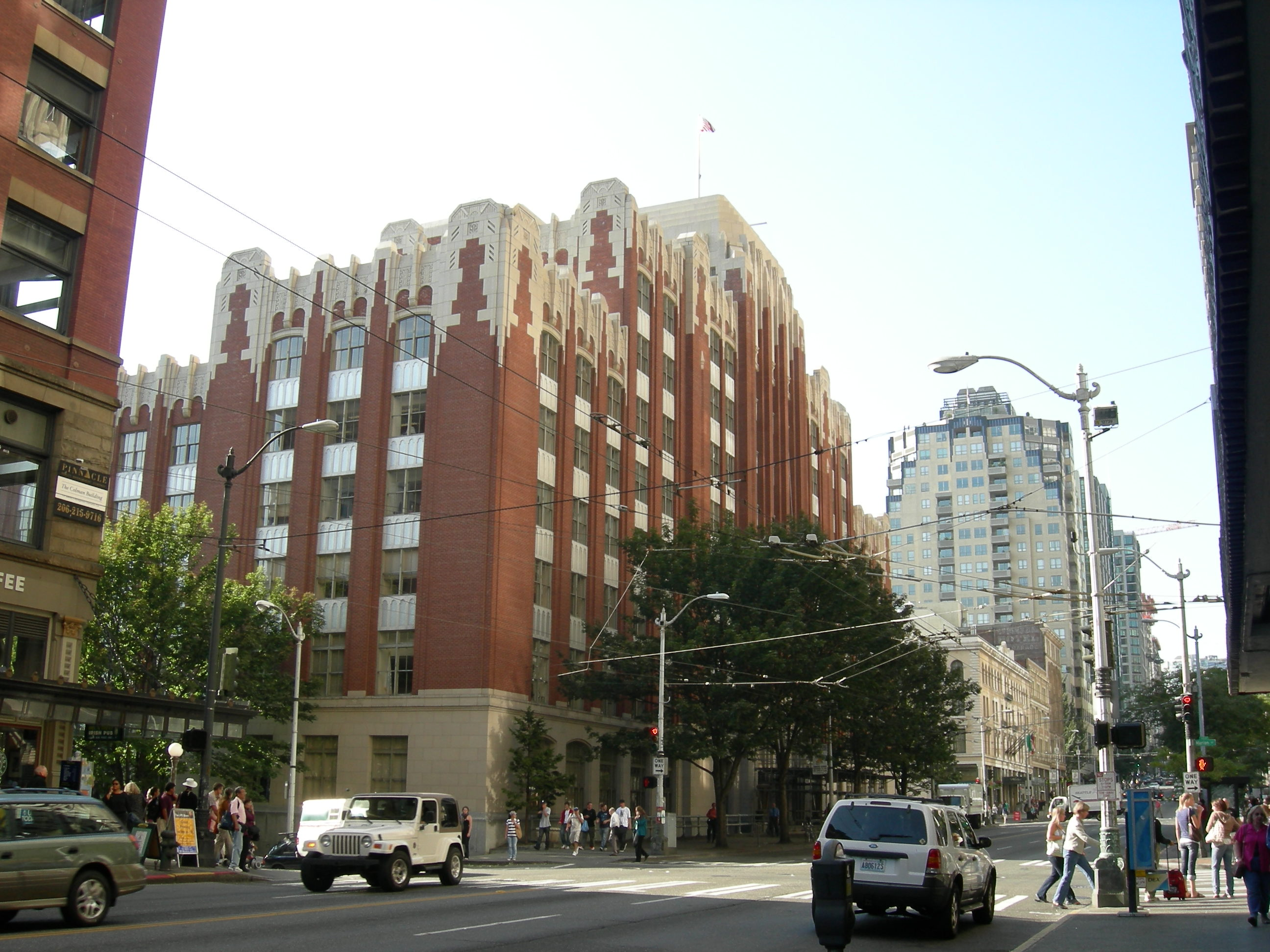
- Old Federal Building, September 2007

- Location within Downtown Seattle
- Location: 909 1st Ave., Seattle, Washington
- Coordinates: 47°36′16″N 122°20′6″W
- Area: 1.2 acres (0.49 ha)
- Built: 1932
- Architect: Office of the Supervising Architect under James A. Wetmore
- Architectural style: Art Deco, Modernistic
- NRHP reference No.: 79003155
- Added to NRHP: April 30, 1979

The Federal Office Building, Seattle, Washington is a historic federal office building located at Seattle in King County, Washington.

== Building history ==
According to local tradition, the Federal Office Building in Seattle is located on the site where city founders A. A. Denny, William Bell, and C. D. Boren docked their boat after making initial surveys of Puget Sound and its harbors in 1851. By the late 1880s, the block had been built up with 1 and 2-story shops and lodging houses, all wood-frame. On June 6, 1889, the Great Seattle Fire, which destroyed more than 64 acres (260,000 m^{2}) of the commercial district, started in a cabinet shop at the site of the Federal Office Building.

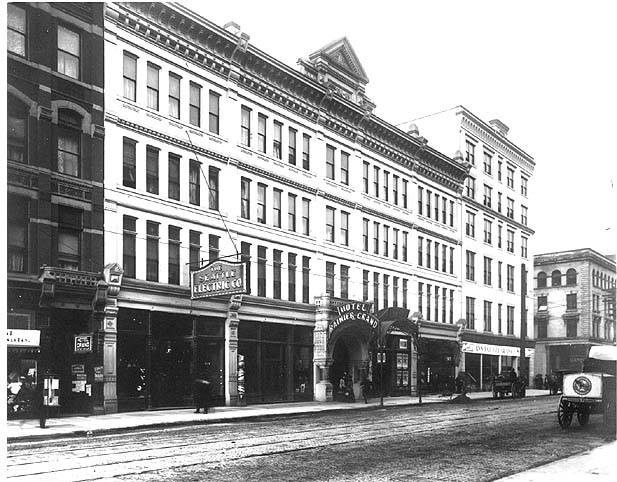
The Rainier Grand Hotel and annex circa 1905

The block was quickly rebuilt with a wall of 4-story buildings including the massive Noyes Block, occupied by the Grand Hotel, later known as the Rainier Grand. After the fire downtown Seattle took on a much more metropolitan air, and in 1897 its port became the "Gateway to Alaska" for steamships bearing prospectors bound for Alaska and the Klondike Gold Rush. The city's population burgeoned, and the federal government decided to consolidate the location of its services. In 1928, Congress approved more than $2 million for site acquisition and construction. Officials selected a site bounded by Madison and Marion streets and First and Western avenues. The building was designed between 1930 and 1931 by the Office of the Supervising Architect under James A. Wetmore. One of the earliest federal buildings in the Art Deco style of architecture, the building's design was a departure from the more traditional styles of Classical Revival and Beaux Arts Classicism and a step toward more modern architectural styles that were gaining popularity. However, the building retains conventional symmetrical massing and proportion.

Construction was completed in 1933 by the Murch Construction Company of St. Louis, Missouri. The building used substantial amounts of aluminum from smelters along the nearby Columbia River. It was the first building in Seattle designed specifically to house offices for the federal government. Among its first tenants were 52 federal agencies, the largest of which was the Department of the Treasury.

Today, the building is located among three significant historic areas: Pioneer Square, Pike Place Market, and the waterfront. The Henry M. Jackson Federal Building, located across the street, was constructed from 1975 to 1976. In 1979, the Federal Office Building was listed in the National Register of Historic Places.

== Architecture ==
The Federal Office Building is an exuberant example of Art Deco architecture. One of the earliest Modern styles, Art Deco architecture emphasizes verticality and is heavily ornamented with stylized, geometric motifs. The facade is stepped, with the outer portions rising from six stories to nine stories, while the central tower reaches eleven stories in height. The tower is topped by a ziggurat (stepped pyramid) with a flagpole at its apex. Corner towers rise slightly above the ridgeline.

The building is constructed of a steel frame encased in concrete for additional fire protection. The design is also notable for its use of aluminum, which was installed as cast spandrel panels between windows on the third through sixth floors. The panels, which depict either insignia of various federal agencies or decorative geometric designs, were one of the earliest substantial uses of aluminum on a West Coast building.

The building rests atop a granite foundation. Smooth terracotta, which lends the appearance of stone, covers the first story and is punctuated by segmental-arch openings on the facade. The midsection is clad in light red brick and is topped by elaborate stylized ornamentation executed in pale terra cotta.

On the facade, three centrally located entrances are articulated by vertical pale terra-cotta ornamentation that includes miniature ram and lion heads. A stylized eagle motif is centrally placed above the entrance, and bronze lanterns provide light. Two five-foot-tall, cast-bronze urns, which were relocated from the 1909 Alaska–Yukon–Pacific Exposition, flank the entrance. They feature stylized geometric decorations.

Often, the rear elevations of buildings are less visible and therefore less ornamented, but because the rear of the Federal Office Building faces Western Avenue, an important thoroughfare, all elevations are extensively detailed. The building's cornerstone and two plaques commemorating the Great Seattle Fire of 1889 are located near where the fire began.

Interior public spaces are heavily ornamented with Art Deco materials and motifs. Access is gained through the First Avenue entrance into a vestibule with cast-bronze moldings and bronze-and-glass doors which lead to a public lobby and the post office. The public lobby floor is covered with dark red terra-cotta tile with cross strips and baseboards of Tokeen marble from Alaska. Walls are clad in light gray Wilkeson sandstone, and a coffered ceiling tops the space. Several original bronze, reverse-pyramid light fixtures remain in the lobby. A nearby elevator lobby has four elevators with original cast-bronze doors bearing floral Art Deco motifs.

At the north end of the vestibule is the U.S. Post Office, which is reached through an opening flanked by stained oak pilasters (attached columns). The postal lobby, which is nearly unchanged since building construction, is one of the most significant interior spaces. Two original postal service windows are cased in stained oak with simple scroll brackets and carved lintels. The floor is covered in polished, dark red, terra-cotta tile with a coved base molding. Stained oak, tongue-in-groove wainscot reaches a height of three feet around the perimeter of the postal lobby and is capped by a stained oak rail. Above the rail, plaster walls are finished in a heavily stippled texture. Plaster cove molding tops the walls and has a fruit-and-leaf design.

== Significant events ==
- 1851: Seattle founders land on Federal Office Building site
- 1889: Seattle Fire starts at Federal Office Building site
- 1931-1933: Federal Office Building constructed
- 1975-1976: Jackson Federal Building constructed
- 1979: Federal Office Building listed in the National Register of Historic Places

== Building facts ==
- Location: 909 First Avenue
- Architect: James A. Wetmore
- Construction Dates: 1931–1933
- Architectural Style: Art Deco
- Landmark Status: Listed in the National Register of Historic Places
- Primary Materials: Red Brick and Terra Cotta
- Prominent Features: Central tower with ziggurat; Art Deco ornamentation
