= List of restaurants in Seattle =

The city of Seattle, Washington, has many notable restaurants. As of the first quarter of 2017, Seattle had 2,696 restaurants. Seattle restaurants’ gross annual sales are a total of $2.9 billion as of 2016. Seattle is the fifth city ranked by restaurant-density with 24.9 restaurants per 10,000 households.

During the COVID-19 pandemic of the early 2020s, several new restaurants emerged through pop-ups and later moved into conventional retail spaces. They supplemented an existing market of food trucks that declined during the pandemic due to their reliance on in-person offices.

== Current ==
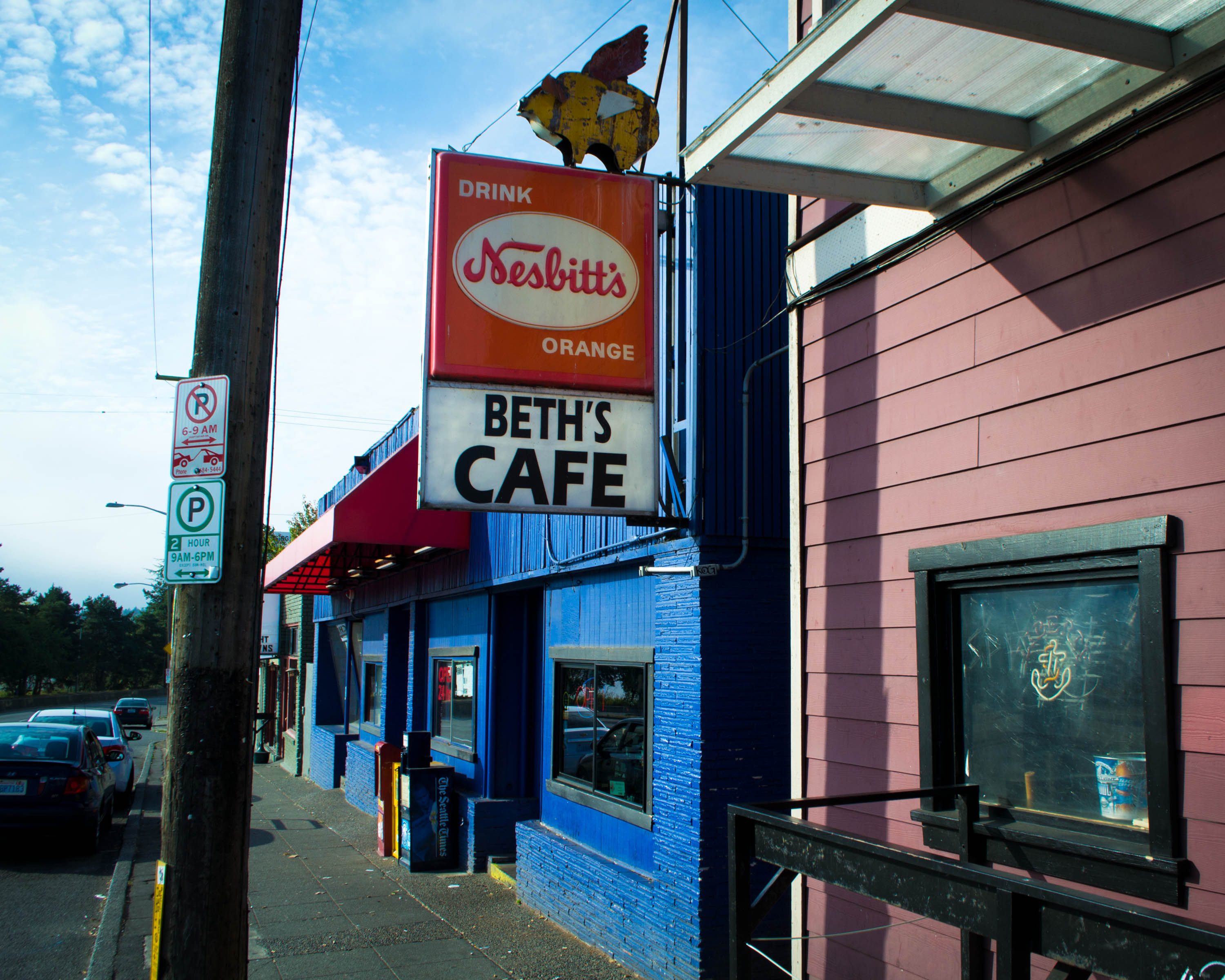
Beth's Cafe in 2012

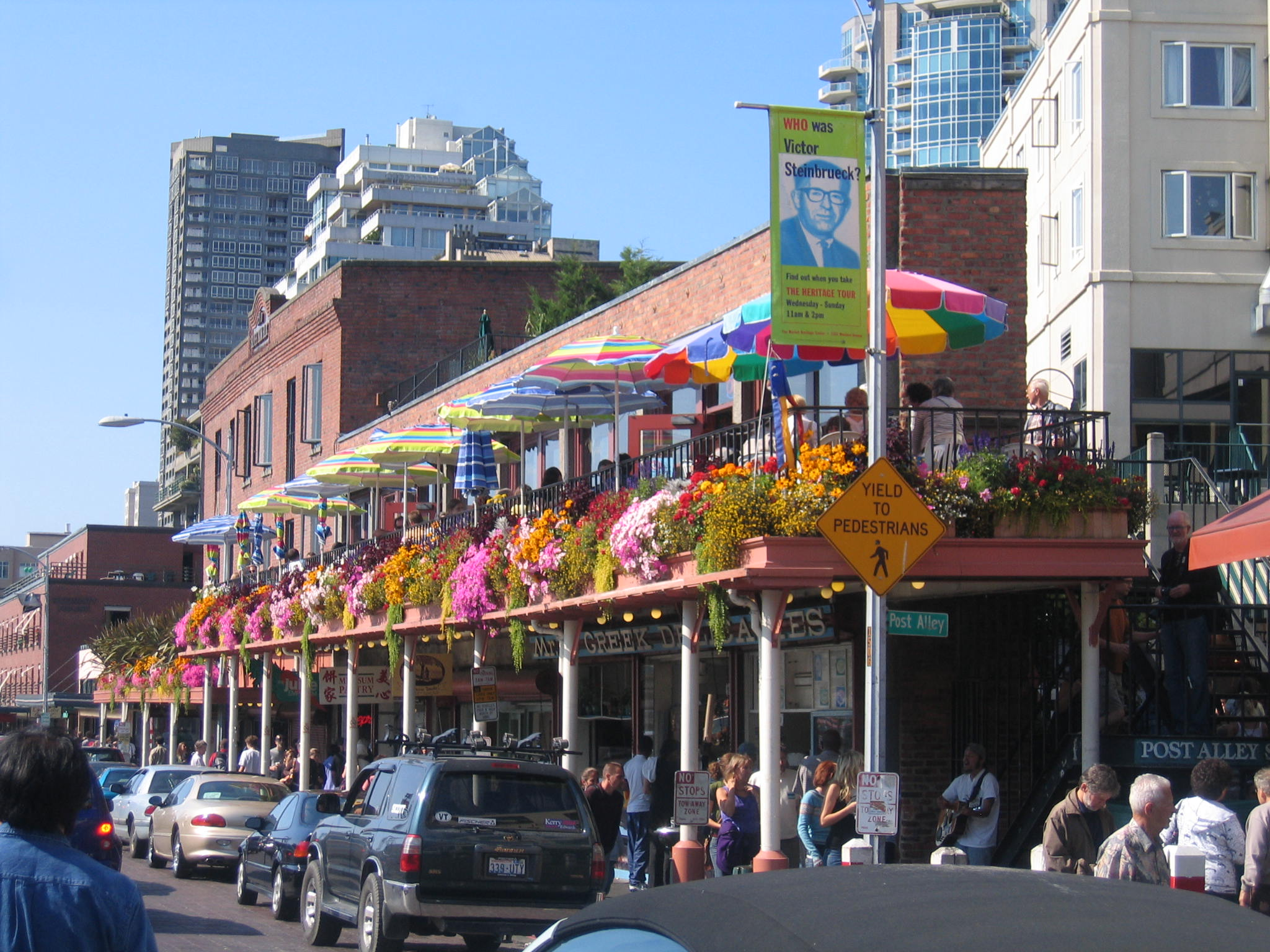
Copacabana Restaurant

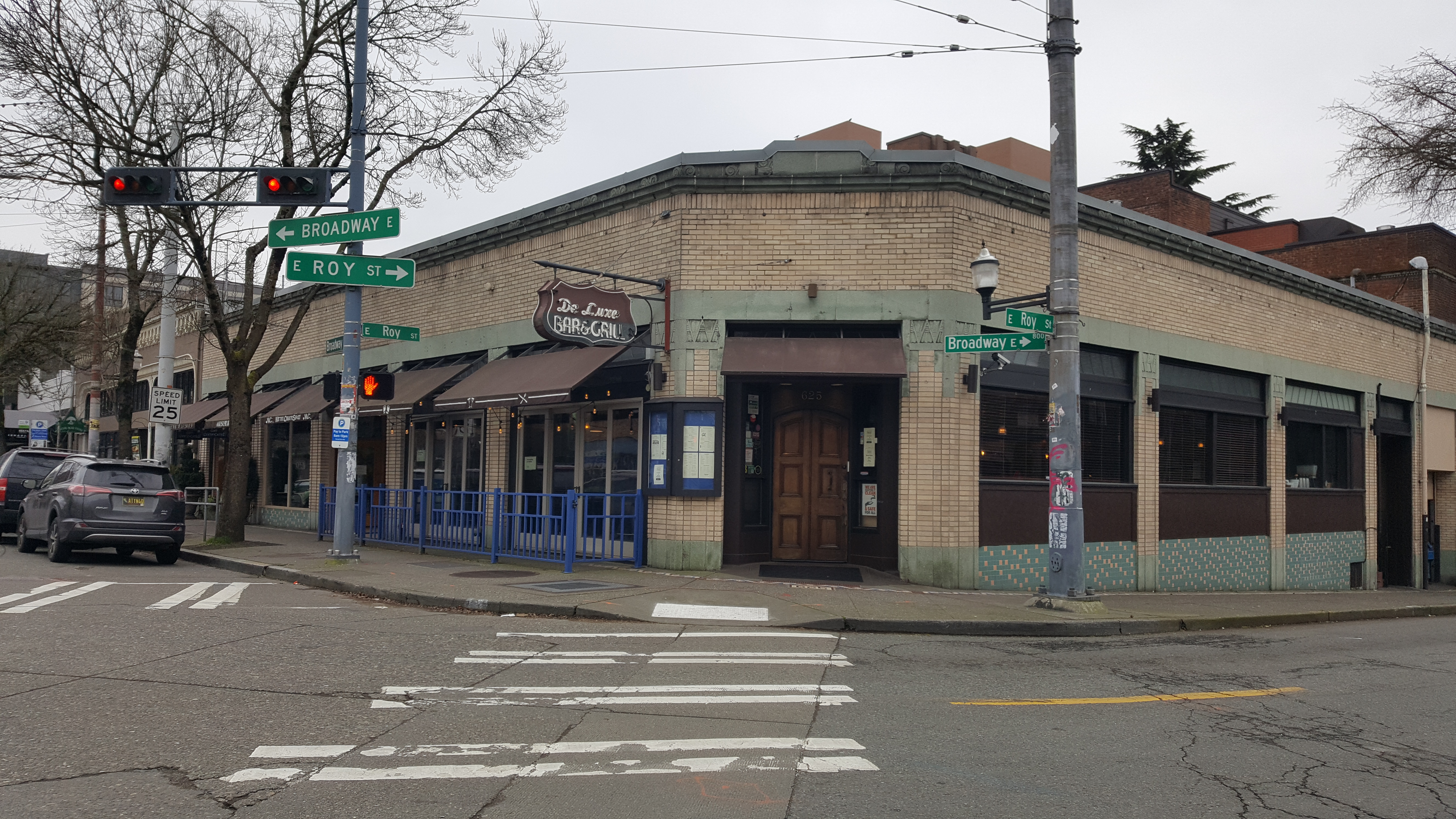
DeLuxe Bar and Grill, 2022

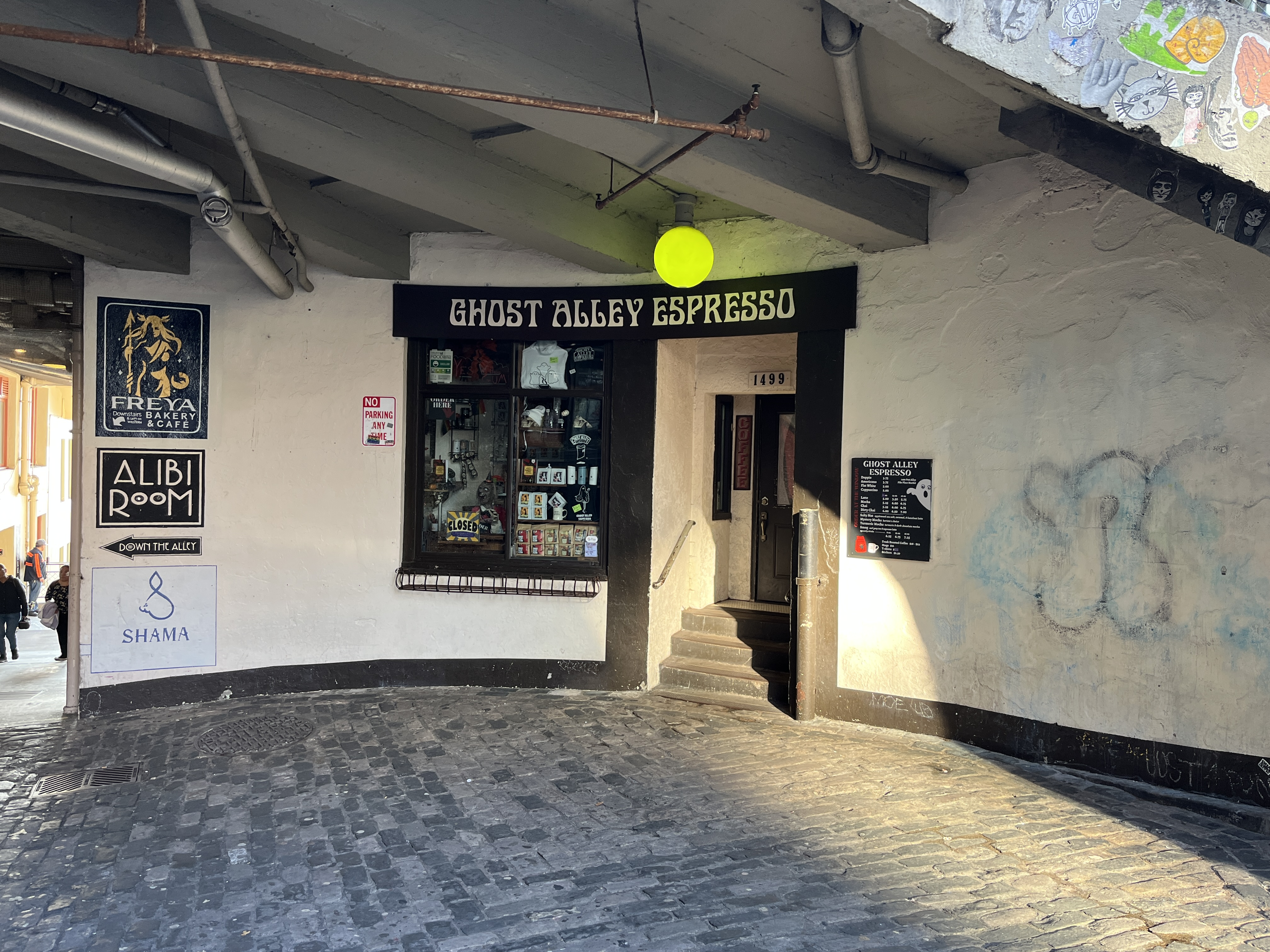
Ghost Alley Espresso

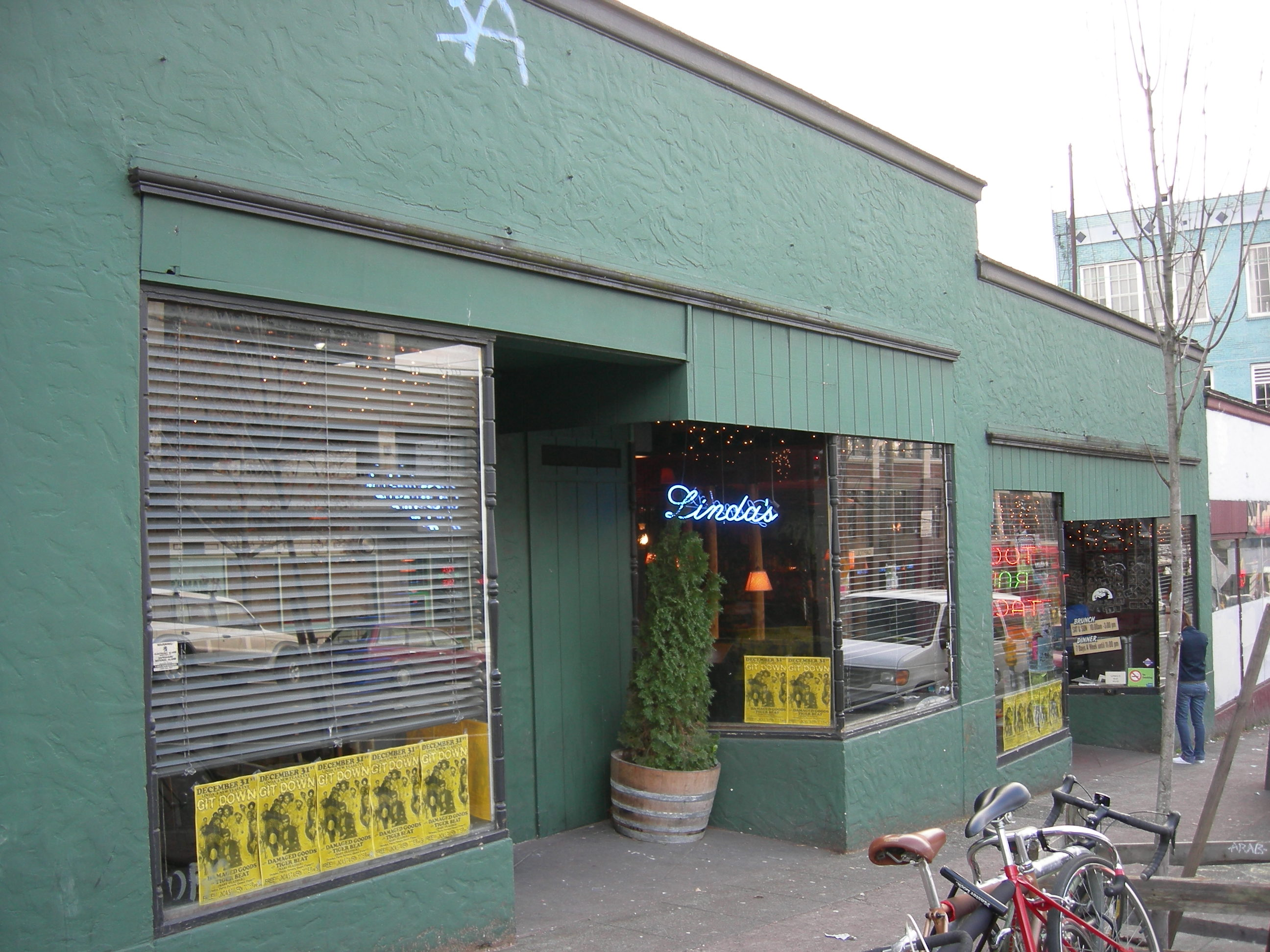
Linda's Tavern in 2006

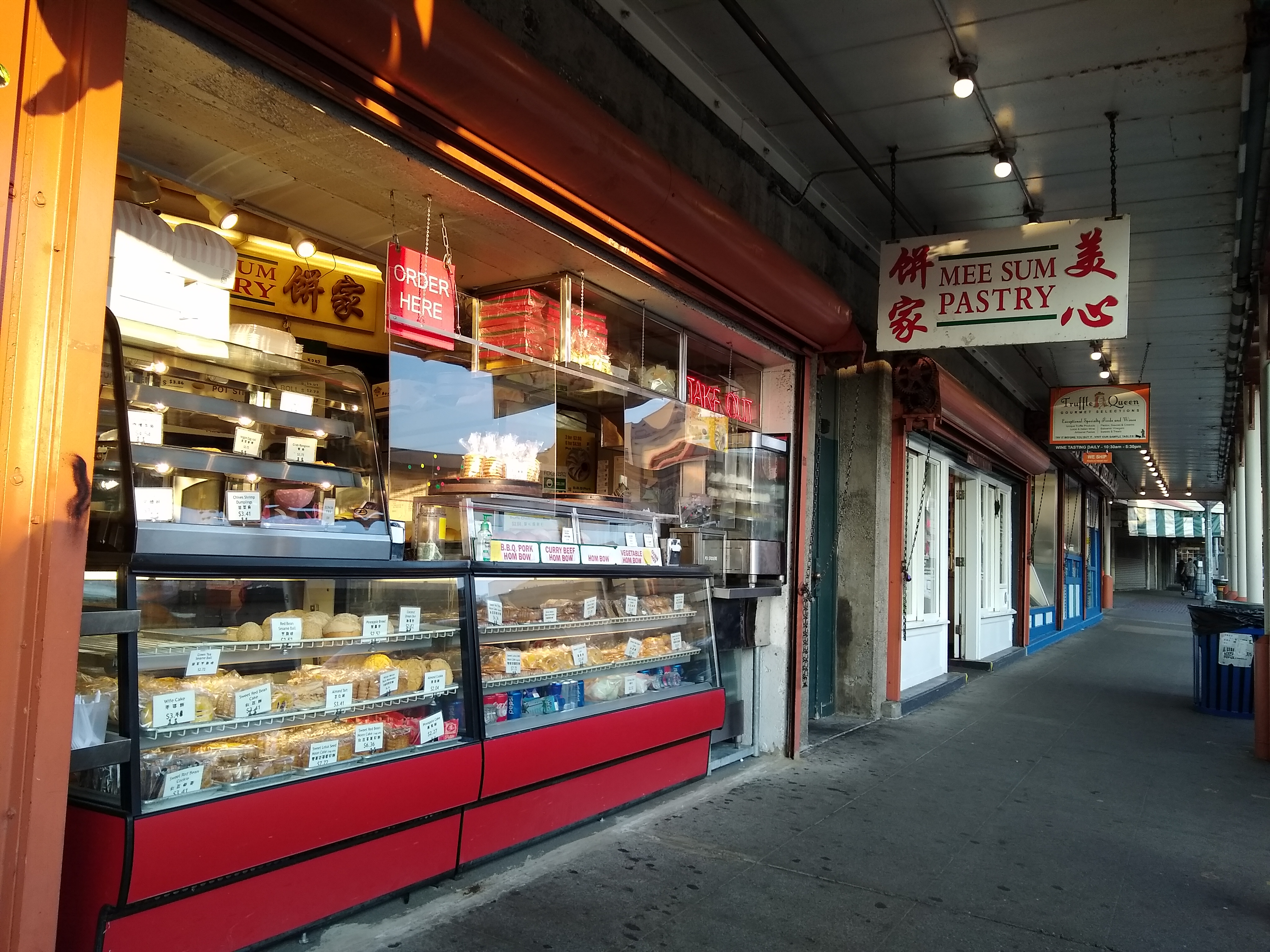
Mee Sum Pastry

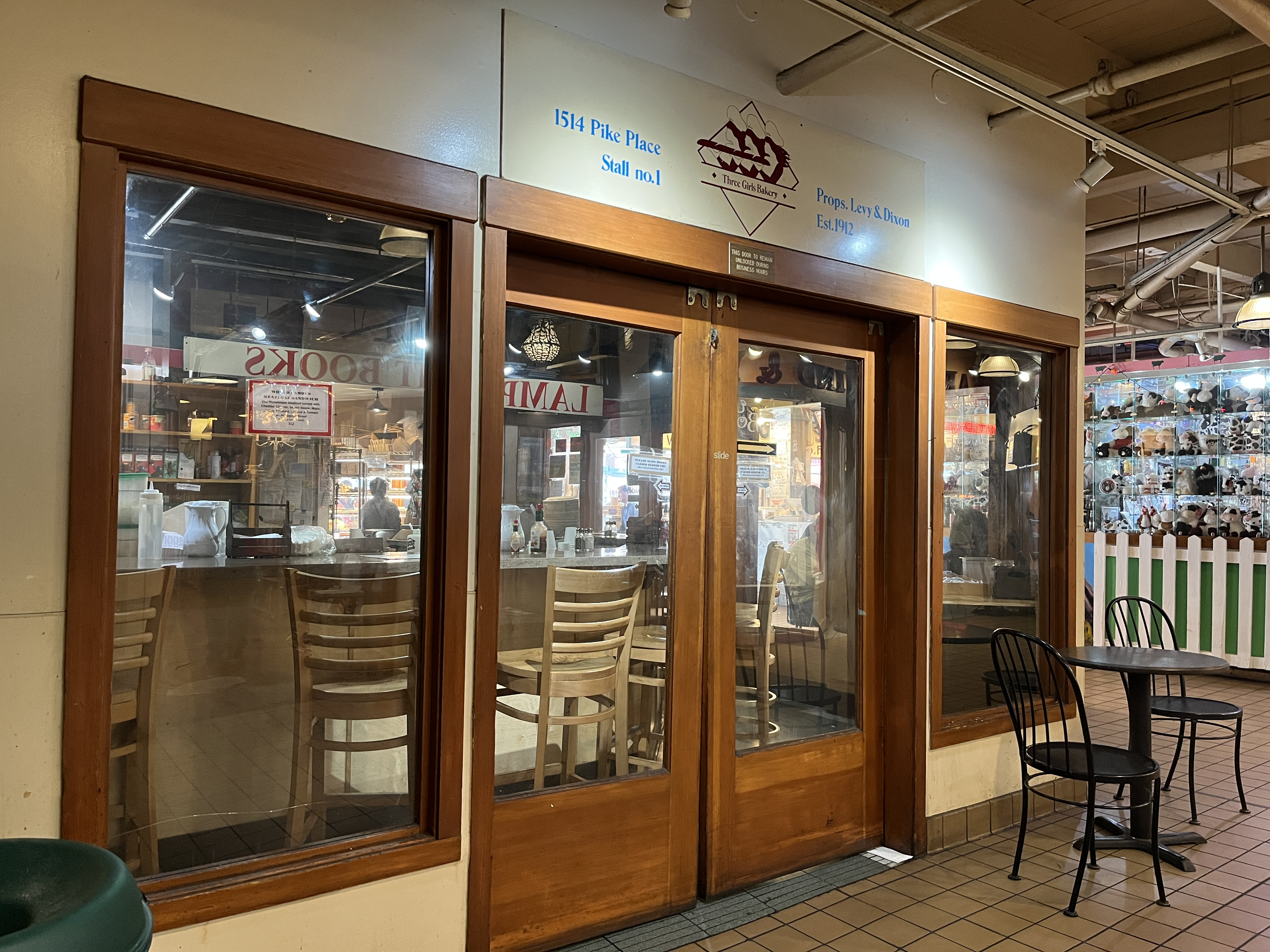
Three Girls Bakery

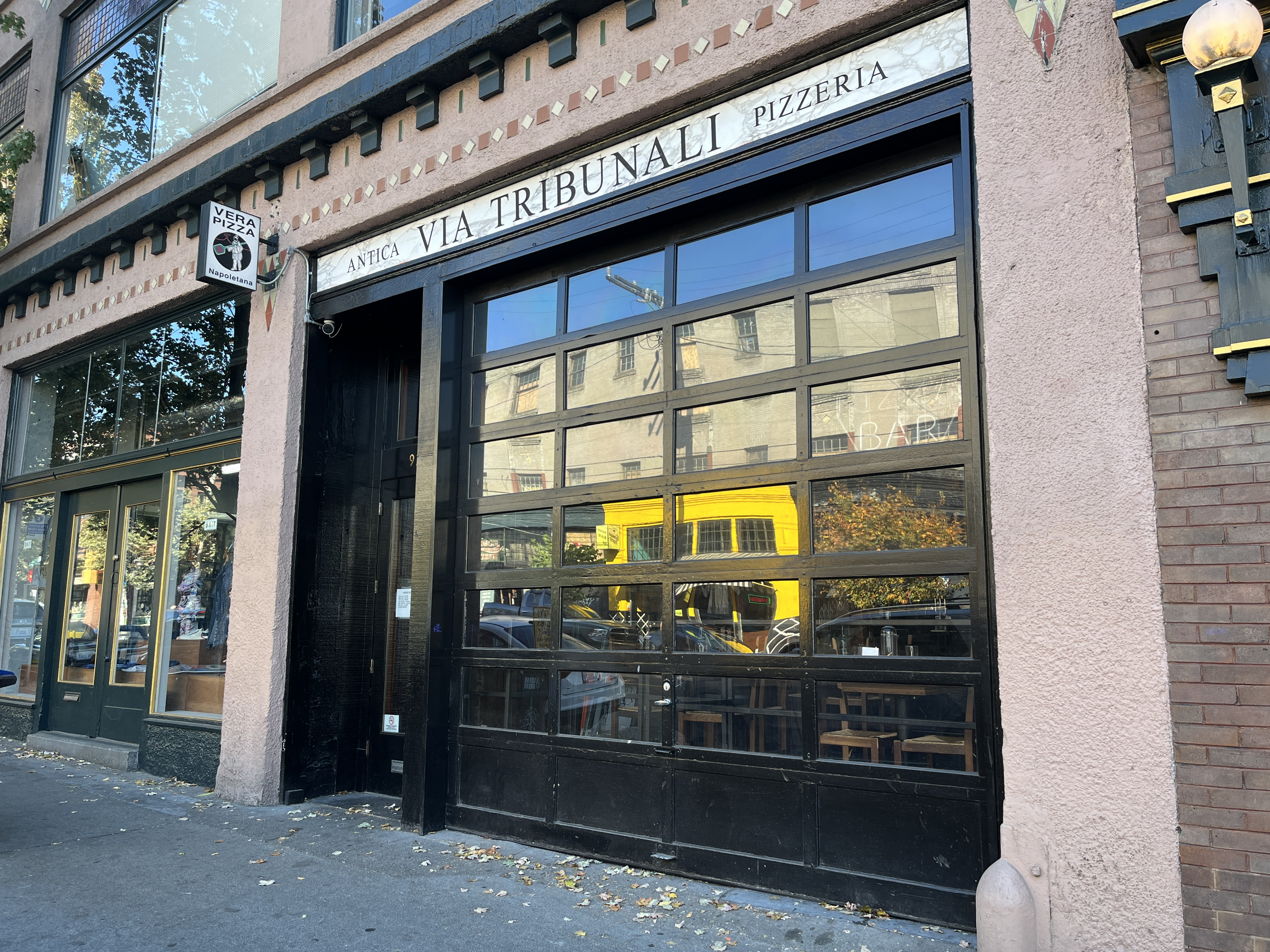
Via Tribunali

Notable restaurants currently operating in Seattle include:

- 14 Carrot Cafe
- 2120
- The 5 Point Cafe
- 8oz Burger & Co
- A+ Hong Kong Kitchen
- Analog Coffee
- Anchorhead Coffee
- Annapurna Cafe
- Archipelago
- Artusi
- Askatu Bakery
- Athenian Seafood Restaurant and Bar
- Atoma (2023)
- Ba Bar
- Bakery Nouveau
- Bar del Corso
- Bateau
- Bauhaus Strong Coffee
- Beast and Cleaver (2019)
- Ben & Esther's Vegan Jewish Deli
- Ben's Bread Co.
- Beth's Cafe
- Big Mario's Pizza
- Biscuit Bitch
- Bizzarro Italian Cafe (1986)
- Black Coffee Northwest
- BluWater Bistro
- Boon Boona Coffee
- C & P Coffee Company
- Cactus (1990)
- Café Allegro
- Café Avole
- Cafe Campagne
- Café Hagen (2019)
- Caffe Ladro (1994)
- Caffè Umbria
- Canlis
- Canon
- Capitol Cider
- The Carlile Room (2015)
- Carmelo's Tacos
- Central Saloon
- Cherry Street Coffee House
- The Chicken Supply
- Cinnamon Works
- Comet Tavern
- Communion Restaurant and Bar
- The Confectional (2006)
- Copacabana Restaurant (1964)
- Coping Cookies
- The Crumpet Shop
- Dahlia Bakery
- Daily Dozen Doughnut Company
- D' La Santa
- D'Ambrosio Gelato
- Dead Line
- Delancey
- DeLaurenti Food & Wine
- DeLuxe Bar and Grill
- Dim Sum King
- Dingfelder's Delicatessen (2018)
- Dino's Tomato Pie
- Don't Yell at Me
- Donut Factory
- Drinkmore Cafe
- Drip Tea
- El Borracho
- El Chupacabra (2005)
- Ellenos Real Greek Yogurt (2013)
- Elm Coffee Roasters
- Eltana (2010)
- Emmett Watson's Oyster Bar
- Espresso Vivace
- Familyfriend
- Fat's Chicken and Waffles
- Feed Co. Burgers
- Fisherman's Restaurant and Bar
- FOB Poke Bar
- Fogón Cocina Mexicana
- Frank's Quality Produce
- Frelard Tamales
- Fuel Coffee & Books
- Fuji Bakery
- Fulcrum Coffee
- Gelatiamo
- General Porpoise
- Georgia's Greek Restaurant & Deli
- Ghost Alley Espresso
- Ghost Note Coffee
- Glo's
- Goldfinch Tavern
- Gracia
- Grand Central Bakery
- Greenlake Bar and Grill
- Hamdi
- Hattie's Hat
- Hellenika Cultured Creamery
- Hello Em (2021)
- Hello Robin
- Homer (2018)
- HoneyHole Sandwiches
- Hood Famous (2014)
- Hot Mama's Pizza
- Huong Binh Vietnamese Cuisine
- Husky Deli
- Indian-Nepali Kitchen
- Jack's Fish Spot
- Jackalope
- Jackson's Catfish Corner
- Jade Garden Restaurant
- Joe's Bar and Grill
- Joule
- Joyale Seafood Restaurant
- Jules Maes Saloon
- Kamonegi
- Katsu Burger
- Kedai Makan
- Kilig
- Kitanda
- Koko's
- La Carta de Oaxaca (2003)
- La Josie's
- Le Panier
- La Parisienne French Bakery
- Lark
- Le Pichet
- Lenox
- Leon Coffee House
- Life on Mars
- Lil Red Takeout and Catering
- Lil Woody's (2011)
- Linda's Tavern
- Local Tide
- Lockspot Cafe
- Lost Lake Cafe and Lounge
- Lowrider Cookie Company
- Ltd Edition Sushi
- Ludi's
- Lupe's Situ Tacos
- Macrina Bakery
- Mad Pizza
- Madrona Arms
- Maíz
- Maneki
- Market Grill
- The Matador
- Matt's in the Market
- Mbar
- Mecca Cafe
- Mee Sum Pastry
- Meesha
- Merchant's Cafe
- Mike's Chili Parlor
- Mike's Noodle House
- Molly Moon's Homemade Ice Cream
- Momiji
- Monorail Espresso
- Monsoon
- Moonrise Bakery
- Moore Coffee
- Moto Pizza
- Musang
- Mr. D's Greek Delicacies
- Mt. Bagel
- Nacho Borracho
- Nue
- Oasis Tea Zone
- Oddfellows Cafe and Bar
- Off Alley (2020)
- Off the Rez (2011)
- Ooink
- Oriental Mart
- The Original Philly's
- Original Starbucks
- Osteria la Spiga (1998)
- Overcast Coffee Company
- Oxbow
- Paju
- Palace Kitchen (1996)
- Palisade
- Pam's Kitchen
- Pancita
- Paseo
- Pegasus Coffee Company
- Phin
- Phnom Penh Noodle House
- Phở Bắc
- Pike Place Bakery
- Pike Place Chinese Cuisine
- Pike Place Chowder
- The Pink Door
- Pinoyshki Bakery & Cafe (formerly Piroshki on 3rd)
- Piroshky Piroshky
- Poquitos
- Post Alley Pizza
- Push x Pull
- QED Coffee
- Quick Pack Food Mart
- Quinn's Pub
- R+M Dessert Bar
- Radiator Whiskey
- Raised Doughnuts
- Ramen Danbo
- Ray's Boathouse
- Red Cow
- Red Mill Burgers
- Regent Bakery and Cafe
- Rhein Haus Seattle
- Rione XIII
- Ristorante Machiavelli
- Rob Roy
- Rocket Taco
- Rough and Tumble Pub
- Rubinstein Bagels
- Rumba
- Rupee Bar
- Saigon Deli
- Saigon Vietnam Deli
- Saint Bread (2021)
- Sal Y Limón
- Salty's
- Salumi
- Sam's Tavern
- Sea Wolf
- Seattle Best Tea (1996)
- Seattle Coffee Works
- Seattle Harbor
- Serafina (1991)
- Serious Pie
- Shug's Soda Fountain and Ice Cream (2016)
- Sisters and Brothers Bar (2016)
- Skillet
- Slim's Last Chance
- Spice Waala
- Spinasse
- Storyville Coffee
- Sugar Bakery & Cafe
- Sully's Snowgoose Saloon
- Sushi Kashiba
- Sweet Alchemy
- Taco del Mar
- Tacos Chukis
- Tai Tung
- Tamari Bar
- Tamarind Tree
- Taurus Ox
- Tavern Law (2009)
- Tavolàta
- Taylor Shellfish Company, operates oyster bars in Capitol Hill and Pioneer Square
- Temple Pastries
- Terra Plata
- Thanh Son Tofu and Bakery
- That's Amore Italian Cafe
- Three Girls Bakery
- Torrefazione Italia
- The Triple Door
- Turkish Delight
- Uli's Famous Sausage
- Un Bien
- Uptown Espresso
- Via Tribunali
- Victrola Coffee Roasters
- Virginia Inn
- Volunteer Park Cafe & Pantry
- Voula's Offshore Cafe
- The Walrus and the Carpenter
- Westman's Bagel & Coffee
- Westward
- The Whale Wins (2012)
- White Swan Public House
- Wild Ginger (1989)
- Wild Mountain Cafe
- Wood Shop BBQ
- World Pizza
- Wunderground Coffee (2021)
- Xi'an Noodles (2016)
- Yummy House Bakery (1998)
- Zeitgeist Coffee
- Zig Zag Café
- Zylberschtein's

== Defunct ==
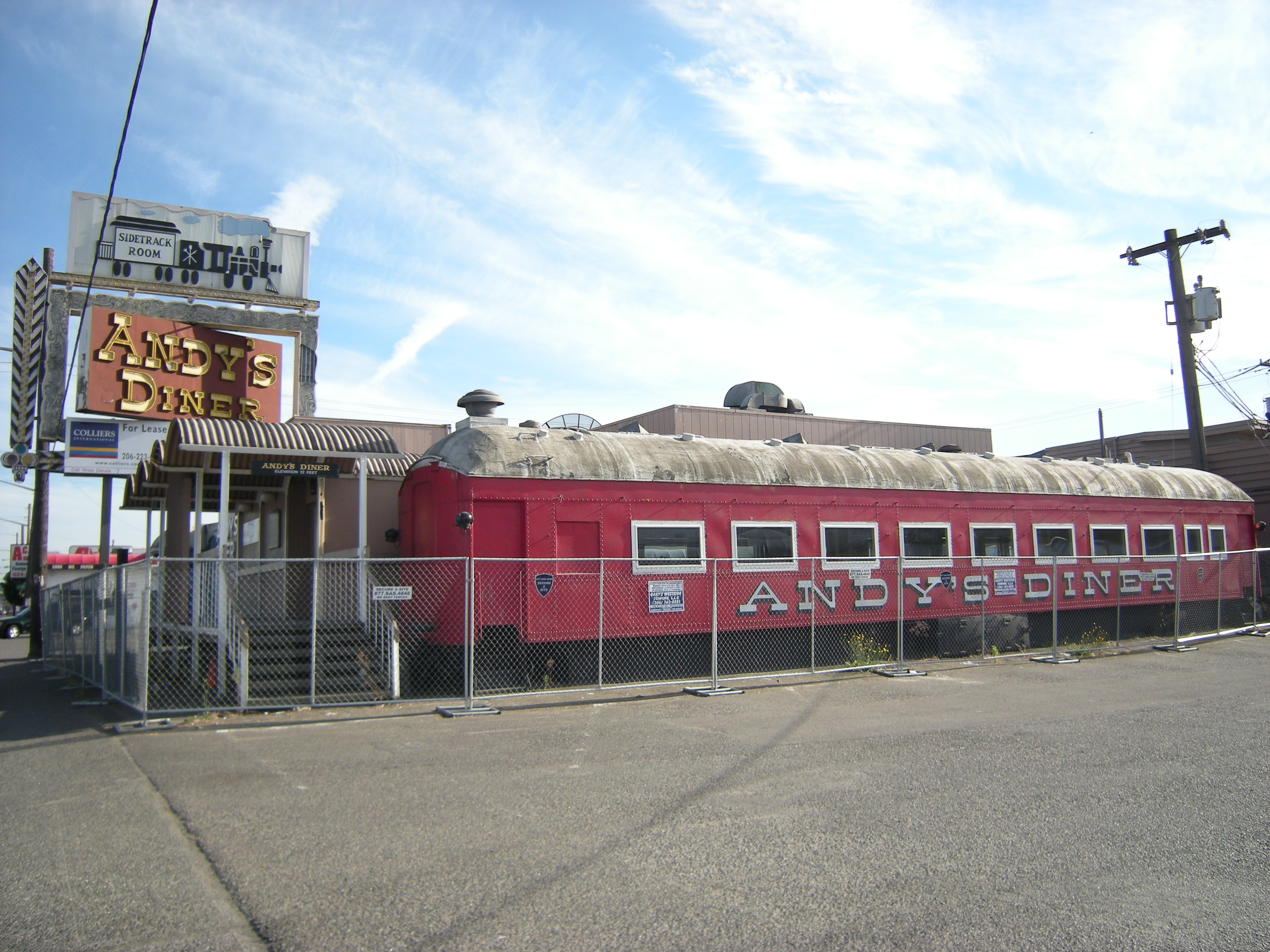
Andy's Diner

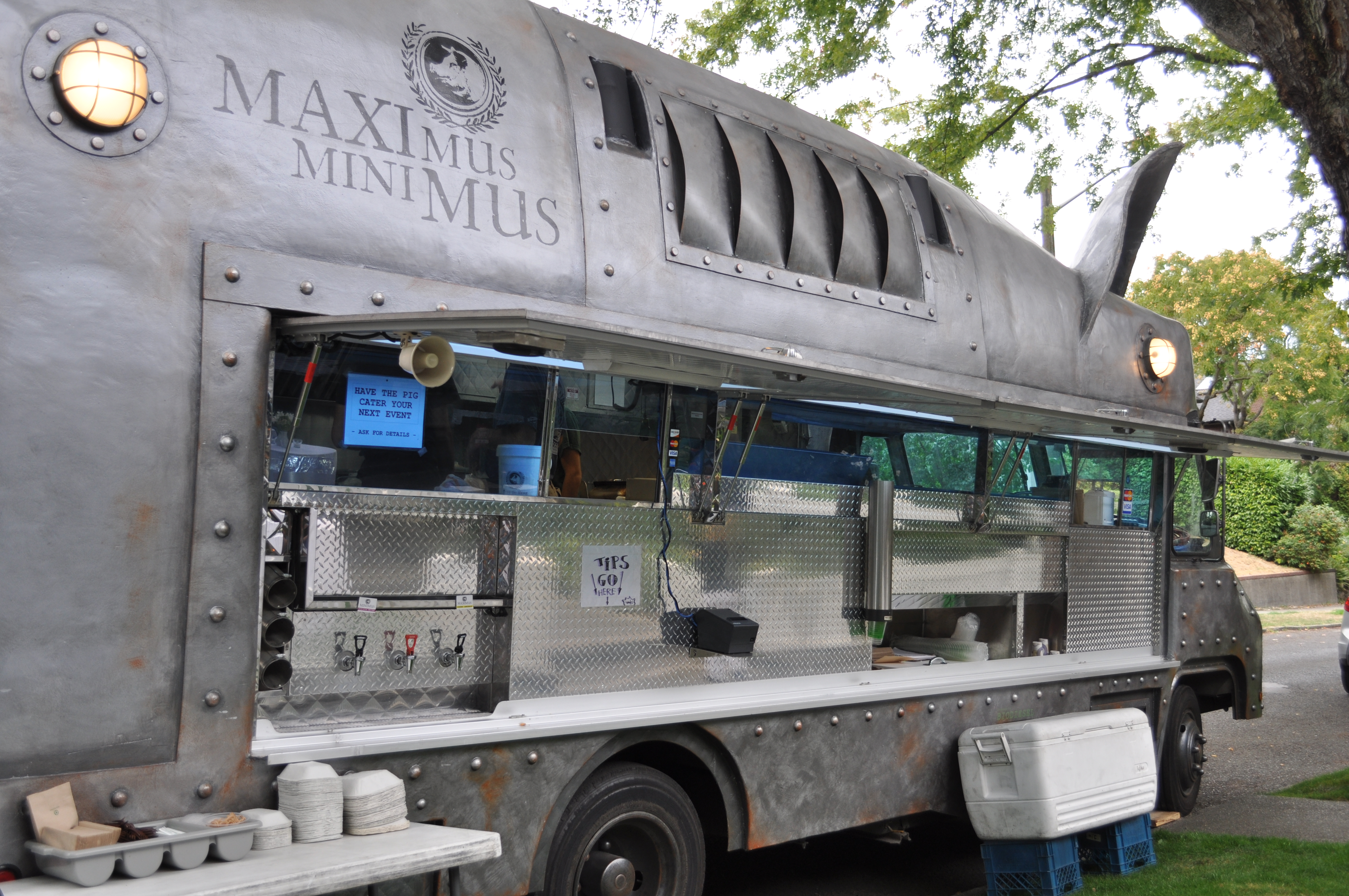
Maximus/Minimus

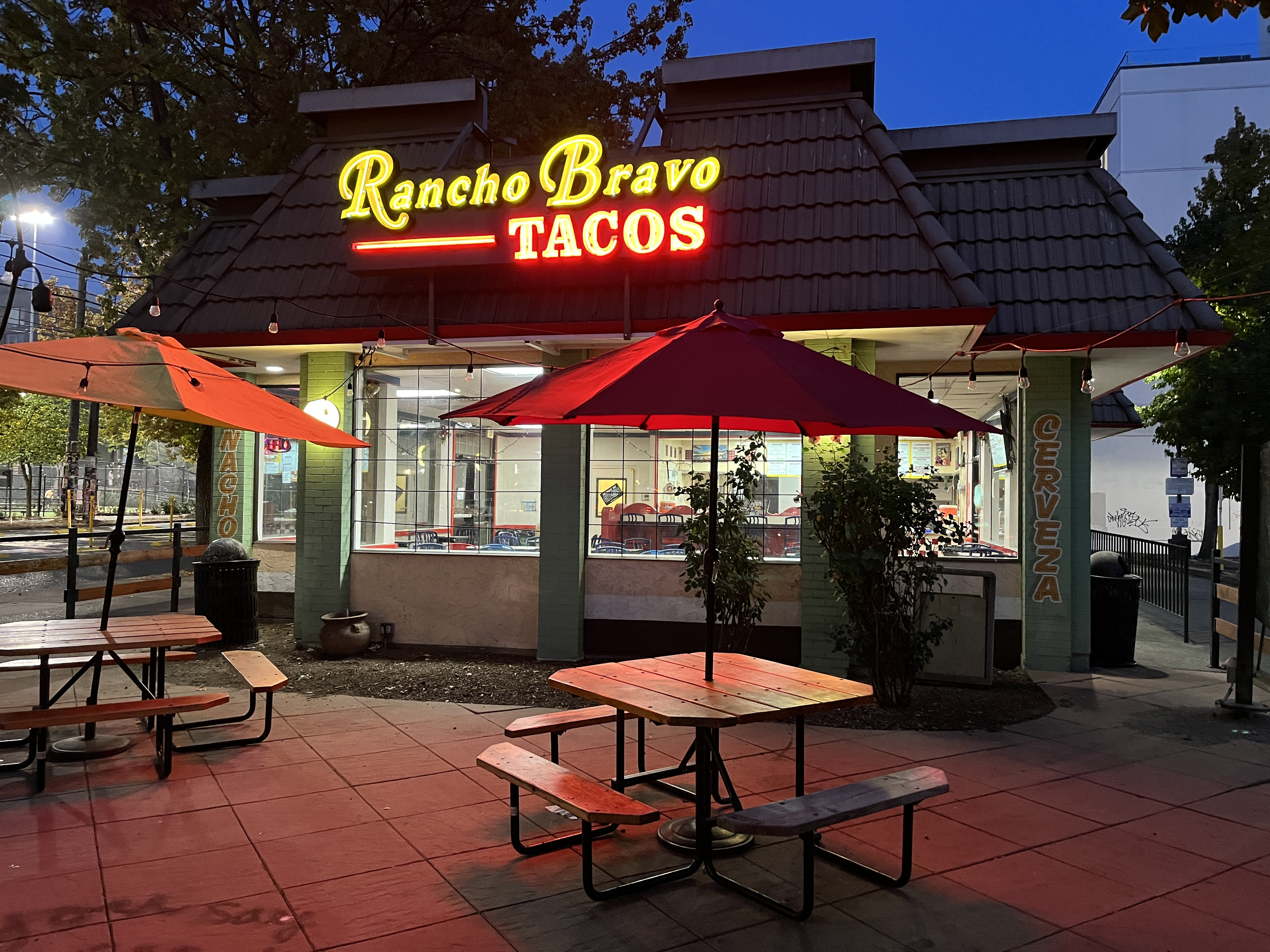
Rancho Bravo Tacos, Capitol Hill

Defunct restaurants include:

- ʔálʔal Café (2022–2024)
- Andy's Diner
- Barrio
- Bavarian Meats
- Blazing Bagels
- Blotto
- Boca
- Bok a Bok
- Burbs Burgers
- Bush Garden
- Coastal Kitchen (1993–2024)
- Copine
- Country Dough
- Dacha Diner
- Eastern Cafe
- Eight Row (2019–2024)
- Half and Half Doughnut Co.
- Harbor City Restaurant
- Iron Horse
- Itsumono
- JarrBar
- JuneBaby
- Kōbo Pizza
- Last Exit on Brooklyn
- The London Plane (2014–2022)
- Loulay (2013–2021)
- Mamnoon
- Manning's Cafeterias
- Marjorie
- Marmite (2016–2023)
- Maximus/Minimus
- Michou Deli
- Miller's Guild (2013–2021)
- Mt. Joy
- Omega Ouzeri (2015–2024)
- Optimism Brewing Company
- Pizzeria Credo
- Pizzeria Gabbiano
- Plum Bistro
- Poppy
- Purr Cocktail Lounge (2005–2018)
- Rancho Bravo Tacos
- The Red Door
- Salare (2015–2021)
- Shanghai Garden Restaurant (1990–2025)
- Shikorina (2001–2026)
- Sitka and Spruce (2006–2019)
- SkyCity
- Sophon
- Starbucks Reserve Roastery
- Stateside
- Tin Table
- Tula's Restaurant and Jazz Club
- Vito's
- The Woods

== Chains ==
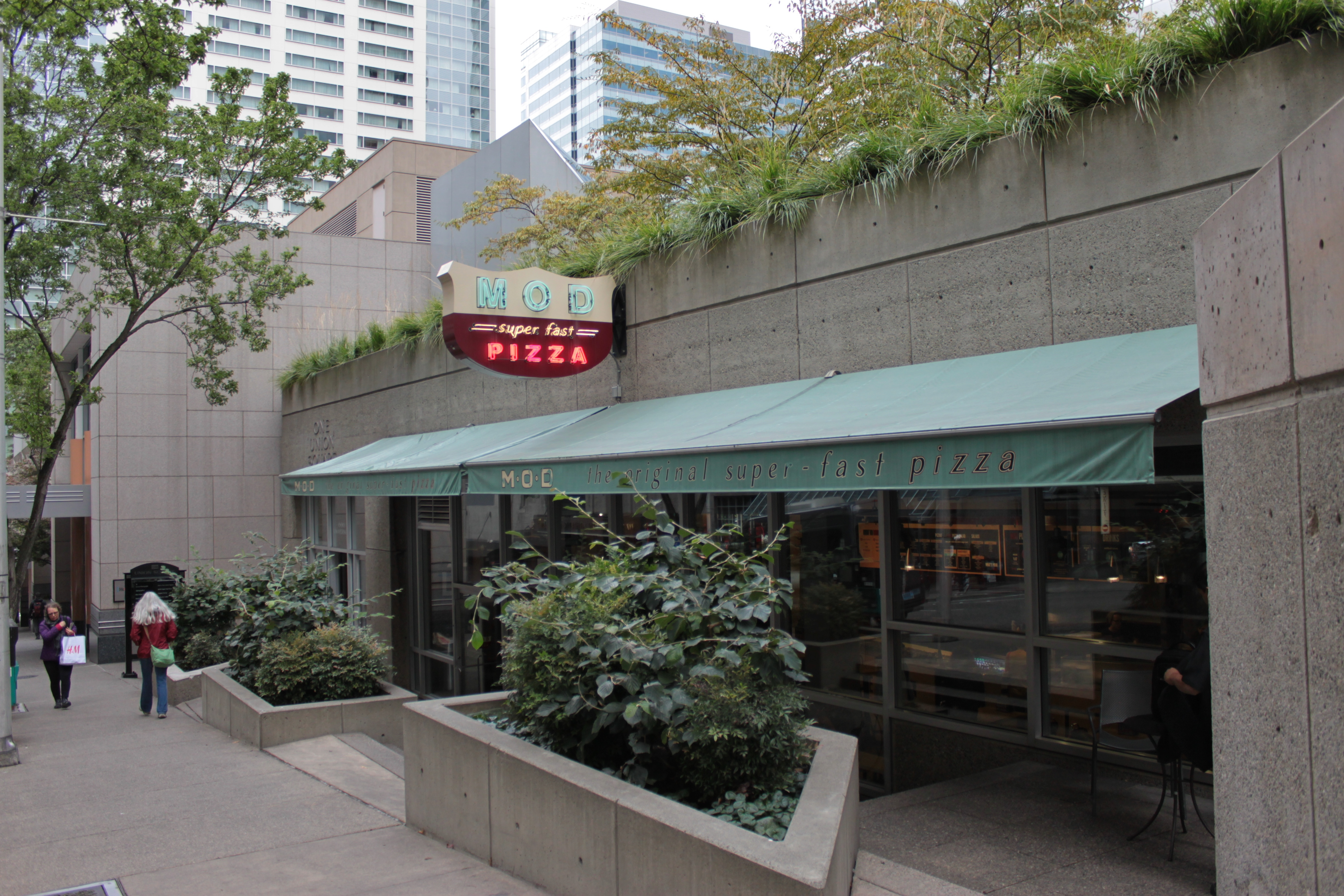
MOD Pizza at Union Square

Restaurant chains based in Seattle include:

- Dick's Drive-In
- Ezell's Chicken
- Ivar's
- Mighty-O Donuts
- MOD Pizza
- Pagliacci Pizza
- Red Robin
- Seattle's Best Coffee
- Starbucks
- Top Pot Doughnuts

== See also ==
- Asean Streat Food Hall (2022–2026)
- Pike Place Market
  - List of restaurants in Pike Place Market
- Pacific Northwest cuisine
