= Tomo (restaurant) =

Restaurant in White Center, Washington, U.S.

- Interactive map of Tomo

Restaurant information
- Established: September 2021
- Owner: Brady Williams
- Pastry chef: Richard Garcia
- Food type: American
- Location: 9811 16th Avenue SW, White Center, Washington, 98106, United States
- Coordinates: 47°30′55″N 122°21′19″W
- Website: tomoseattle.com

Tomo is a restaurant in White Center, Washington. Chef Brady Williams opened the restaurant in 2021.

== Description ==
The Japanese-influenced American restaurant Tomo operates in White Center, Washington. It has a seating capacity of 28 people. The menu has included barley porridge with eggplant, sunchokes, grilled pork rib chop with leeks in butter sauce, and a fried egg with lamb belly bacon and salsa verde.

== History ==
Chef Brady Williams opened the restaurant in 2021. Richard Garcia is the pastry chef. Initially offer a tasting menu, Tomo introduced an a la carte menu in mid 2023.

== Reception ==
In 2022, Tomo was a semifinalist in the Outstanding Wine Program category of the James Beard Foundation Awards, and ranked number 30 in Esquire's list of the best new restaurants. Aimee Rizzo included Tomo in The Infatuation's 2023 list of the best restaurants for vegetarian food in Seattle. She and Kayla Sager-Riley also included the business in a 2024 overview of the city's most romantic restaurants.

Jenise Silva included the business in Eater Seattle's 2022 overview of thirteen "wonderful" restaurants in White Center. In 2024, Jade Yamazaki Stewart and Harry Cheadle included Tomo in the website's 2022 list of restaurants for celebrating special occasions. Eater Seattle also included the business in a 2024 overview of 38 "essential" restaurants in the city. Tomo is one of Shota Nakajima's favorite restaurants.

== See also ==
- List of restaurants in Seattle
