= Red Door =

(The) Red Door may refer to:

- Red Door (venue), an event and music space in Chelsea, New York City
- The Red Door (restaurant), a restaurant in Seattle
- Insidious: The Red Door, a 2023 American supernatural horror film
- La porta rossa, lit. 'The Red Door', an Italian noir television series
- "The Red Door" (The IT Crowd), an episode of the TV series The IT Crowd
- Red Door, original name and signature fragrance of Elizabeth Arden, Inc.
- Red Door gin, a gin made at Benromach distillery in Scotland

== See also ==
- Red Doors, a 2005 American independent comedy drama film
