= Merchant's Cafe =

Restaurant in Seattle, Washington, U.S.

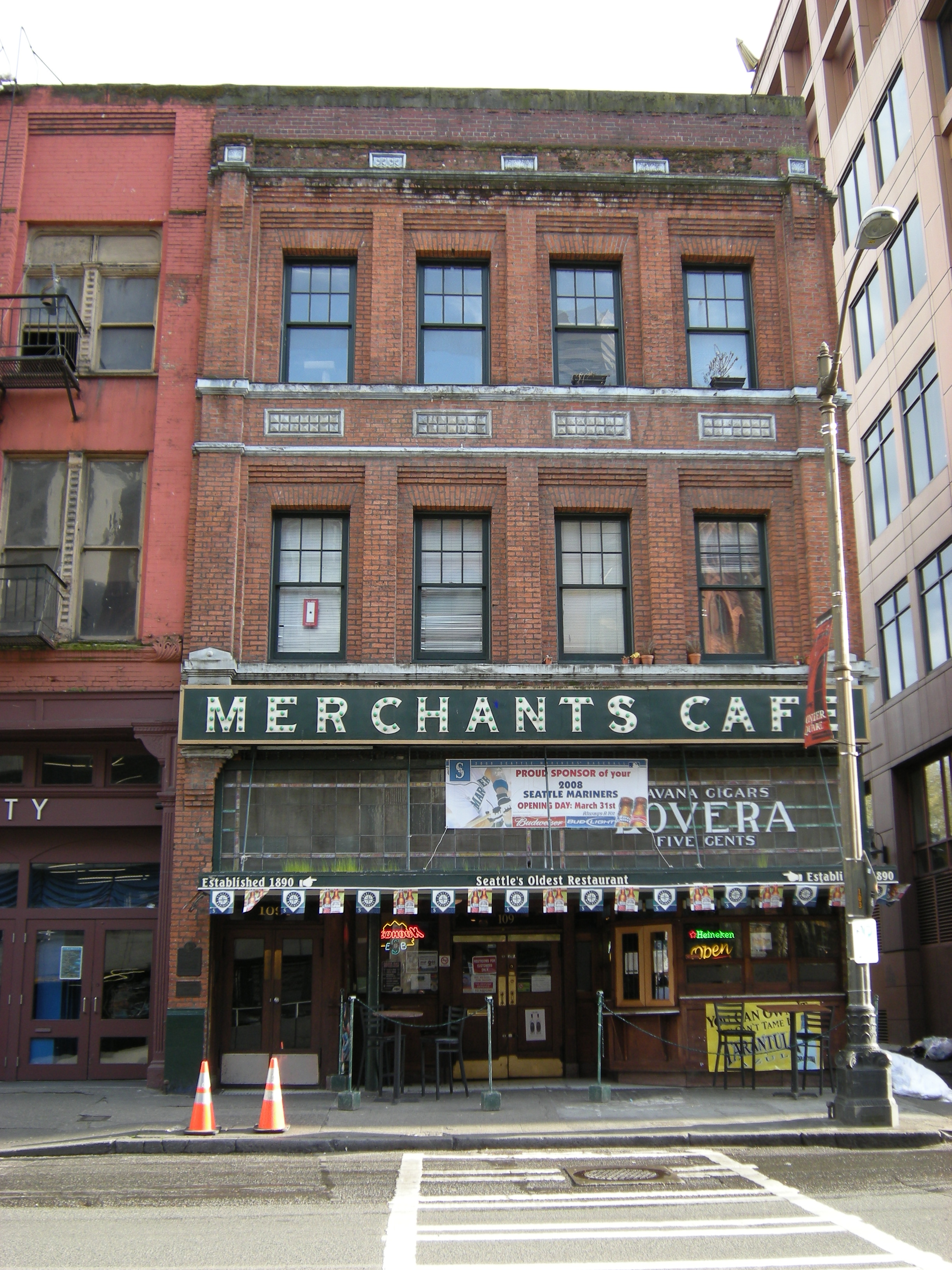
- The restaurant's exterior, 2008
- Interactive map of Merchant's Cafe

Restaurant information
- Location: 109 Yesler Way, Seattle, Washington, 98104, United States
- Coordinates: 47°36′5.7″N 122°20′0.4″W

Merchant's Cafe is a restaurant located in Seattle, Washington, United States. Located at the corner of James and Yesler in the Pioneer Square neighborhood, it has operated since 1890. The restaurant bills itself as the city's longest operating restaurant.

== History ==
Exterior of restaurant, 2011

The restaurant was founded by John Hall Sanderson. While being rebuilt due to the Great Seattle Fire (1889), the building was attached to the neighboring Sanderson Block Building. The building was designed by W.E. Boone. Following its rebuild, the space was sold to Charles Osner in 1892 and was reestablished as the Merchants Exchange Saloon. During this time, the second level of the building was used as a brothel. In 1898, Franz Schreiner purchased the building. The restaurant remained under the ownership of the Schreiner family until the 1970s.

In 1916, the restaurant and saloon were moved to the basement of the building due to prohibition. Due to the hardship of the economic crash in 1929, the restaurant struggled to remain open. It operated as the Merchant's Hotel between the 1920s and 1930s. The owners Franz Schreiner, Max Ostermann, and Karl Dachs were formally given a license to serve alcohol by the Bureau of Internal Revenue in 1952.

Subsequently, the building was renovated in 1972 under the management of Dick Moultrie. The following year the restaurant began hosting live music including jazz and blues. In 1977 the Seattle-founded band Heart celebrated the release of their record Little Queen at the then restaurant and bar.

The restaurant closed temporarily in January 2025 and was reopened on March 1, 2025.

Today the restaurant is regarded as a possibly haunted location.

== See also ==
- List of reportedly haunted locations in the United States
- List of restaurants in Seattle
