= Lockspot Cafe =

Restaurant in Seattle, Washington, U.S.

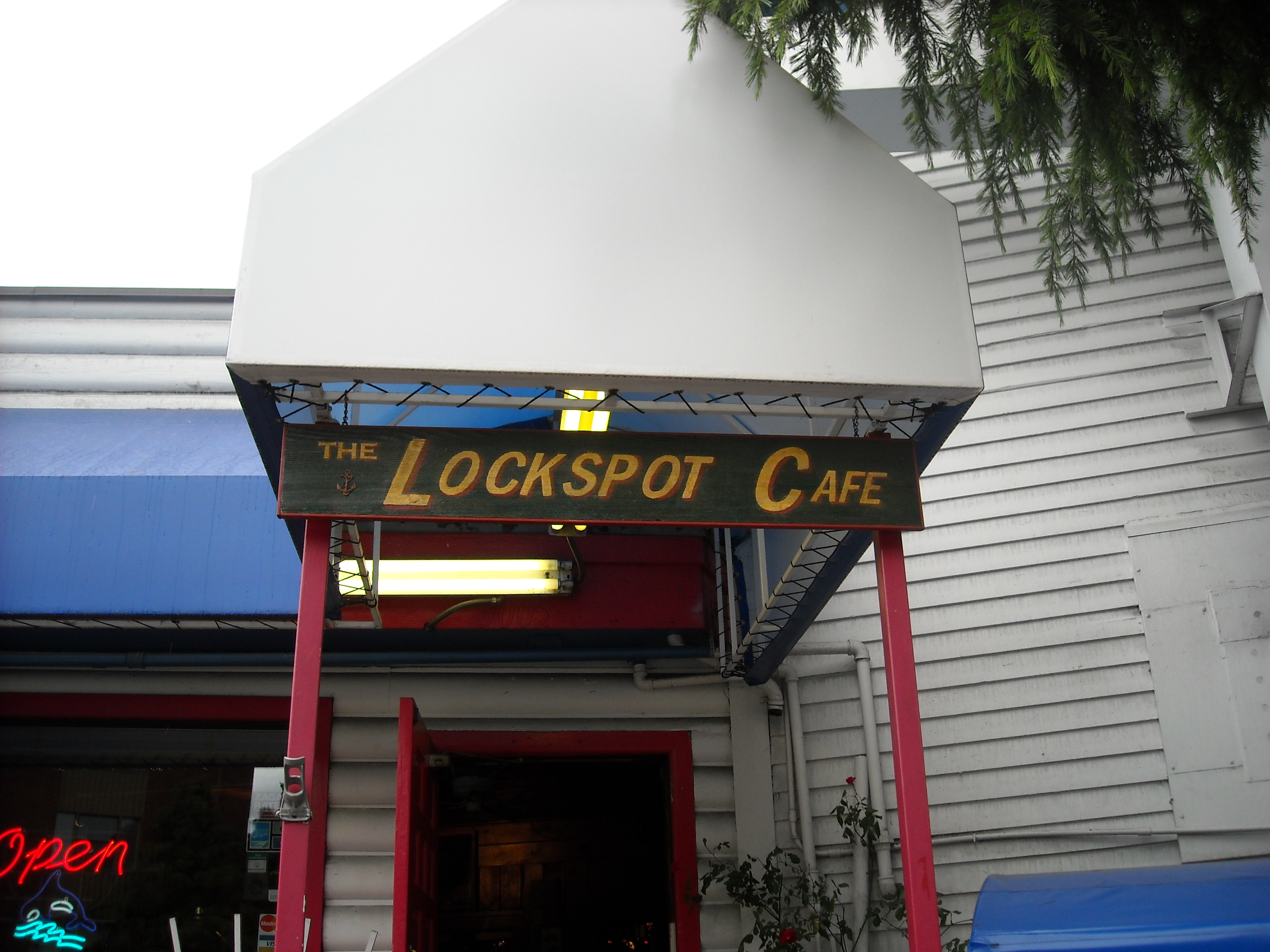
- The restaurant's exterior, 2010
- Interactive map of Lockspot Cafe

Restaurant information
- Location: 3005 Northwest Locks Place, Seattle, Washington, 98107, United States
- Coordinates: 47°40′4″N 122°23′45″W

Lockspot Cafe is a restaurant in Seattle's Ballard neighborhood, in the U.S. state of Washington. The restaurant has operated for 90 years, as of 2020. Alison Soike and Ryan Faniel purchased the restaurant from Pam Hanson in 2021. The cafe has been featured on the Discovery Channel series Deadliest Catch.

== See also ==
- List of restaurants in Seattle
