= Voula's Offshore Cafe =

Restaurant in Seattle, Washington, U.S.

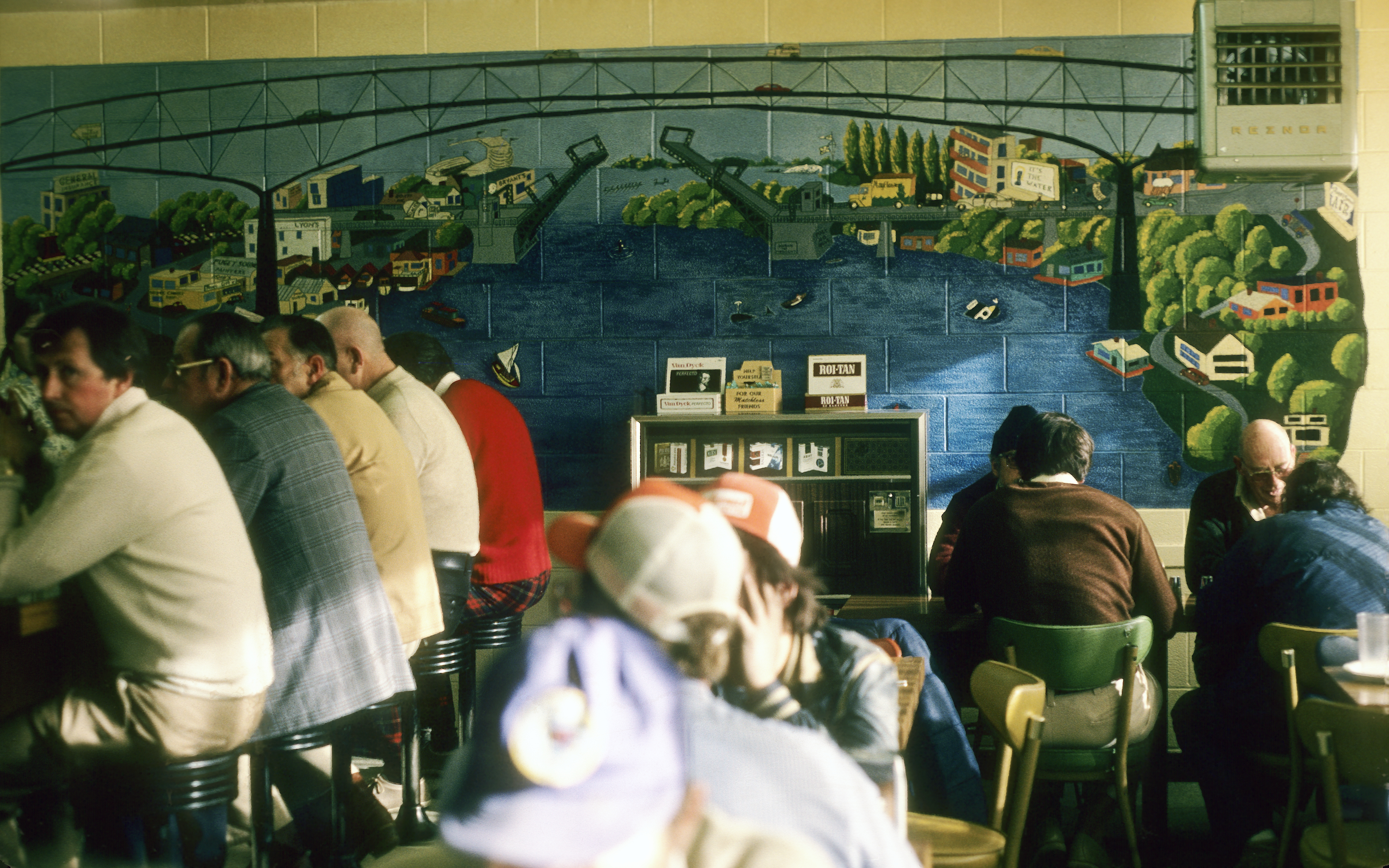
- Diners at the cafe in 1975
- Interactive map of Voula's Offshore Cafe

Restaurant information
- Location: 658 NE Northlake Way, Seattle, Washington, 98105, United States
- Coordinates: 47°39′17″N 122°19′17.5″W
- Website: voulasoffshore.com

Voula's Offshore Cafe is a restaurant in Seattle, in the U.S. state of Washington. The restaurant has appeared on the television series Diners, Drive-Ins and Dives.

== See also ==
- List of Diners, Drive-Ins and Dives episodes
