= Slim's Last Chance =

Restaurant in Seattle, Washington, U.S.

- Interactive map of Slim's Last Chance

Restaurant information
- Location: 5606 First Avenue South, Seattle, Washington, 98108, United States
- Coordinates: 47°33′9″N 122°20′2″W
- Website: slimslastchance.com

Slim's Last Chance is a restaurant in Seattle, in the U.S. state of Washington.

== History ==
The business has been featured on the television series Diners, Drive-Ins and Dives.

== Reception ==
Thrillist says, "Slim's is the best place to kick back with some brew and some exceptional wings. Don't say we didn't warn you."

== See also ==
- List of Diners, Drive-Ins and Dives episodes
