= Sisters and Brothers Bar =

Restaurant in Seattle, Washington, U.S.

- Interactive map of Sisters and Brothers Bar

Restaurant information
- Location: 544 Elliot Avenue West, Seattle, King, Washington, 98119, United States
- Coordinates: 47°37′28″N 122°21′54″W
- Website: sistersandbrothersbar.com

Sisters and Brothers Bar is a restaurant in Seattle's Interbay neighborhood, in the U.S. state of Washington. It has been featured on the Food Network series Diners, Drive-Ins and Dives.

== Description ==
The menu includes Nashville-style hot chicken, cabbage-and-pepper coleslaw, collards, and fried green tomatoes. The restaurant serves fried chicken sandwiches.

== History ==
Jake Manny opened Sisters and Brothers in March 2016. The restaurant operated in the Georgetown neighborhood, before relocating to Interbay.

== See also ==
- List of Diners, Drive-Ins and Dives episodes
