= Sully's Snowgoose Saloon =

Bar in Seattle, Washington, U.S.

- Interactive map of Sully's Snowgoose Saloon

Restaurant information
- Owner: Tim Sullivan
- Location: 6119 Phinney Ave. N., Seattle, King, Washington, 98103, United States
- Coordinates: 47°40′26″N 122°21′16″W

Sully's Snowgoose Saloon is a bar in Seattle, in the U.S. state of Washington.

== Description ==
Sully's Snowgoose Saloon is located at the intersection of 62nd Street at Phinney Avenue North, in Seattle's Phinney Ridge neighborhood. The dog-friendly tavern is housed in a building completed in 1924. It has a fireplace, a patio, and pinball machines. Eater Seattle has said the bar's exterior "resembles a quaint fantastical shack located in the green hills of some fairy tale. Its white walls and pointy roof instantly make the place seem warm, quirky, and inviting". Sully's has also been described as a "mini chalet on the outside" and feels like a "cozy ski cabin" on the inside.

== History ==
Tim Sullivan is the owner of Sully's (formerly La Bohème). The bar hosted a pie jousting contest in 2012.
