= Miller's Guild =

Defunct restaurant in Seattle, Washington, U.S.

- Interactive map of Miller's Guild

Restaurant information
- Location: Seattle, Washington, United States
- Coordinates: 47°36′51″N 122°20′12″W

Miller's Guild was a restaurant in Seattle, in the U.S. state of Washington.

== Description ==
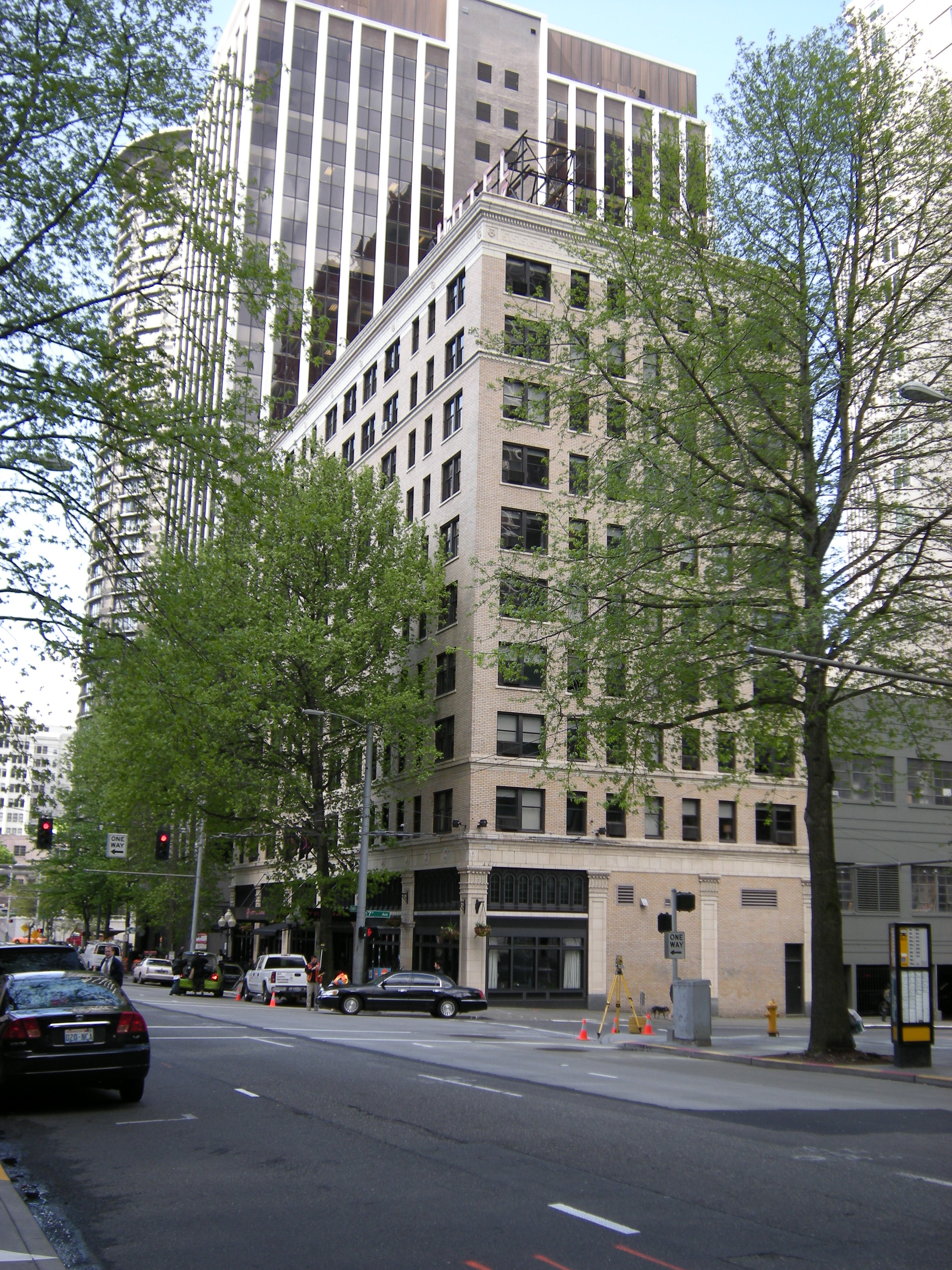
Miller's Guild was housed in Hotel Max (pictured in 2009) from 2013 to 2021

The restaurant Miller's Guild served American cuisine in Seattle's Hotel Max. The Oregonian described the restaurant as a modern steakhouse. Seattle Metropolitan said Miller's Guide was "like a cave designed by Martha Stewart: lights low, lines classic, firewood stacked at the entrance, flames leaping brightly out of the custom-built nine-foot grill in back". The menu included dry-aged beef and local seafood. The brunch menu included coffee flour waffle, bacon white chocolate bread pudding, and buttermilk fried chicken and biscuits. The restaurant served three Bloody Mary varieties: a classic, a "Beety Bloody" (beet juice, sweet onion, goat cheese foam, pickled egg), and a "Smokey, Meaty, Bloody" (ancho chiles, beef stock, and tomato juice, garnished with bacon, beef jerky, and fennel).

== History ==
The restaurant opened in December 2013. Miller's Guild was owned by Nicole Wilson. Jason Wilson was the original chef. Jake Kosseff has also been credited as a co-founder. The restaurant launched weekend brunch in 2015. The restaurant closed in 2021, during the COVID-19 pandemic.

== Reception ==
In 2015, Jason Price of Eater Seattle wrote, "Walking into Miller's Guild in downtown Seattle is akin to entering a huge iron forge. But instead of hearing the clanking of hammers on anvils, you smell the primal odor of grilled meat, and hear the roaring fire and sweet sound of searing flesh. Grab a seat in front of the massive wood-fired oven and it's a near-medieval experience—and one that shouldn't be missed if you are to eat meat in Seattle." Laurie Wolf said the restaurant "serves excellent food and great, potent cocktails".

== See also ==
- List of defunct restaurants of the United States
