= Rob Roy (bar) =

Bar in Seattle, Washington, U.S.

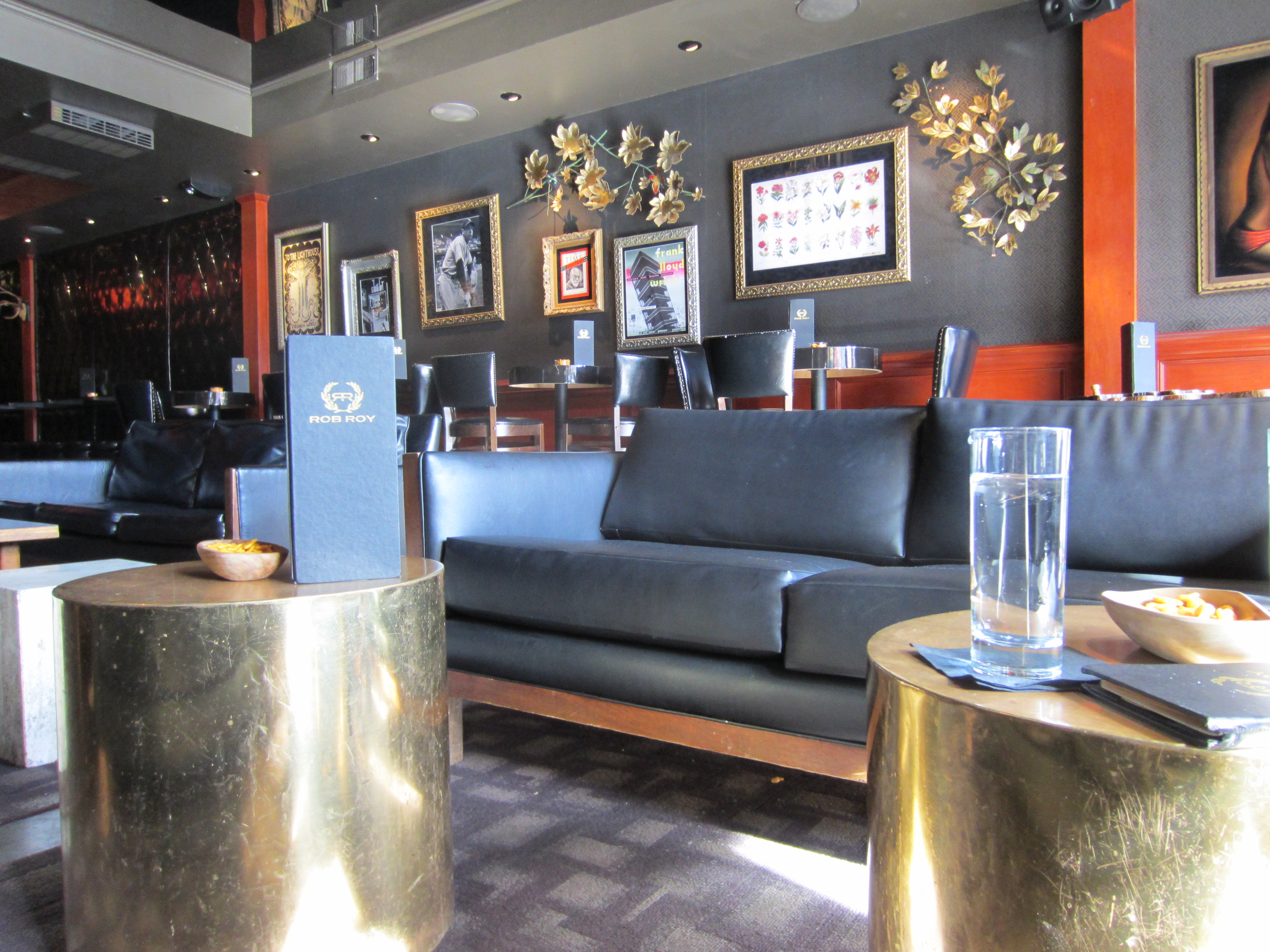
- The bar's interior, 2012
- Interactive map of Rob Roy

Restaurant information
- Location: Seattle, King, Washington, United States
- Coordinates: 47°36′53.3″N 122°20′47.8″W
- Website: robroyseattle.com

Rob Roy is a bar in Seattle's Belltown neighborhood, in the U.S. state of Washington. Owned by Anu Apte the business received a James Beard Foundation Award nomination in the Outstanding Bar category in 2023. Vinnie's Raw Bar has been described as a "sibling" establishment.
