= Nue (restaurant) =

Restaurant in Seattle, Washington, U.S.

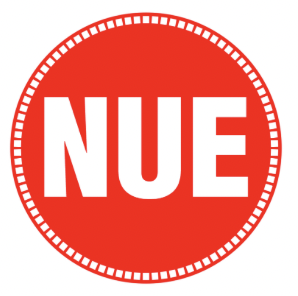

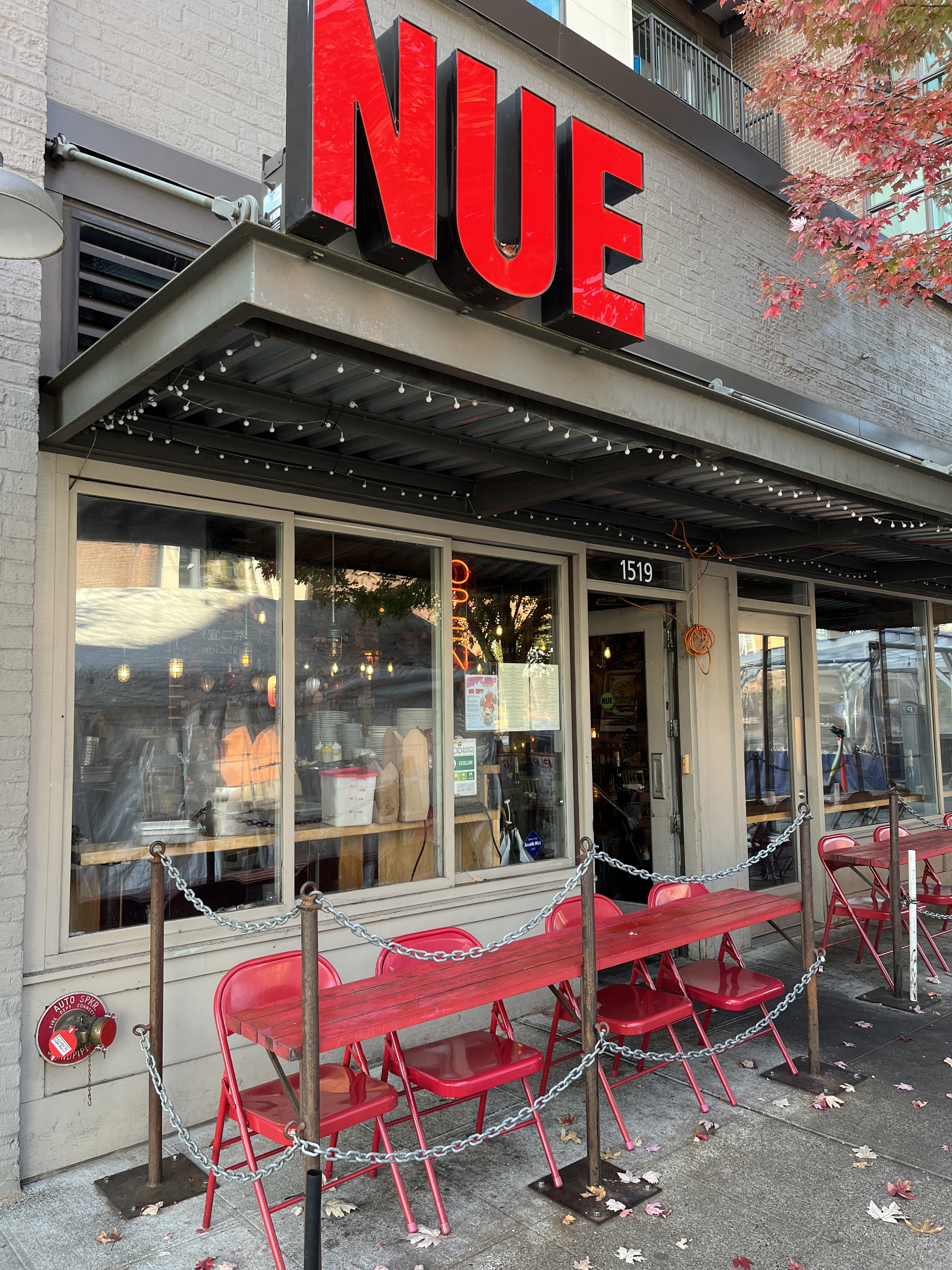
- The restaurant's exterior, 2022
- Interactive map of Nue

Restaurant information
- Location: 1519 14th Ave, Seattle, King, Washington, 98122, United States
- Coordinates: 47°36′53″N 122°18′52″W

Nue is an Asian Pacific American-owned restaurant on Seattle's Capitol Hill, in the U.S. state of Washington. Uyên Nguyễn is a co-owner.

== Description and reception ==
Eater Seattle has described the restaurant as an "internationally-inspired street food spot". The menu has included Latvian smoked sprats, Trinidad goat curry, and Romanian mititei.

Aimee Rizzo of The Infatuation wrote in 2018, "Nue specializes in global street food. That means you can eat Chinese, Middle Eastern, South African, Burmese, Southeast Asian, Jamaican, Latin dishes and more here." She opined, " everything here is great". In 2018, Kim Holcomb of KING-TV said the restaurant is "home to arguably the most adventurous brunch in all of Seattle", serving foods from China, Israel, Mexico, the Netherlands, the Philippines, Puerto Rico, South Africa, and Syria.

Thrillist has said, "Try your hand at some of the best street foods from around the world at this Capitol Hill spot... A must-try sandwich is the Japanese Katsu: panko-breaded pork loin on crustless white bread with Kewpie mayo and Tonkatsu sauce. With Nue, you have the chance to nosh on rare global eats -- without a passport."
