= D'Ambrosio Gelato =

Gelato producer and retailer based in Seattle, Washington, U.S.

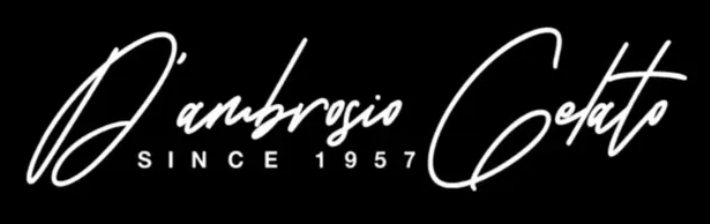

Restaurant information
- Food type: Gelato
- Location: United States

D'Ambrosio Gelato is a gelato producer and retailer based in Seattle, in the U.S. state of Washington.

== History and locations ==
The Ballard location, which opened in 2010, has an espresso bar and serves affogato. A location opened on Capitol Hill in 2012. It had closed by 2015, and was replaced by the restaurant Nakamura. Plans for a location at Bellevue Square were announced in 2013.

Enzo D'Ambrosio is the owner. Rebecca and Jordan Barrows took over the Ballard shop in 2016.
