= Dino's Tomato Pie =

Pizzeria in Seattle, Washington, U.S.

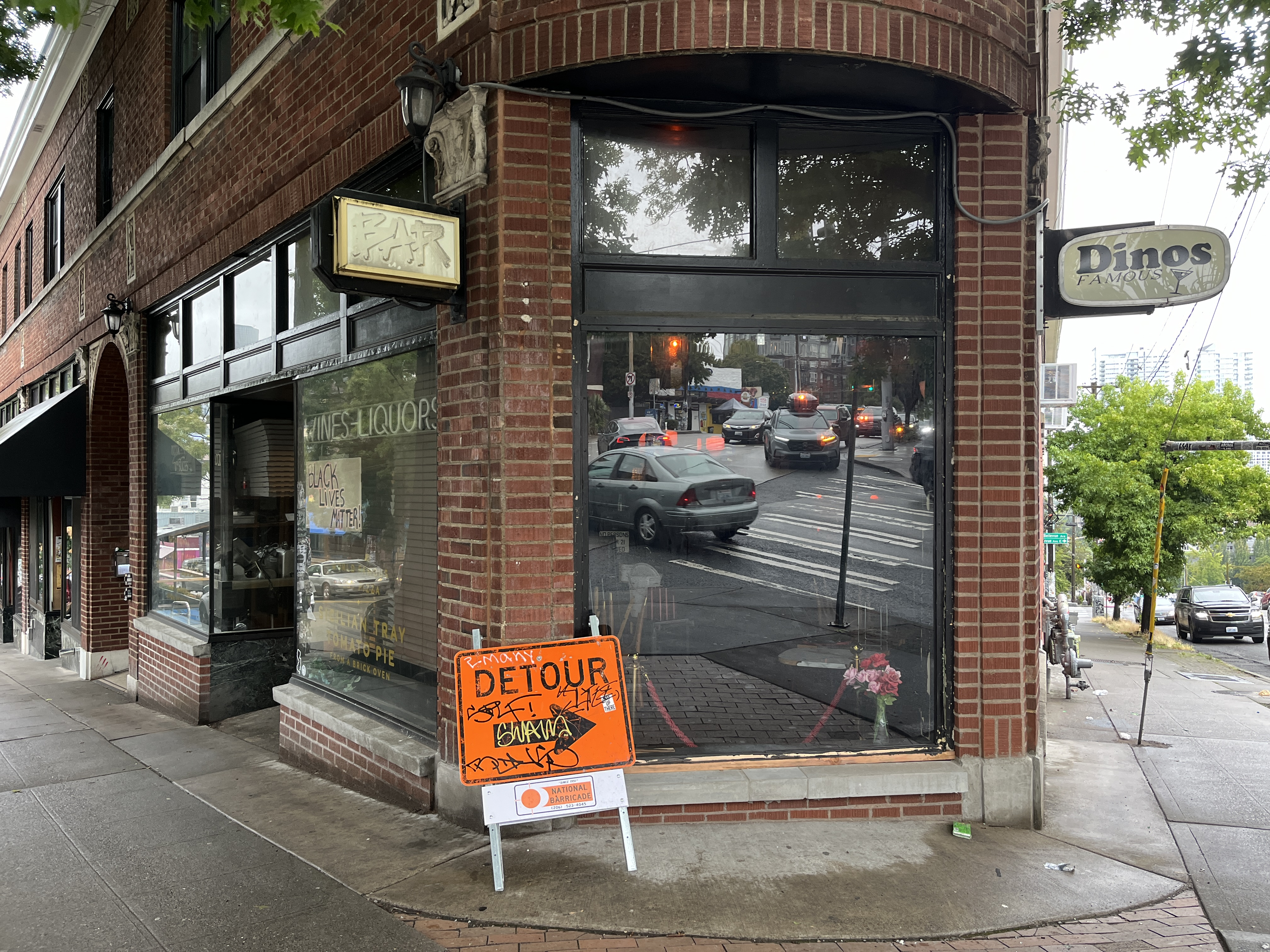
- The restaurant's exterior, 2024
- Interactive map of Dino's Tomato Pie

Restaurant information
- Food type: Italian
- Location: 1524 East Olive Way, Seattle, King, Washington, 98122, United States
- Coordinates: 47.6184°N 122.3259°W
- Website: dinostomatopie.com

Dino's Tomato Pie is a pizzeria in Seattle, in the U.S. state of Washington.

== Description ==
The pizzeria Dino's Tomato Pie operates on Seattle's Capitol Hill and specializes in square-shaped, Sicilian pizza. The interior has mirrored walls and wooden booths. The Mr. Pink is a Jersey-style pizza with vodka sauce, mozzarella, ricotta, and basil. The restaurant also serves garlic knots and cocktails such as a Negroni.

== History ==
Plans for the restaurant were announced in 2015.

== Reception ==
Aimee Rizzo and Kayla Sager-Riley included Dino's in The Infatuation's 2024 overview of Seattle's best pizza.
