= Joe's Bar and Grill =

Dive bar in Seattle, Washington, U.S.

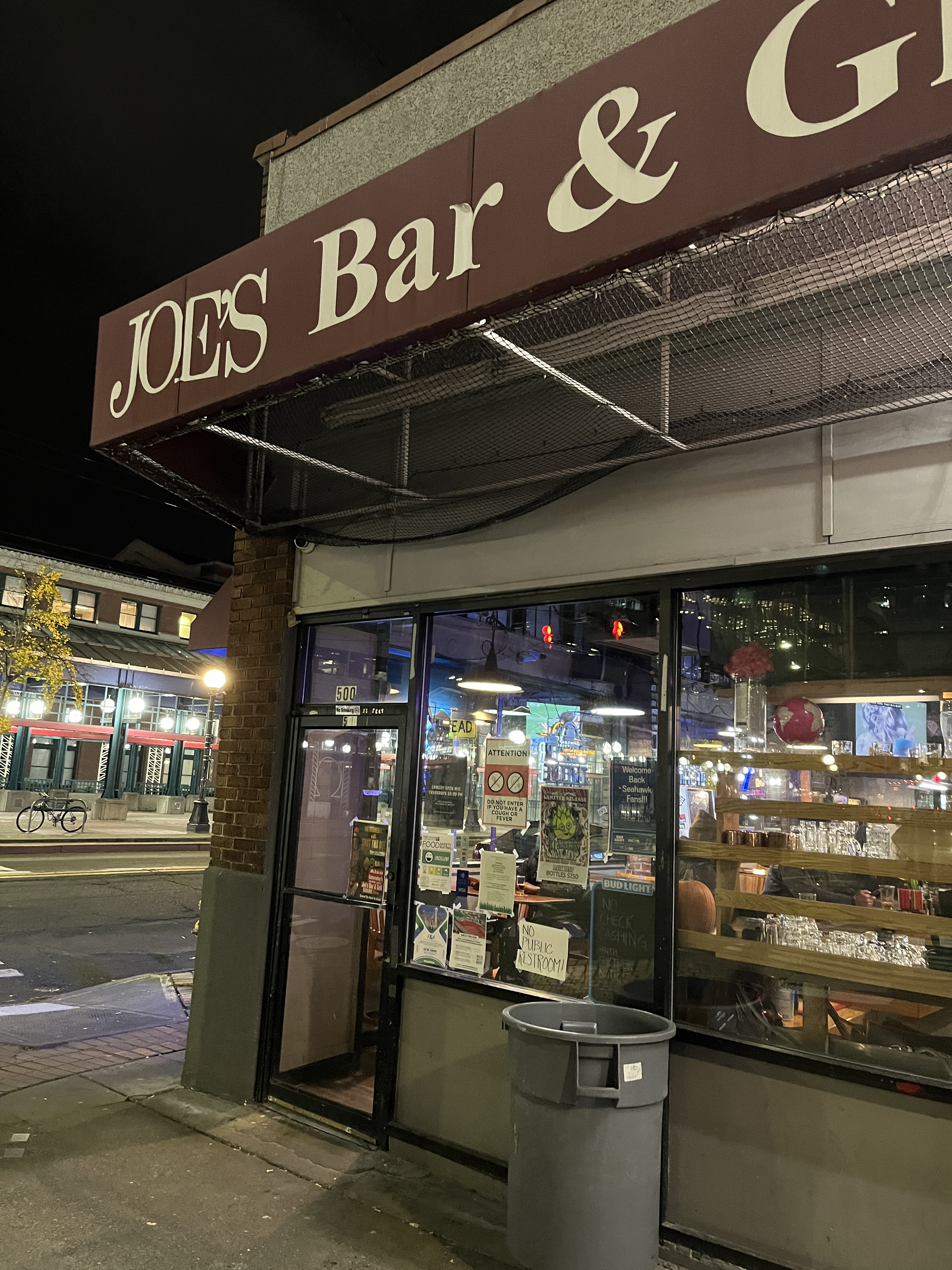
- The bar's exterior, 2022
- Interactive map of Joe's Bar and Grill

Restaurant information
- Location: 500 S King Street, Seattle, King, Washington, 98104, United States
- Coordinates: 47.5985°N 122.3275°W

Joe's Bar and Grill is a dive bar in Seattle's Chinatown–International District, in the U.S. state of Washington.

== Description ==
Joe's Bar and Grill is a dive bar at the intersection of Fifth Avenue and South King Street in Seattle's Chinatown–International District. Seattle Weekly has called the business "a roughneck oasis in the International District". Curbed has described the bar as a "classic dive" with fried food, beer, and pull-tabs. Joe's has a sign which reads, "You aren't really drunk if you can lie on the floor without holding on."

In 2016, Tan Vinh of The Seattle Times wrote: "The city's most crowded bar before 11 a.m., this corner dive ... draws drunks, day laborers, graveyard-shift workers and on game day, Seahawks fans. Whiskey shots are filled to the rim and come with complimentary beer chasers".

== History ==
The bar signed a "good-neighbor agreement" c. 2006. In 2021, a bartender was attacked after asking a guest for proof of COVID-19 vaccination.

== Reception ==
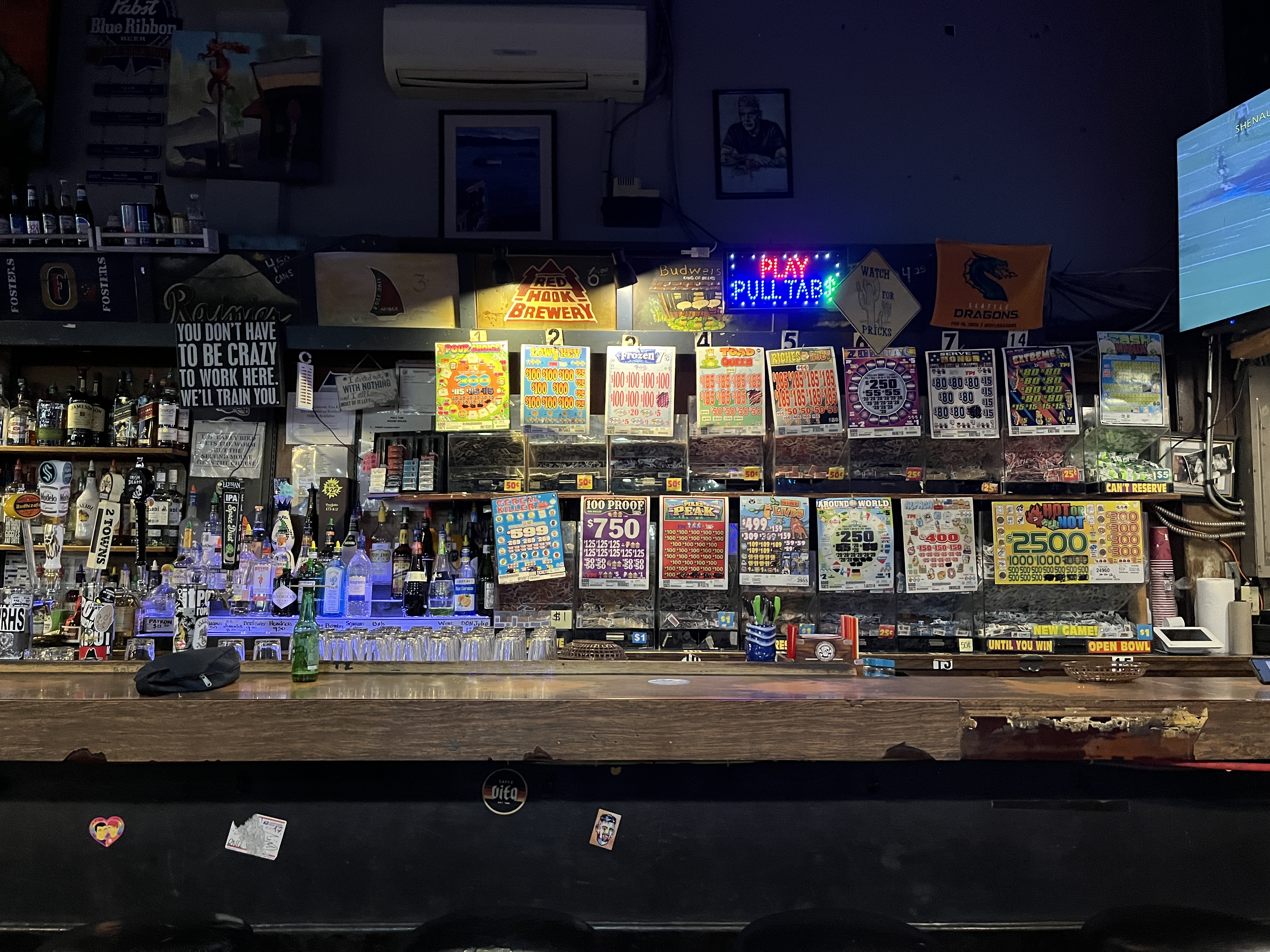
The bar's interior in 2022

Mike Seely included Joe's in Seattle Weekly's 2009 overview of the city's ten "most intimidating" dive bars. He described the business as "a shabby oasis of downtrodden Americana in Seattle's bustling Chinatown" and wrote, "During lunch hour in the middle of the week, the bar is populated by maybe a dozen patrons. The smell of unwashed ass and armpit sweat in the air is so thick I could cut it, but that's par for the course at Joe's."

In 2010, Seely said Joe's was the city's "top hobo bar" and wrote, "In fairness, Joe's, which sits across from the ID's bus and rail (both preferred means of transport for actual hobos) tunnel entrance, has taken some steps in the past couple of years to make itself more attractive to non-hobos. There are a few digital television sets, tuned to sports. There's also an awning with its name on it, which includes the respectable sounding 'bar & grill.' If a Foreman counts, then, by George, they've got a grill."

Tan Vinh included Joe's in The Seattle Times' 2016 overview of "great Seattle-area bars to celebrate before they're gone", writing: "So maybe posting Friday's Sloppy Joe special near the Tums isn't the best sales pitch. Maybe this is the city's grittiest bar. But Joe's can be endearing in all of its imperfections. It holds no pretense and accepts that sometimes in life, we're dealt a bad hand and need an escape without judgment."

In Death Confetti, Jennifer Robin wrote, "You cannot miss Joe's Bar. You cannot miss the neon in the windows, and the open doors, where men spill onto the sidewalk in rumpled raingear, wizard outfits, and all of those T-shirts that feature Joe Camel and choppers and American flags." In Drenched (2015), Mark Mcall said the bar offers "a divey good time".

== See also ==
- List of dive bars
