= Moonrise Bakery =

Shop in Seattle, Washington, U.S.

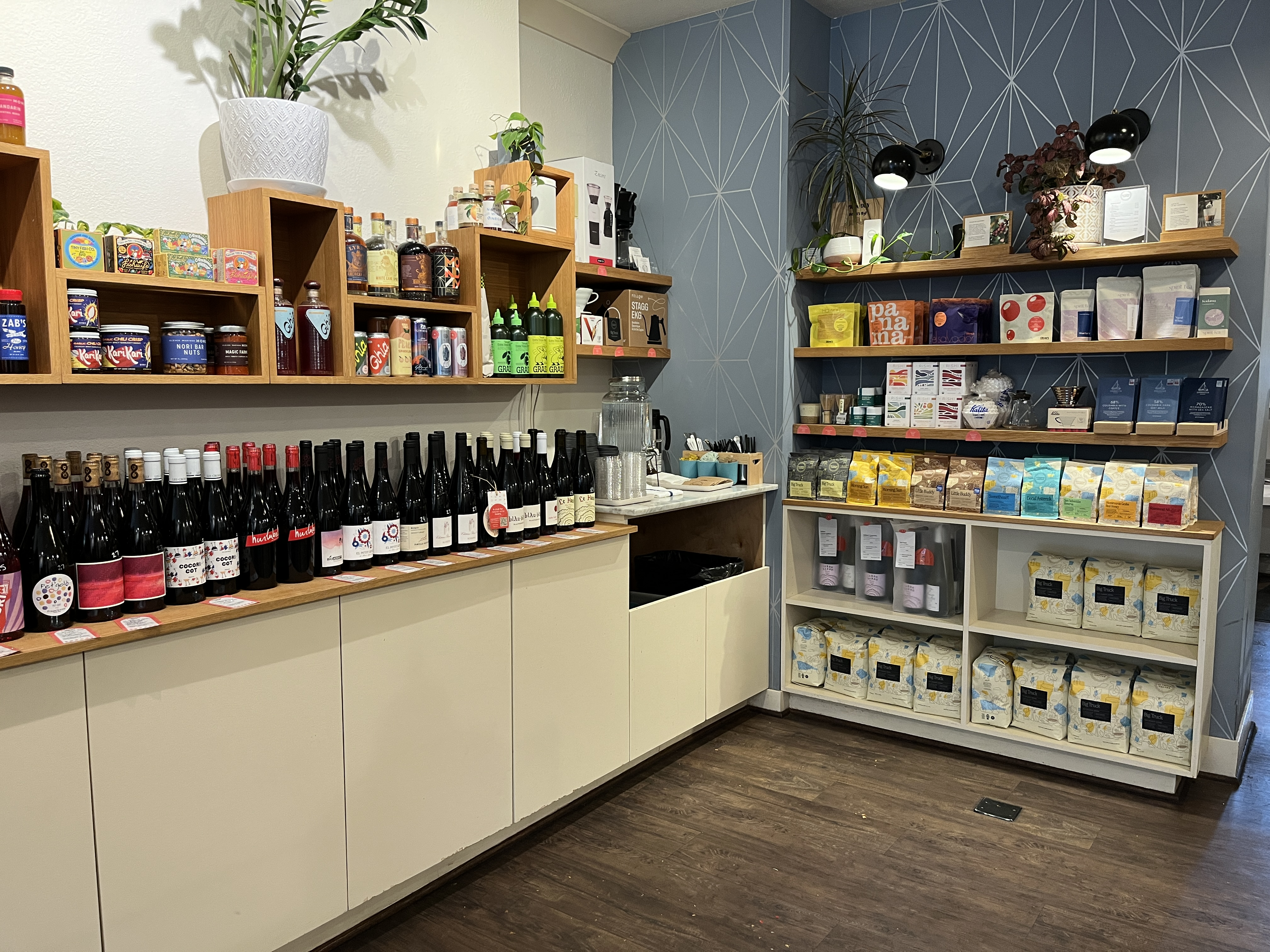
- The shop's interior, 2024
- Interactive map of Moonrise Bakery

Restaurant information
- Location: 1805 Queen Anne Avenue N, Seattle, King, Washington, 98109, United States
- Coordinates: 47.6350°N 122.3572°W
- Website: moonrise-bakery.com

Moonrise Bakery is a bakery in Seattle's Queen Anne neighborhood, in the U.S. state of Washington. It opened in 2021, after Olympia Coffee Roasting Co. purchased Le Reve Bakery in 2020 and completed a rebrand and remodel. The shop supplies pastries and other baked goods to Olympia Coffee locations throughout the region.

== Description and history ==
Moonrise Bakery operates in Seattle's Queen Anne neighborhood. It is a sibling brand to Olympia Coffee Roasting Co., which is co-owned by Sam Schroeder and Oliver Stormshak and acquired Le Reve Bakery from owner Andrea Nakata in July 2020, during the COVID-19 pandemic. The shop was rebranded and remodeled, opening in 2021. It serves a retail outlet and also supplies pastries and other baked goods to six Olympia Coffee outlets in Olympia, Seattle, and Tacoma.

Moonrise Bakery has outdoor seating, a patio with a glass ceiling, and spaces for bicycles. It serves baked goods such as cookies, croissants (including a twice-baked almond variety), kouign-amann, lemon olive oil cake, and pain au chocolat, as well as stuffed brioches, pizza, and soups. The bakery also has natural wines.

== See also ==
- List of bakeries
