= Ramen Danbo =

Restaurant chain

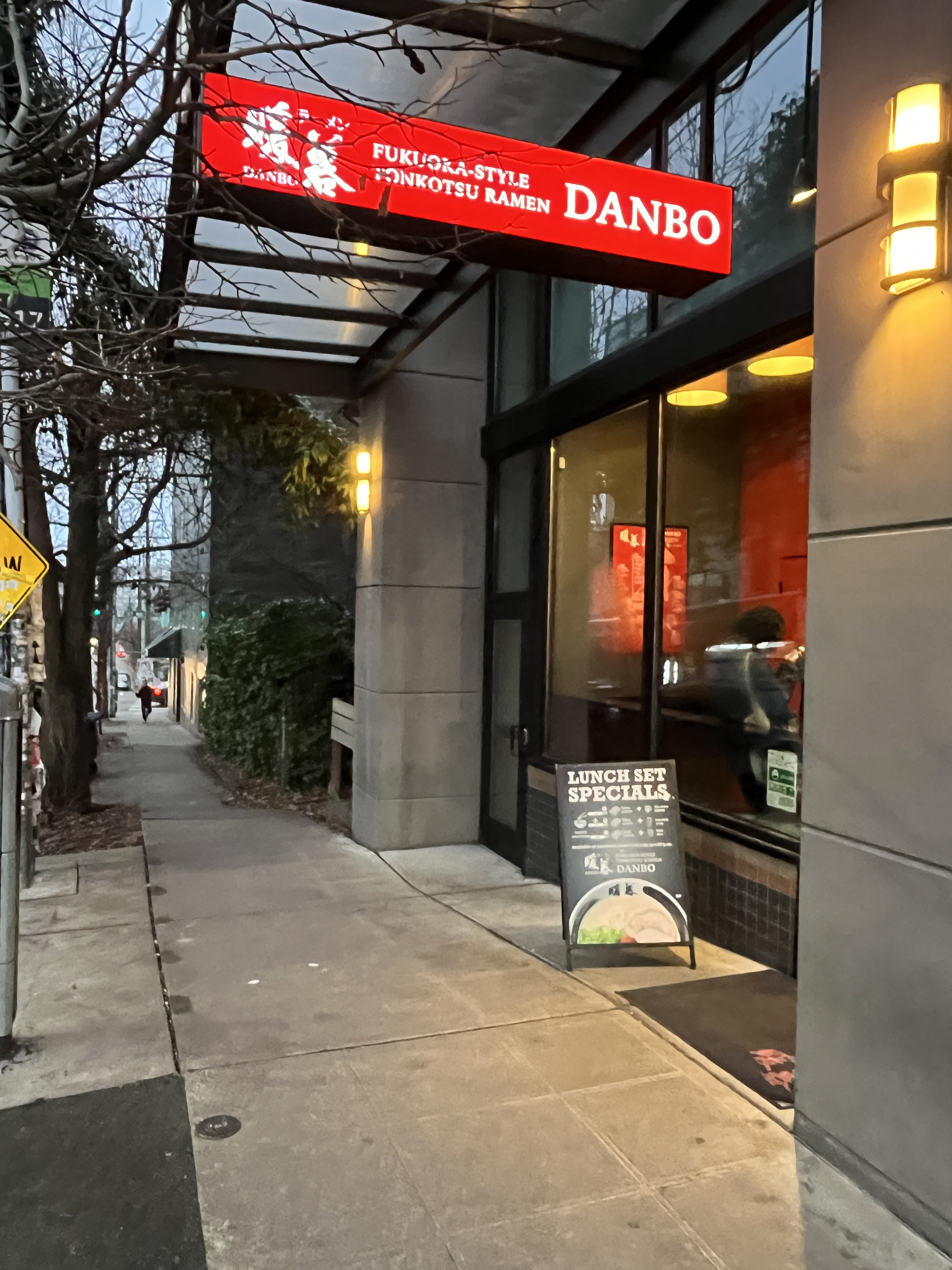
- Exterior of the restaurant in Seattle in 2023

Restaurant information
- Food type: Japanese
- Other locations: Vancouver; New York; Seattle

Ramen Danbo is a Japanese restaurant chain. There are locations in New York, Seattle, and Vancouver.

== Reception ==
Ramen Danbo had the highest Yelp rating in Washington in 2022. Jay Friedman included the business in Eater Seattle's 2024 overview of eight "brilliant" ramen restaurants in the metropolitan area.

== See also ==
- List of Japanese restaurants
