= Pancita (restaurant) =

Mexican restaurant in Seattle, Washington, U.S.

- Interactive map of Pancita

Restaurant information
- Food type: Mexican
- Location: 5501 30th Avenue NE, Seattle, Washington, 98105, United States
- Coordinates: 47°40′7″N 122°17′43″W

Pancita is a Mexican restaurant in Seattle, in the U.S. state of Washington.

In 2024, Pancita earned Janet Becerra a nomination in the Emerging Chef category of the James Beard Foundation Awards.

== See also ==
- List of Mexican restaurants
