= Husky Deli =

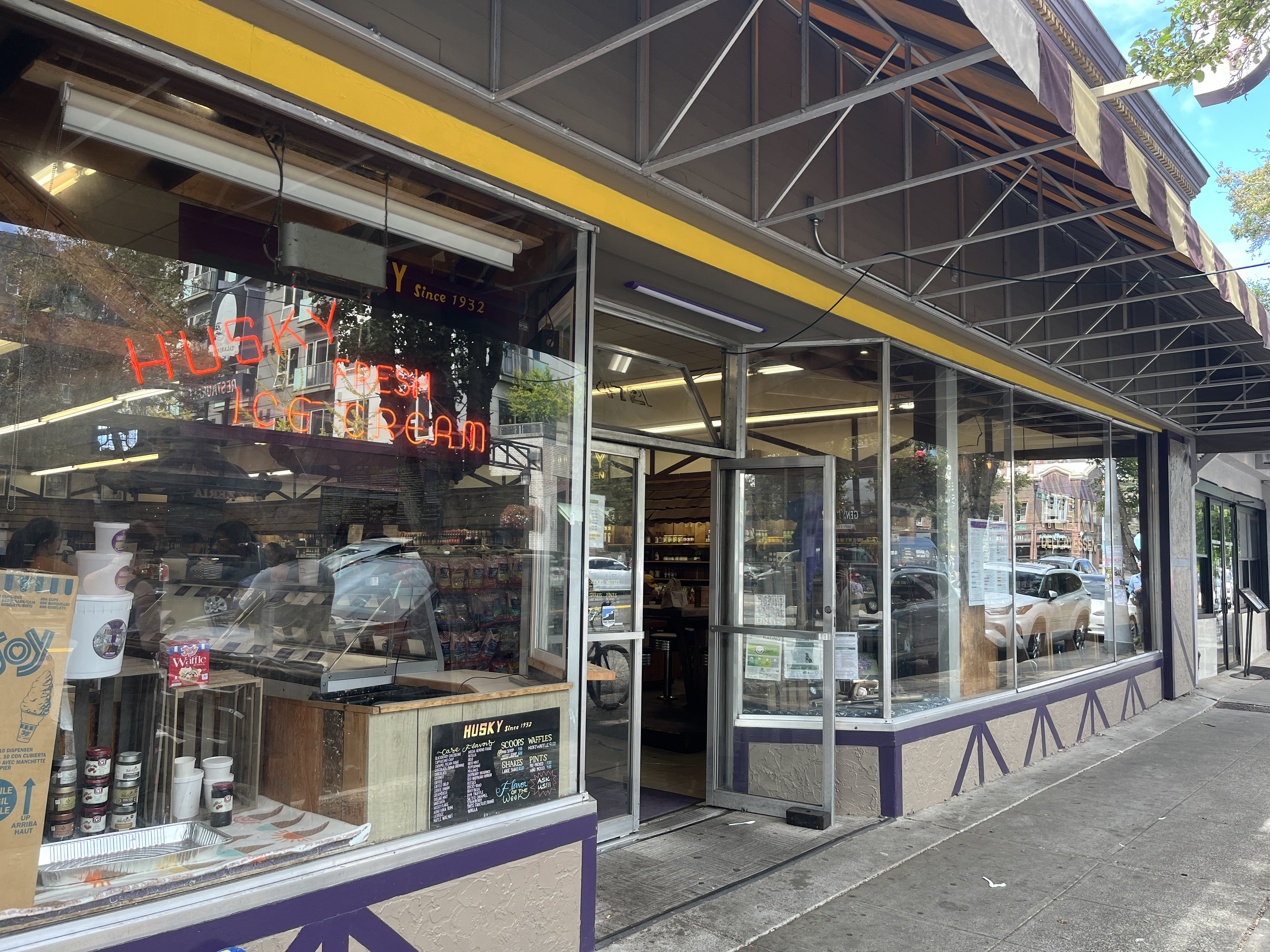
- Exterior, 2026
- Interactive map of Husky Deli

Restaurant information
- Location: 4721 California Avenue Southwest, Seattle, King, Washington, 98116, United States
- Coordinates: 47°33′38″N 122°23′13″W
- Website: huskydeli.com

Husky Deli is a restaurant in Seattle, in the U.S. state of Washington. Established as the Edgewood Farm Store by Herman Miller, the business has operated in West Seattle since 1932 or 1933.

== Description ==
The Not for Tourists Guide to Seattle says Husky Deli is an "old-fashioned deli counter" with homemade ice cream. In addition to dozens of ice cream varieties, the deli and market offer sandwiches, meats, cheeses, and other desserts, as well as coffee drinks.

== Reception ==
Fodor's has called Husky Deli "a Seattle icon". The author of Everybody Loves Ice Cream (2004) calls the business a "local landmark".
