= Tavern Law =

Bar in Seattle, Washington, U.S.

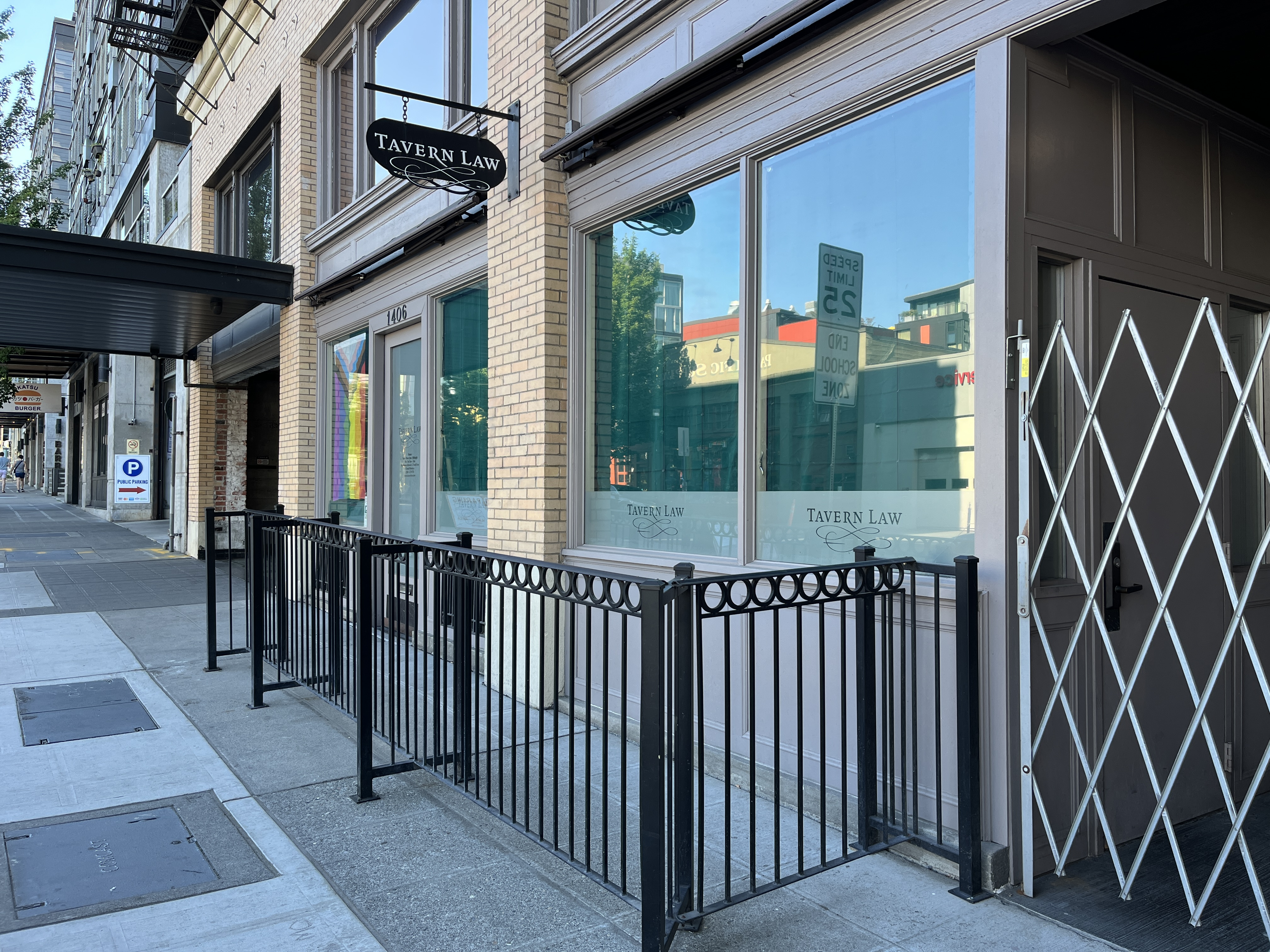
- The bar's exterior, 2024
- Interactive map of Tavern Law

Restaurant information
- Established: 2009
- Location: 1406 12th Avenue, Seattle, King, Washington, United States
- Coordinates: 47°36′48″N 122°19′0″W

Tavern Law is a bar on Seattle's Capitol Hill, in the U.S. state of Washington. Brian McCracken and Dana Tough opened the speakeasy-themed establishment in 2009. A sibling bar Needle & Thread is accessed via Tavern Law.

== Description ==
The speakeasy-themed bar Tavern Law operates in the Trace Lofts building (1919) on Seattle's Capitol Hill. One published walking guide of the city has described the bar as a "very inconspicuous neo-speakeasy", and another guide by Moon Publications has said Tavern Law has an "old timey-theme" with vintage drink recipes. The business is named after the 1832 law that legalized alcohol consumption in public establishments.

The dark interior has a long, curved bar, as well as a "secret" upstairs bar called Needle & Thread, which is accessible by calling a staff member from a telephone booth. There is also a mural of a woman, shelves with old law books, and vintage typewriters.

The drink menu has approximately forty cocktails. The pink-colored 7 Star Cooler is a moonshine cocktail with lime juice and soda water.

== History ==
Brian McCracken and Dana Tough opened the bar in 2009.

== Reception ==
The Not for Tourists Guide to Seattle has called the bar "speakeasy chic".
