= Sam's Tavern =

Restaurant in the U.S. state of Washington

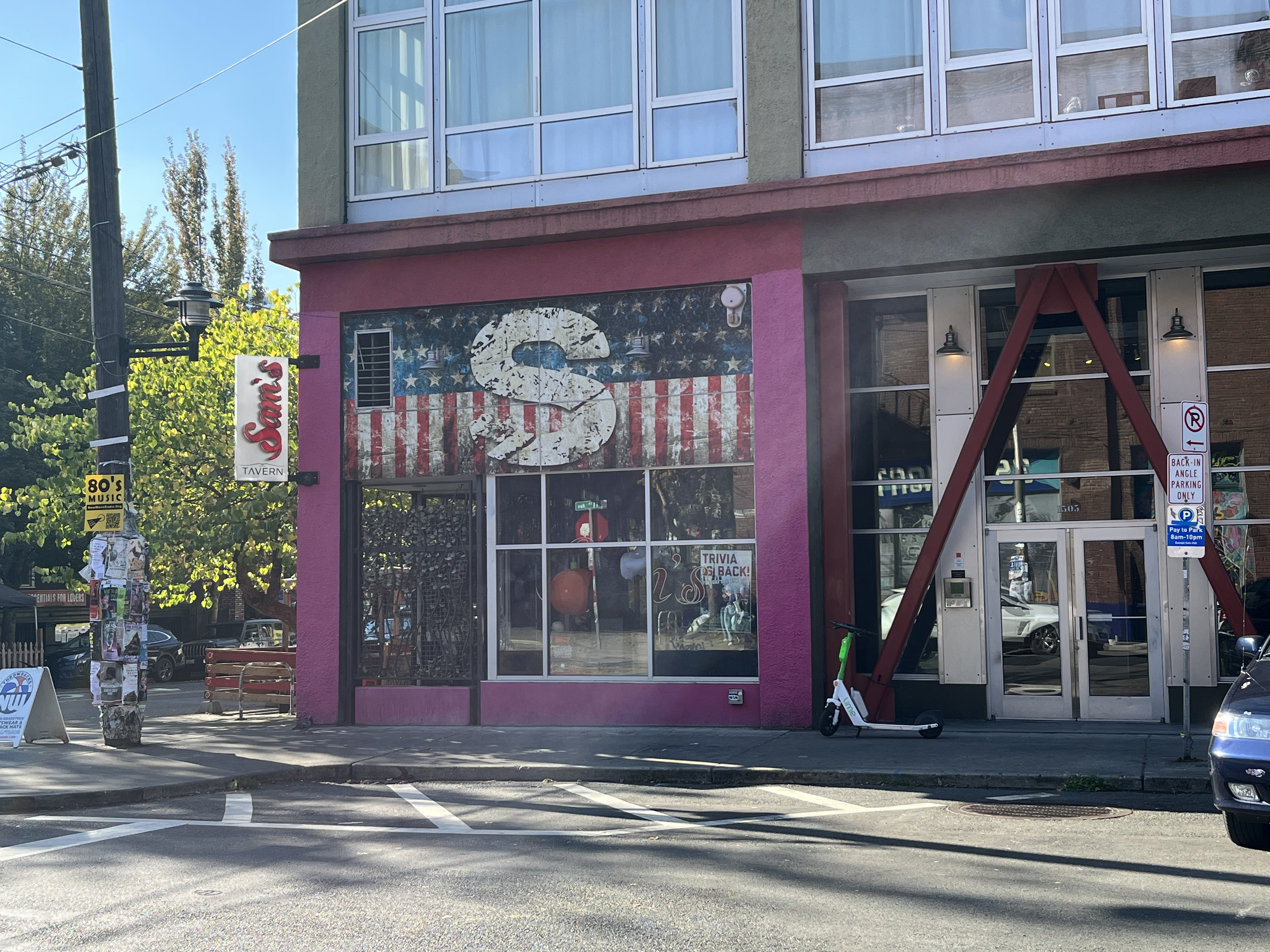
- Exterior of the Capitol Hill location, 2022

Restaurant information
- Location: Bellevue; Seattle, King, Washington, United States
- Website: samstavernseattle.com

Sam's Tavern is a restaurant with multiple locations in the Seattle metropolitan area, in the U.S. state of Washington. The business is owned by James Snyder.

== Description and history ==
Thrillist says, "Sam's Tavern is a tribute to an old bar – the dive that became the original Red Robin – and gets its old-timey roadhouse feel from an owner whose family started those colorfully descriptive bird-themed burger joints."

The business operates in Bellevue, Capitol Hill, and South Lake Union; previously, Sam's Tavern also operated in Redmond. In 2021, all Sam's restaurants closed temporarily after a bartender at the Bellevue location was shot and killed at work by her estranged spouse.

The Capitol Hill location has hosted trivia night. The South Lake Union restaurant had covered outdoor seating during the COVID-19 lockdowns.

== Reception ==
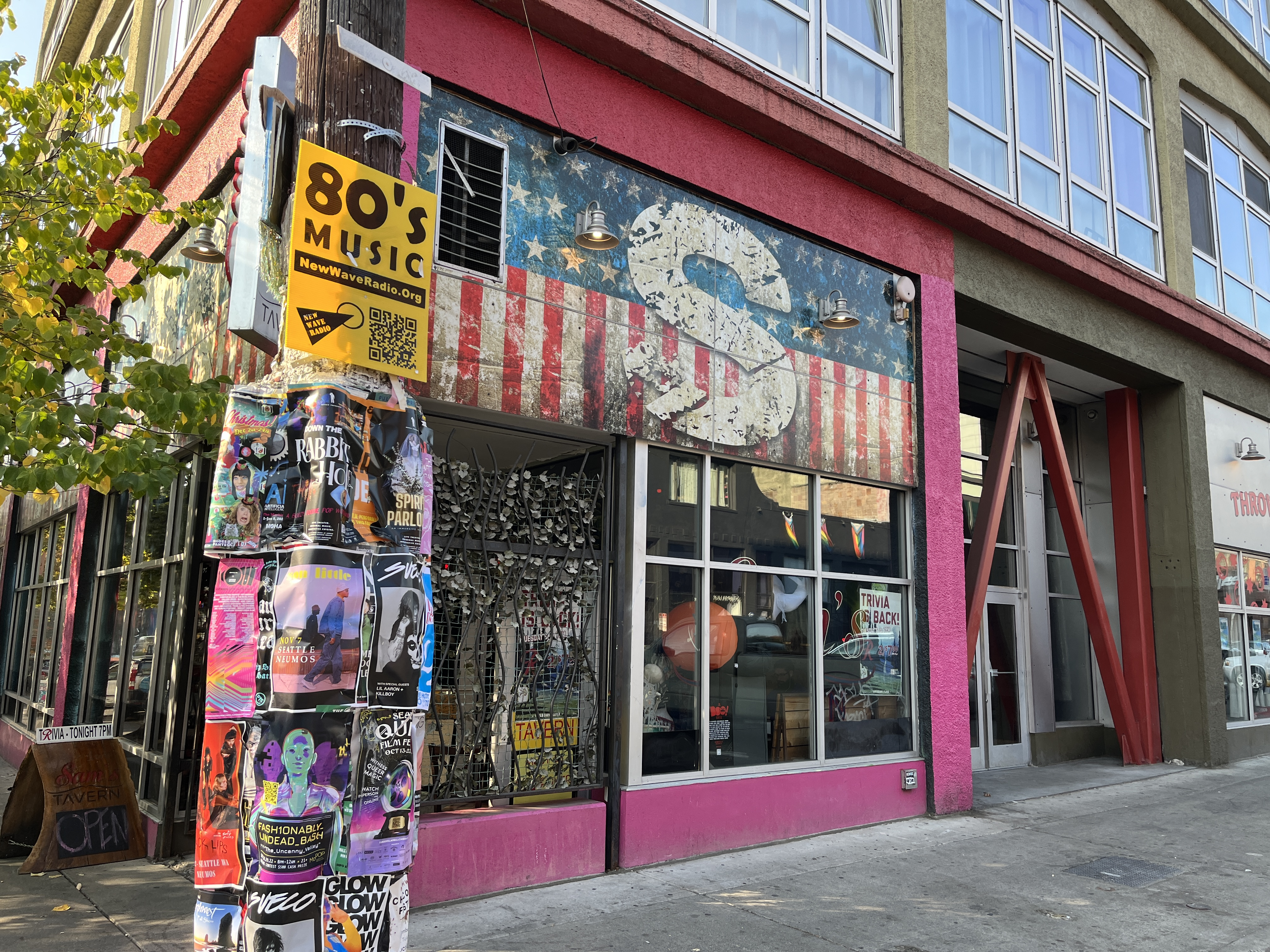
The Capitol Hill bar, 2022

Chona Kasinger included Sam's Tavern in Thrillist's 2014 list of Seattle's eight best Bloody Marys, writing: "The supposed originator of our beloved Red Robin, Capitol Hill's Sam's Tavern garnishes their Bloody Marys with pickled asparagus, a mini kabob of tomato, cheese, sausage, and… drumroll please… lunch, in the form of a slider. Oh, and did we mention it's made with bacon-flavored vodka?!" Larry Bleiberg included Sam's Tavern in USA Today's 2015 list of the ten best Bloody Marys "to start the New Year".

Taylor Rock and Dan Myers included the business in The Daily Meal's 2020 list of "The Best Burger in Every State", writing: "Sam's Tavern has 12 gourmet burgers, but there is one in particular that's perfect for all you bacon fans out there: Sam's 50 Burger. The patty is half certified Angus beef and half hickory-smoked bacon, topped with avocado, buttermilk bacon ranch dressing, Gouda and more bacon. Sam's is also known for its stellar Bloody Marys, a classic cocktail with an interesting origin story."
