= Hot Mama's Pizza =

Pizzeria in Seattle, Washington, U.S.

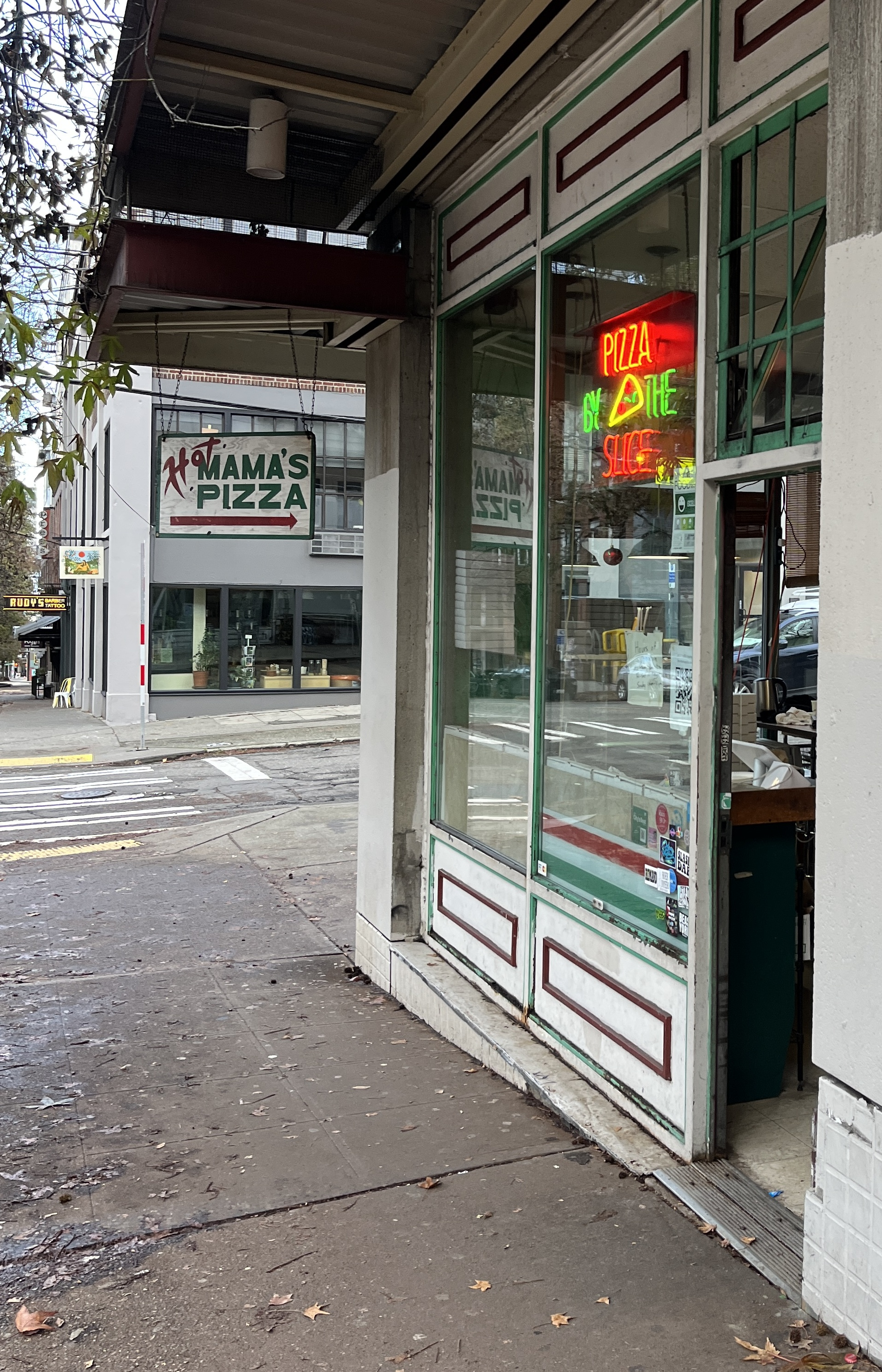
- The shop's exterior, 2022
- Interactive map of Hot Mama's Pizza

Restaurant information
- Established: 1995
- Owner: David Nelson
- Previous owner: Krista Nelson
- Location: 700 East Pine Street, Seattle, King, Washington, 98122, United States
- Coordinates: 47.6154°N 122.3232°W
- Website: hot-mamaspizza.com

Hot Mama's Pizza is a pizzeria on Seattle's Capitol Hill, in the U.S. state of Washington. Established in 1995, the business was co-owned by David and Krista Nelson, until her death in 2023. Hot Mama's has garnered a generally positive reception.

== Description ==
Hot Mama's Pizza operates in on Pine Street, on Seattle's Capitol Hill. Stand-up comedians have worked at the shop.

== History ==
Hot Mama's opened in 1995. Spouses David and Krista Nelson co-owned the pizzeria, until Krista's death in 2023. The business said in a statement, "Her contribution to the restaurant cannot be understated. She was the glue that held us all together."

== Reception ==
In Eater Seattle's 2014 list of ten "iconic" pizzerias in the city "to try before you die", Sara Billups wrote: "Good sober and great after a few cocktails, Hot Mama's has been filling stomachs of the young and hungry after hours for almost two decades. Slices are so big that ends hang off plates. Size isn't everything, but those in search of the cheap, hot, and gooey will find happiness (before heartburn) here." The website's Julia Wayne said the pesto sauce and cheese pizzas "are consistently amazing". In 2020, during the COVID-19 pandemic, Eater Seattle included the business in an overview of the city's top pizzerias for delivery and take-out. The website said of Hot Mama's: "Inspired by New York, made in Seattle, this pizza is great, cheap, and perfectly greasy any time of day."

Seattle Metropolitan says, "Hole-in-the-wall Mama's staves off your post-club munchies with foldable slices and indulges your voyeuristic tendencies with a better people-watching scene than the airport." The Not for Tourists Guide to Seattle has said the pizzeria is where a "gargantuan, foldable slice costs less than a bus ride", as well as: "Everything looks hotter with beer goggles on." In the student publication for Seattle Central College, Nguyet Nguyen recommended the shop in a 2018 list of "student-friendly" eateries on Capitol Hill. Ana Bungag recommended Hot Mama's in a 2021 list of the top five "budget-friendly" restaurants near the campus.

In The Stranger's 2018 search for Seattle's best slice, Jake Uitti ranked Hot Mama's sixth and wrote, "Sadly, the dry and rigid crust kept us from finishing our order... While the service and vibe were pleasant enough, our three cheese slices a mere $8.85, and the wait to get the slices short, the overall product was not great". The Seattle Times has said the pesto slice has "an herbaceous, green base confidently announcing itself from underneath a chewy layer of bubbly, golden-brown mozzarella and salty feta crumbles". The newspaper also said, "the crunchy, thick crust isn't as foldable as those of its East Coast cousins, but it has helped fill the pizza-shaped hole in my heart after nights of misadventure".
