= Taurus Ox (restaurant) =

Restaurant in Seattle, Washington, U.S.

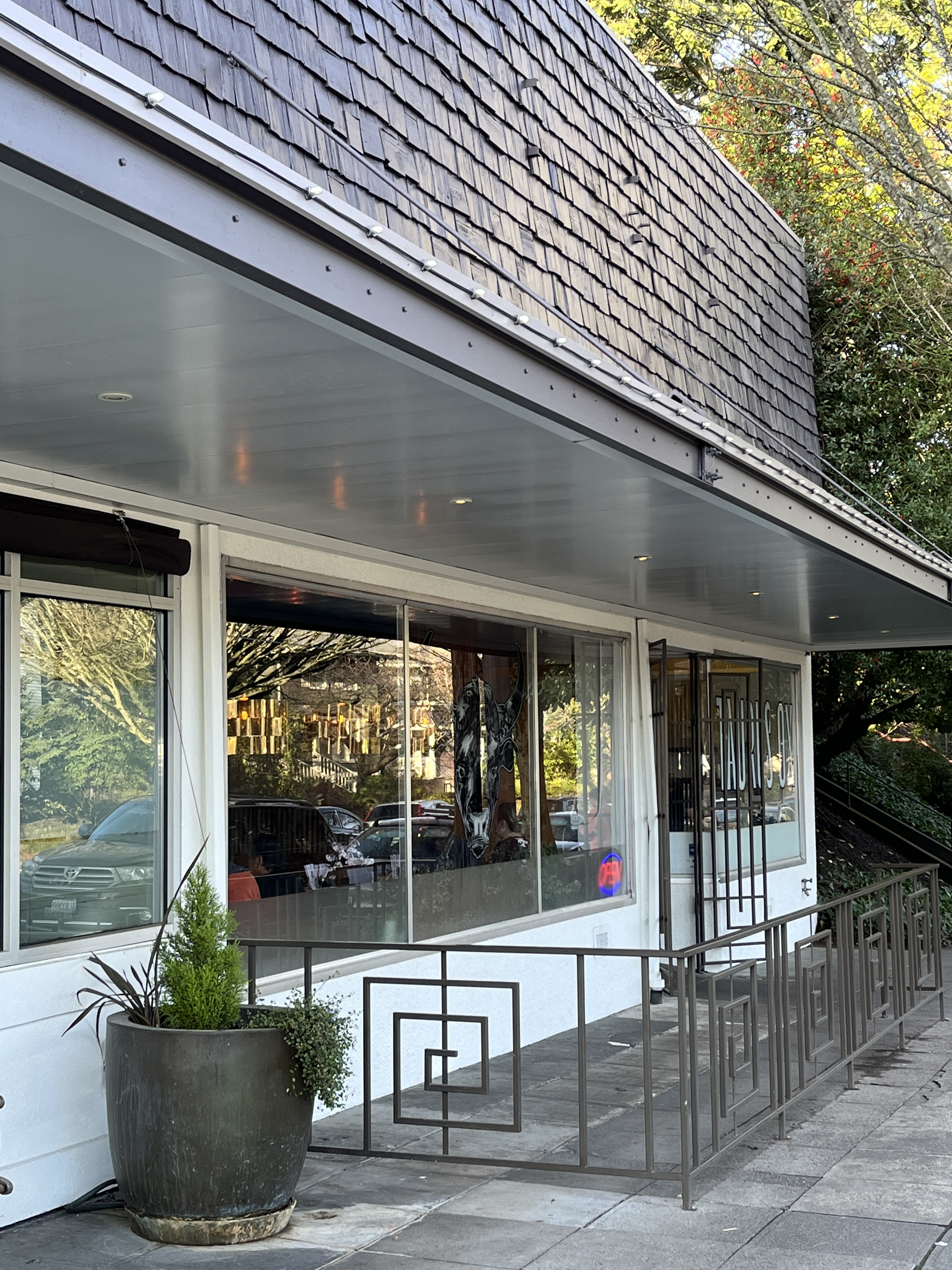
- The restaurant's exterior, 2023
- Interactive map of Taurus Ox

Restaurant information
- Food type: Lao
- Location: 903 19th Avenue E, Seattle, Washington, 98122, United States
- Coordinates: 47.6271°N 122.3076°W
- Website: taurusox.com

Taurus Ox is a Lao restaurant in Seattle, in the U.S. state of Washington. The restaurant launched another called Ox Burger.

== Description ==
Taurus Ox is a restaurant serving Lao cuisine in Seattle's Capitol Hill neighborhood. The menu has included sausage, khao soi, phad lao, papaya salad, thom khem, chicken laap, and sticky rice wine.

== History ==
Taurus Ox opened in December 2019, in a space which previously housed Little Uncle. The restaurant was vandalized in 2020. Sydney Clark, Khampaeng Panyathong, and Jenessa Sneva are chefs as of 2022.

=== Ox Burger ===
Taurus Ox's original location was turned into Ox Burger. Ox Burger has been described as an "offshoot" and an "outpost" of Taurus Ox. Jay Friedman included Ox Burger in Eater Seattle's 2023 list of "16 Spots for Mind-Blowing Burgers in Seattle".

== Reception ==
Allecia Vermillion included the business in Seattle Metropolitan's 2021 list of "The Best Restaurants on Capitol Hill" and wrote, "Taurus Ox makes, indisputably, one of the best burgers in town, a pair of proper smash patties, two versions of the condiment jeaw, house-cured pork jowl in place of bacon. It's cross-culturally clever and drive-across-town good." Vermillion also included the restaurant in a list of "The Best Burgers in Seattle". The magazine included Taurus Ox in a 2022 list of "Seattle's 100 Best Restaurants". Naomi Tomky included the restaurant in Thrillist's 2021 list of "The 14 Best Burger Joints in Seattle".

Gabe Guarente, Mark Van Streefkerk, and Jade Yamazaki Stewart included Taurus Ox in Eater Seattle's 2022 list of "25 Essential Capitol Hill Restaurants" and said "the smash burger made with pork jowl bacon and jaew tomato sauce may be the best patty in the city". The website also included Taurus Ox in a 2022 list of "38 Essential Restaurants in Seattle" and 2025 overview of the best restaurants on Capitol Hill. The restaurant is a favorite of Shota Nakajima.
