= Madrona Arms =

Restaurant in Seattle, Washington, U.S.

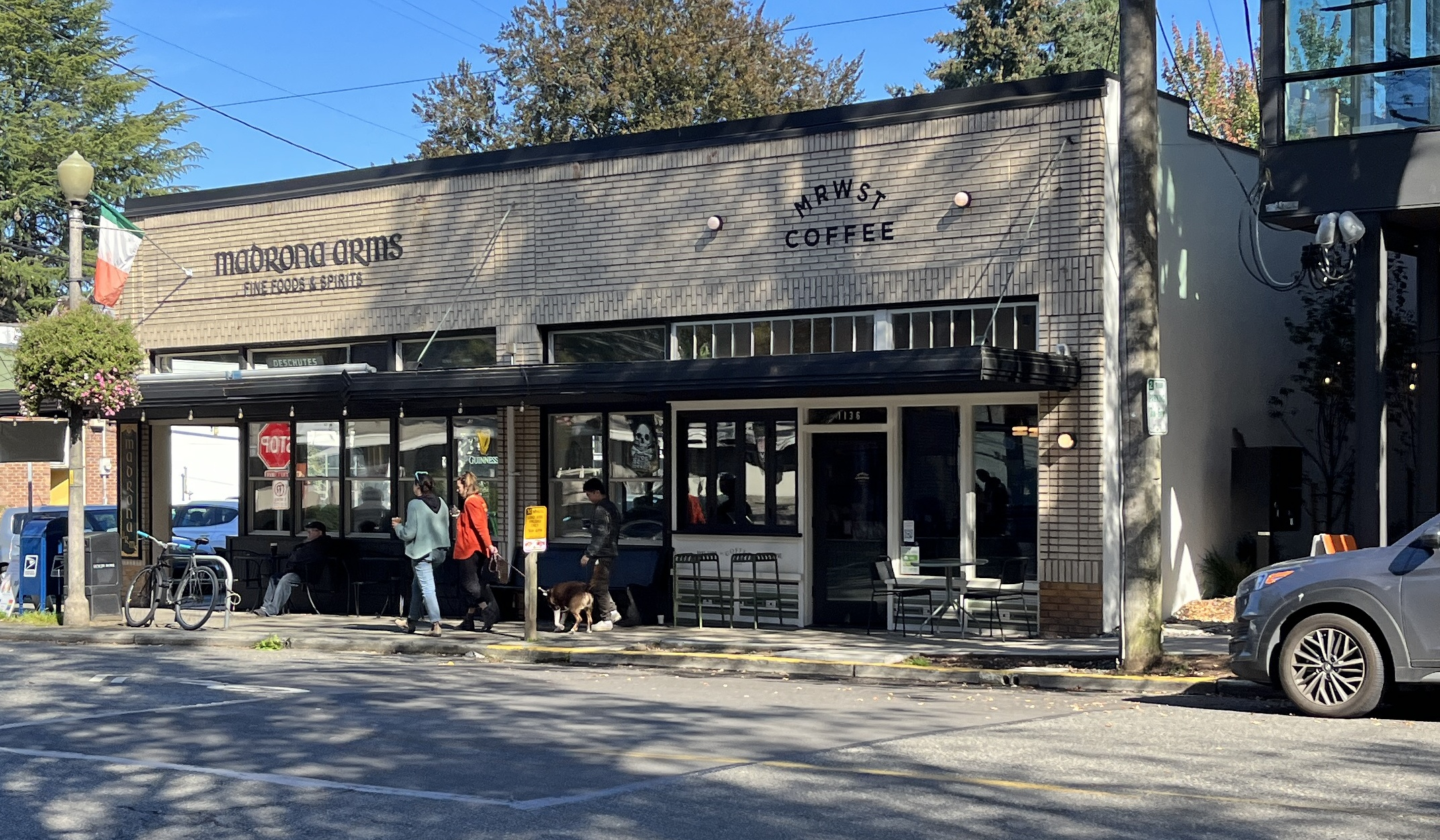
- The restaurant's exterior, 2023
- Interactive map of Madrona Arms

Restaurant information
- Owner: Peter Johnson
- Location: 1138 34th Avenue, Seattle, Washington, 98122, United States
- Coordinates: 47°36′46″N 122°17′21″W
- Website: madronaarms.com

Madrona Arms is a restaurant in Seattle's Madrona neighborhood, in the United States.

== Description and history ==
Peter Johnson opened Madrona Arms in 2015, replacing Madrona Eatery and Ale House. The 2,800-square-foot space, described by Curbed as a "family-friendly pub", accommodates approximately 90 people.

Lonely Planet describes the restaurant as "a newish neighborhood pub in Madrona fashioned in the old British tradition with obvious nods to Seattle (local draft ales). It's run by an Irishman so there's Guinness on tap and some old-country food standards, including bangers and mash, and shepherd's pie." The restaurant also serves corned beef hash and frittatas.

Upon opening, some local residents thought a couple of decorative signs were sexist. The signs were removed immediately. The restaurant hosted an election night party in 2019.

== Reception ==
Bradley Foster included Madrona Arms in Thrillist's 2017 list of Seattle's best Irish pubs, writing, "this fireplace-equipped establishment is a solid everyday hang, thanks to a laid-back atmosphere and a menu featuring Irish nachos (made w/ tater tots), a whiskey crab soup, and classics like shepherd's pie and bangers & mash".
