= The Red Door (restaurant) =

Defunct restaurant in Seattle, Washington, U.S.

- Interactive map of The Red Door

Restaurant information
- Location: 3401 Evanston Ave. N., Seattle, King, Washington, 98103, United States
- Coordinates: 47°39′00″N 122°21′06″W

The Red Door was a restaurant in Seattle, in the U.S. state of Washington. It was featured on the Food Network's Diners, Drive-Ins and Dives. It closed in 2020.

== See also ==
- List of defunct restaurants of the United States
- List of Diners, Drive-Ins and Dives episodes
