= Coffee in Seattle =

Overview of coffee culture and brands in Seattle, Washington

Coffee in Seattle is a central part of the city's economy, culture and identity. Commercial coffee roasting in Seattle dates to the late nineteenth century, while a coffeehouse culture centered on espresso, music and social gathering emerged during the late 1950s and 1960s. The city later became associated with companies including Starbucks, Seattle's Best Coffee and Tully's, as well as numerous independent roasters and coffeehouses. Seattle has also contributed to developments in espresso preparation, coffee equipment and barista culture.

Independent coffeehouses and immigrant communities have also shaped Seattle's coffee culture. The city's coffeehouses have served as gathering places for music, conversation, and community life, while traditions such as the Ethiopian coffee ceremony reflect cultural diversity of Seattle's coffee scene.

== Coffee consumption and culture ==
Coffee has played a role in Seattle's commercial and social life for more than a century. The city's coffee culture developed through local roasting businesses, independent coffeehouses, and the growth of espresso-based drinks. Coffee shops have also become gathering places where residents meet, study, work, and participate in community life.

=== Ethiopian Coffee Culture ===
Seattle's coffee culture also reflects the traditions of its immigrant communities. Seattle's Ethiopian community grew substantially beginning in the 1970s and 1980s, and Ethiopian coffee traditions remain part of the city's coffee culture. The traditional Ethiopian coffee ceremony emphasizes social interaction and community as well as the preparation and consumption of coffee. The ceremony can involve roasting the beans, brewing and serving multiple rounds of coffee while participants converse and share stories.

Ethiopian owned establishments in Seattle have continued elements of these traditions. Kaffa Coffee and Wine Bar, for example, was named for the Kaffa region of southwestern Ethiopia and has served coffee using beans roasted by local Seattle roasters. For members of Seattle's Ethiopian community, the coffee ceremony can function as both a social gathering and a means of maintaining cultural identity and shared history.

=== Workers and Labor ===
Working conditions and labor organizations have also been a part of Seattle's coffee industry. Seattle's Secure Scheduling Ordinance, which took effect in 2017, covers hourly employees at qualifying retail and food service businesses with at least 500 employees worldwide. The ordinance requires covered employers to provide work schedules at least 14 days in advance and establishes compensation requirements for certain schedule changes.

A 2022 study of the ordinance examined scheduling practices through surveys and interviews with retail and food service managers, including managers of coffee shops. The report discussed challenges involving employee turnover, staffing, and providing predictable work schedules.

Labor organizing has also involved Seattle Starbucks employees. In April 2025, employees at a Starbucks location in Seattle voted 12 to 8 in favor of representation by Workers United, according to the National Labor Relations Board.

== History ==
=== Early coffee roasting ===
Seattle's commercial coffee industry dates to the late nineteenth century. Before commercial roasting became common, Seattle residents generally roasted coffee at home, while commercially roasted beans were often shipped north from San Francisco. Because roasted coffee could become stale during shipping, local grocery, and mercantile businesses began roasting coffee themselves. In 1887, Dan Davies opened D. Davies & Co., which HistoryLink identifies as the first known coffee roasting business in Seattle. In the late 1890s, Schwabacher Brothers & Company began selling its Gold Shield coffee, regarded as Seattle's first widely distributed local coffee brand.

In 1908, brothers Edward and William Manning opened Manning's Coffee at Pike Place Market, where the company roasted, blended, and sold its own coffee. Manning's expanded into a regional chain, and by the 1930s, operated more than 60 locations on the West Coast, including ten in Seattle. It became the first local chain of coffee shops to serve its own brand of freshly roasted coffee.

=== Rise of coffeehouses ===
Seattle's modern coffeehouse culture began developing in the late 1950s alongside the city's beatnik scene. These establishments differed from conventional coffee shops by combining coffee with art, live music and spaces for conversation and exchanging ideas. Café Encore, which opened in the University District in 1958 and is identified as Seattle's first coffeehouse. The Door opened downtown the following year and became the first Seattle coffeehouse to prepare drinks using a traditional espresso machine.

Coffeehouses became increasingly popular during the 1960s, particularly in the University District, which became an important center of Seattle's counterculture. The 1962 Seattle World's Fair included the Sleeping Buddha coffeehouse, which combined espresso, folk music and art. Seattle coffeehouses are organized politically through the Seattle Coffee House Association in response to city regulations that classified establishments featuring live music as cabarets.

=== Starbucks and the espresso boom ===
Seattle's coffee industry expanded further during the 1970s and 1980s. Starbucks opened near Pike Place in 1971 after its founders learned coffee roasting and the coffee business from Alfred Peets. Initially, Starbucks sold roasted beans rather than brewed coffee. The company later established its own roasting facility, and in 1976 moved into Pike Place Market.

Seattle also became an important center for espresso technology. Kent Bakke became the first U.S. distributor of Italian La Marzocco espresso machines in 1978 and subsequently established the Seattle based Visions Espresso. Starbucks began selling brewed coffee in 1982 and opened its first espresso bar in 1984. Howard Schultz purchased Starbucks in 1987. The following year, former Boeing engineer David Schomer founded Espresso Vivace and applied a technical approach to espresso preparation and barista training.

=== Specialty Coffee Movement ===
During the late twentieth and early twenty-first centuries, Seattle became associated with the specialty coffee movement, which emphasized coffee quality, bean origins, roasting techniques, and brewing methods. Independent roasters and coffeehouses helped expand local interest in coffees from specific growing regions and in methods such as pour-over and French press brewing. Seattle businesses including Caffè Vita, Victrola Coffee Roasters, and Zoka became apart of this development, while Espresso Vivace contributed to the city's reputation for espresso preparation. The movement also encouraged greater attention to relationships between coffee roasters and producers, including direct sourcing from coffee growing regions.

== Roasters ==
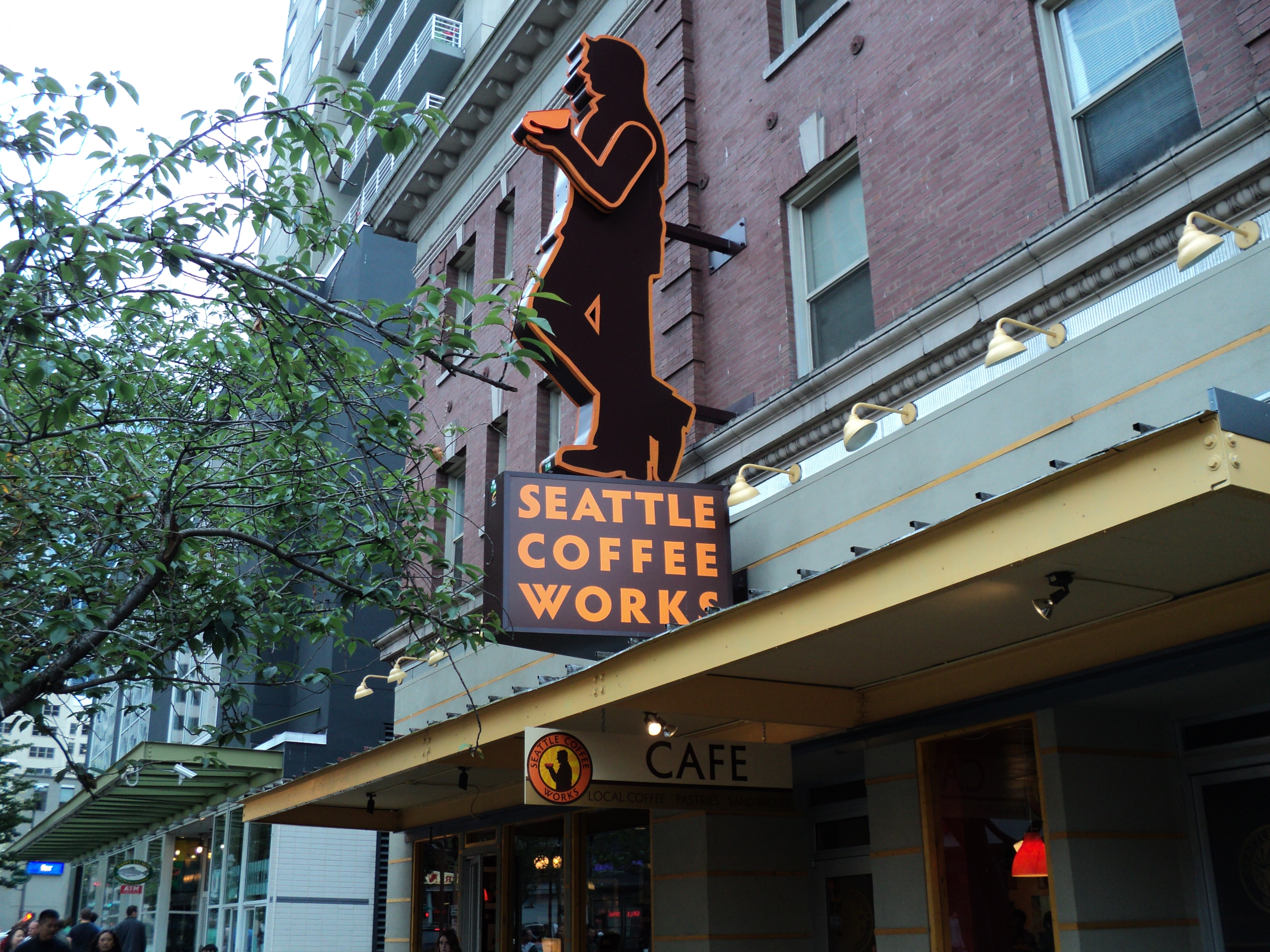
Seattle Coffee Works

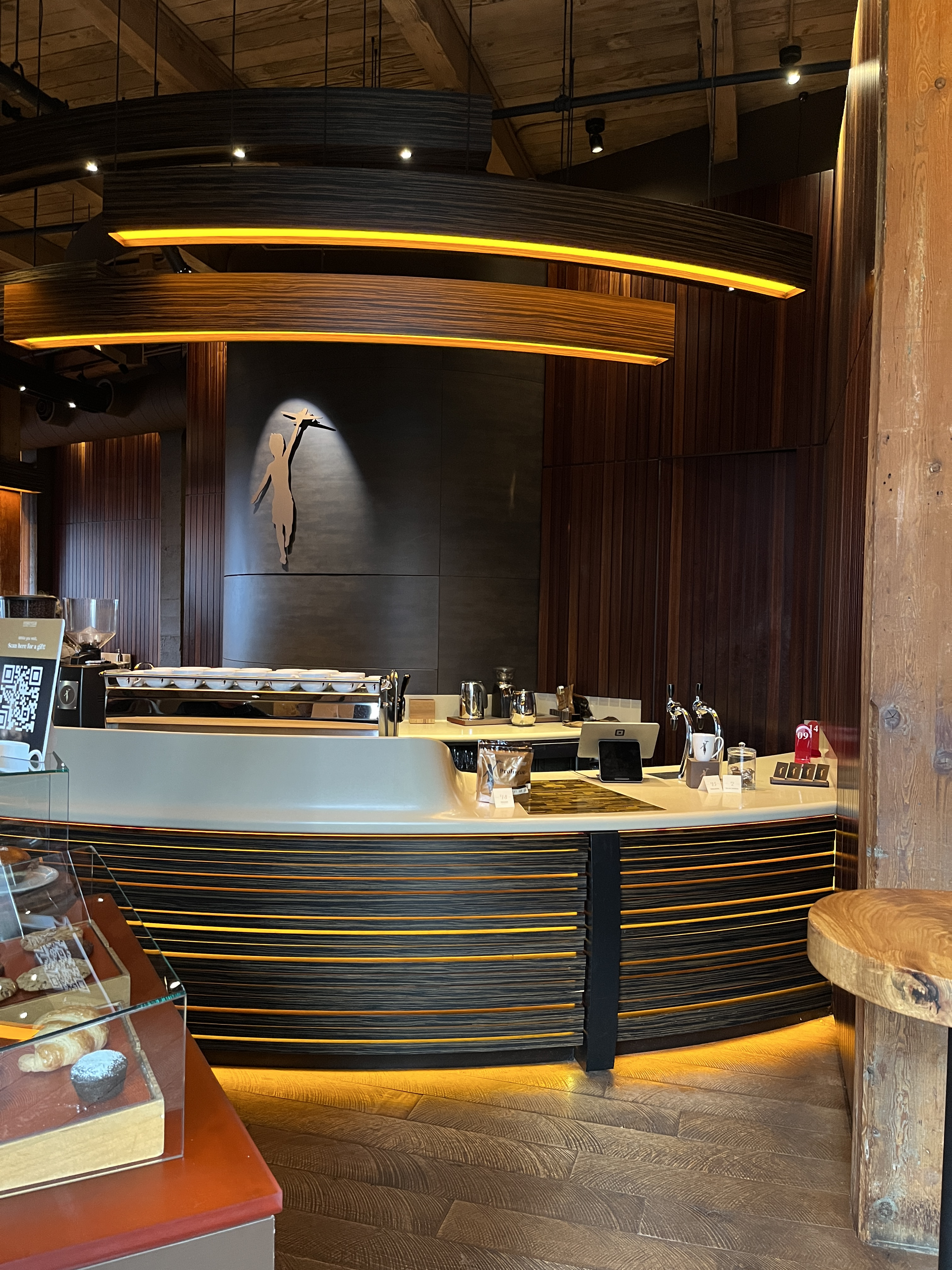
Storyville Coffee at Pike Place Market

Seattle's coffee industry includes both large national companies and smaller independent roasters. Local roasting businesses contribute to the city's coffee culture by offering different roasting styles, sourcing practices, and blends. Many also operate their own cafés, allowing customers to experience their products directly. Together, these businesses demonstrate the variety within Seattle's coffee industry and the continued presence of independent coffee companies alongside larger chains.

Seattle Coffee Roasters:

- QED Coffee
- Anchorhead Coffee
- Conduit Coffee Roasters
- Fulcrum Coffee
- River Trail Roasters
- Caffè Umbria
- Torrefazione Italia
- Fremont Coffee Company
- Herkimer Coffee
- Kuma Coffee
- Caffe Appassionato
- Caffe Ladro
- Lighthouse Roaster
- Zoka Coffee Roaster and Tea Company

Storyville Coffee also operates within the Seattle metropolitan area.

=== Starbucks ===
Starbucks is one of the best known coffee companies and has played a major role in the city's association with coffee culture. In addition to its retail operations, the company has influenced the local coffee industry through its expansion and acquisitions, including its 2003 purchase of Seattle's Best Coffee, which originated as Stewart Brothers Coffee.

=== Tully's Coffee ===
Tully's Coffee was at one time Seattle's second-largest coffee retailer. As of March 2018 there no longer are any Tully’s retail locations in the United States. Tom Tully O'Keefe founded the chain in Kent, Washington in 1992 to rival the expansion of Starbucks with an alternative business model.

=== Caffe Vita Coffee Roasting Company ===
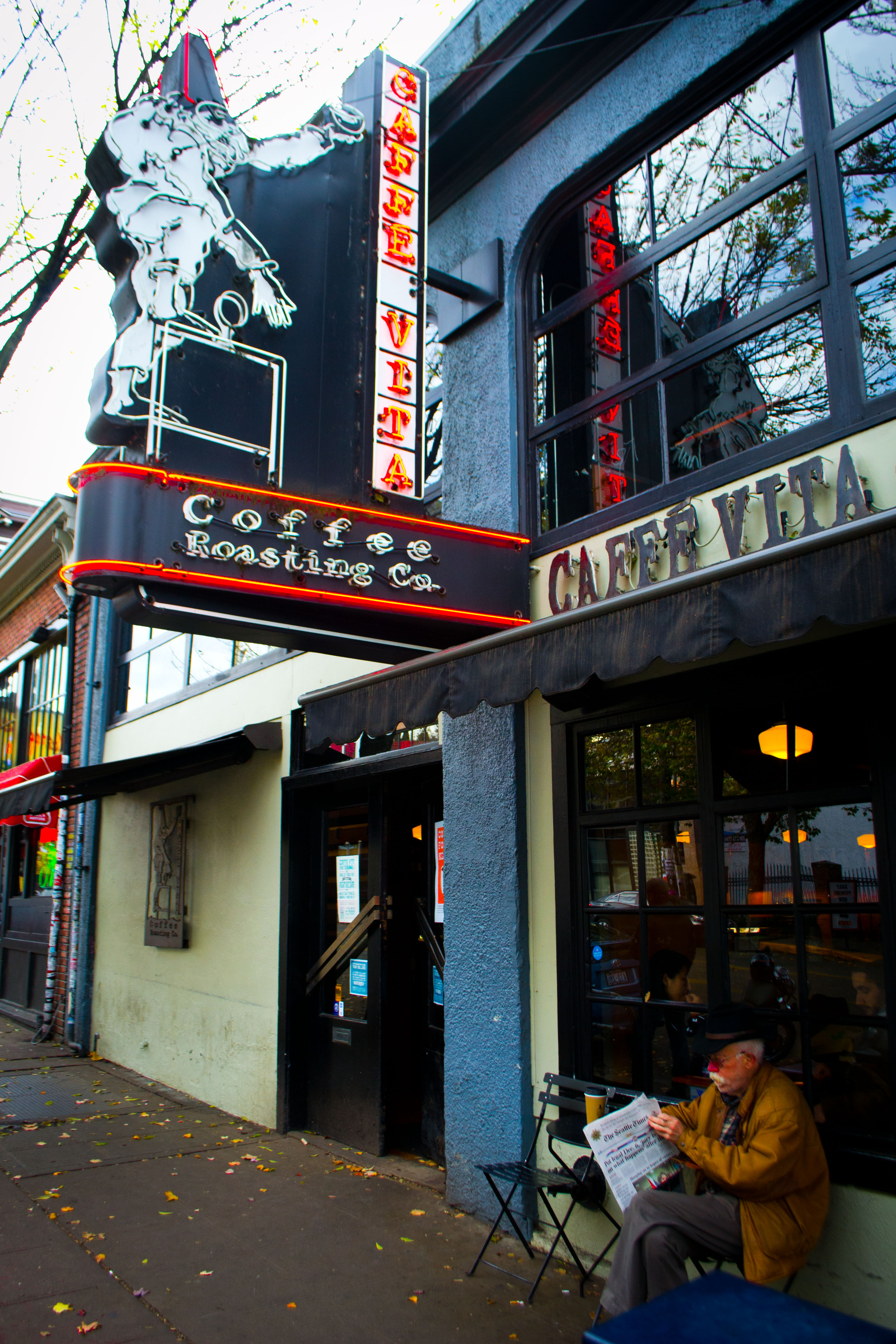
Caffe Vita Coffee Roasting Company

Caffe Vita Coffee Roasting Company was founded in 1995 to produce specialty artisan coffee and to implement an ethical model for coffee production which bypassed the fair trade business model and sourced coffee beans directly from the farmers producing it.

=== Espresso Vivace ===
Espresso Vivace is a set of coffeehouses and a roaster. Founded in 1988 by a Boeing engineer, the coffee is produced to exacting specifications to match the owner's taste and the taste of patrons who prefer this different blend.

=== Stumptown ===
Portland-based Stumptown Coffee Roasters opened a roasting facility in Seattle in 2010. On October 6, 2015, it was announced that San Francisco-based Peet's Coffee (a division of JAB Holding Company of Germany, since 2012) would acquire Stumptown.

== Coffeehouses ==
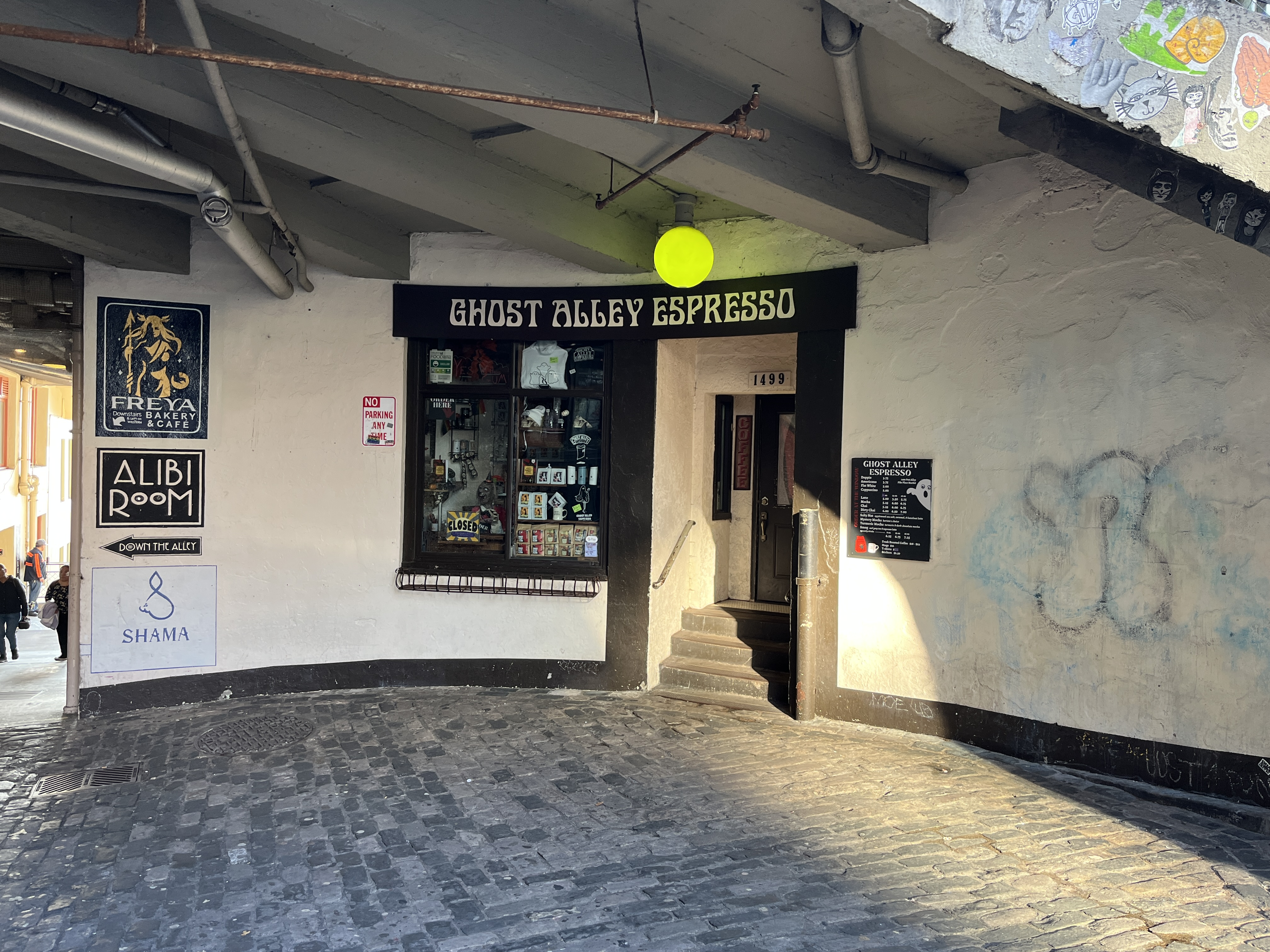
Ghost Alley Espresso

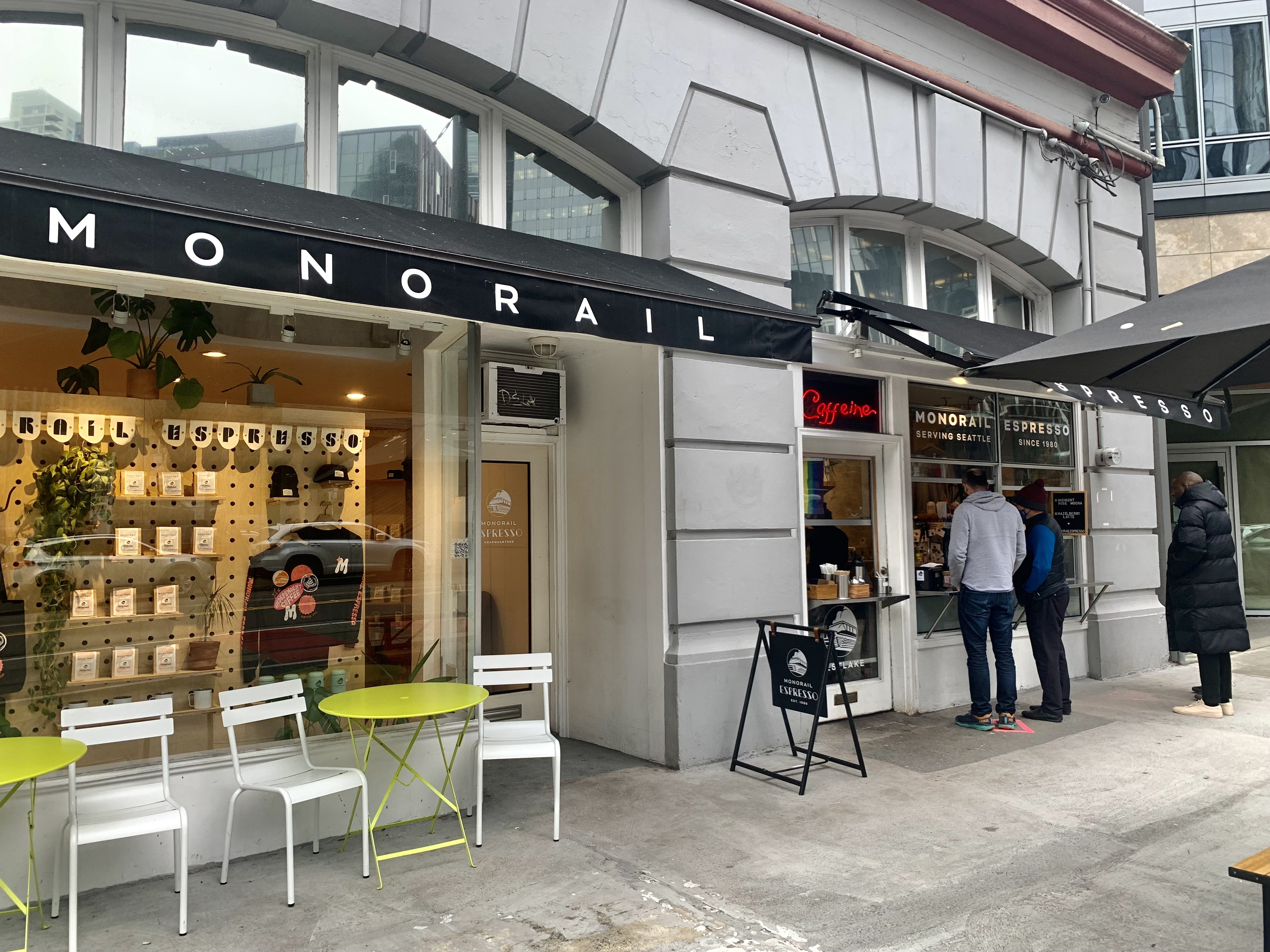
Monorail Espresso

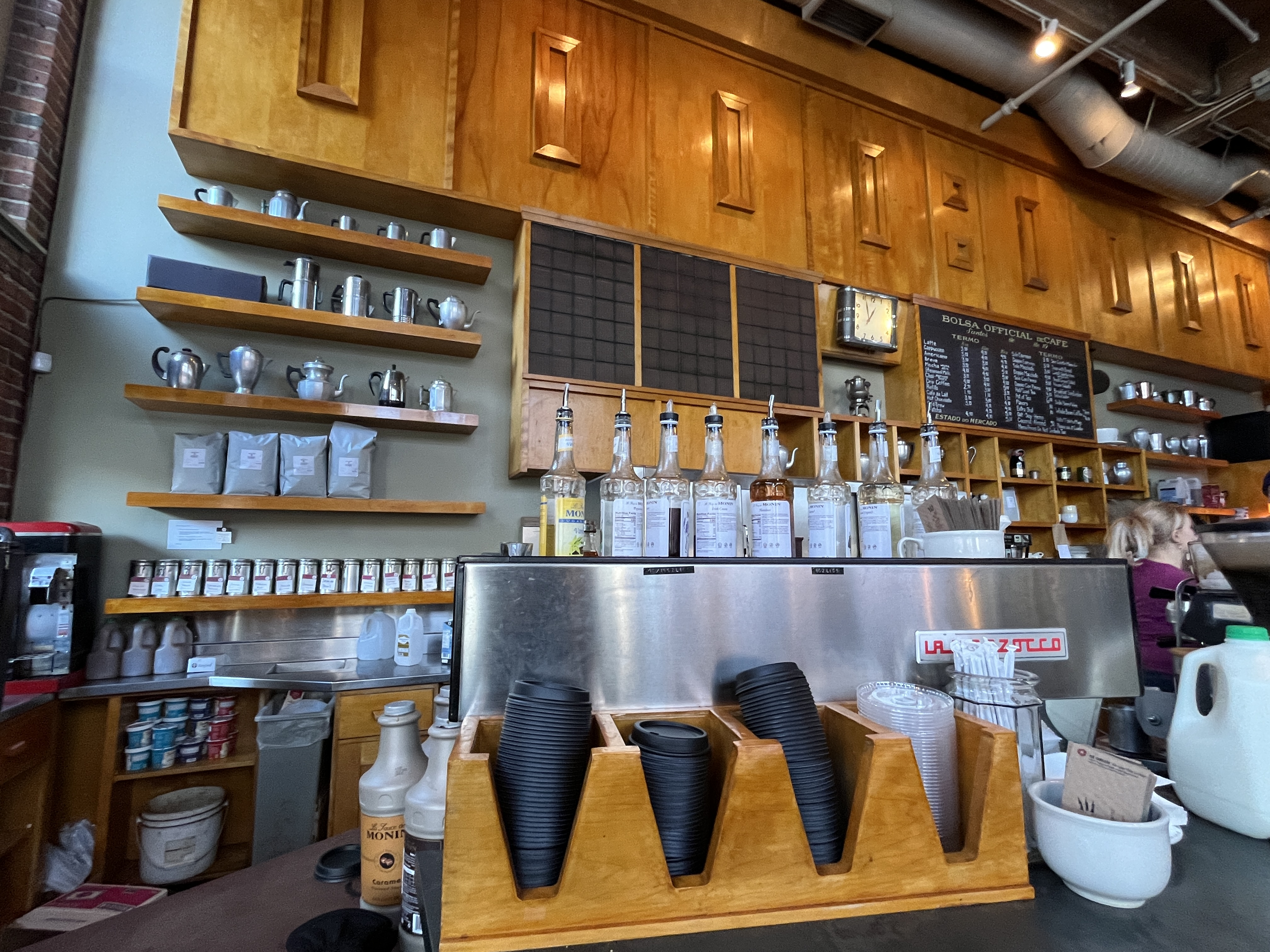
Zeitgeist Coffee

Independent coffeehouses have played an important role in Seattle's social and cultural life. In addition to serving coffee, these establishments have provided spaces for conversation, music, art, and community gatherings. Beginning in the late 1950s, coffeehouses became connected to Seattle's beatnik and counterculture scenes. Over time, coffee shops also delivered into everyday gathering places for students, artists, workers, and neighborhood residents.

- Analog Coffee
- Artly Coffee
- Black Coffee Northwest
- Boon Boona Coffee
- C & P Coffee Company
- Café Allegro
- Café Hagen
- Caffe Vita
- Cherry Street Coffee House
- Drinkmore Cafe
- Eastern Cafe
- Espresso Vivace
- Fuel Coffee & Books
- Ghost Alley Espresso
- Ghost Note Coffee
- Hello Em
- Kaladi Brothers Coffee
- Kitanda
- Leon Coffee House
- Monorail Espresso
- Moore Coffee
- Mr. West Cafe Bar
- Overcast Coffee Company
- Pegasus Coffee Company
- Phin
- Push x Pull
- Top Pot Doughnuts
- Elm Coffee Roasters
- QED Coffee
- Uptown Espresso
- URL Coffee
- Wunderground Coffee
- Zeitgeist Coffee

=== Café Allegro ===
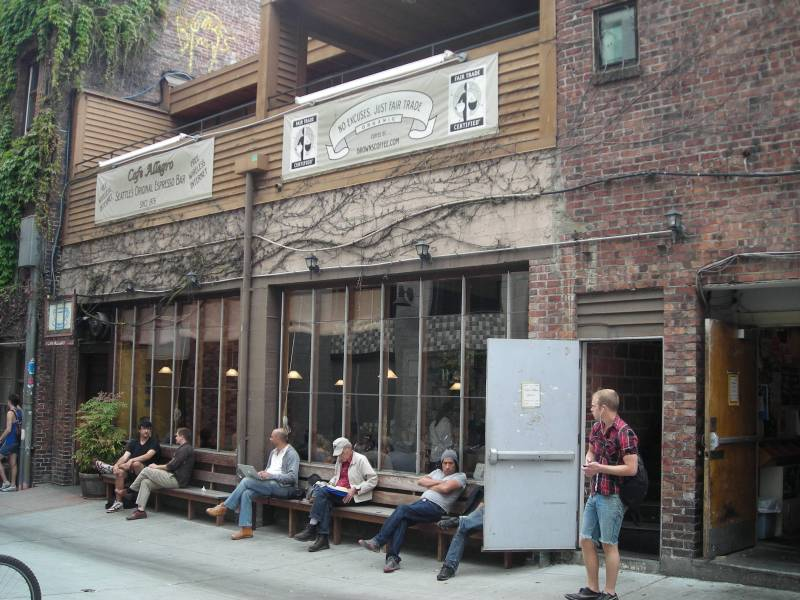
Café Allegro

Café Allegro is a coffeeshop in University District. Its founder worked with Starbucks roasters to develop the original Starbucks espresso roast, which is darker than most other roasts but still lighter than the darkest roast. That espresso roast remains the standard Starbucks espresso offering, but it was developed for Café Allegro.

=== Last Exit on Brooklyn ===
The Last Exit on Brooklyn was a coffee house which opened in 1967 and closed in 2000. It was a gathering place for high-level chess players and intellectuals, and the proprietor worked to "create a haven where students and the benign crazies" were welcome and where "everyone felt equal and there were no sacred cows".

== Coffee events ==
Coffee: World in your Cup is the name of an exhibition and community series which premiered in Seattle through most of 2009 at the Burke Museum. The exhibition includes displays of equipment at the museum and a lecture series with talks in various locations wherein experts talk about aspects of the coffee industry.

The World Barista Championship was held in Seattle in April 2015. The competition, and its winner Sasa Sestic, were the subject of a documentary film The Coffee Man.

== Seattle coffee in popular culture ==
In the NBC series Frasier, the characters are often seen drinking coffee at the fictional Café Nervosa, which is said to have been inspired by the real-life Elliott Bay Book Company.

== See also ==
- Coffee in Portland, Oregon
