= QED Coffee =

Coffee roasting company in Seattle, Washington

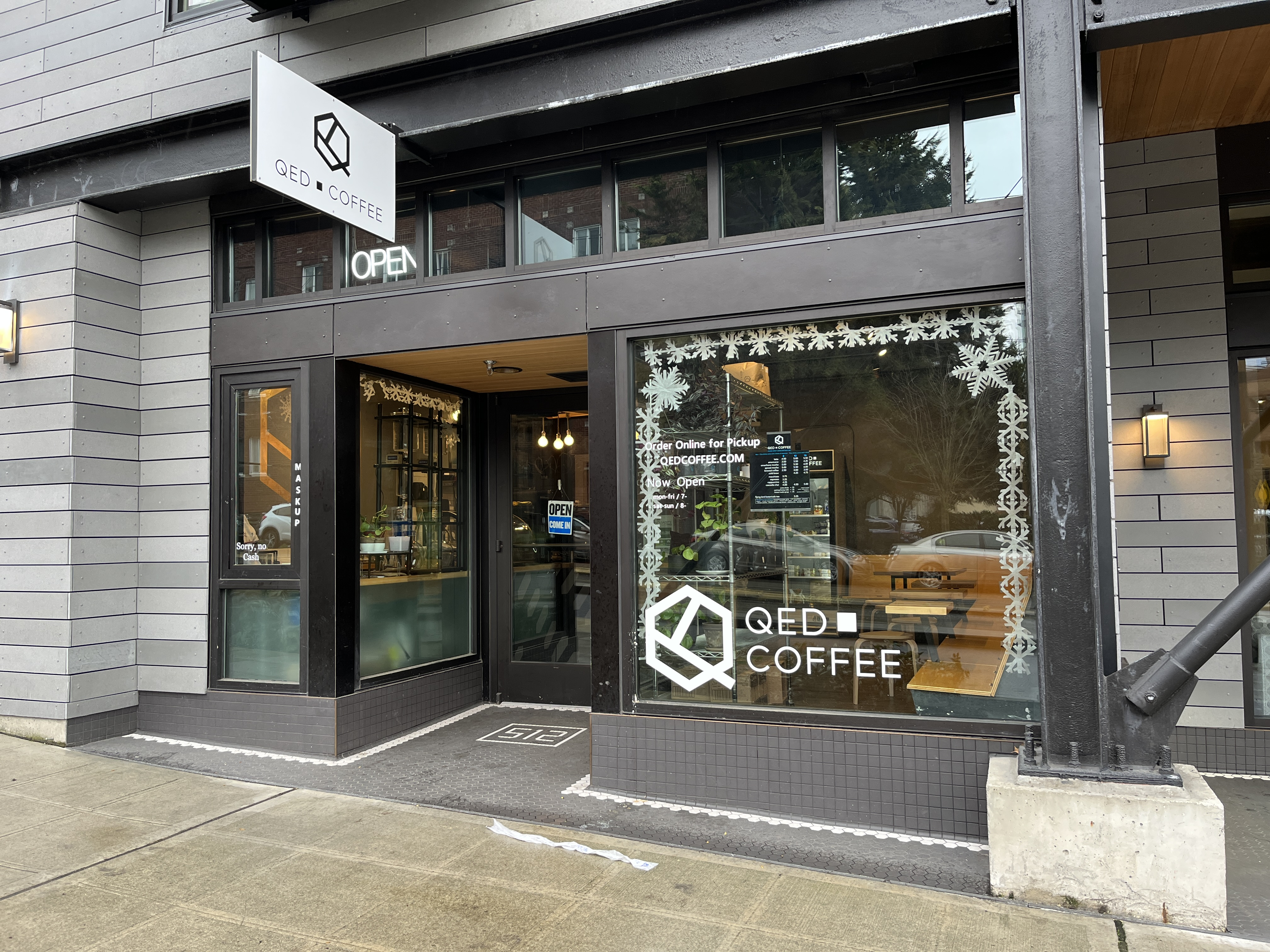
- Exterior of a QED Coffee shop in Seattle in February 2023
- Type: Private
- Industry: Restaurants
- Founded: 2014
- Headquarters: Seattle, Washington, U.S.
- Key people: Matt Greenfield
- Products: Coffee
- Website: www.qedcoffee.com

QED Coffee is a small-batch specialty coffee roaster based in Seattle, Washington.

== Description ==
QED Coffee is a coffee roast based in Seattle, Washington. The business name is derived from the Latin Q.E.D., an initialism of the phrase quod erat demonstrandum, meaning "that which was to be demonstrated."

In addition to coffee, QED serves sparkling wine and baked goods such as banana bread.

== History ==
Founded in 2014 by owner Matt Greenfield, the business began with Greenfield roasting coffee wholesale in his garage in West Seattle. In 2015, he opened the first QED shop in the Mount Baker neighborhood.

QED participated in a fundraiser benefitting the American Civil Liberties Union in 2017. The business also opened a shop near Seattle Center.

In 2023, QED Coffee opened a second location in West Seattle.

== Reception ==
The Seattle Metropolitan has called QED's microroasts "impeccable".

== See also ==
- Coffee in Seattle
