= Elm Coffee Roasters =

Coffee shop in Seattle, Washington, U.S.

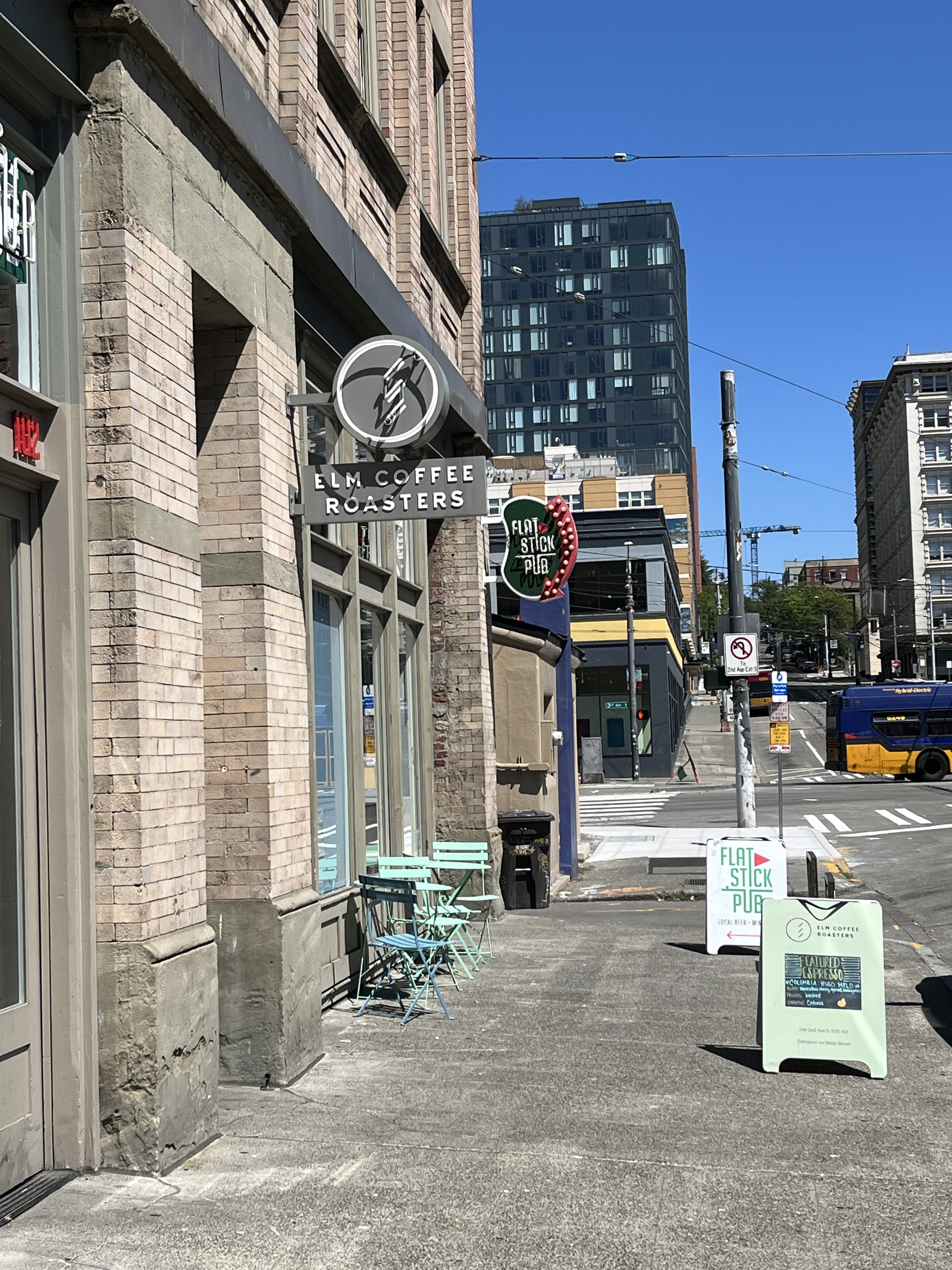
- The shop's exterior, 2024
- Interactive map of Elm Coffee Roasters

Restaurant information
- Location: Seattle, King, Washington, United States
- Coordinates: 47.6001°N 122.3311°W
- Website: elmcoffeeroasters.com

Elm Coffee Roasters is a coffee shop in Seattle's Pioneer Square, in the U.S. state of Washington. It has operated two locations.

== Description ==
Elm Coffee Roasters is a coffee shop on Main Street in Pioneer Square, Seattle. The 1,400-square-foot space is housed in the Pacific Commercial Building. Elm has a marble bar, high industrial ceilings, and blue tables outside. It focuses on light roasts. The One of Everything includes an espresso, a macchiato, and a brewed coffee. Chai and hazelnut milk are made in-house. Elm has served doughnuts from General Porpoise and other pastries.

== History ==
The shop opened in December 2014. Brendan Mullally and Drew Fitchette are co-owners.

== Reception ==
In 2020, the Daily Hive included Elm in a 2020 list of Seattle's twelve best coffee shops, and Naomi Tomky included the business in Thrillist's overview of the city's best craft coffee shops. In Eater Seattle's 2024 list of the city's fourteen "essential" coffee shops, Mark Van Streefkerk and Harry Cheadle called Elm "a perfect place for stellar coffee, geeky yet approachable in a way that invites you to learn more about the finer points of brewing as well as harvesting and processing." In 2024, Sophia Beam included the business in Tasting Table's 2024 list of the seventeen "absolute best" iced coffees in Seattle, and Sydney Baker included Elm in a Fodor's list of the city's ten best cafes other than Starbucks.
