= Analog Coffee =

Coffee shop in Seattle, Washington, U.S.

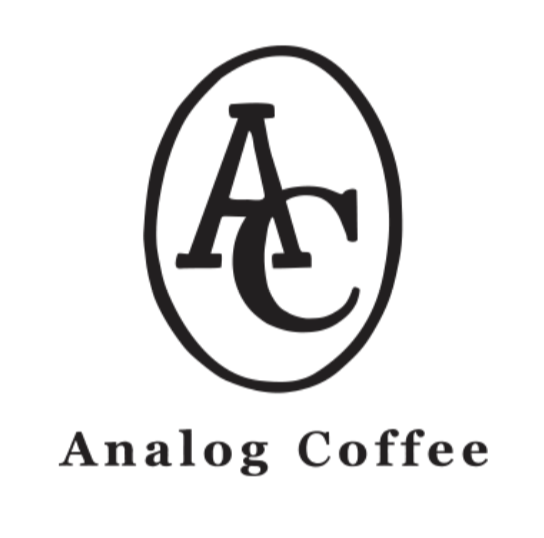

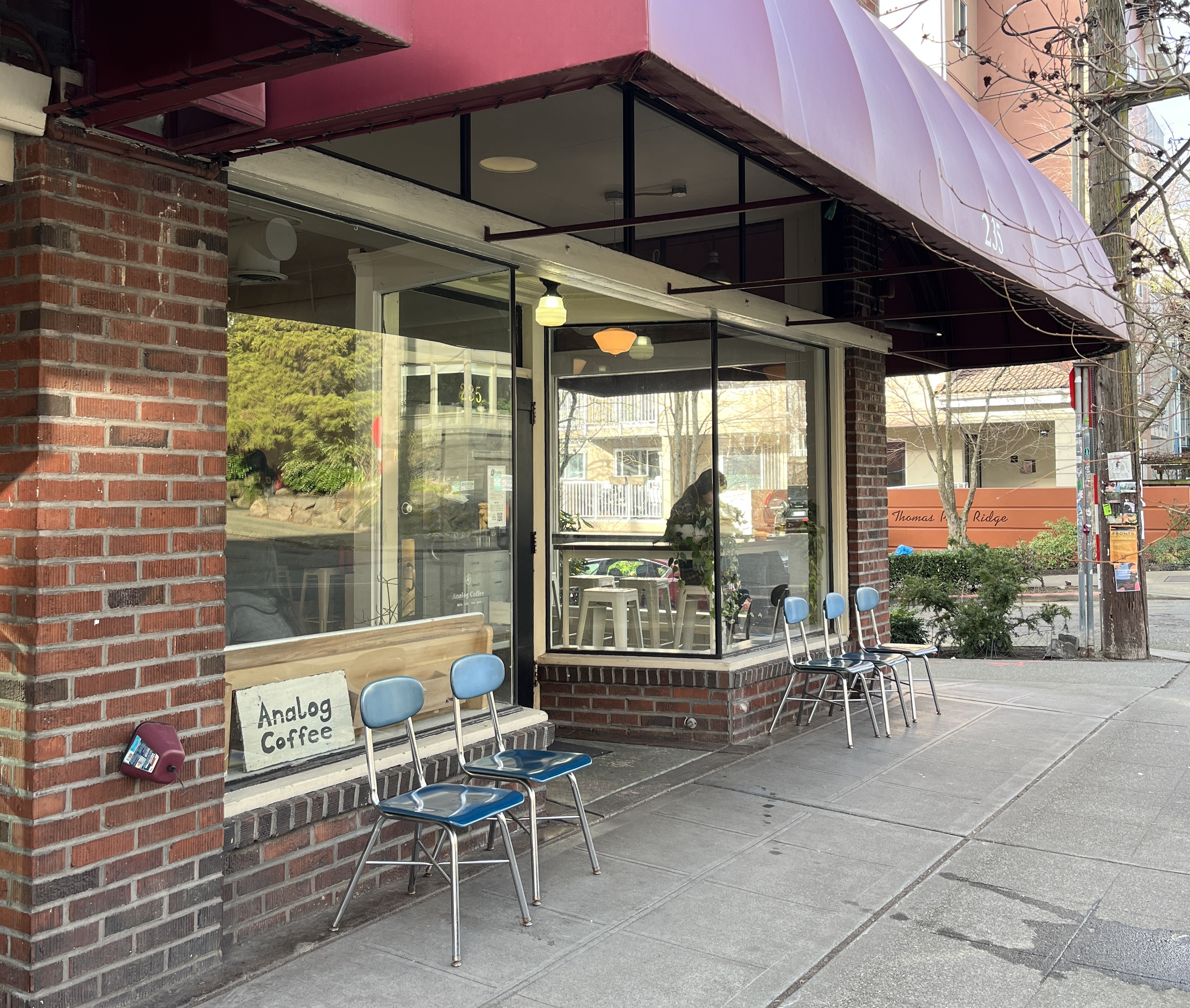
- The shop's exterior in 2023
- Interactive map of Analog Coffee

Restaurant information
- Owners: Danny Hanlon; Tim Hayden
- Location: 235 Summit Avenue East, Seattle, King, Washington, 98102, United States
- Coordinates: 47.6207°N 122.3255°W
- Website: analogcoffee.com

Analog Coffee is a coffee shop on Seattle's Capitol Hill, in the U.S. state of Washington. The business is co-owned by Danny Hanlon and Tim Hayden.

== Description ==
The third-wave coffee shop Analog Coffee operates on Summit Avenue on Seattle's Capitol Hill. Gulf Business has described Analog as a "laid-back shop beloved by locals for its back-to-basics ethos". Fodor's has called the shop "hipster" and "picture-perfect", and the Not for Tourists Guide to Seattle has described Analog as a "sweet little neighborhood coffee joint". There are comics, magazines, and journals available inside, as well as a record collection incorporating various music genres.

The menu includes coffee and espresso drinks, including americanos, cold brews, and an espresso and tonic. Analog Coffee is associated with the cafe B-Side; orders are placed at Analog and food is picked up at B-Side's window.

== History ==
Analog Coffee is co-owned by Danny Hanlon and Tim Hayden. Alton Brown visited the shop in 2015. After the arrival of the COVID-19 pandemic, Analog did not fully re-open until early 2023.

== Reception ==
In 2017, food writer Bethany Jean Clement of The Seattle Times said Analog "makes some of Seattle's very best coffee, using beans from 'a rotating cast of exceptional local roasters,' organic dairy from Fresh Breeze, and exacting care." She also said of the clientele: "regulars include a lot of restaurant industry people, in varying states of bleariness". Rich Smith of The Stranger described the shop as "a nice place to drink coffee, read sweet comics, and run into your exes".

In Condé Nast Traveler's 2018 list of Seattle's ten best coffee shops, Hannah Kirshner called Analog "hip and perfect, photogenic and famous". Eater Seattle called Analog one of Capitol Hill's "coolest" coffee shops in 2020, and Time Out Seattle included the business in an overview of the city's best coffee in 2021. In Tasting Table's 2024 list of Seattle's seventeen "absolute best" iced coffees, Sophia Beams called the espresso and tonic "unique".
