= Moore Coffee =

Chain of coffee shops in the U.S. state of Washington

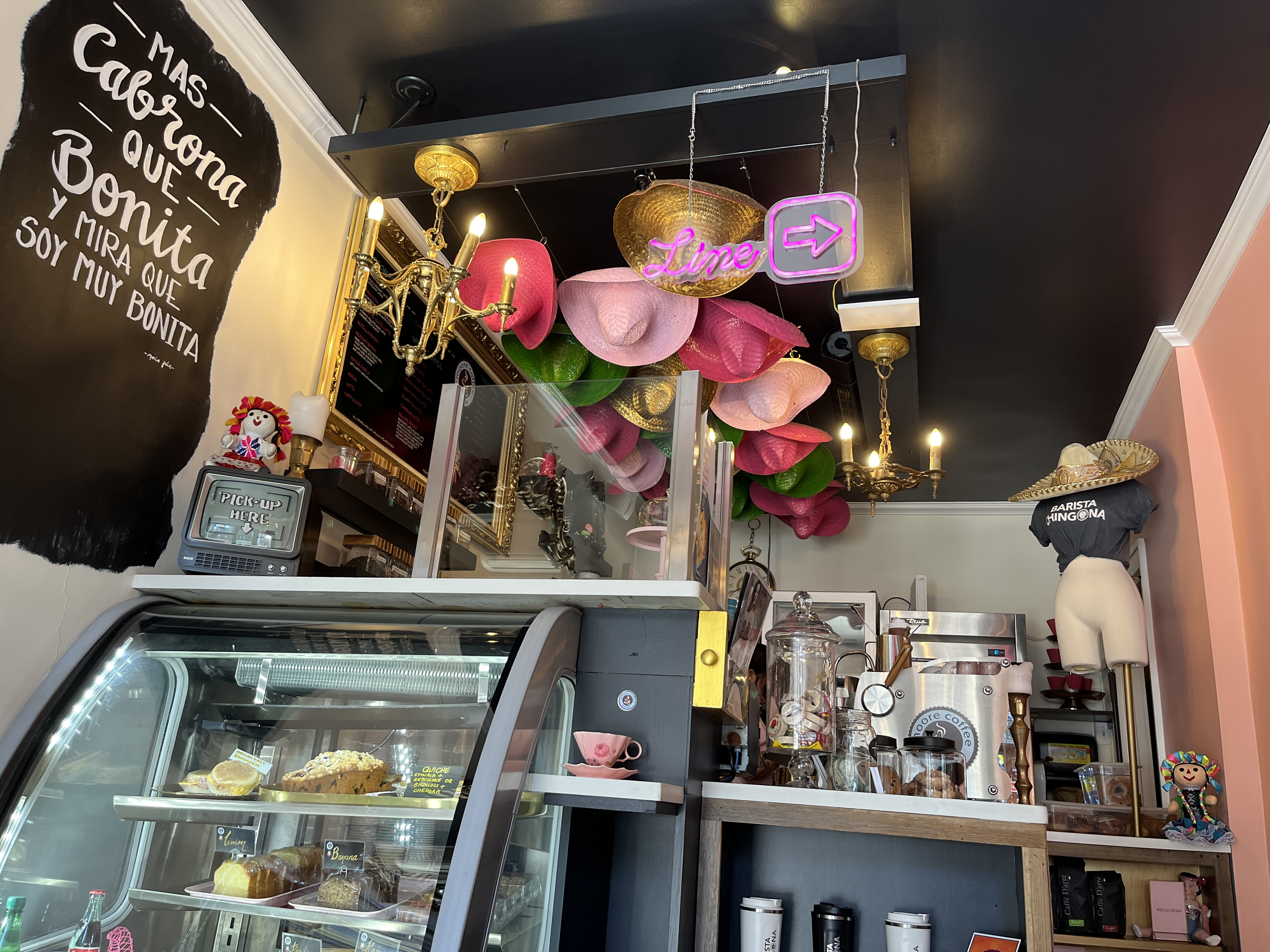
- Interior of the original shop on 2nd Avenue in Seattle in 2024

Restaurant information
- Established: 2011
- Owner: Lupe Chavez
- Location: Washington, United States

Moore Coffee is a small chain of coffee shops based in Seattle, in the U.S. state of Washington. The Latino-owned business was established by Lupe Chavez in 2011. There are two shops in Seattle and a third in Burien.

== Description ==
Moore Coffee is a small chain of coffee shops in Seattle; the original operates in the building that houses the Moore Theatre and hotel at the intersection of 2nd and Virginia. The Stranger has said the Latino-owned shop has a "colorful Mexico City-style decor".

=== Menu ===
Among coffee drinks is a crema de leche latte with cajeta (caramelized and sweetened goat milk), a Nutella mocha, a Mocha Diablo (with chili); other latte varieties include horchata, matcha, Pumpkin Spice, taro, and turmeric. The Cafe Madrid is made with condensed milk. According to Eater Seattle, lattes have "intricate cartoon-like animal latte art, making for some distinctly adorable-looking beverages".

Moore Coffee also serves food. The menu includes breads, muffins, tamales, and waffles.

== History ==
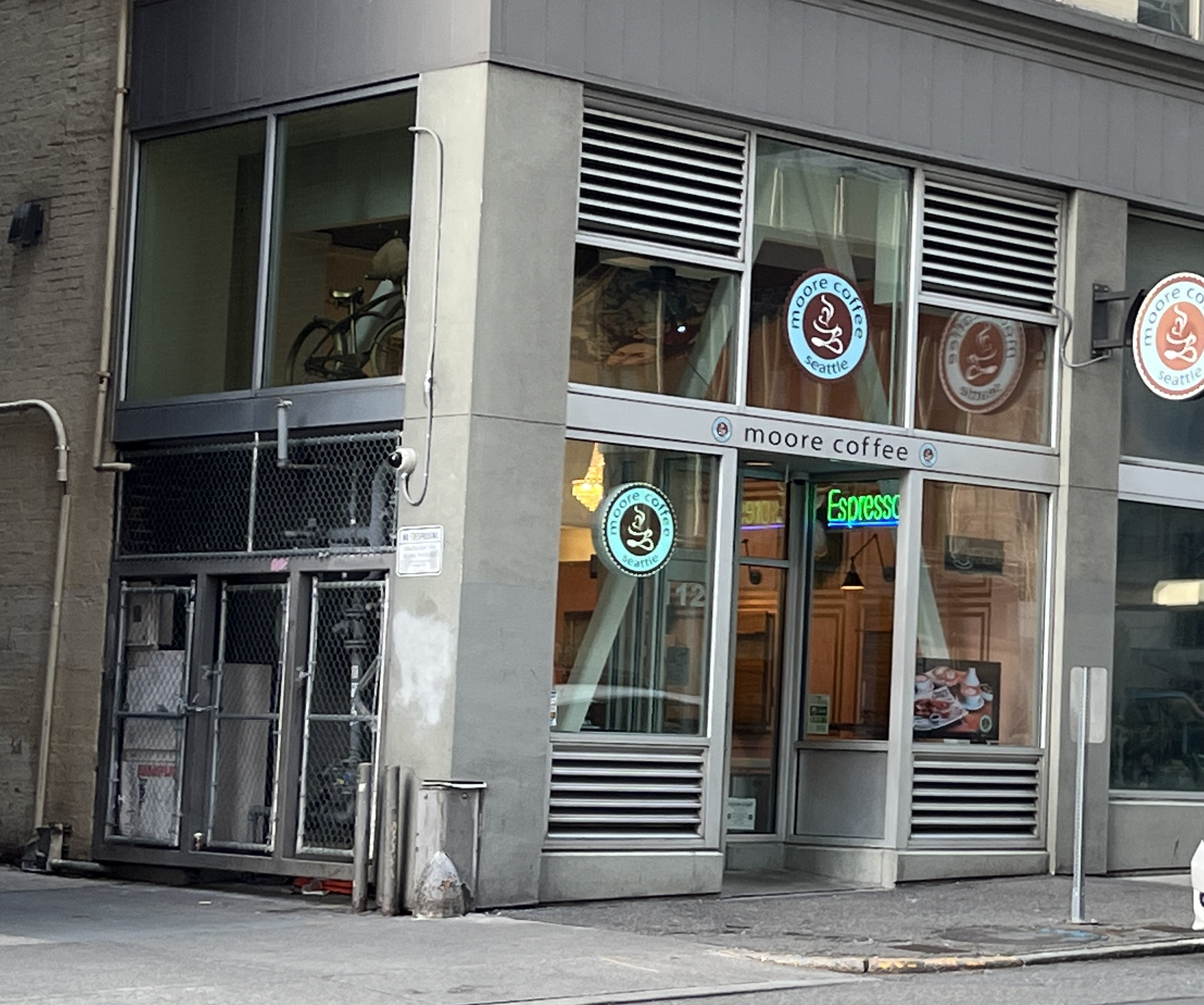
Exterior of the shop of Stewart Street, Seattle (2023)

Lupe Chavez opened Moore Coffee in 2011, as an homage to a former coffee shop in the Moore Theatre building. The shop underwent a resdesign in 2021.

A third location opened in Burien, Washington.

== Reception ==
The Not for Tourists Guide to Seattle says, "Nutella latte. Need I say Moore?" In 2019, Eater Seattle's Gabe Guarente said, "Instagrammable lattes and large breakfast sandwiches are the draw at this cozy spot... The line can get packed right before the workday, so best to scout it out beforehand."

== See also ==
- List of coffeehouse chains
- List of restaurant chains in the United States
