= Caffe Ladro =

Coffee shop chain in the U.S. state of Washington

- Logo

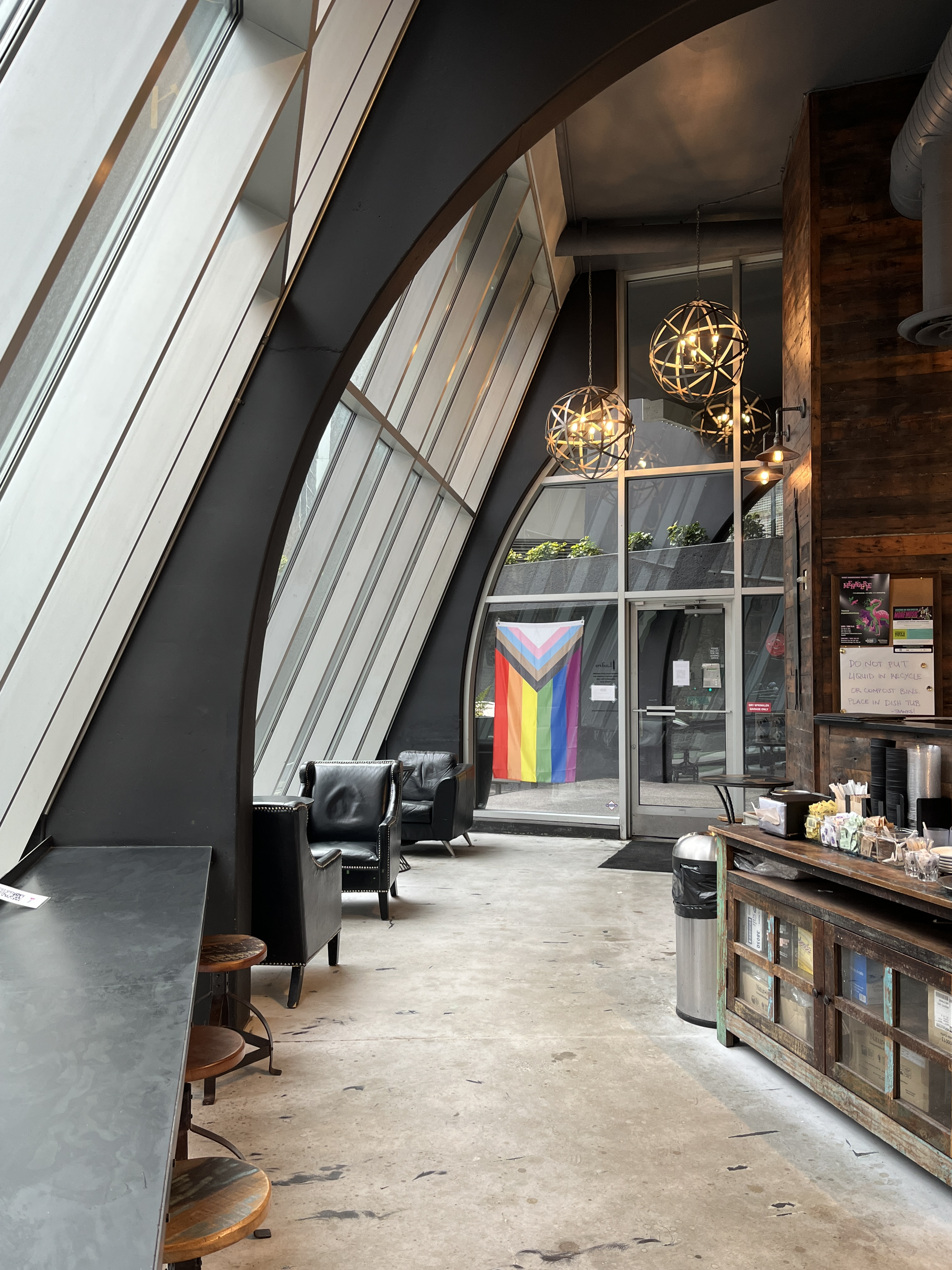
- Interior of the coffee shop at 801 Pine Street in downtown Seattle
- Founded: 1994; 32 years ago
- Founders: Jack Kelly and Bob Ohly
- Headquarters: Seattle, Washington, United States
- Website: caffeladro.com

Caffe Ladro is a coffee shop chain and roastery in the Seattle metropolitan area, in the U.S. state of Washington. Established in Seattle's Queen Anne neighborhood in 1994, the business operated fifteen locations as of 2017.

== Description ==
Caffe Ladro (Italian for "coffee thief") is a Seattle-based coffee shop chain and roastery. The business roasts its own coffee beans and bakes its own pastries at a central bakery. The menu has included "light meals" and vegetarian options. According to Moon Seattle (2019), the business is "known for high-quality coffee and consistent service". The Not for Tourists Guide to Seattle has said Caffe Ladro serves "strong coffee for the strong coffee drinker".

== History ==
Caffe Ladro was founded by Jack Kelly and Bob Ohly in 1994. In 2002 it became "the first multiple-unit chain in the country to sell 100 percent fair trade coffee". There were 16 locations as of 2022, and 18 locations as of 2023. In addition to Seattle, the business has operated in Kirkland.

Rachael Ray visited Caffe Ladro for a season 1 (2002) episode of $40 a Day.

In 2020, during the COVID-19 pandemic, the business released a special blend to support the Restaurant Workers' Community Foundation COVID-19 Emergency Relief Fund.

== Reception ==
Caffe Ladro won in the Best Independent Coffee Shop category of Seattle Magazine's readers' choice poll in 2017. Callie Craighead included the business in Seattle Post-Intelligencer's 2021 overview of Seattle's best coffee shops and wrote, "Caffe Ladro is one of Seattle's bigger local chains that still manages to hit the nail on the head for quality drinks." Caffe Ladro was a finalist in the Bellevue Reporter's Bell of Bellevue list in 2021. Allecia Vermillion included the business in Seattle Metropolitan's 2022 overview of a dozen "destination" coffee shops. Mia Salas included Caffe Ladro in Eat This, Not That's 2023 list of "9 Coffee Shop Chains with the Best Quality Coffee in America".

== See also ==
- List of coffeehouse chains
- List of restaurant chains in the United States
