= C & P Coffee Company =

Coffee shop in West Seattle, Washington, U.S.

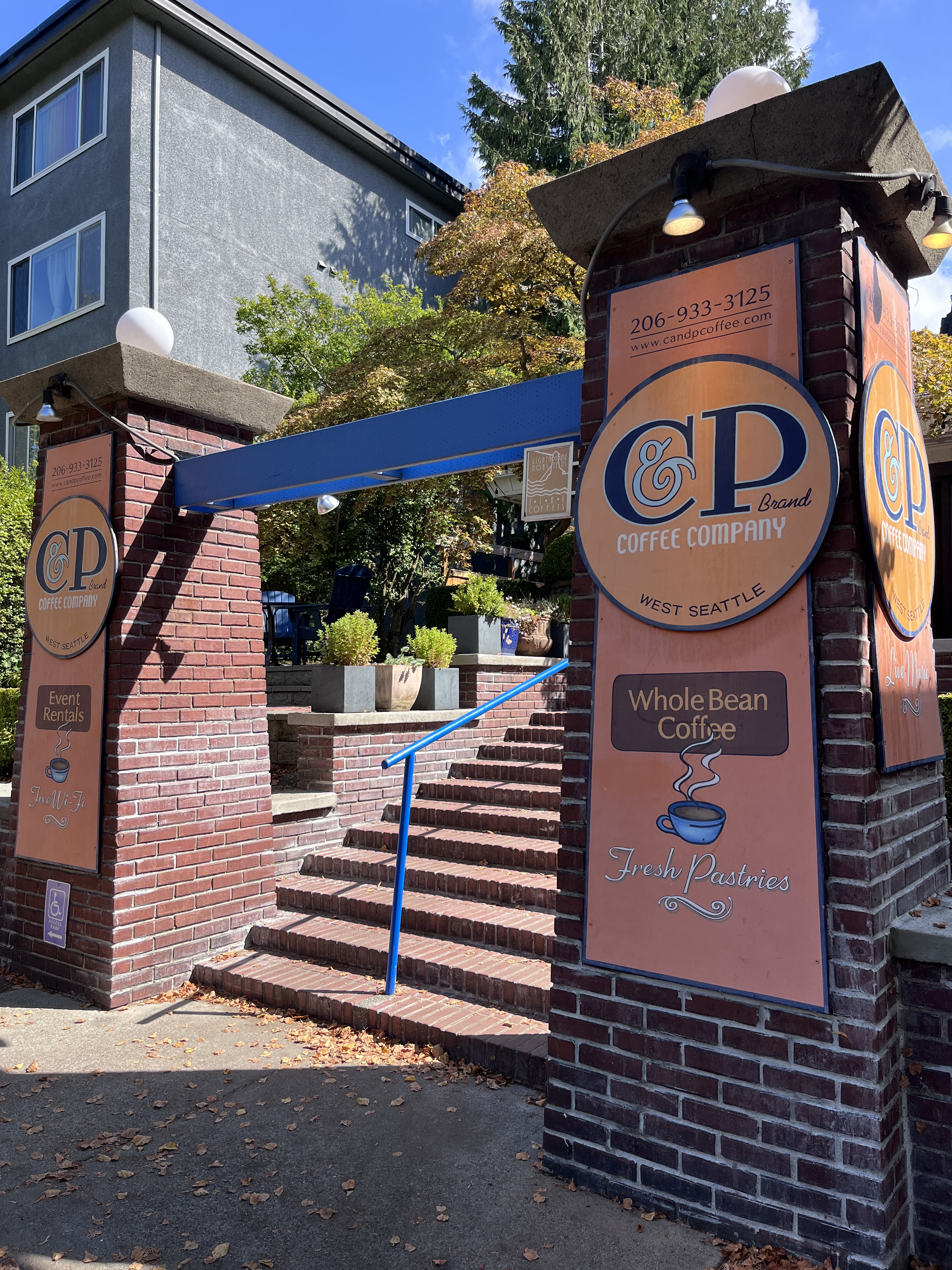
- Interactive map of C & P Coffee Company

Restaurant information
- Established: 2003
- Owners: Cameron and Pete Moores
- Location: Seattle, King, Washington, United States
- Coordinates: 47.5517°N 122.3868°W
- Website: candpcoffee.com

C & P Coffee Company is a coffee shop in West Seattle, Washington, United States.

== Description ==
The coffee shop C & P Coffee Company operates on California Avenue SW in West Seattle. The business operates from a century-old Craftsman house with a landscaped entrance. The interior has a seating capacity of 60 people. It has a books, seating, carpets, wood tables, and a fireplace. C & P has been described as a community gathering space and hosts various activities such as book clubs, handicraft, live music, meetings, open mics, poetry readings, storytelling, and wine tastings. Jilianne Bell of The Stranger said C & P "feels like a living room".

== History ==
C & P was co-founded by owners Cameron and Pete Moores in 2003. The business was potentially facing foreclosure, but raised enough funds to buy the land and building. C & P hosted a party in appreciation of the community's support. In 2022, C& P hosted a garden party as a fundraiser for a local food bank. Another community party was held in 2023 to celebrate the shop's twentieth anniversary.

== Reception ==
Lonely Planet has said C & P "has old-school PNW vibes to go alongside its quality coffee".
