= Cherry Street Coffee House =

Chain of coffeehouses in Seattle, Washington, U.S.

- Logo

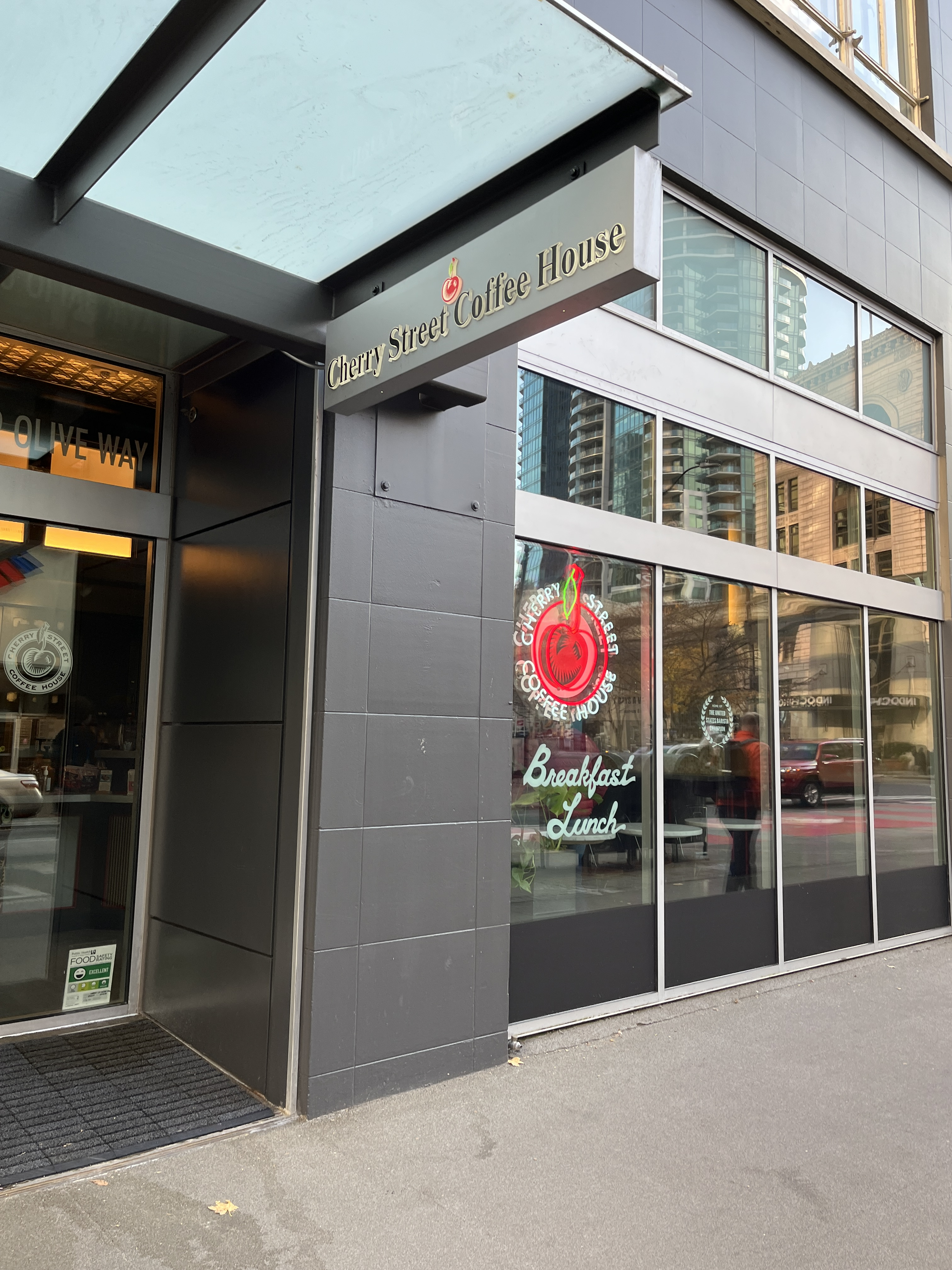
- Exterior of the shop in the Medical Dental Building on Olive Way, 2022

Cherry Street Coffee House is a chain of coffeehouses in Seattle, Washington, United States.

== History ==
The business was founded by co-owner Ali Ghambari. By April 2011, the business had five locations, and it had seven by late 2012. It planned to open an eighth outlet in the Pioneer Square district in 2013. A waterfront location that was expected to open in May 2017 was delayed and was never opened.

According to the Puget Sound Business Journal, the business "saw sales plummet ... down at about 60 percent" in March 2020, which was followed by the arrival of the COVID-19 pandemic. In May 2021, Benjamin Cassidy of Seattle Metropolitan said seven of the business's eleven locations had closed and the number of staff decreased from 120 to fewer than 20.

=== Menu ===
In addition to coffee, the business has served dirty chai lattes—chai tea with espresso—and a drink called Milkyway that consisted of mocha with caramel sauce. The food menu has included veggie burgers. The location at First Avenue and Clay Street has offered "dinner menu of authentic Persian dishes available for dine-in or take-out" on select days. The menu has also included bagels, pastries, salads, sandwiches, and soups.

In 2019, Cherry Street began serving cocktails and weekend brunch.

== Reception ==
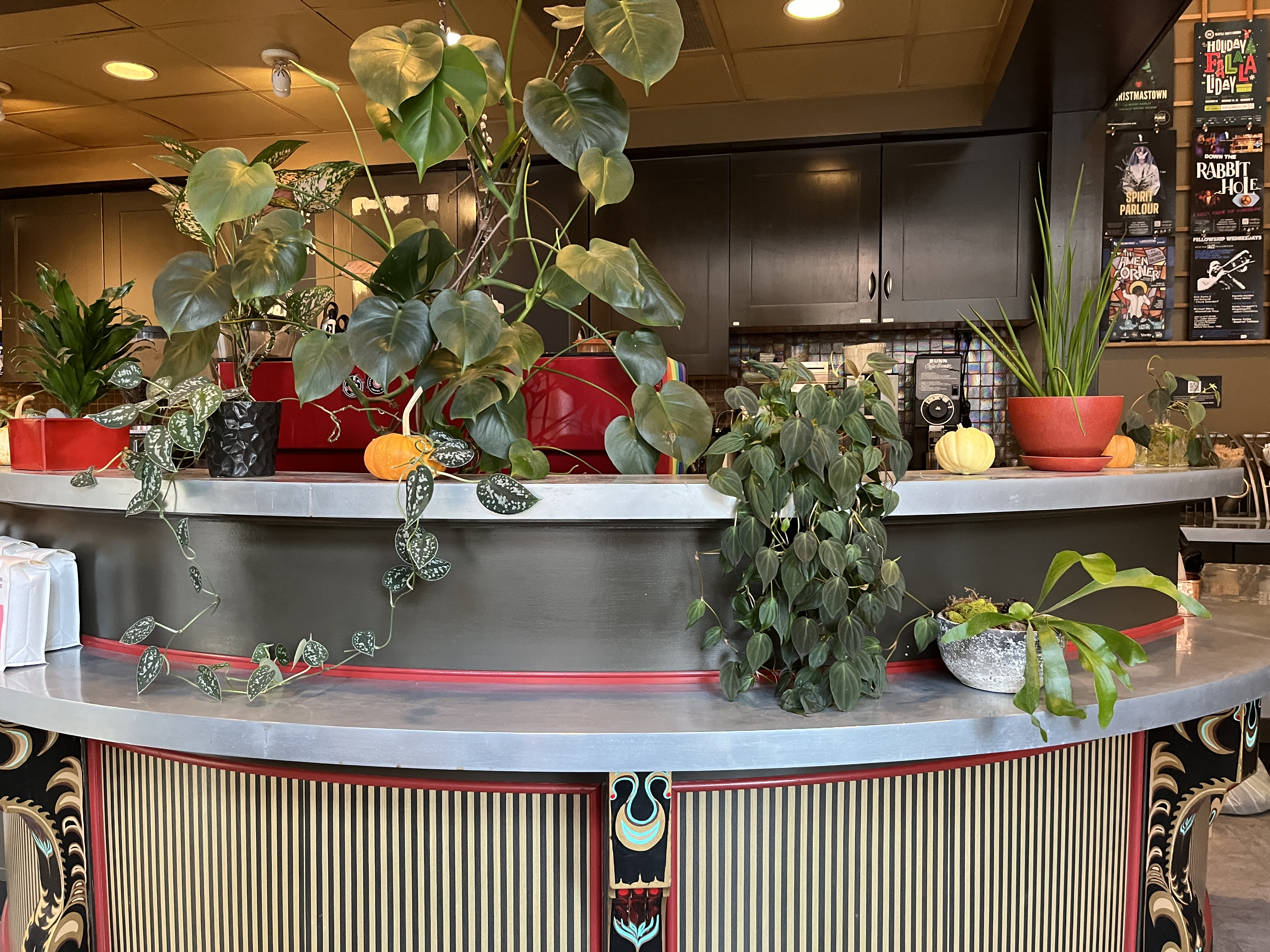
Interior of the Olive Way shop, 2022

In 2011, Allecia Vermillion of Eater Seattle said the Cherry Street chain's "internationally influenced menu includes a veggie burger that over the years has quietly racked up legions of rabid devotees, both vegetarian and omnivore". The website's Megan Hill included the business in a 2021 overview of Seattle's best "coffee shop bites" and wrote: "Cherry Street Coffee serves solid brews across its four locations, but the extensive food menu is a definitive draw. The menu is mostly built from ingredients made onsite, from pastries baked daily to bagel breakfast sandwiches to the Persian rice bowl and falafel." Brittany Fowler selected Cherry Street to represent Seattle in Business Insider's 2015 list of the best coffee shops in 13 major U.S. cities. The Daily Hive included the business in a 2020 list of the "12 best coffee shops to visit in Seattle".

In 2022, Molly O'Brien of Fodor's recommended, "Visit Cherry Street Coffee House to experience a welcoming community space that's been a part of the Seattle brew scene since the late 90s". Alison Fox included the business in Travel + Leisure's 2022 list the "coolest" coffee shops in the U.S. and said, "Seattle is known for its rainy weather, and this Seattle-based mini coffee chain is the perfect place to spend a cozy afternoon when the climate isn't exactly cooperating".

== See also ==
- List of coffeehouse chains
