= Café Allegro =

Coffeeshop in Seattle, Washington

Coordinates: 47.658519°N 122.312626°W

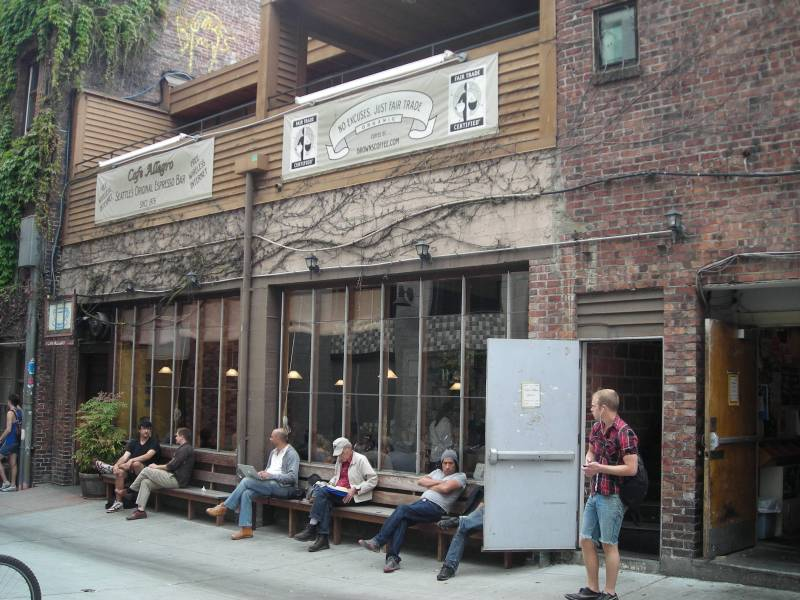
- Interactive map of Café Allegro

Restaurant information
- Established: 1975
- Location: Seattle, Washington, United States
- Website: seattleallegro.com

Café Allegro is a coffeeshop in the University District of Seattle, Washington, United States. It is notable for being one of the city's first espresso shops and for its role in the history of Starbucks, as the place where founding proprietor Dave Olsen designed the Starbucks coffee product line. Situated in an alleyway, the cafe features multiple entrances and rooms.

== History ==
The building in which Café Allegro is housed was built in 1909. The space was used for retail sales, a bank, and as a funeral home and mortuary until 1975 when it became Café Allegro and the first espresso bar in Seattle. Founder Dave Olsen chose the location because it was in an alley opposite the busiest entrance to the University of Washington campus. Allegro is also the oldest coffeehouse in Seattle.

Howard Schultz, the CEO during Starbucks' international expansion, said that "Café Allegro was a prototype for what Starbucks later became, although its style was more Bohemian and it did not sell coffee beans and merchandise or cater to an early-morning, urban, coffee-to-go clientele".

Nathaniel Jackson, who had worked at Cafe Allegro since 1975, and Chris Peterson, who had begun working there while a student in 1985, bought the cafe from Olsen in 1990.

In 2014 the cafe converted the second floor of its building into a coffee roastery.

In 2020 the owners of Cafe Allegro commented about the difficulty of maintaining small independent businesses in Seattle in the context of many other neighborhood businesses closing due to urban development policy.

== Dave Olsen ==
Schultz said of Olsen, "Dave Olsen is right at the heart of the memory of Starbucks... Dave is a rock, part of the foundation of the company" because under his supervision Schultz "never had to worry about the quality of the coffee".

Dave Olsen founded, owned, and managed Café Allegro for eleven years as his only coffeeshop. He purchased coffee by the pound from Starbucks, and co-developed an espresso roast with them which was darker than most other roasts but still lighter than the darkest roast. That espresso roast remains the standard Starbucks espresso offering. In the mid-1980s, Starbucks ownership and corporate governance changed, and Olsen became more involved in their activities. In August 1987, Olsen became the head buyer and roaster of Starbucks.
