= Anchorhead Coffee =

Coffee company based in Seattle, Washington, U.S.

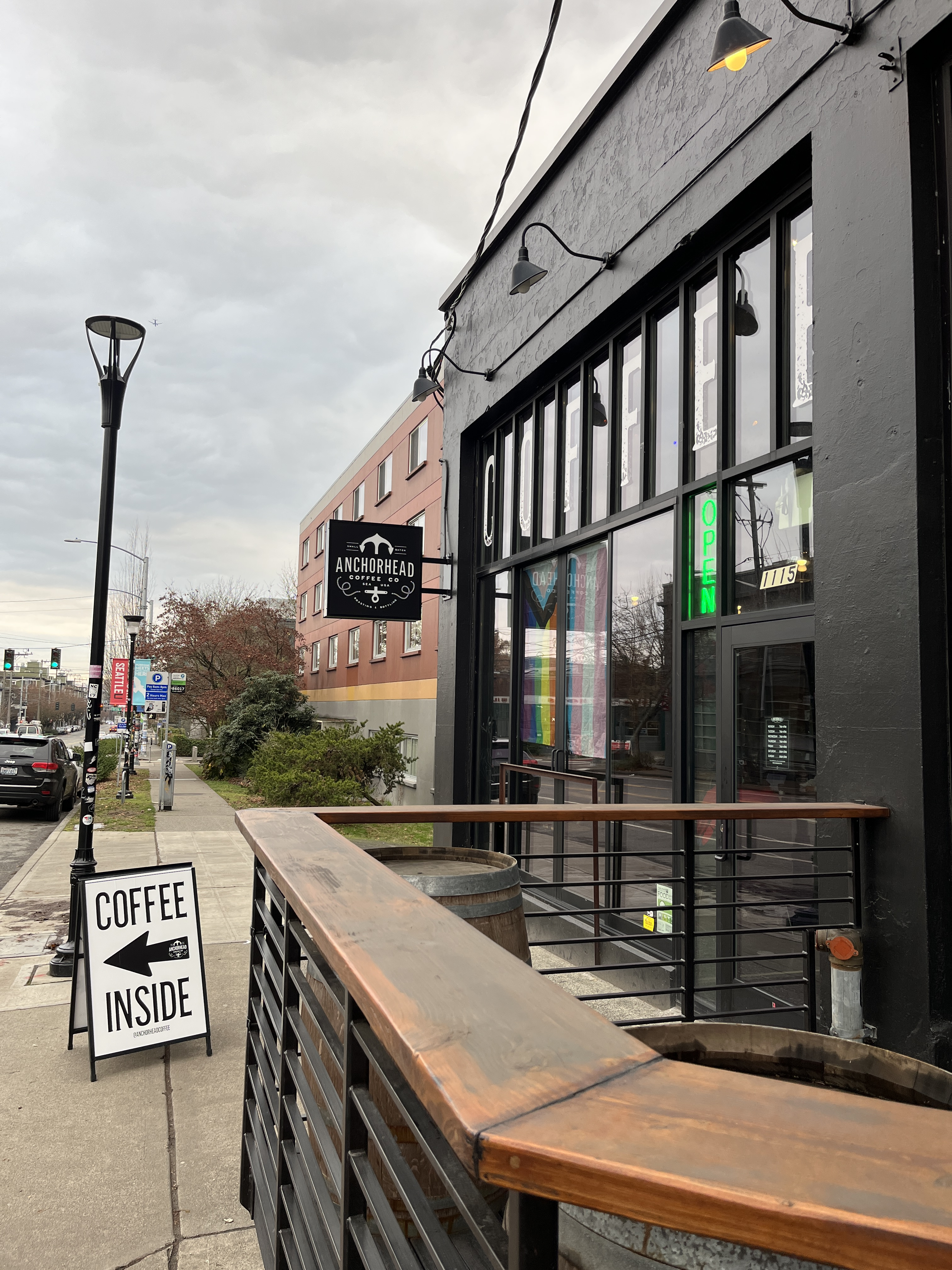
- Exterior of a coffee shop in Seattle

Anchorhead Coffee is coffee company founded and based in Seattle, in the U.S. state of Washington.

== Description ==
Seattle Metropolitan says, "Anchorhead creates a space that’s more inclusive than a coffee temple, but more restrained than a full-menu cafe." Along the coffee drinks, the menu has included banana bread, biscuit sandwiches, and the "quaffle" (described by The Infatuation as "part-cinnamon roll, part-croissant, and part-waffle").

== History ==
Founded by Jake Paulson and Mike Steiner, the business operates four retail coffee bars and a roastery in Duvall, Washington, as of March 2022. In addition to Seattle, Anchorhead has operated in Bellevue and Issaquah, as well as Nashville, Tennessee.

In 2015, Anchorhead won the America's Best Espresso competition at Coffeefest Portland. In 2022, Anchorhead created the Hey Bae (hazelnut ube latte) as part of the Nashville Pride Coffee Crawl. The business also released a holiday blend Red Shield Roast in partnership with The Salvation Army.

== Reception ==
Allecia Vermillion included Anchorhead in Seattle Metropolitan's 2022 overview of the city's "destination" coffee shops.

== See also ==
- List of coffeehouse chains
