= Zeitgeist Coffee =

Coffee shop in Seattle, Washington, U.S.

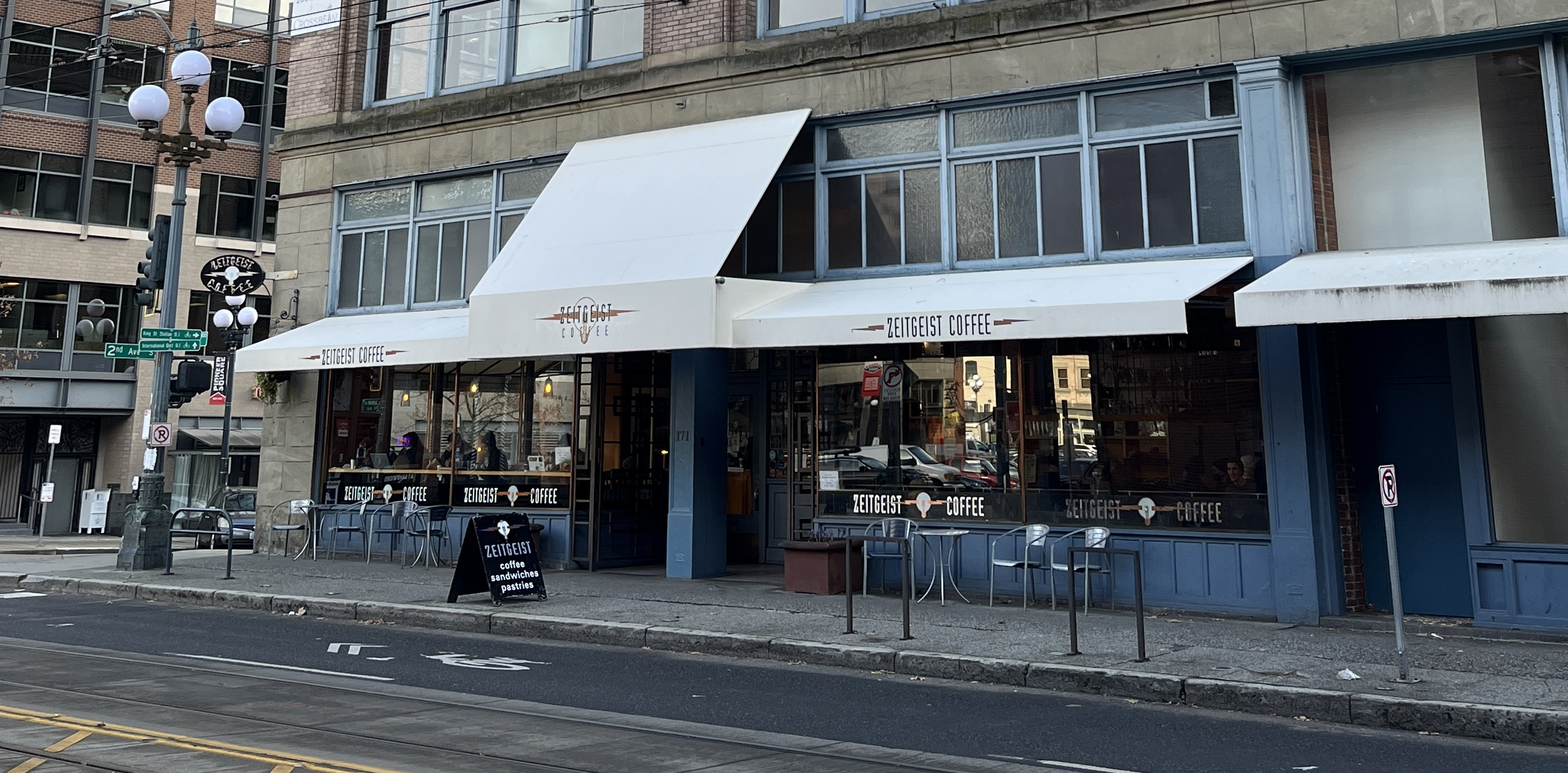
- The coffee shop's exterior, 2022
- Interactive map of Zeitgeist Coffee

Restaurant information
- Location: Seattle, King, Washington, United States
- Coordinates: 47.59910°N 122.33185°W
- Website: zeitgeistcoffee.com

Zeitgeist Coffee is a coffeehouse in Seattle's Pioneer Square neighborhood, in the U.S. state of Washington. The business was established in 1997.

== Description and history ==
Zeitgeist Coffee has operated in downtown Seattle's Pioneer Square district since the late 1990s. The coffeehouse has an "industrial vibe", according to Curbed. In addition to coffee drinks, the menu has included almond croissants and other baked goods, as well as soups, salads, and sandwiches.

Zeitgeist was once part of Top Pot Doughnuts.

== Reception ==
Seattle Metropolitan says, "Coffee and art are a perfect fusion at this Pioneer Square coffee house." In 2011, the Seattle Post-Intelligencer said, "Old Seattle has some new sparks, and Zeitgeist is one of them... Roomy and cozy, it's good both for conversation and escape. Got a big group? Try the long bench by the window. You'll want to stay a while." In his 2014 article "36 Hours in Seattle", David Laskin of The New York Times wrote, "If you're flagging, grab a table at Zeitgeist Coffee and settle in for a macchiato and ginger molasses cookie while you peruse arts and events listings in the rack of local weeklies and magazines."

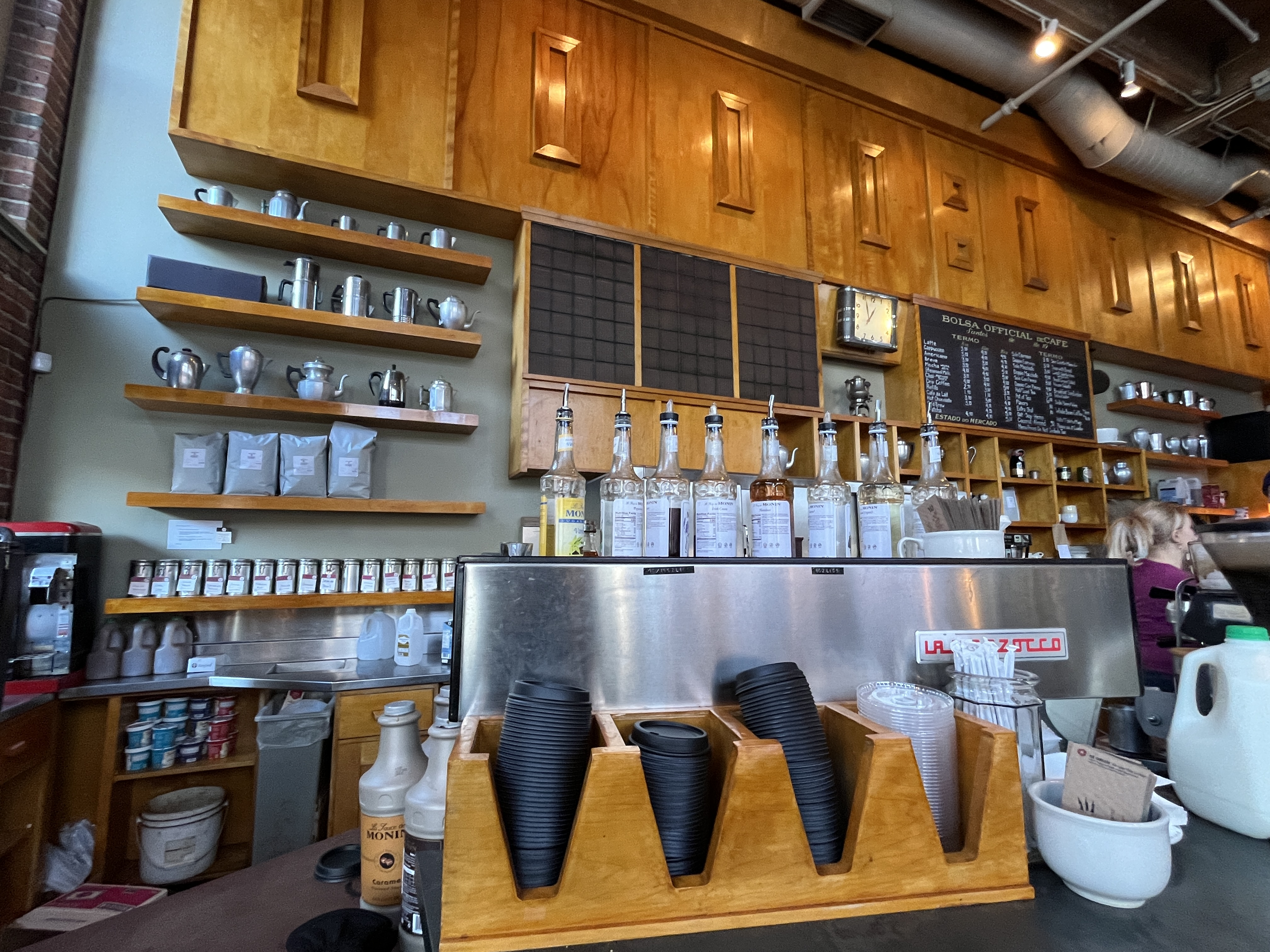
Interior in 2022

In 2015, Matt Viser of The Boston Globe said, "Zeitgeist Coffee is among the top places in Seattle to sit for a cup." Writers included Zeitgeist in The Stranger's 2018 list of "our favorite" Seattle coffee shops and wrote, "This coffee shop was one of the first classic Seattle cafes, with exposed brick walls, well-made coffee, beautiful cabinetry, and art. The interior is vaguely industrial, the tables are plentiful, and the people who work behind the counter are musicians and artists."

Donald Olson of Frommer's gave the business two out of three stars and wrote, "This spacious European-style coffeehouse in Pioneer Square is an urban oasis and cultural hub that serves up film screenings and rotating exhibits by local artists along with its popular Italian beans, illy Caffe." Lonely Planet's Doug Murray said in 2022, "Zeitgeist Coffee will brew your first (and possibly best) cup of Seattle coffee." Ben Bolch included the business in the Los Angeles Times' 2022 overview of "the best places to eat, sleep, watch football and have fun in Pac-12 country" and said, "Being in Seattle, you're going to expect amazing coffee. Zeitgeist is the spot to get it. By the time you finish your cup of java (with a refill or three), you're going to want an ownership stake."
