= Ghost Note Coffee =

Coffee shop in Seattle, Washington, U.S.

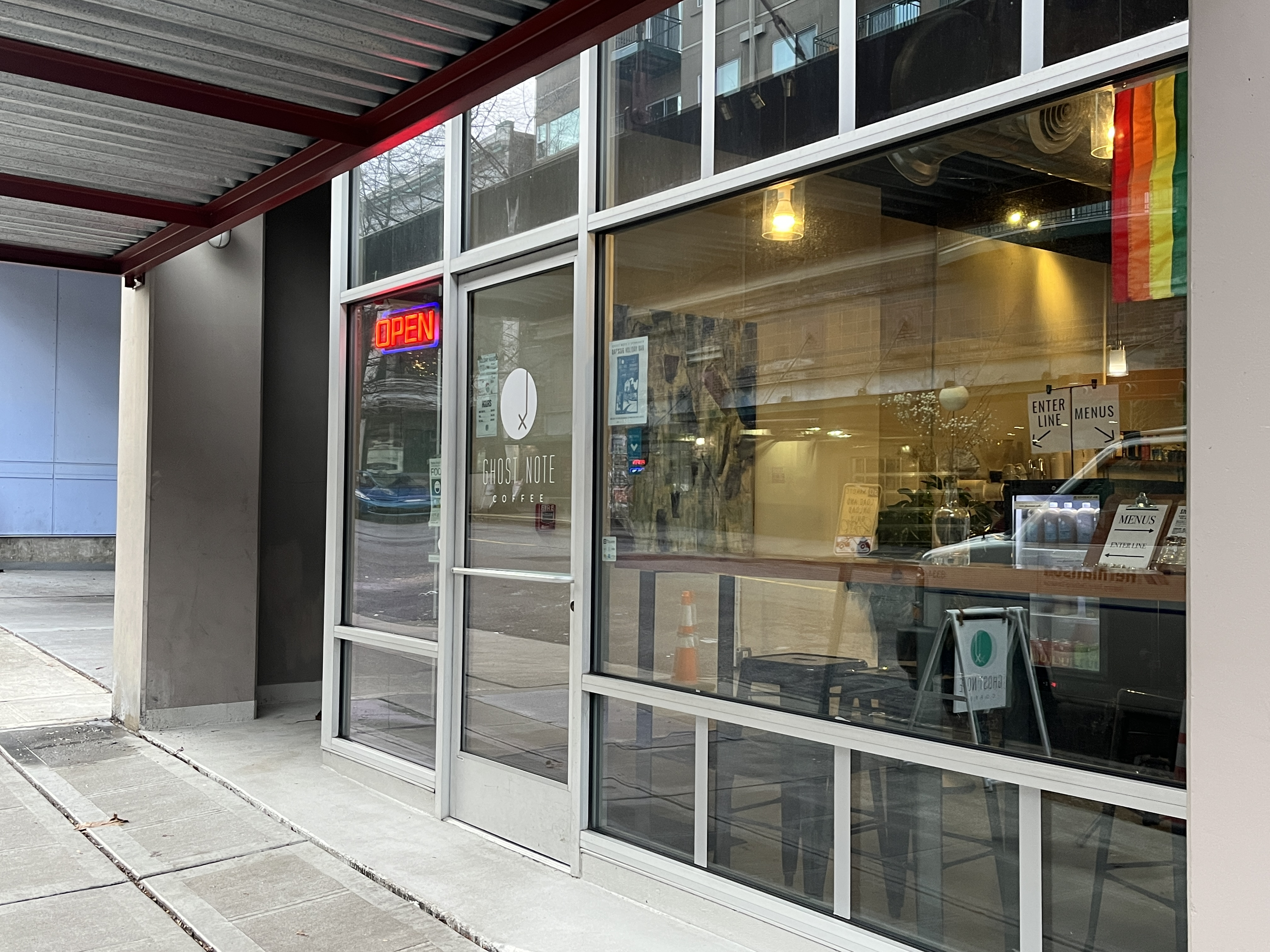
- The coffee shop's exterior in 2022
- Interactive map of Ghost Note Coffee

Restaurant information
- Location: 1623 Bellevue Avenue, Seattle, King, Washington, 98122, United States
- Coordinates: 47.6159°N 122.3270°W

Ghost Note Coffee is a coffee shop on Capitol Hill, in Seattle, Washington. Christos Andrews and Lee Hampton opened the coffee shop on Bellevue Avenue on March 14, 2017.

== Description ==
Ghost Note Coffee operates on Bellevue Avenue, on Seattle's Capitol Hill. According to Sprudge, the name of the business "refers to a musical note that at once carries rhythmic value and no discernible pitch".

The menu includes espresso tonics and lattes. The Lush Life has almond milk and orange blossom honey, and the Sun Ship has grapefruit rosemary syrup, coconut water, lime, and carbonated water. The Soundscape has vegan cream, non-alcoholic rum, and root beer bitters. The rotating drink menu has also included an espresso float, the London Smog, the Oat Nog, and other seasonal options.

Food options include toasts with bread from Columbia City Bakery, pastries by Salmon Berry Goods, and macarons from Alexandra's Macarons.

== History ==
In January 2017, Eater Seattle described plans for Broadcast Coffee owner Barry Faught to sell a cafe to friends Christos Andrews and Lee Hampton. Ghost Note would use Broadcast as a coffee roaster. Ghost Note opened on March 14, 2017.

The Sun Ship was originally created by Andrews for Coffee Masters NYC in 2017.

== Reception ==
Aimee Rizzo and Kayla Sager-Riley included Ghost Note in The Infatuation's 2023 list of Seattle's best iced coffee options.
