= URL Coffee =

Coffee shop in Seattle, Washington, U.S.

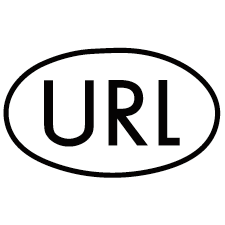

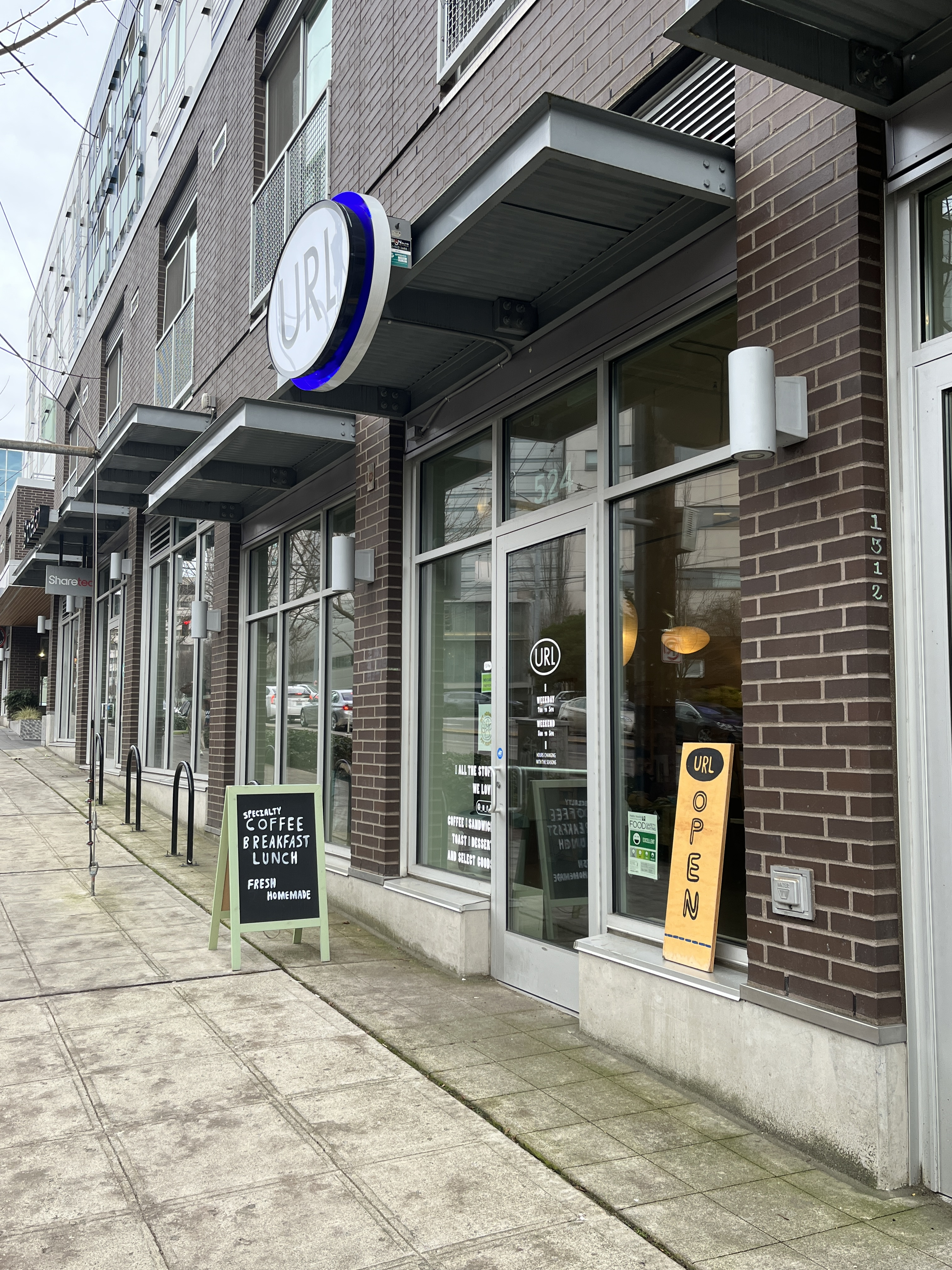
- The coffee shop's exterior, 2023
- Interactive map of URL Coffee

Restaurant information
- Established: March 2021
- Owners: Ethan Choi; Zoey Jung
- Location: 524 Broadway, Seattle, King, Washington, 98122, United States
- Coordinates: 47.6067°N 122.3205°W
- Website: www.urlcoffee.square.site

URL Coffee is a coffee shop in Seattle's First Hill neighborhood, in the U.S. state of Washington. The business was established in 2021 and has been owned by Ethan Choi and Zoey Jung.

== Description ==
URL Coffee is a small coffee shop on Broadway in Seattle's First Hill neighborhood. Eater Seattle has described the interior as both a contemporary and mid-century modern space with lots of light, stools made from skateboard decks, and "a note of punkish whimsy". The menu includes coffee and espresso drinks such as cold brews, macchiatos, matcha lattes, and mochas, as well as sandwiches and avocado toasts. The "Walk to Work" on the signature menu is an iced latte with delicious sweet cream and cacao dusted on top.The business uses beans from Maru Coffee, roasted in Los Angeles, but selection varies on pour over.

== History ==
The business opened in March 2021. It has been owned by spouses Ethan Choi and Zoey Jung.

== Reception ==
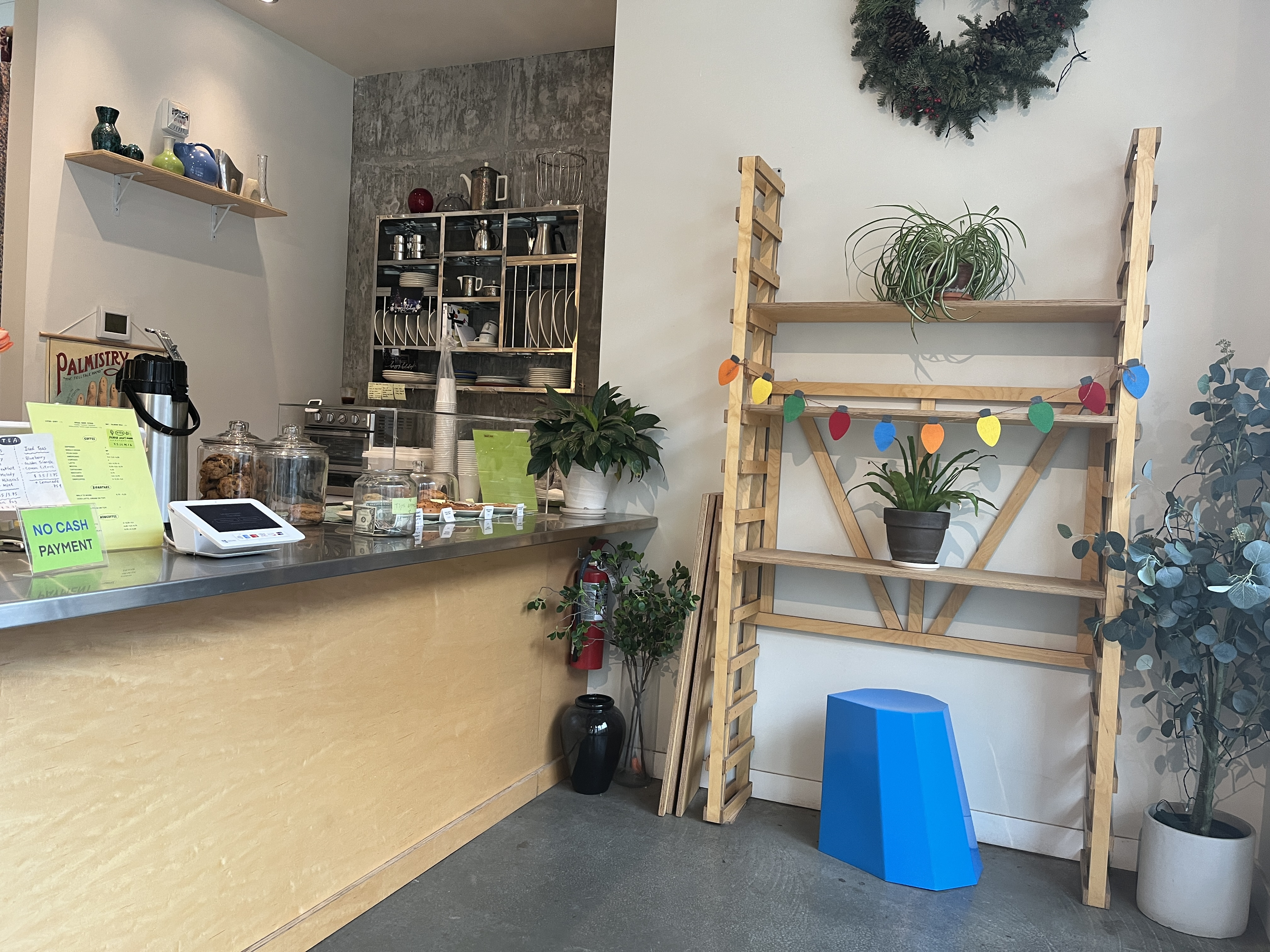
Interior of the coffee shop in 2023

Aimee Rizzo of The Infatuation wrote, "URL looks less like a coffee shop and more like those fully-furnished model rooms at CB2 that make you feel bad about your own interior design skills (or lack thereof)... The hygge vibes of natural wood and abstract paper lanterns make for an incredibly relaxing work session, as long as there's a seat available among the single long table and couple of small ones." She also opined, "If you're looking for somewhere to get work done in First Hill, URL is an oasis in a neighborhood full of hospitals." In 2023, Rizzo included URL in the website's list of the city's best cafes for working, and she and Kayla Sager-Riley included the Walk to Work in an overview of Seattle's best iced coffee. The duo wrote, "we can vouch that it's perfect for walking to work". Rizzo and Gabe Guarente included the business in a 2024 overview of Seattle's best coffee shops.

In Eater Seattle's 2023 overview of recommended cold brews and seasonal coffee drinks in the city, Rachel Hopke and Harry Cheadle said Choi's experience as a furniture collector "comes through in the attention to design detail and meticulously crafted beverages". Cheadle and Mark Van Streefkerk called URL "a designer's dream" and recommended the tomato ricotta toast in the website's 2024 overview of Seattle's thirteen "essential" coffee shops. Melissa Santos said the sandwiches are "pretty good" in Axios Seattle's 2024 list of nine coffee shops for working remotely in the city.
