= General Porpoise =

American doughnut chain

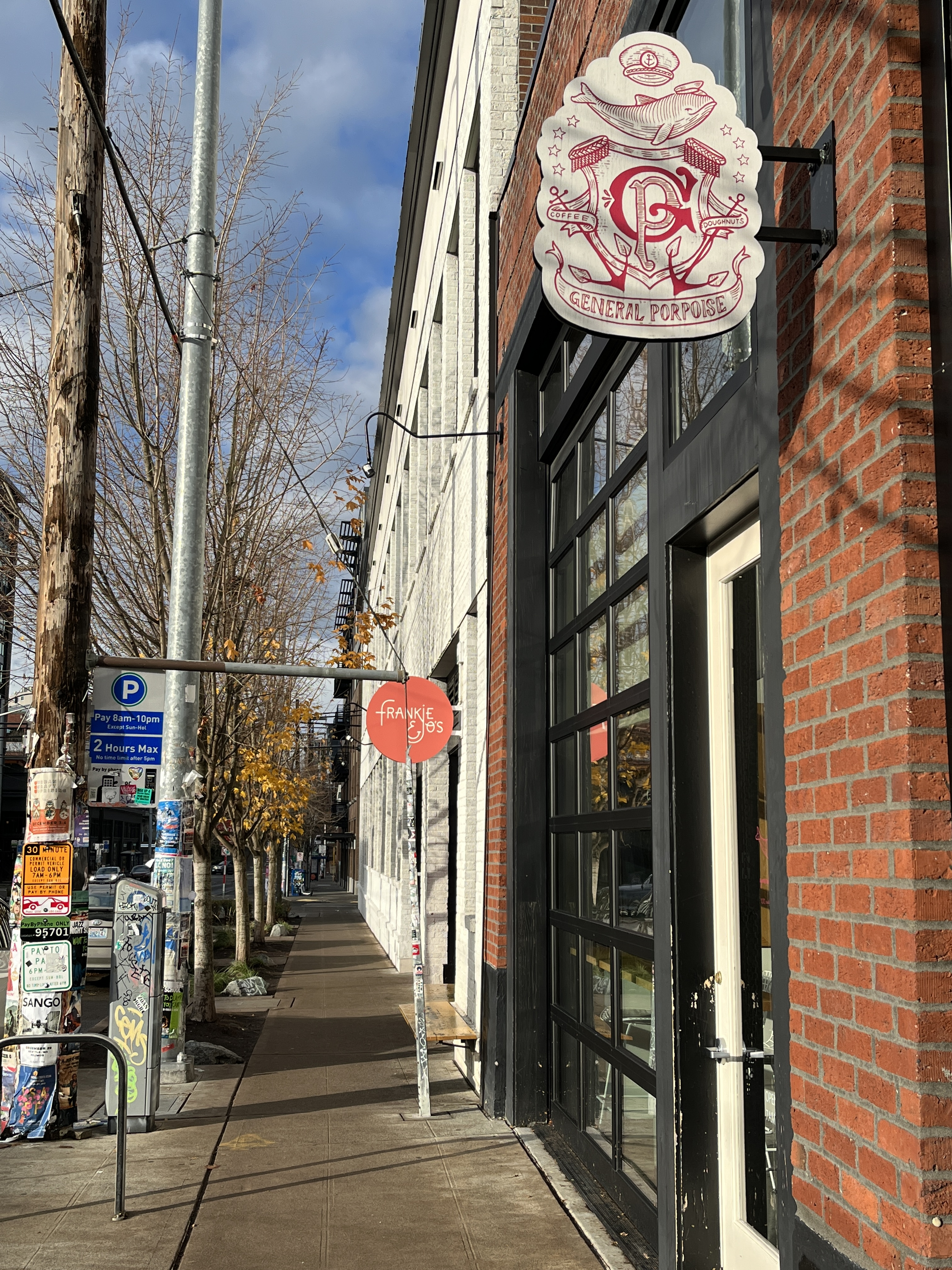
- Exterior of the Capitol Hill location, 2022

Restaurant information
- Location: Seattle, Washington, United States
- Website: gpdoughnuts.com

General Porpoise is a chain of doughnut shops in the United States. The business has multiple locations in Seattle and previously operated in Los Angeles.

== Description ==
The menu includes doughnuts filled with cream and custard, including chocolate marshmallow, lemon, peanut butter and grape jelly, and vanilla varieties.

== History ==
The business has multiple locations in Seattle. The original restaurant opened on Capitol Hill. The Pioneer Square restaurant opened in March 2018. In 2018, plans were announced to open in the Laurelhurst neighborhood.

Previously, the business operated in Los Angeles. The restaurant at Palisades Village closed in 2019.

== Reception ==
Thrillist has said, "we hear the lemon curd will make a superfan out of you." The website's included General Porpoise in a 2022 list of "The 32 Best Donut Shops in America". Allecia Vermillion included the business in Seattle Metropolitan's 2022 overview of the city's best doughnuts.

== See also ==
- List of doughnut shops
- List of restaurant chains in the United States
