= Kaladi Brothers Coffee =

American coffee company based in Anchorage, Alaska

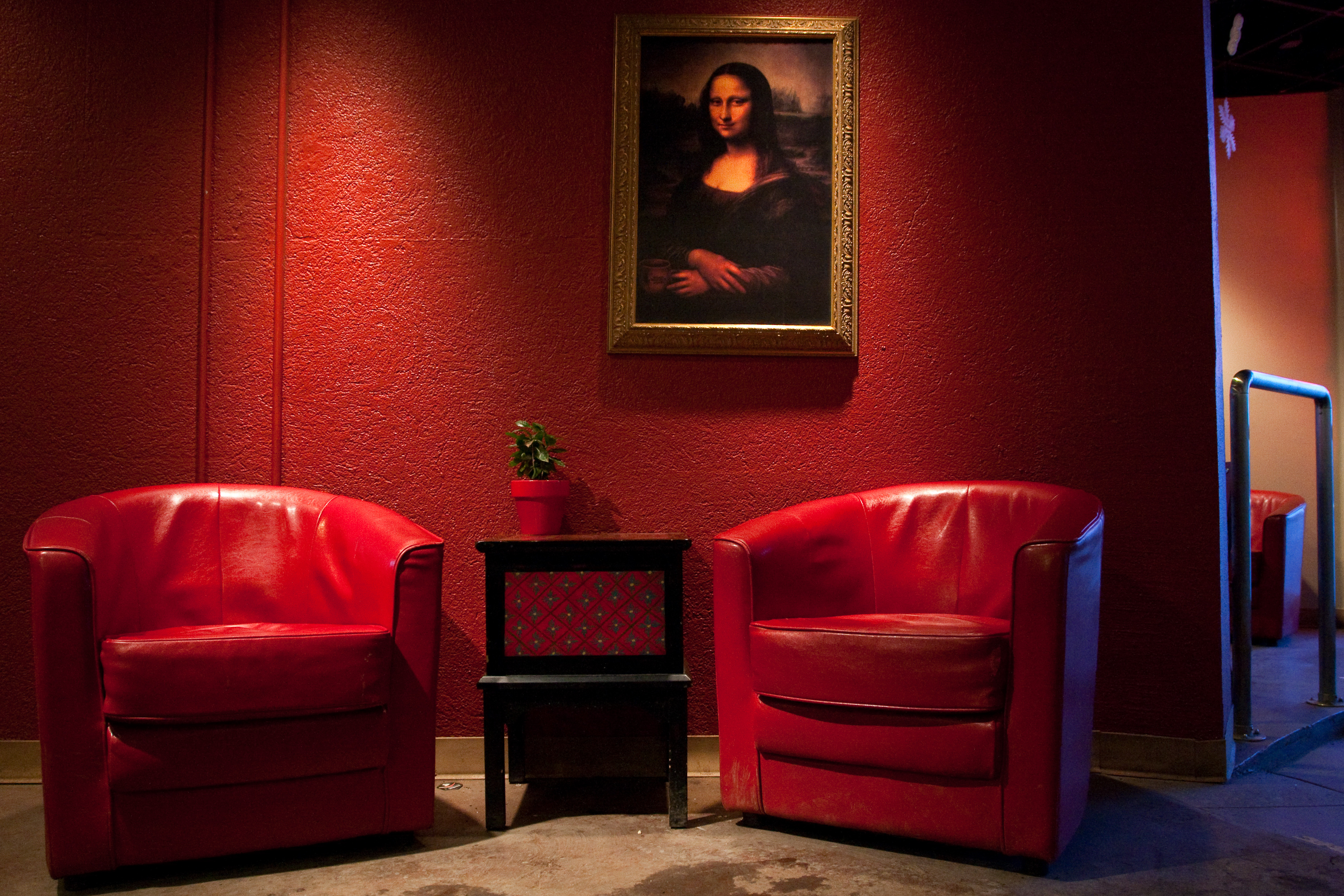
- Interior of a coffee shop in Anchorage, Alaska
- Number of locations: 14 (2025)
- Area served: Anchorage, Alaska
- Products: Coffee
- Website: kaladi.com

Kaladi Brothers Coffee is an American coffee company, based in Anchorage, Alaska. The business began operating from a single espresso cart in 1984. By 2021, there were fifteen stores in the U.S. states of Alaska and Washington.

== History ==
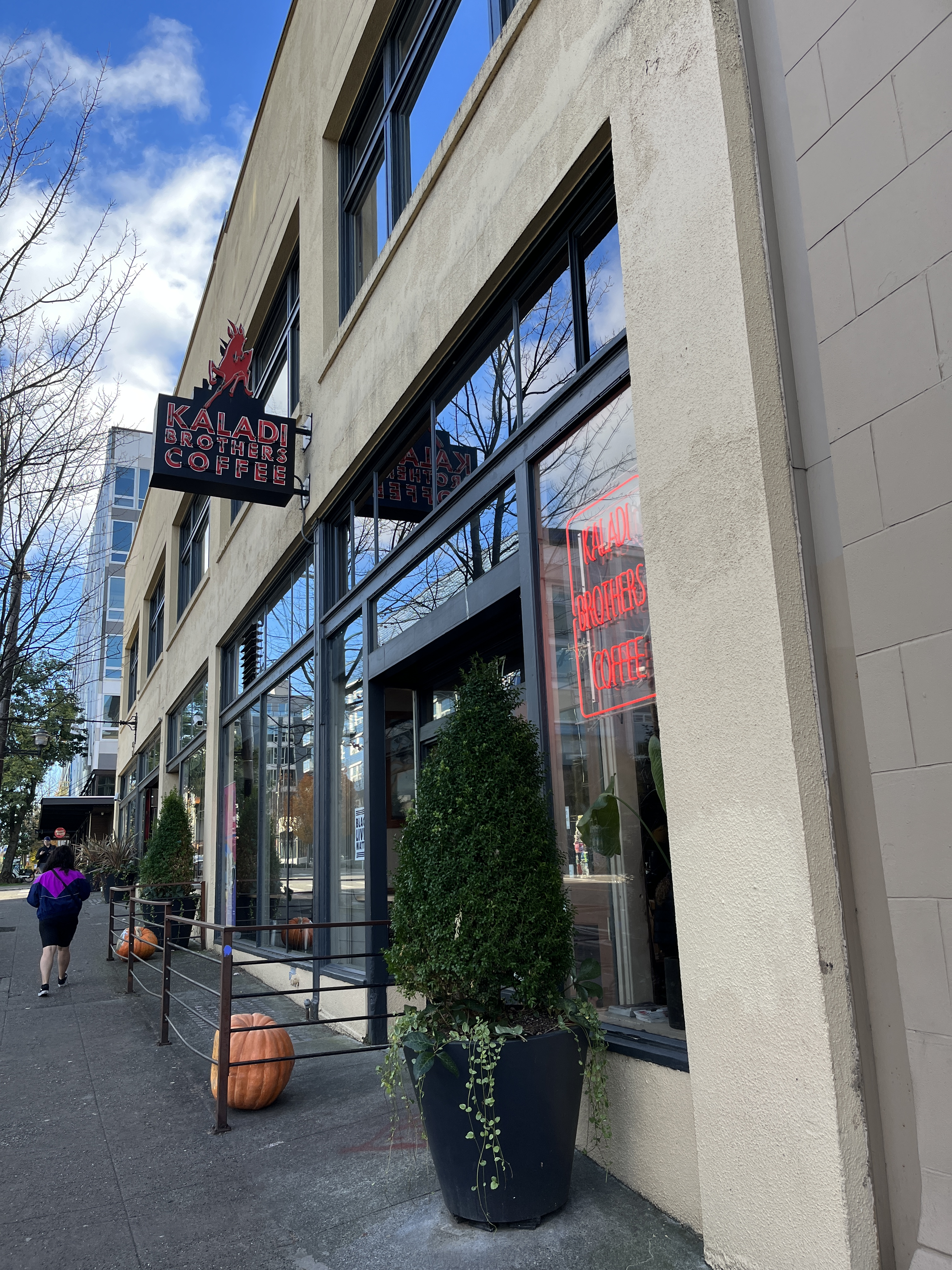
Exterior of the shop in Seattle, 2022

The company earned approximately $4.5 million and $5 million in total sales in 2003 and 2004, respectively.

There were 13 locations by 2009, and 16 locations in 2016. In 2021, there were fifteen stores in the U.S. states of Alaska and Washington.

Kaladi operated in Seattle from 2006 to 2023.

== Reception ==
Willona M. Sloan included Kaladi in Paste magazine's 2017 list of "The Best Coffees Coming Out of Alaska". Mia Mercado included selected the company for Alaska in Eat This, Not That's 2021 list of "The Best Coffee Shop in Every State".
