= Monorail Espresso =

Coffeehouse in Seattle

Coordinates: 47°36′40″N 122°20′06″W

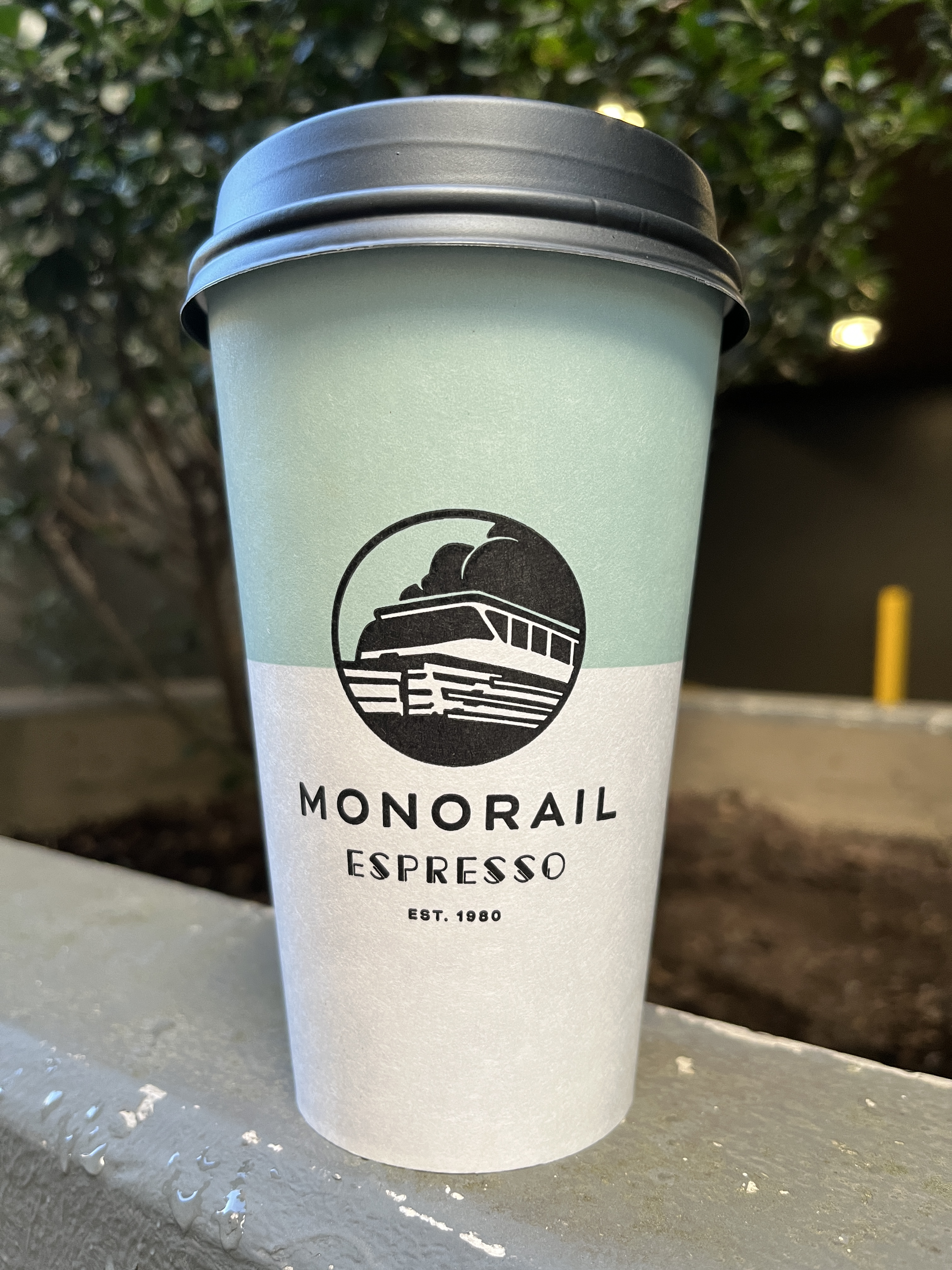
Coffee in a branded paper cup, 2022

Monorail Espresso is a coffeehouse in Seattle. It is notable as having been founded as the first espresso cart in the world. An espresso cart is a food cart from which a barista can make espresso. The business now operates as a walkup window with multiple locations.

== Opening and early years ==
The original Monorail Espresso

On December 1, 1980, Seattle proprietor Chuck Beek set up an espresso cart at Westlake Mall under the Seattle Center Monorail as an experiment to see whether there was a market for espresso sold on the street rather than in a traditional coffeehouse. The permit for the location at the time was $10.

The coffee cart found success in serving Ristretto styled coffee to the early commuters of Seattle mornings. One of the most highly requested orders in the early 90's were "skinny lattes" which consisted of two espresso shots combined with non-fat milk. The cart's close proximity to local corporations like Nordstrom and I. Magnin at the time made it appropriate place to take coffee breaks for busy workers who lacked time. The espresso combined with convenient location contributed to the popularity of the cart.

Monorail Espresso was eventually pushed out of its original Westlake location. Due to the local construction of the growing downtown Seattle along with the raising costs for permits, owner Beek had to move the cart several times. As espresso carts became more common in the area, Beek had found it to be increasingly difficult to find a prime location for Monorail Espresso.

The business model of an espresso cart proved successful but the business decided to convert to a walkup window in 1997.

== Present ==
The coffeehouse is located at 510 Pike Street in Seattle and today is owned and operated by former Monorail barista, Aimee Peck. Peck initially became a barista for Monorail Espresso in 2008. In 2012, Peck, a manager at the time bought Monorail Espresso from previous owner Chuck Beek.

In 2015, Monorail opened a second location in the lobby of the Columbia Center, located at 701 Fifth Avenue in Seattle. This location is the only commercial establishment in the building's 5th Avenue lobby.

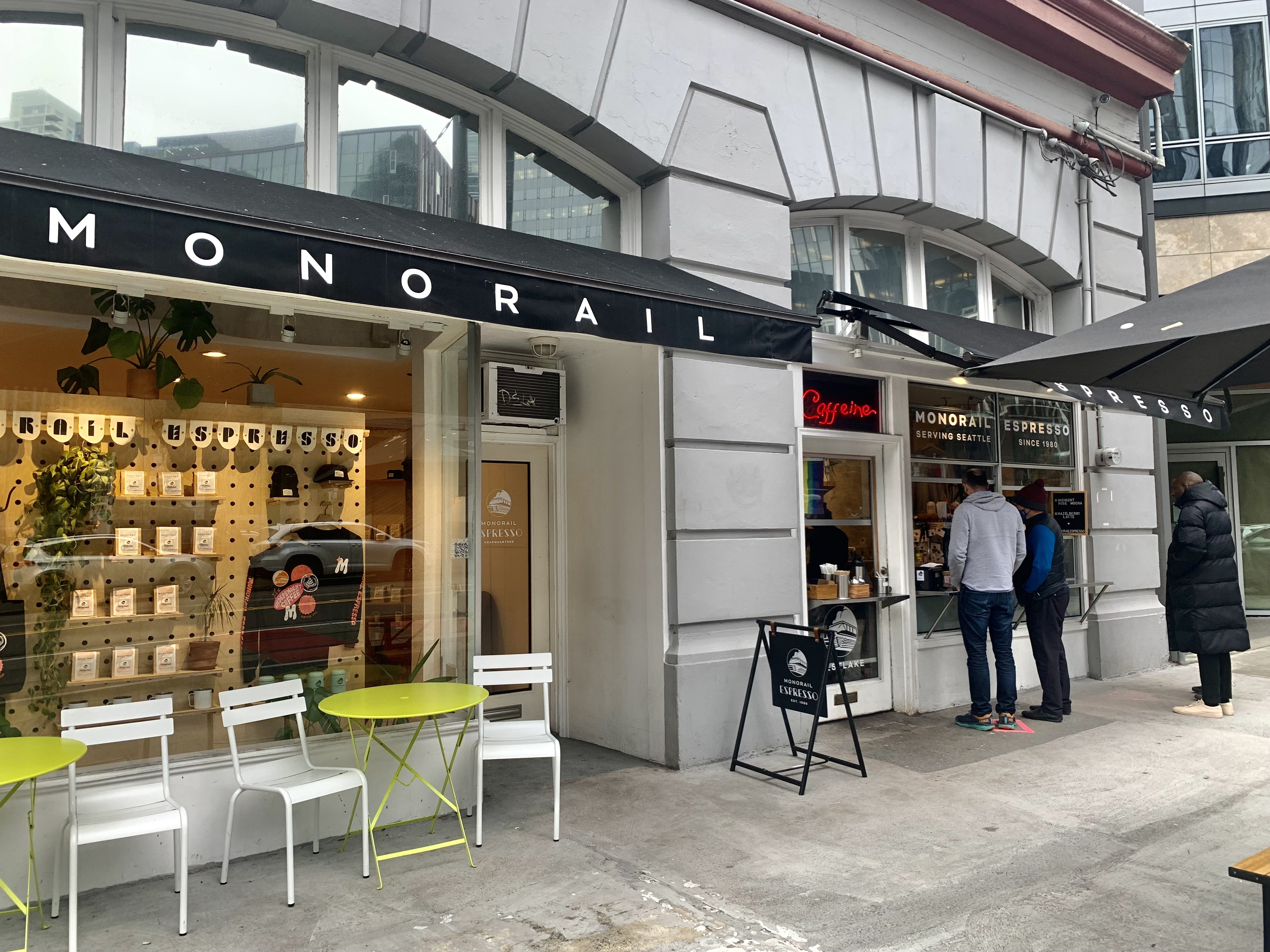
Monorail Espresso location on Westlake Ave in 2022

In 2018, Monorail opened a third location on Westlake Avenue between 8th and 9th Avenues.

In 2022, Monorail opened a fourth location (on 4/4) on Fourth Avenue between Union and Pike Streets.

Until the COVID-19 pandemic hit, Monorail Espresso's revenue was increasing steadily. Due to the business' dependence on live foot traffic as a main source of business, the pandemic decreased their sales dramatically. However, as a forty-year-old downtown staple they were given a grant from local corporation, Amazon, in efforts to support small businesses in the area. They also benefited from the Paycheck Protection Program in later 2020.

Through a program created by Hyatt Hotels Corporation named "Hyatt Loves Local" which was made in order to help support local small businesses facing a decline in sales as a result of the pandemic. Monorail Espresso worked with local downtown hotel, Motif, to create a temporary shop in their lobby where they sold Monorail Espresso merchandise like coffer growlers, shirts and other coffee accessories.

The business is still running today with a staff of 16 people and the help of owner, Aimee Peck. They continue to serve double-shot espresso drinks and their popular chubby cookies.

== See also ==
- List of coffeehouse chains
- List of restaurant chains in the United States
