= Overcast Coffee Company =

Coffee shop in Seattle, Washington, U.S.

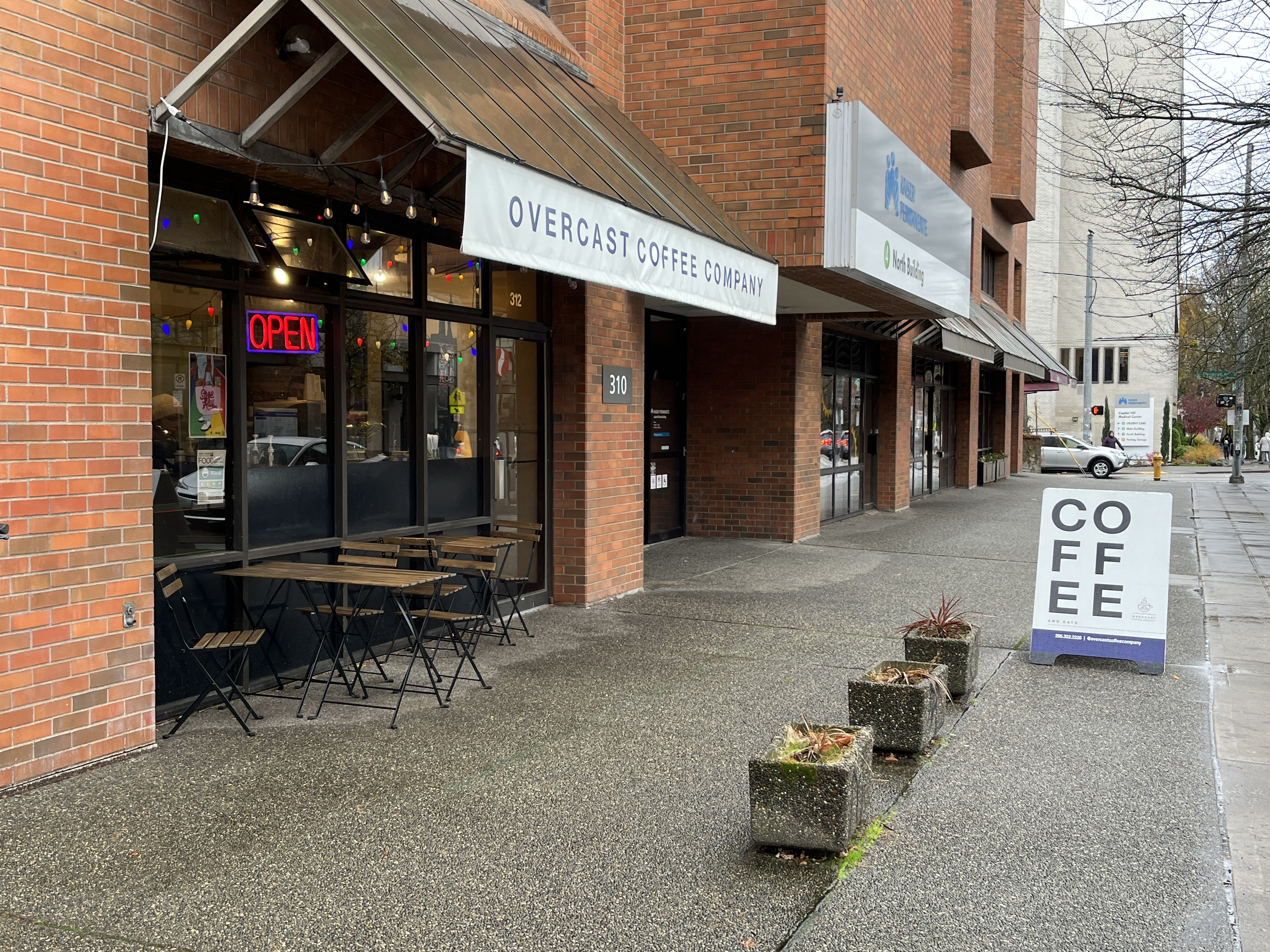
- Exterior of the coffee shop in the Kaiser Permanente building, 2022
- Interactive map of Overcast Coffee Company

Restaurant information
- Owner: Jonathan Pak
- Location: Seattle, King, Washington, United States
- Coordinates: 47.6209°N 122.3125°W
- Website: overcastcoffeecompany.com

Overcast Coffee Company is a coffee shop with two locations in Seattle, in the U.S. state of Washington.

== Description ==
Overcast Coffee Company has two locations on Seattle's Capitol Hill. In addition to coffee and tea drinks such as Americanos and masala chais, the business has served pastries, beer, and wine. The coffee shop on Union Street features an exterior mural by Stevie Shao.

== History ==
Jonathan Pak opened the first shop in the Kaiser Permanente building on 15th Avenue in June 2020. In 2021, a second location opened on Union Street, sharing space with the Métier bike shop (also known as Metier Racing and Coffee). The second location is known as the Overcast Coffee Bar.

== Reception ==
Mark Van Streefkerk and Gabe Guarente included the business in Eater Seattle's November 2021 overview of "the hottest coffee shops to check out". Zuri Anderson ranked Overcast first in iHeart's 2022 overview of Seattle's best coffee shops, based on Yelp reviews.

== See also ==
- List of coffeehouse chains
- List of restaurant chains in the United States
