= Drinkmore Cafe =

Coffee shop in Seattle, Washington, U.S.

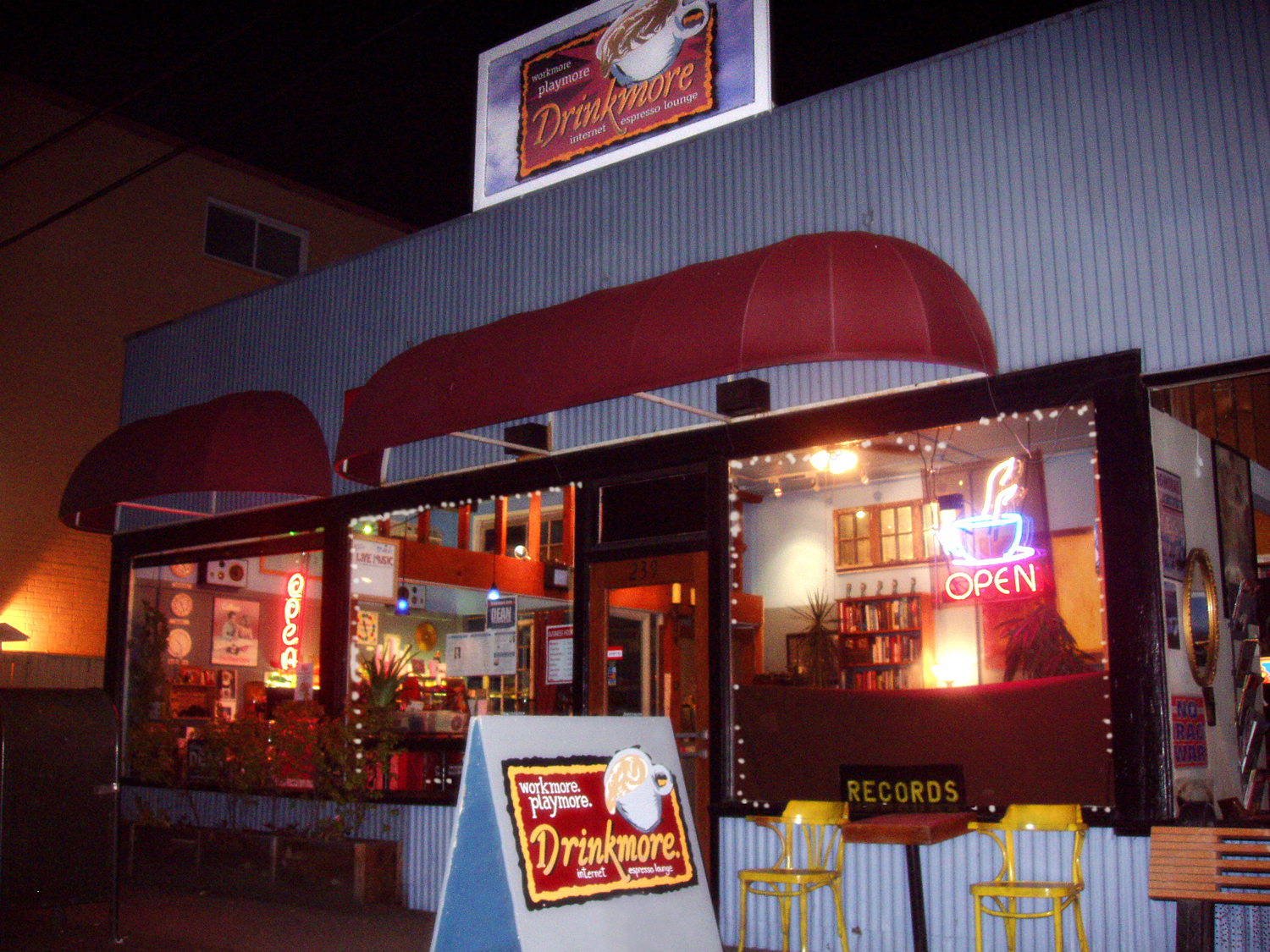
- Interactive map of Drinkmore Cafe

Restaurant information
- Established: April 1, 2000
- Closed: 2004
- Location: Seattle, Washington, United States
- Coordinates: 47°37′14.04″N 122°19′35.09″W

The Drinkmore Cafe was a coffee shop on Capitol Hill in Seattle, Washington.

== History ==
Opened on April 1, 2000, as the BitStar, The Drinkmore was owned and run by software executive and Seattle mayoral candidate Scott Kennedy. In addition to serving Espresso Vivace coffee and baked good from Macrina Bakery, the cafe sponsored live local music, and bought and sold used records and VHS movies. It also served as an early headquarters of Seattle Wireless and Brainsheet, and was the Howard Dean meetup spot during his 2004 presidential campaign.

The cafe was the first commercial business to offer free wireless internet services Wi-Fi on the West Coast, as reported by InfoWorld Since portable laptops already accounted for 20% of PCs sold that year, more workers had the ability to take advantage of remote workspaces.

The cafe's original location, a 1905 industrial textile coloring warehouse at the corner of Bellevue Avenue East and Thomas Street, was demolished in 2014 after Kennedy sold the building to a developer, who replaced it with new condominiums.
