= Not for Tourists =

Not For Tourists (abbreviated NFT) is a series of guides to major cities. Unlike traditional tourist guide books, NFT guides are designed for people who live in or commute to their subject cities. As such, they differ in several ways from the typical guide book. In addition to highlighting landmarks, restaurants, bars, stores, and so on, NFT guides point out "essentials" like supermarkets, parking lots, pharmacies, and banks.

Not For Tourists currently publishes yearly guidebooks through Simon & Schuster. Though they previously operated a website providing travel advice, the registration expired and was not renewed on April 30, 2021. As of August 2021, there is a website operating at the former domain name, but it does not appear to be affiliated.

== History ==
NFT originated in Jane Pirone's early-morning search for an open gas station in 1990. She and Rob Tallia published the Not For Tourists Guide to Manhattan 2000 ten years later. The name was changed to the "Guide to New York City" in 2002, which also saw the release of NFT's second city, Los Angeles. In late 2003, the guides were opened up to advertisements for financial reasons.

== Format ==
NFT guides have simple black and silver covers. The pocket-sized guides have very small typefaces and no photography.

In addition to having little introductory/orientation material (every NFT simply begins with an introductory letter, a table of contents, and then a map of each neighborhood for that city), NFT differs from other guides in that its trim size is variable—the New York City guide is pocket-sized, while the Los Angeles guide is quite larger as it is meant to be used as a driving/navigational tool in addition to a basic reference. Cities such as Chicago and Washington, DC have a trim size that is in between that of the pocket guides and the larger Los Angeles guide. NFT states that each of its guides' sizes is based solely on the "coverage area" for each city—San Francisco being close to 50 square miles (130 km^{2}), for instance, and Los Angeles covering close to 500 square miles (1,300 km^{2}). Los Angeles has five times the population of San Francisco.

== Content ==
NFT guides are organised by location, breaking cities down into neighbourhoods. The books are divided into maps which are cross-referenced with an appendix listing and briefly reviewing everyday destinations such as supermarkets, gas stations, hardware stores, and mass transit, as well as landmarks, restaurants and hotels.

Recommendations are based on information from residents and details fact-checked. The founders encourage readers to inform them of errors through their website, and this is used to improve future editions.

== Current NFT guides ==
Currently there are 12 titles, including the first ever non-US title, The Not For Tourists Guide to London, which was released in October 2008. The company is currently working on a guide to Paris to be released in 2010.

NFT has released guides to:

- Atlanta
- Boston
- Chicago
- London
- Los Angeles
- Philadelphia
- New York City
  - The New York City borough of Brooklyn
  - The borough of Manhattan
  - The borough of Queens
- San Francisco
- Seattle
- Washington, DC
