= Michou Deli =

Defunct delicatessen in Seattle, Washington, U.S.

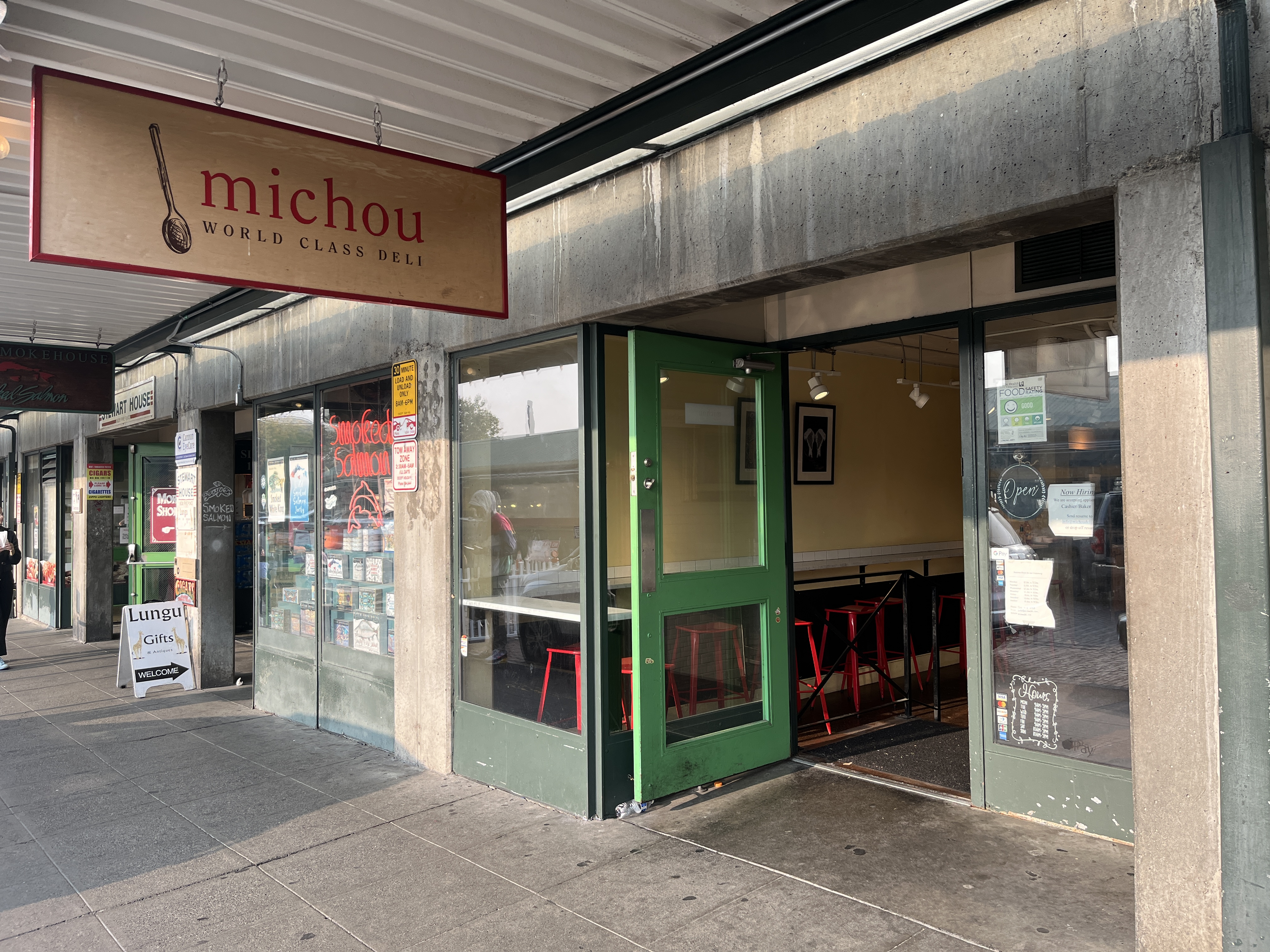
- The delicatessen's exterior, 2022
- Interactive map of Michou Deli

Restaurant information
- Location: 1904 Pike Place, Seattle, King, Washington, 98101, United States
- Coordinates: 47.6099°N 122.3423°W
- Website: michoudeli.com

Michou Deli was a delicatessen at Seattle's Pike Place Market, in the U.S. state of Washington. It operated from 2001 to 2026.

== Description ==
Michou Deli was a delicatessen between Le Panier and Piroshky Piroshky at Pike Place Market in Seattle's Central Waterfront district. The shop sold bambaloni, beets, chicken enchiladas, paninis, pasta salad, orecchiette with pesto, sandwiches, soups, banana cake, and cornflake bars. Sandwiches included the ABBLT (a BLT plus apples and brie), the Tuscan Chicken, and the Sierra with roasted chicken, tomatoes, smoked Gouda cheese, red onion, arugula, and chipotle aioli. In 2018, Seattle Metropolitan said, "Paninis and sides as eclectic as braised red cabbage with apples, arancini, Asian noodle salad, baklava, and kale Caesar salad, all lie arrayed in a long refrigerator case."

== History ==
The deli opened in 2001 and closed in 2026.

== Reception ==
Thrillist says the deli was "revered by locals for its speedy service even during peak lunch hours, and for the affordable price point -- a bargain, considering that everything at Michou is made from scratch with locally-sourced ingredients". The website's Bradley Foster included the roasted chicken sandwich in a 2016 list of "The Absolute Best Seattle Sandwiches for Under $7".

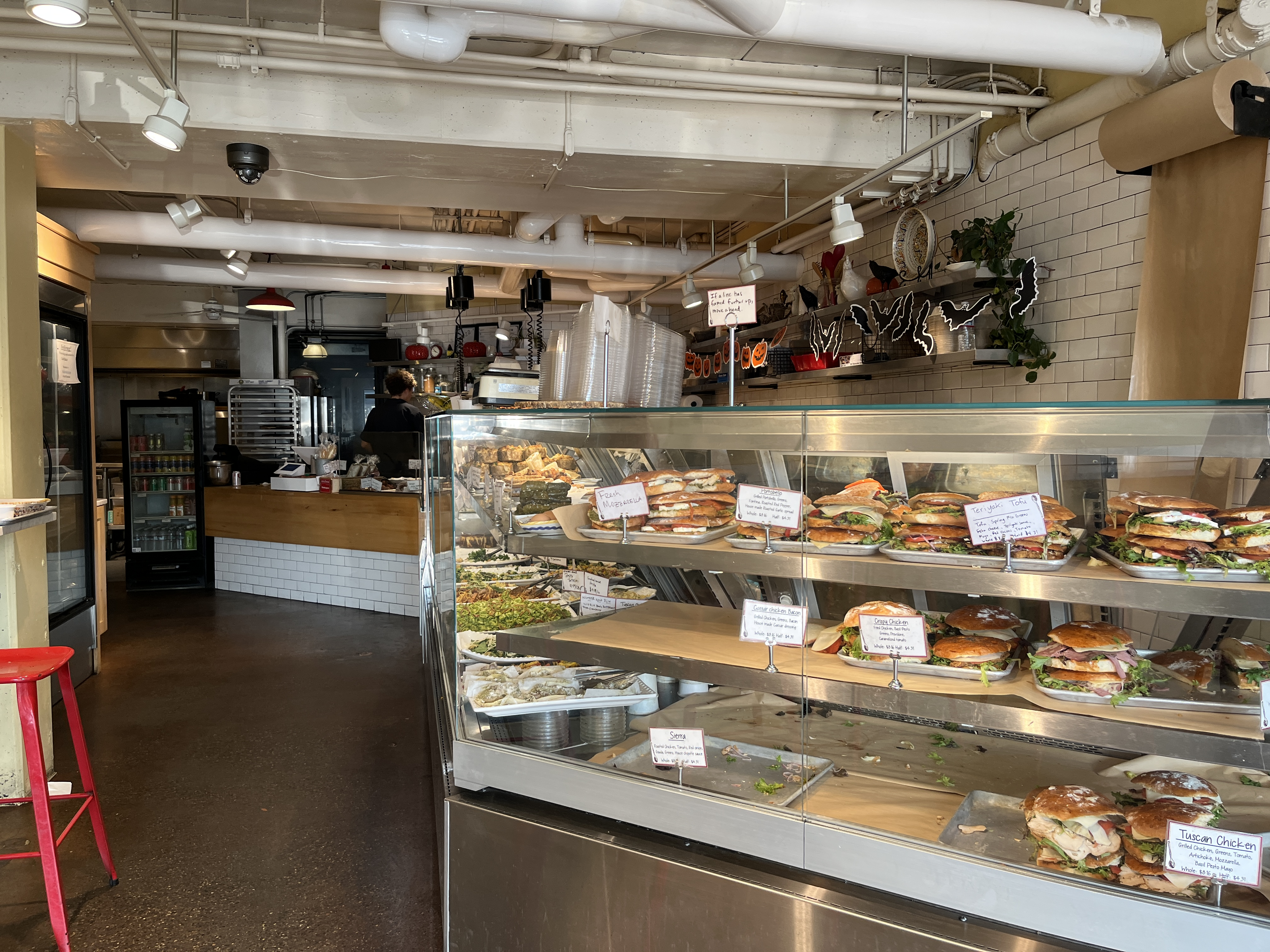
The deli's interior in 2022

Seattle Metropolitan has said: "This case of thoughtful sandwiches (crispy chicken, beef poblano, brie with two types of tomatoes) pressed on order until warm and toasty. Better yet, order just half a sandwich and round out lunch via the endless parade of salads by the pound. A proper meal can run you less than $10, even with dessert." The magazine included Michou in a 2018 list of 14 "classic" restaurants at Pike Place Market and said: "What it can lack in consistency (a lukewarm panini, its cheese merely wilted) Michou Deli makes up in sheer, eclectic breadth... It's not the best food in the market, but at $4 for a satisfying half sandwich, it's some of most accessible."

Sonja Groset included Michou in Eater Seattle's 2015 "guide to the best cheap eats" at Pike Place Market. Christina Ausley included the deli in the Seattle Post-Intelligencer's 2020 list of "8 amazing and hot lunch spots around downtown Seattle for less than $8". Aimee Rizzo included Michou in The Infatuation's 2022 overview of "where to get the best picnic food in Seattle". In the website's "lunch guide" for downtown Seattle, she called the food "excellent" and said Michou offers "some of the best fast-casual lunches in the city". She recommended the paninis, especially those with roasted chicken.

== See also ==
- List of defunct restaurants of the United States
- List of delicatessens
- List of restaurants in Pike Place Market
