= Pike Place Chinese Cuisine =

Restaurant in Seattle, Washington, U.S.

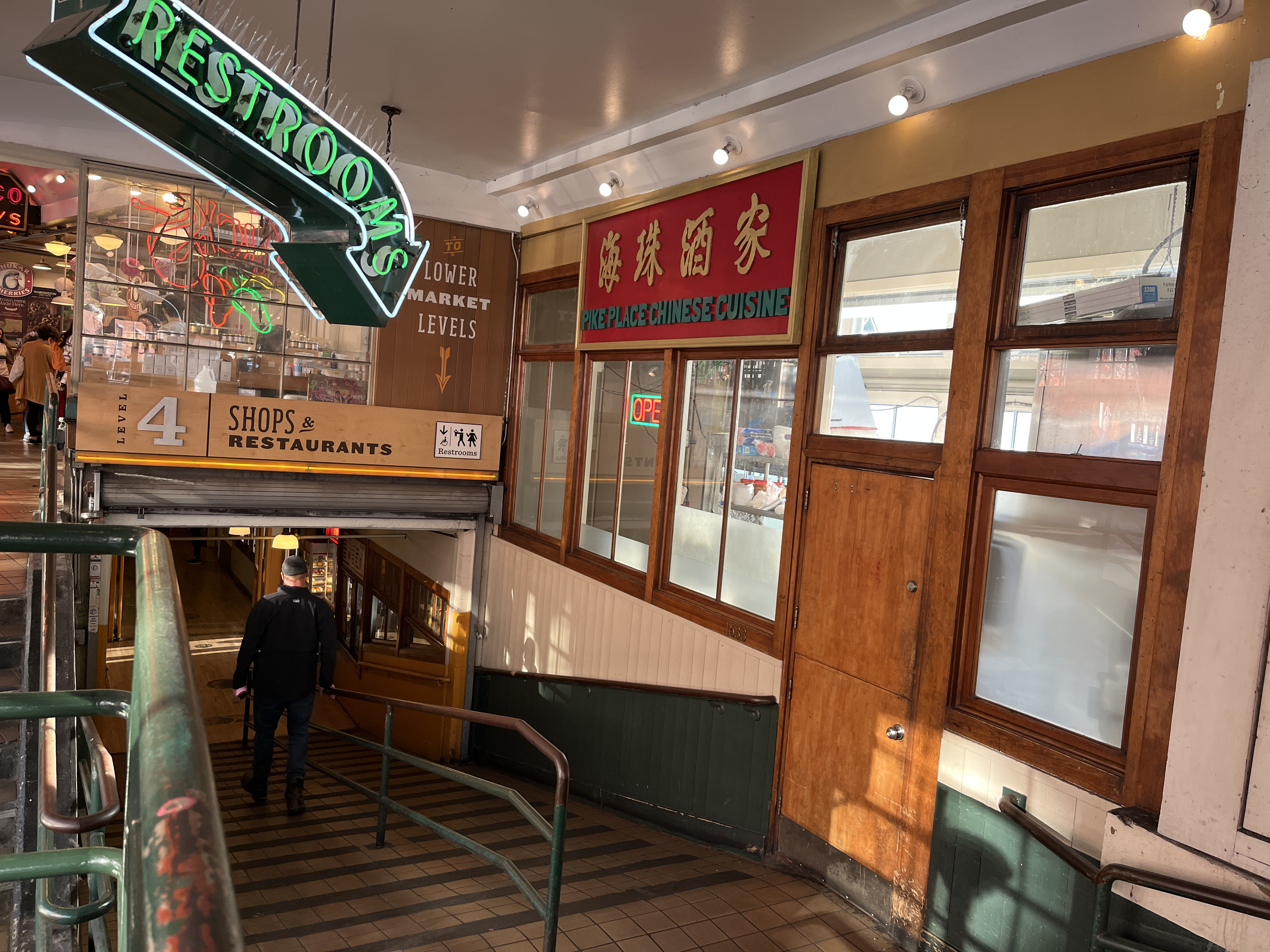
- The restaurant in 2022
- Interactive map of Pike Place Chinese Cuisine

Restaurant information
- Food type: Chinese
- Location: Seattle, King, Washington, United States
- Coordinates: 47°36′33″N 122°20′30″W

Pike Place Chinese Cuisine (Chinese: 海珠酒家) is a Chinese restaurant at Seattle's Pike Place Market, in the U.S. state of Washington.

== Description ==
The Chinese restaurant Pike Place Chinese Cuisine is located on the mezzanine level (Down Under) of Pike Place Market's Main Arcade, in Seattle's Central Waterfront district. Leslie Kelly of the Seattle Post-Intelligencer has described the restaurant as a "skinny little dining room" with views of Elliott Bay. Similarly, The Seattle Times has said the restaurant is "wedged into a skinny space, with big views of the waterfront".

The menu has included barbecue pork, egg rolls, General Tso's chicken, Mongolian beef, pot stickers, and soup, as well as seafood such as clams, crab, fish, mussels, scallops, and squid. Dishes have included chow mein, prawns and green beans, beef with sugar pea pods, and eggplant in a garlic sauce. Desserts have included mooncakes with nuts or red bean paste as well as almond cookies.

== History ==
Pike Place Chinese Cuisine is owned by Jack and Melissa Fong, who also own Mee Sum Pastry at Pike Place Market.

== Reception ==
Christopher Reynolds of the Los Angeles Times has recommended the "tiny" restaurant "for Chinese food in a tight space with a big view". In 2011, Leslie Kelly of the Seattle Post-Intelligencer wrote, "I probably had walked past Pike Place Chinese Cuisine hundreds of times before my daughter suggested we go in and try it. Now it's one of our favorite lunch spots in the Market." She recommended the prawns and green beans and said the restaurant "has a chopstick-dropping view of Elliott Bay, but it's also fun to watch the parade of marketgoers wander by this full-service venue -- cacophony muted behind the windows that face all that action". In his 2012 book Pike Place Market Recipes, Jess Thomson said the restaurant offers "fantastic fare with an astounding view of the Sound".

== See also ==
- List of Chinese restaurants
- List of restaurants in Pike Place Market
