= List of restaurants in Pike Place Market =

Following is a list of notable restaurants that have operated in Pike Place Market, in Seattle, Washington:

List of restaurants in Pike Place Market
Name	Lifespan	Food type	Image
Athenian Seafood Restaurant and Bar	1909–present	Seafood	
Bavarian Meats	1961–2020	German	
Beecher's Handmade Cheese	2003–present		
Biscuit Bitch		Cajun, Southern	
Cafe Campagne		French	
The Confectional			
Cinnamon Works			
Copacabana Restaurant		Bolivian	
Country Dough	2015–2021	Chinese	
The Crumpet Shop	1976–present		
Daily Dozen Doughnut Company	1978–present		
El Borracho		Mexican	
Emmett Watson's Oyster Bar	1979–present	Seafood	
Ghost Alley Espresso			
Hellenika Cultured Creamery			
Jack's Fish Spot			
Le Panier	1983		
Le Pichet		French	
Maíz		Mexican	
Manning's Cafeterias			
Market Grill			
Matt's in the Market			
Mee Sum Pastry		Chinese	
Michou Deli			
Mr. D's Greek Delicacies		Greek	
Oriental Mart		Filipino	
Original Starbucks			
Pike Place Bakery			
Pike Place Chinese Cuisine		Chinese	
Pike Place Chowder			
The Pink Door		Italian	
Piroshky Piroshky		Eastern European, Russian	
Rachel's Ginger Beer			
Radiator Whiskey		American	
Shug's Soda Fountain and Ice Cream	2016–present		
Storyville Coffee			
Sushi Kashiba		Japanese	
Three Girls Bakery			
Turkish Delight		Turkish	
Uli's Famous Sausage			
Virginia Inn	1903–present		
Zig Zag Café			

== See also ==
- List of restaurants in Seattle
