= Hellenika Cultured Creamery =

Gelato company based in Seattle, Washington, U.S.

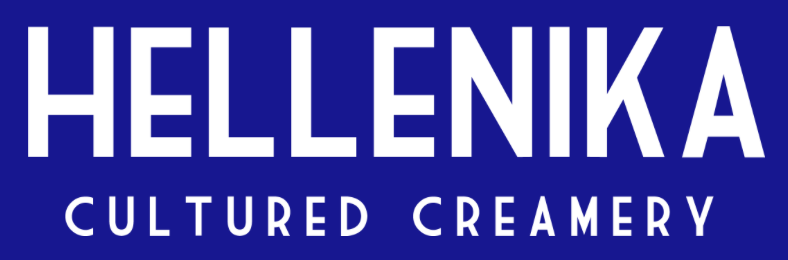

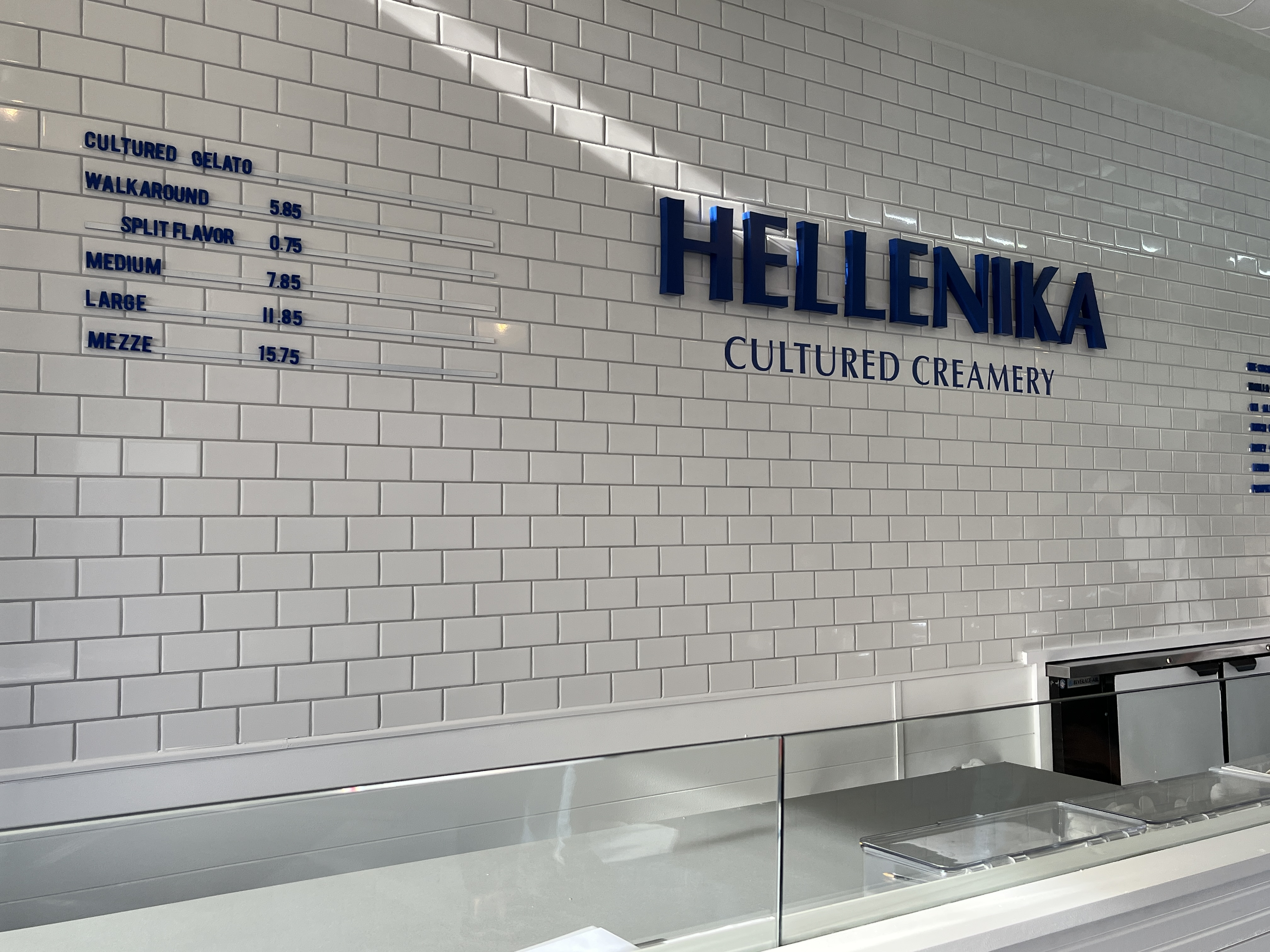
- The shop's interior in 2023
- Interactive map of Hellenika Cultured Creamery

Restaurant information
- Established: 2023
- Owners: Alex Apostolopoulos; Connie Apostolopoulos; Pete Apostolopoulos
- Location: 1920a Pike Place, Seattle, King, Washington, 98101, United States
- Coordinates: 47.6102°N 122.3428°W
- Website: hellenika.us

Hellenika Cultured Creamery is a cultured gelato company based in Seattle, Washington, United States. The business operates shops at Pike Place Market and in the University District.

== Description ==
In Seattle, Hellenika Cultured Creamery operates at Pike Place Market and in the University District. The Pike Place Market shop offers twelve flavors of cultured gelato. Seating is not available. The interior has blue and white tiles, a stainless steel counter, and a kitchen at the back of the shop. Among gelato flavors are coconut ube, dutch chocolate, fairy bread, honey lavender, honey macadamia, honeydew mint, lemon curd, London fog (made with Earl Grey tea from nearby MarketSpice, marionberry, pistachio, and vanilla malt. According to KING-TV, Hellenika uses cultures that "are more understated than those used in traditional yogurt" so the "tangy taste is less intense and more flavorful".

== History ==
Siblings Alex, Connie, and Pete Apostolopoulos are co-founders of Hellenika, which opened in the space previously occupied by Bavarian Meats in 2023.

== Reception ==
In 2024, Jade Yamazaki Stewart and Harry Cheadle included Hellenika in Eater Seattle's list of fourteen "great" restaurants near Pike Place Market, and Sophie Grossman included the business in an overview of fifteen of the "coolest places" for ice cream and gelato in the city. Aimee Rizzo and Kayla Sager-Riley recommended the coconut ube in The Infatuation's 2024 list of Seattle's best ice cream.

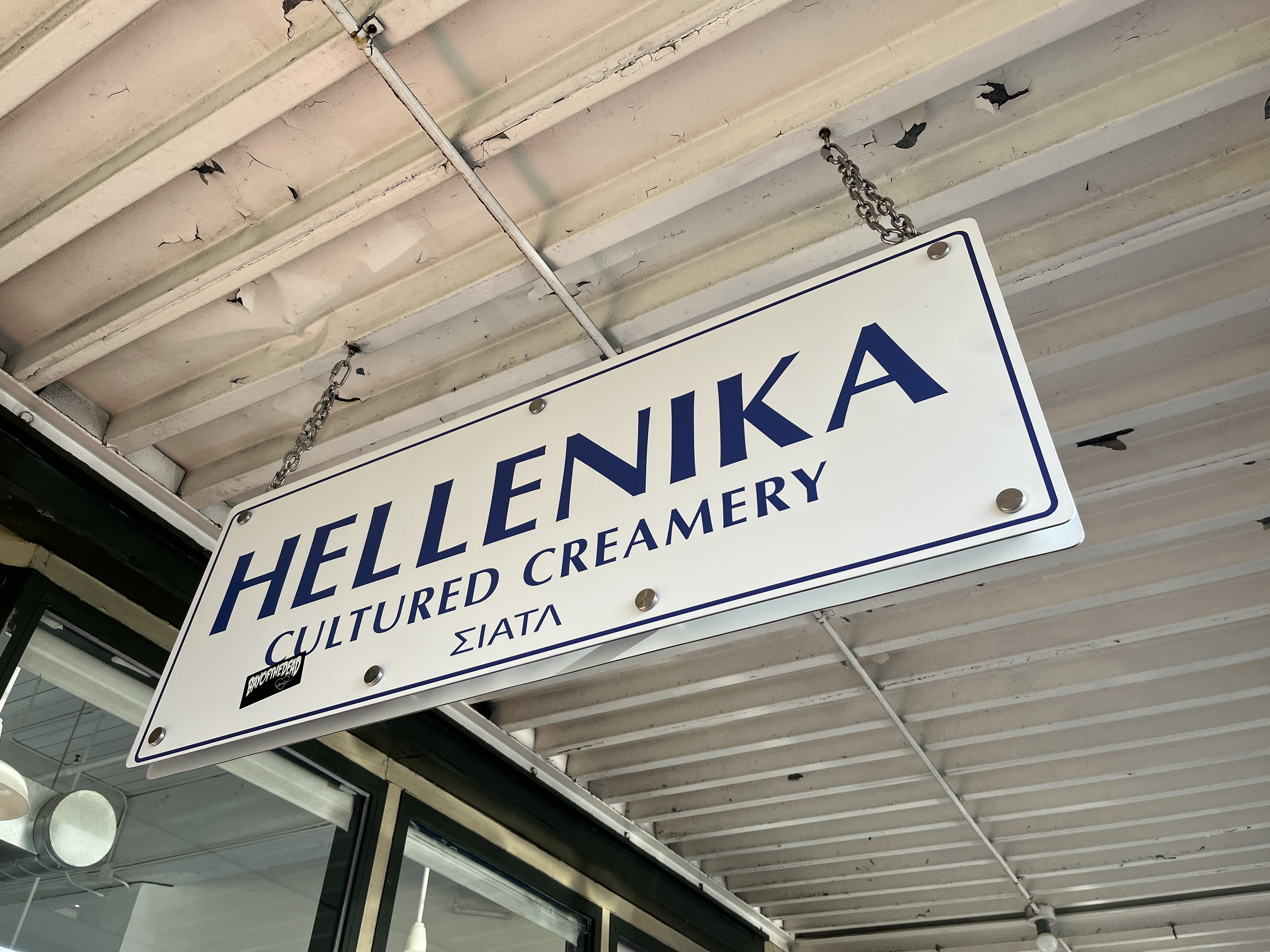

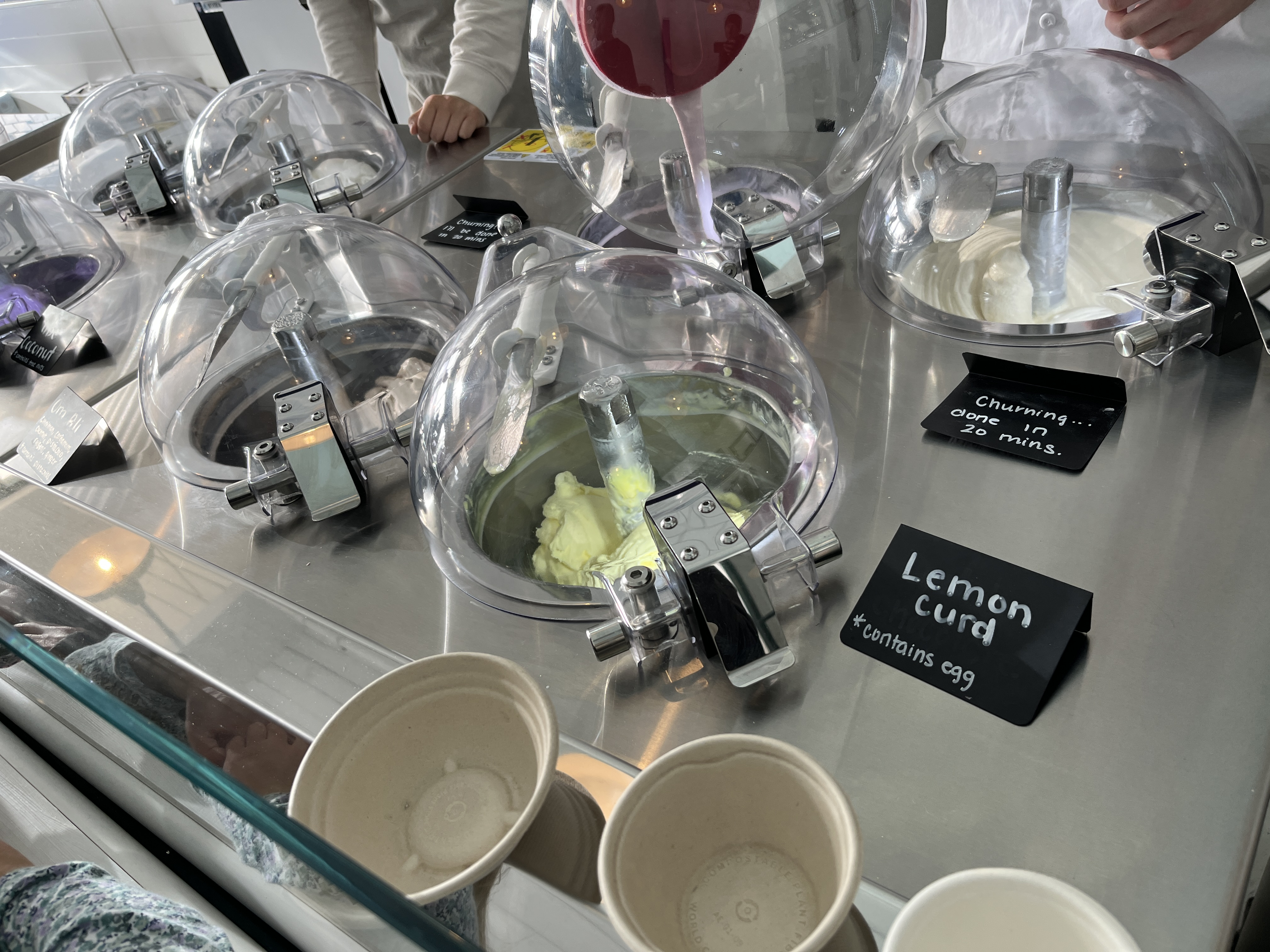

== See also ==
- List of ice cream brands
- List of ice cream parlor chains
- List of restaurants in Pike Place Market
