= Virginia Inn =

Bar and restaurant in Seattle, Washington, U.S.

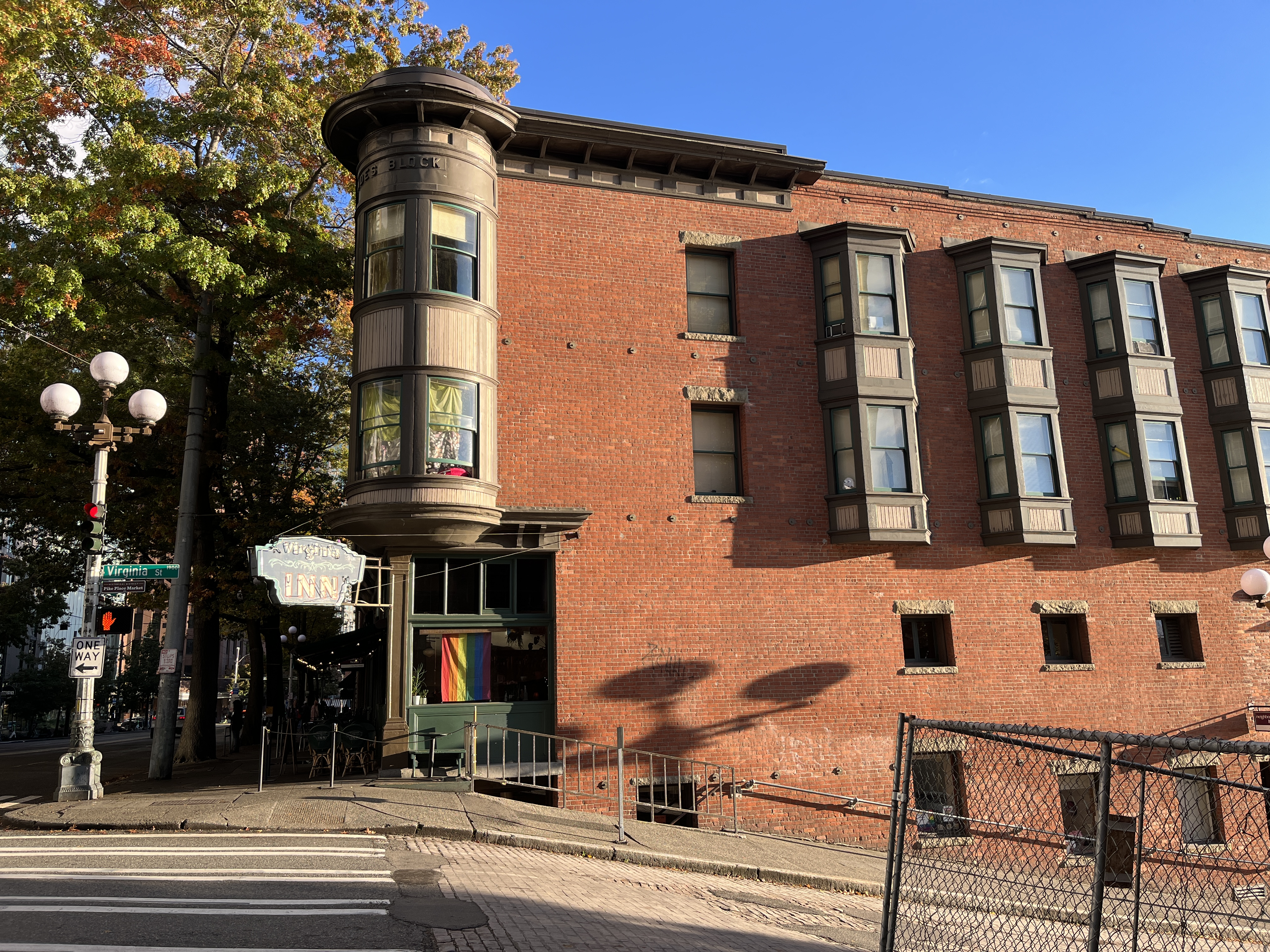
- Exterior, 2022
- Interactive map of Virginia Inn

Restaurant information
- Owners: Karl Sexton and Craig Perez
- Previous owners: Jim Fortheringham and Patrice Demombynes
- Location: 1937 First Avenue, Seattle, Washington, 98101, United States
- Coordinates: 47°36′39.1″N 122°20′33.5″W

Virginia Inn is a bar and restaurant in Seattle, Washington's Pike Place Market. Located in the Hotel Livingston, the Inn opened in 1903, four years before the Market. The establishment was a filming location for Sleepless in Seattle and Singles. Virginia Inn was slated to close permanently in April 2025, until a lease issue was resolved.

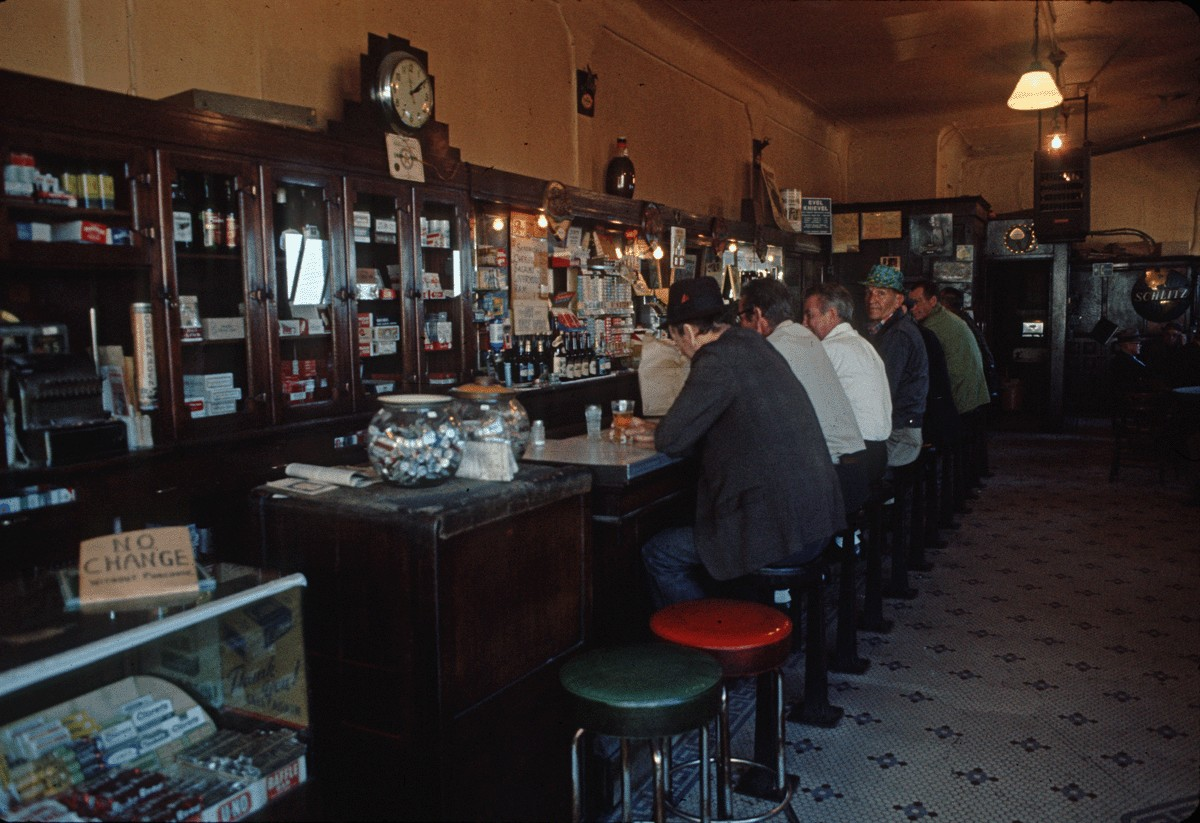
The bar's interior, 1974

== See also ==
- List of restaurants in Pike Place Market
