= El Borracho =

Chain of Mexican restaurants in the U.S. state of Washington

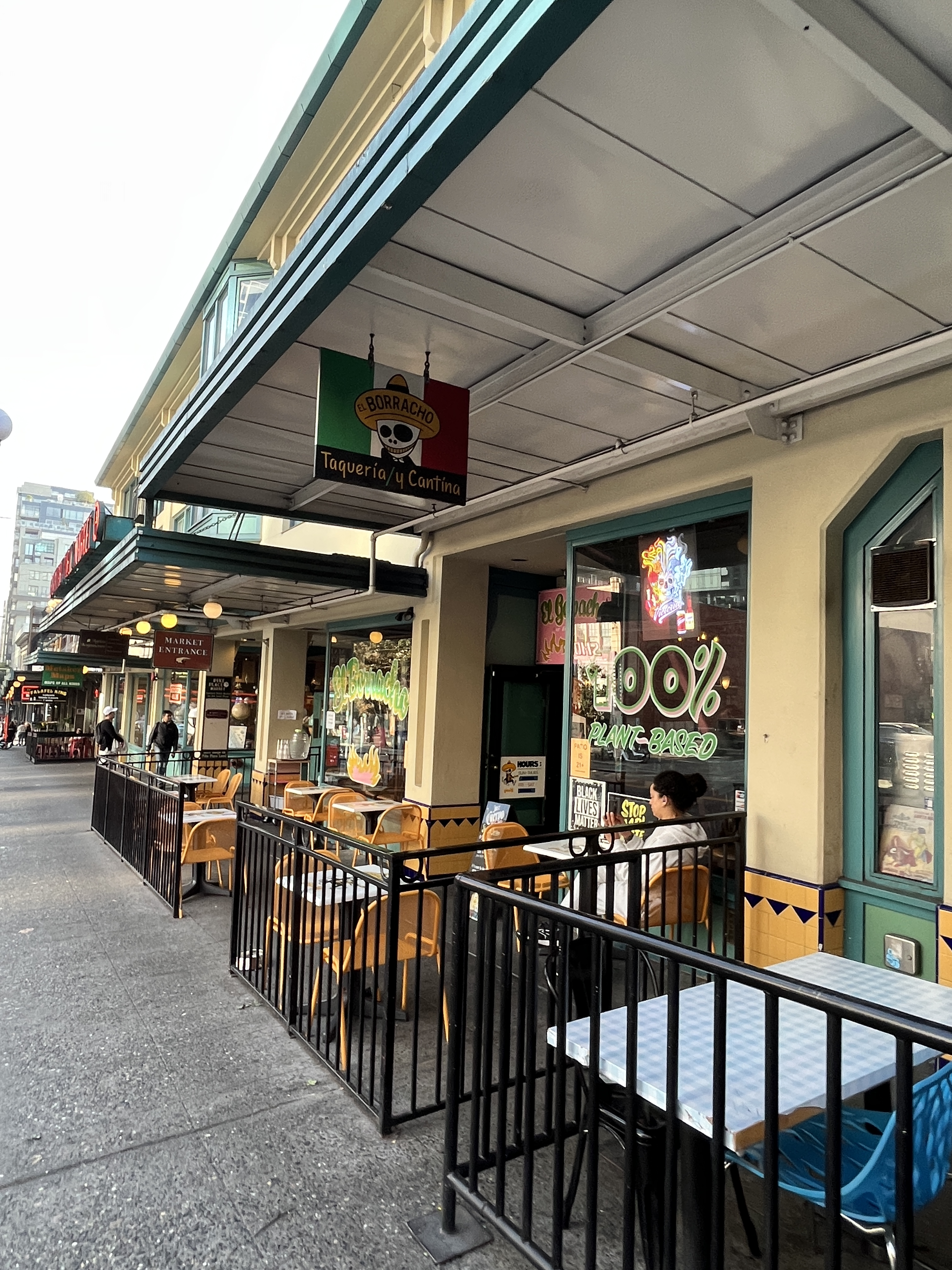
- Exterior of the restaurant at Pike Place Market in Central Waterfront, Seattle, 2022

Restaurant information
- Owner: Kittie Davidovich
- Food type: Mexican
- Location: Seattle, Tacoma, Washington, United States
- Website: elborracho.co

El Borracho is a chain of Mexican restaurants in the U.S. state of Washington. The business operates at Pike Place Market in Central Waterfront, Seattle, and in Tacoma. Previously, El Borracho operated in Seattle's Ballard neighborhood.

== Description ==
The menu has included burritos, burrito bowls, and tacos. When the business converted to a plant-based menu, Impossible Burger and seitan replaced beef and carne asada, respectively. Meat substitutes have also included tofu, "chikin", and "shrymp". Soy- and dairy-free cheeses and dressings are also used.

Thrillist has said, "Hosting a bevy of festive margaritas like its cucumber-honeydew variation, El Borracho takes tacos and other standard Mexican eats to the next level with options like the shredded rabbit in a chipotle tomato stew, and braised beef tongue taco with salsa verde." In addition to the cucumber honeydew flavor, the restaurant has also served coconut, hibiscus, habanero, pineapple-jalapeño, and tamarindo margaritas.

The restaurant has offered discounted tacos and margaritas for happy hour, as well as food and drink specials for Halloween.

== History ==
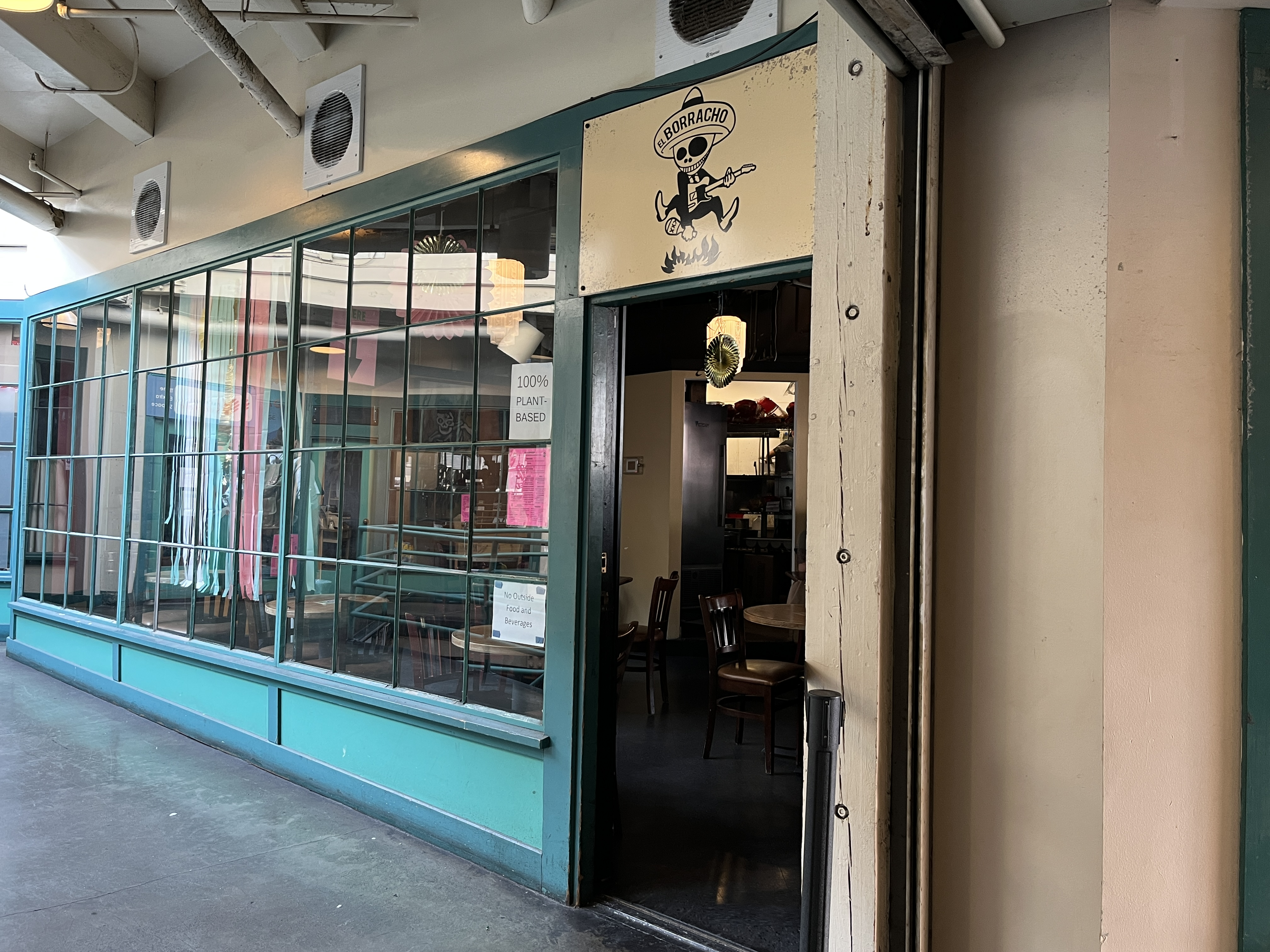
Entryway to the Pike Place Market restaurant, 2022

The restaurant originated at Pike Place Market in Central Waterfront, Seattle. In 2013, owner Kittie Davidovich announced plans to expand to Ballard. The Ballard restaurant opened in February 2014.

Also in 2013, the Pike Place Market restaurant's sign was stolen. In response, Davidovich offered a $100 bar tab and a limousine ride if the sign was returned "without being caught".

All three El Borracho restaurants closed during the COVID-19 pandemic. The Pike Place Market location later operated via curbside patio service in 2021. In mid 2021, all locations implemented a new entirely plant-based menu.

The Ballard restaurant closed in 2022. The business continues to operate at Pike Place Market and in Tacoma.

== Reception ==
Christina Ausley included El Borracho for both Ballard and Downtown in the Seattle Post-Intelligencer's 2020 overview of "every Seattle neighborhood's most popular Mexican restaurant". In 2021, during the COVID-19 pandemic, the newspaper's Callie Craighead included the Ballard restaurant in a "guide to Seattle's most popular Mexican restaurants for dine in, takeout, delivery". Emily Iris Degn included the business in Tasting Table's 2026 list of Seattle's nine best restaurants for tacos.

== See also ==
- List of Mexican restaurants
- List of restaurant chains in the United States
- List of restaurants in Pike Place Market
