= Triangle Building (Seattle) =

Building in Seattle, Washington, U.S.

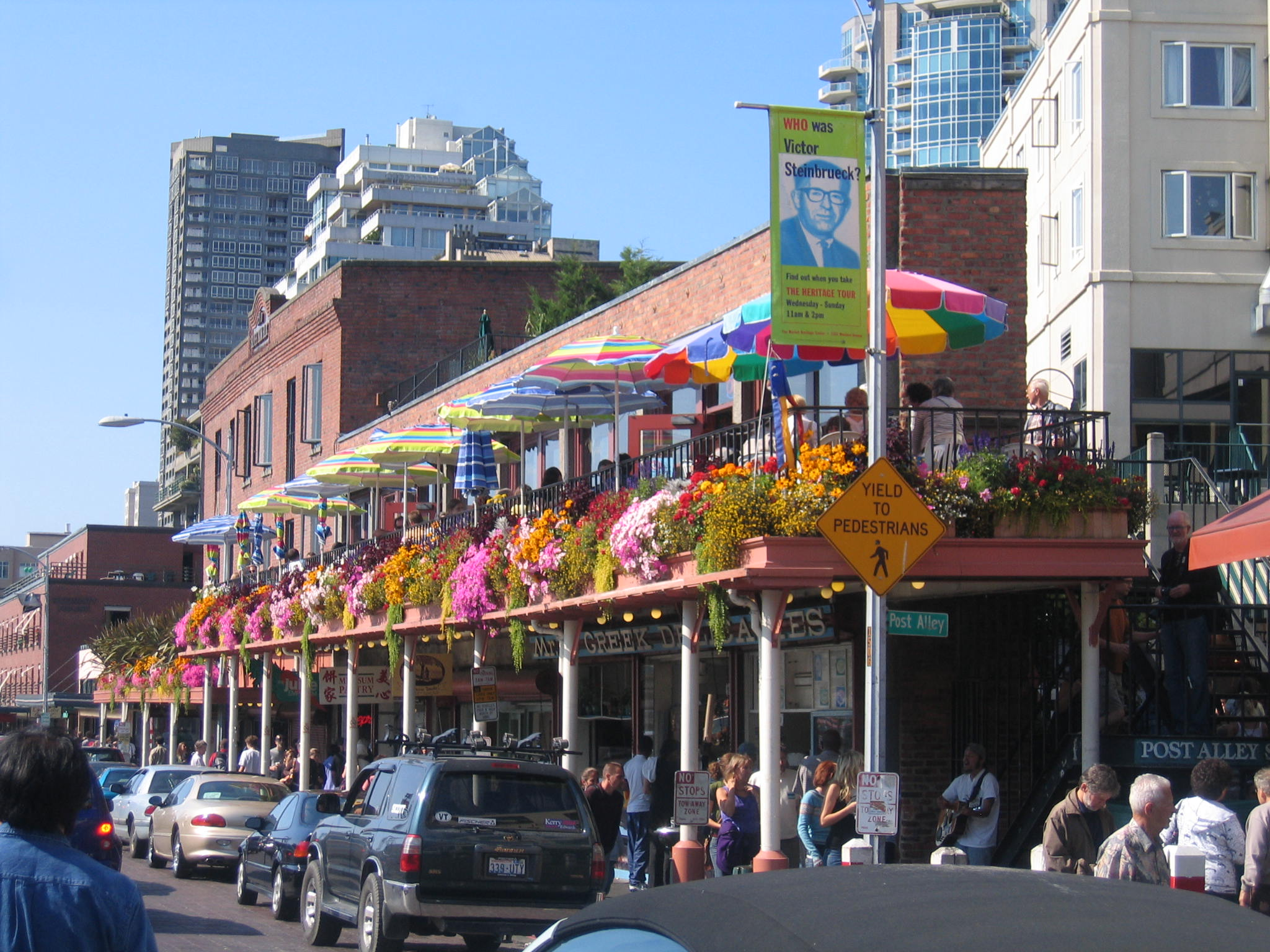
- The building in 2006, with Mr. D's Greek Delicacies downstairs and Copacabana Restaurant upstairs
- Interactive map of the Triangle Building area

General information
- Location: Seattle, Washington, United States
- Coordinates: 47°36′33.4″N 122°20′28.6″W

The Triangle Building (also known as the Triangle Market) is a two-story building in Seattle's Pike Place Market, in the U.S. state of Washington.

Built in 1910, the building was acquired by Market management in 1959 and was joined internally with the adjacent Silver Oakum Building in 1977. The Triangle Building has housed "a creamery, a poultry company, fruit stands, a restaurant, and a billiards hall on the upper floor".

Lonely Planet has said, "All in a row in the diminutive Triangle Building, sandwiched between Pike Place, Pine Street and Post Alley, is a huddle of cheap food take-outs including Mee Sum Pastry (try the steamed pork bun), a juice bar and Cinnamon Works – all great choices for a stand-up snack."

Copacabana Restaurant and Mr. D's Greek Delicacies are housed in the building.
