= Pike Place Bakery =

Bakery in Seattle, Washington, U.S.

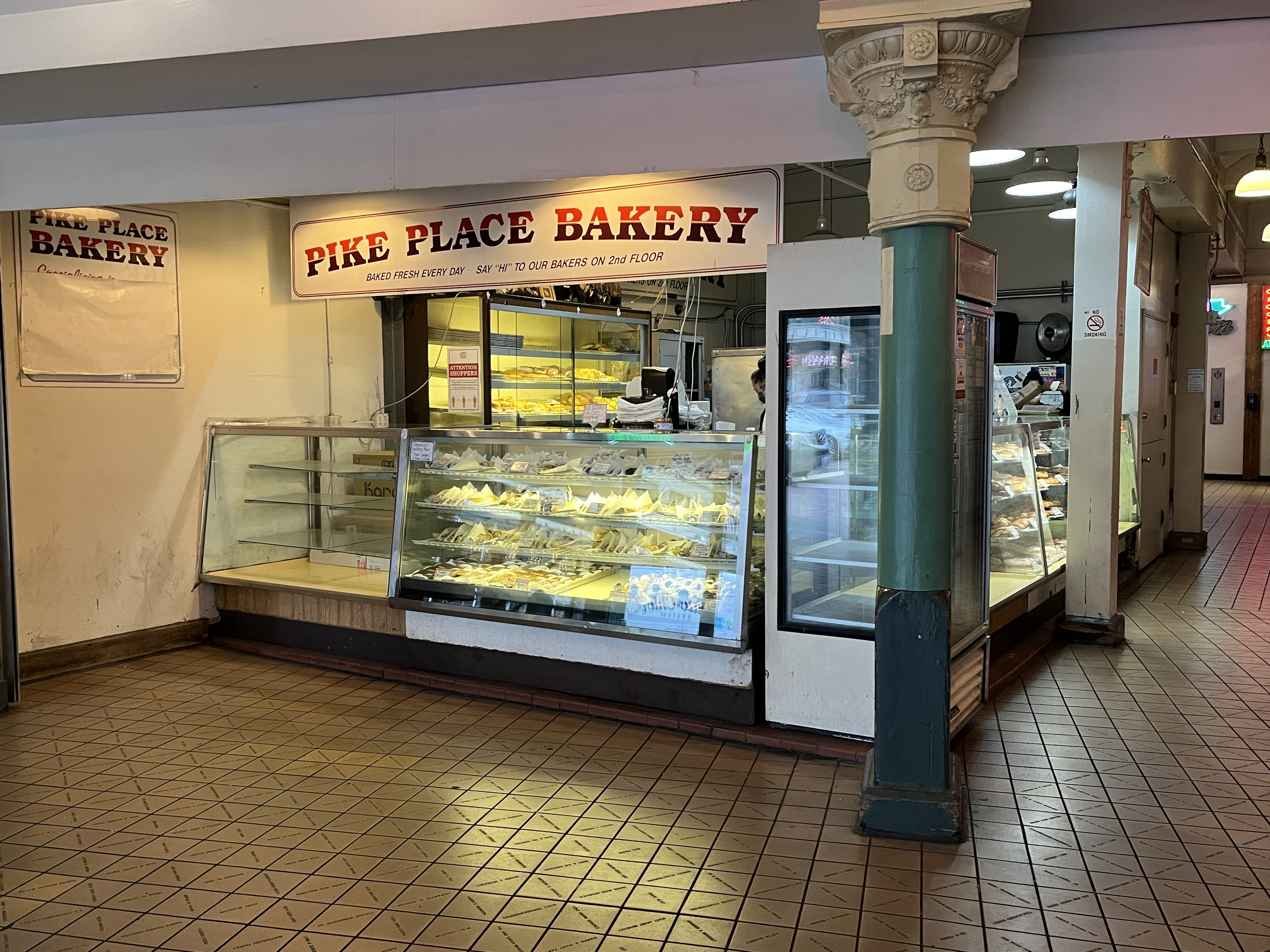
- The bakery in 2022
- Interactive map of Pike Place Bakery

Restaurant information
- Location: Seattle, King, Washington, United States
- Coordinates: 47.6087°N 122.3409°W

Pike Place Bakery is a bakery at Seattle's Pike Place Market, in the U.S. state of Washington.

== Description ==
Located in the Main Arcade, the woman-owned business sells cakes, cinnamon rolls, cookies, croissants, doughnuts, and fritters, among other pastries. The business has been described as the market's "original bakery".

== History ==
Cora Mares purchased and began operating Pike Place Bakery in 1983. Seattle Weekly has said the business "keeps a low profile".

== Reception ==
In 2018, Harrison Jacobs of Business Insider wrote, "The Pike Place Bakery makes some incredible pastries, including local favorites like the maple bar. They've also got some crazy deals if you don't mind eating day-old pastries."

== See also ==
- List of bakeries
- List of restaurants in Pike Place Market
