= Copacabana Restaurant =

Restaurant in Seattle, Washington, U.S.

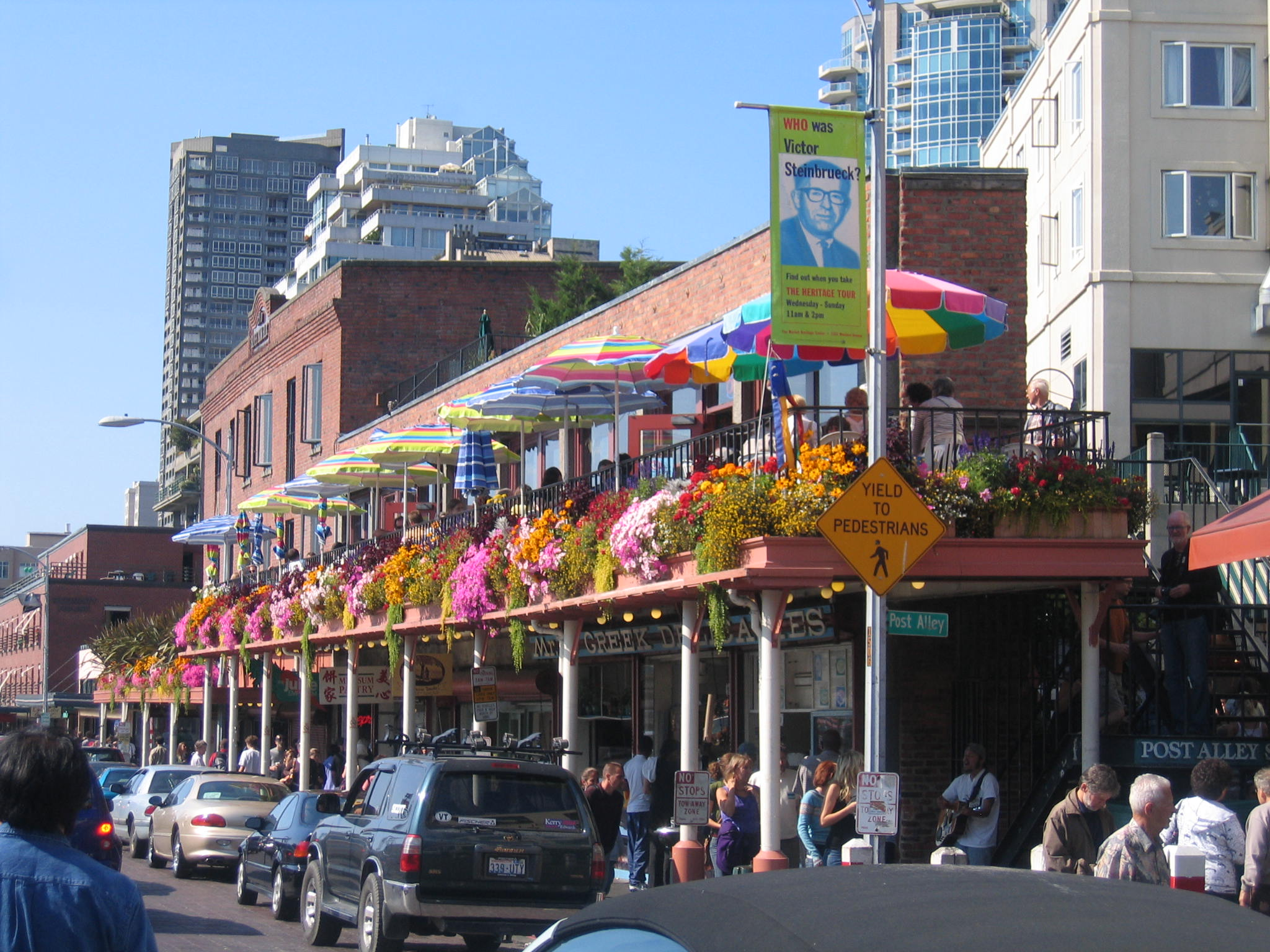
- The restaurant in the Triangle Building, 2006
- Interactive map of Copacabana Restaurant

Restaurant information
- Established: 1964
- Food type: Bolivian
- Location: 1520 1/2 Pike Place, Seattle, King, Washington, 98101, United States
- Coordinates: 47.6093°N 122.3414°W
- Website: pikeplacecopa.com

Copacabana Restaurant (also known as Copacabana Café, or simply Copacabana), is a restaurant at Seattle's Pike Place Market, in the U.S. state of Washington. The business has been described as "one of the oldest Latino restaurants in Seattle", as well as "one of Pike Place's most offbeat eateries".

== Description ==
Copacabana is located in the Triangle Building at Pike Place Market. The restaurant serves Bolivian cuisine and has a patio lined with red chairs. The menu has included paella, pescado a la Espanola, aji de cordero (lamb in spicy peanut sauce), shrimp soup and corn pie, empanadas, pisco sours, wine, a Bolivian Andean beer called Paceña, and a guarana berry soda from the Amazon called Bawls.

== History ==
The business opened in the Sanitary Market in 1964, before relocating to the Triangle Building (1910) in the late 1970s. Copacabana was described as Seattle's only Bolivian restaurant in 1999.

According to Fodor's, "Much of the strategy that preserved Pike Place Market in the 1960s was hatched at this small Bolivian café."

== Reception ==
In Northwest Best Places (1985), David Brewster said "Copacabana is one of the Pike Place Market's best attractions". In 1999, Sunset magazine said the restaurant's deck "gives patrons one of the best market views".

In 2016, Naomi Tomky of Thrillist wrote, "A gem that’s been hiding in plain sight for 50 years, this Bolivian restaurant is a Market treasure that shouldn’t be overlooked." In 2017, the Not for Tourists Guide to Seattle has recommended the deck for people-watching.

== See also ==
- List of restaurants in Pike Place Market
