= Uli's Famous Sausage =

Vendor at Pike Place Market in Seattle, Washington, U.S.

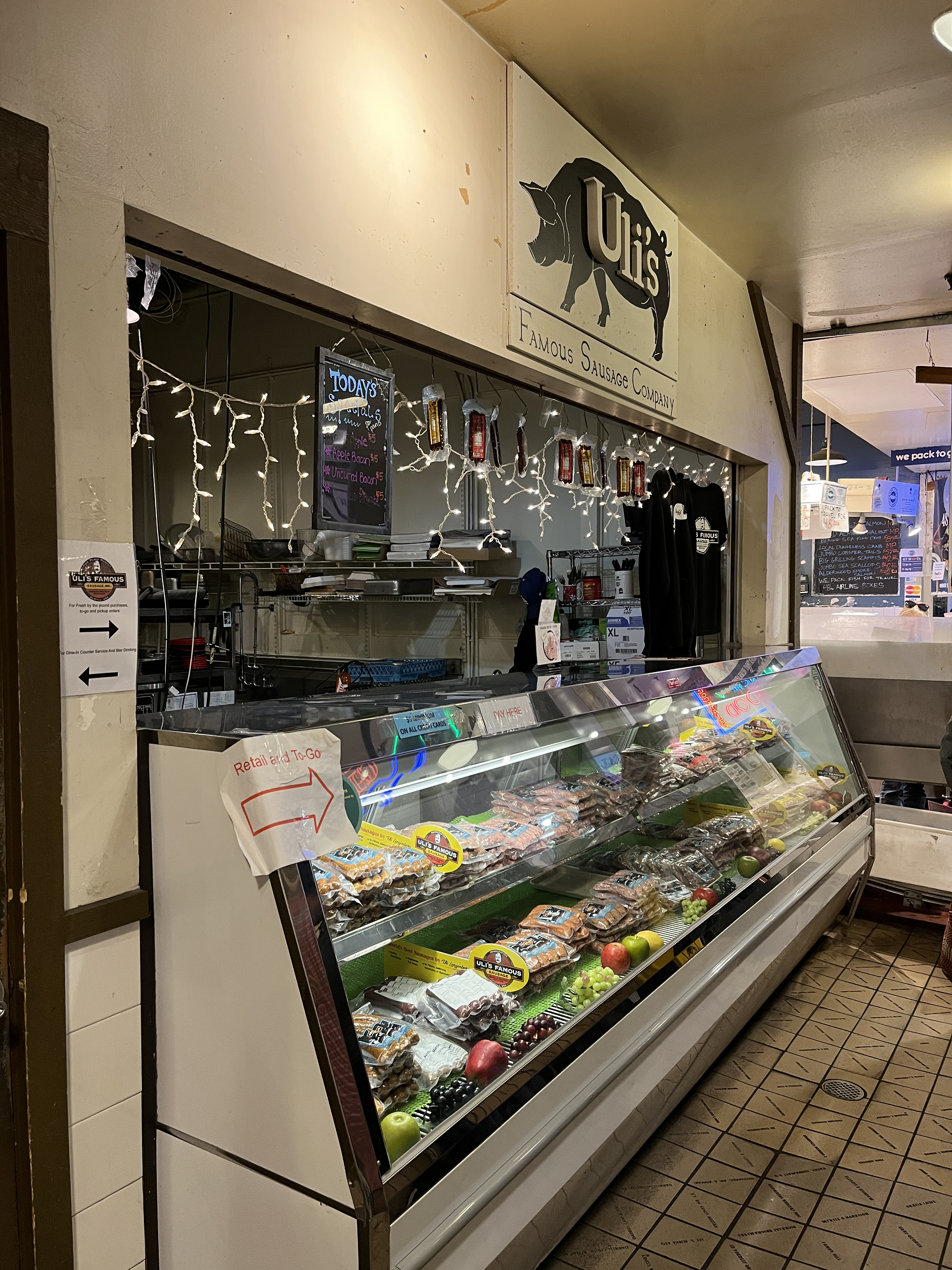
- Interactive map of Uli's Famous Sausage

Restaurant information
- Food type: German
- Location: Seattle, Washington, United States
- Coordinates: 47.5948°N 122.3110°W
- Website: ulisfamoussausage.com

Uli's Famous Sausage is a butcher shop and sausage vendor founded by German master butcher Uli Lengenberg in Seattle, Washington. It is located in the Pike Place Market.

== Description ==
Seattle Metropolitan says, "Really fine chorizo, bratwurst, and other German sausages, in the heart of Pike Place Market. Eat in the indoor beer garden or take it away."

== Reception ==
In Frommer's Seattle (2011), Karl Samson said "sausage lovers should be sure to have at least one sausage sandwich" at Uli's. In 2014 and 2015, the Not for Tourists Guide to Seattle said the business offers Seattle's best sausage. The Seattle Post-Intelligencer included Uli's in lists of "iconic Seattle bites" in 2020 and 2021.

== See also ==
- List of restaurants in Pike Place Market
