= Matt's in the Market =

Restaurant in Seattle, Washington, U.S.

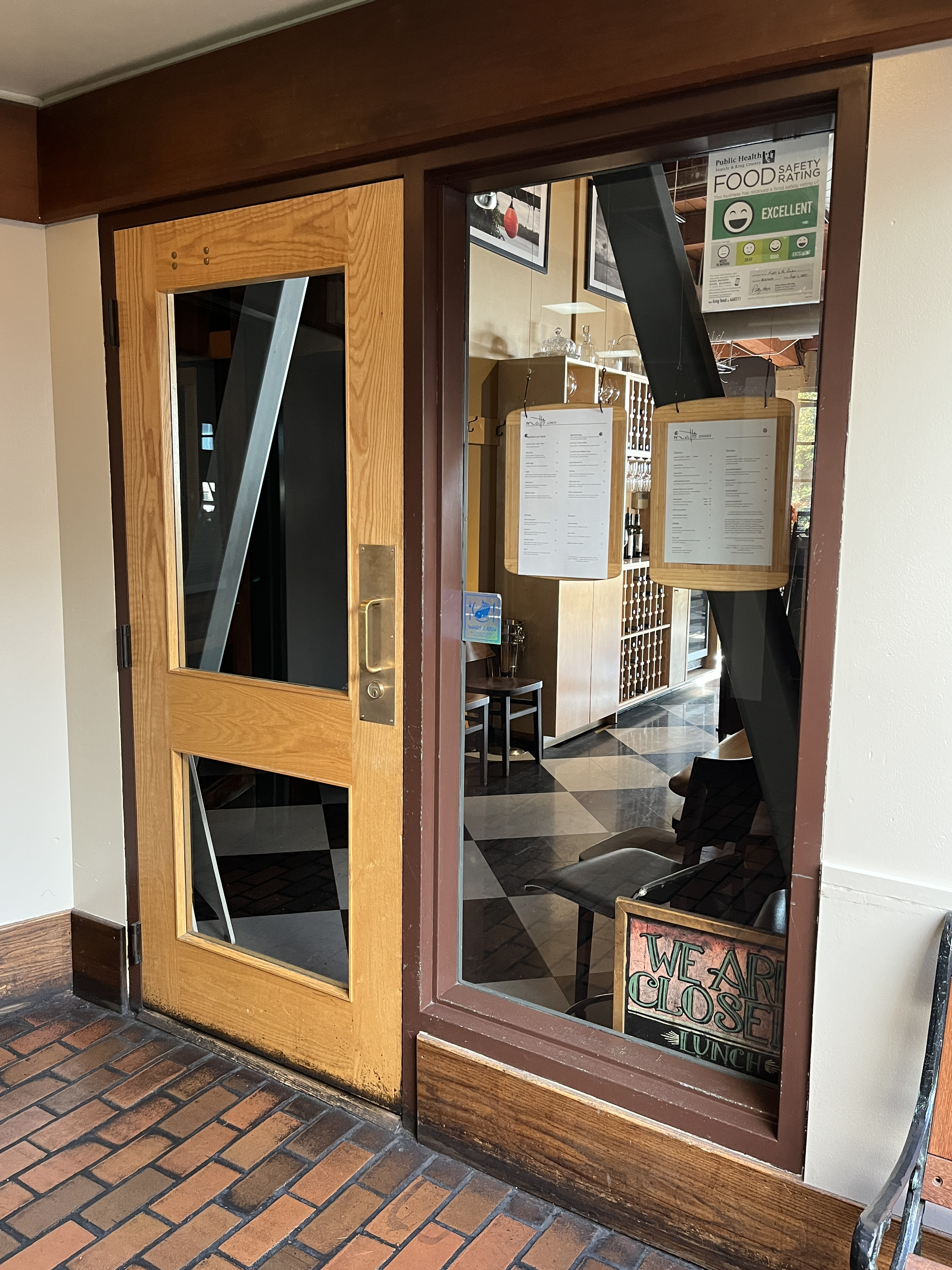
- Restaurant entrance, 2022
- Interactive map of Matt's in the Market

Restaurant information
- Location: 94 Pike Street Suite 32, Seattle, Washington, 98101, United States
- Coordinates: 47°36′32.1″N 122°20′26″W

Matt's in the Market is a restaurant in Seattle's Pike Place Market, in the U.S. state of Washington.

The menu changes based on the season, and has included fish, fresh vegetables and organic meats, seafood paella made with clams, mussels, octopus and prawns, as well as deviled eggs. Nearby Radiator Whiskey has been described as a "sibling" bar.

Dan Bugge is the owner. Matt Fortner replaced Jason McClure as chef in 2018.

== See also ==
- List of restaurants in Pike Place Market
- List of seafood restaurants
