= Shug's Soda Fountain and Ice Cream =

Ice cream parlor in Seattle, Washington, U.S.

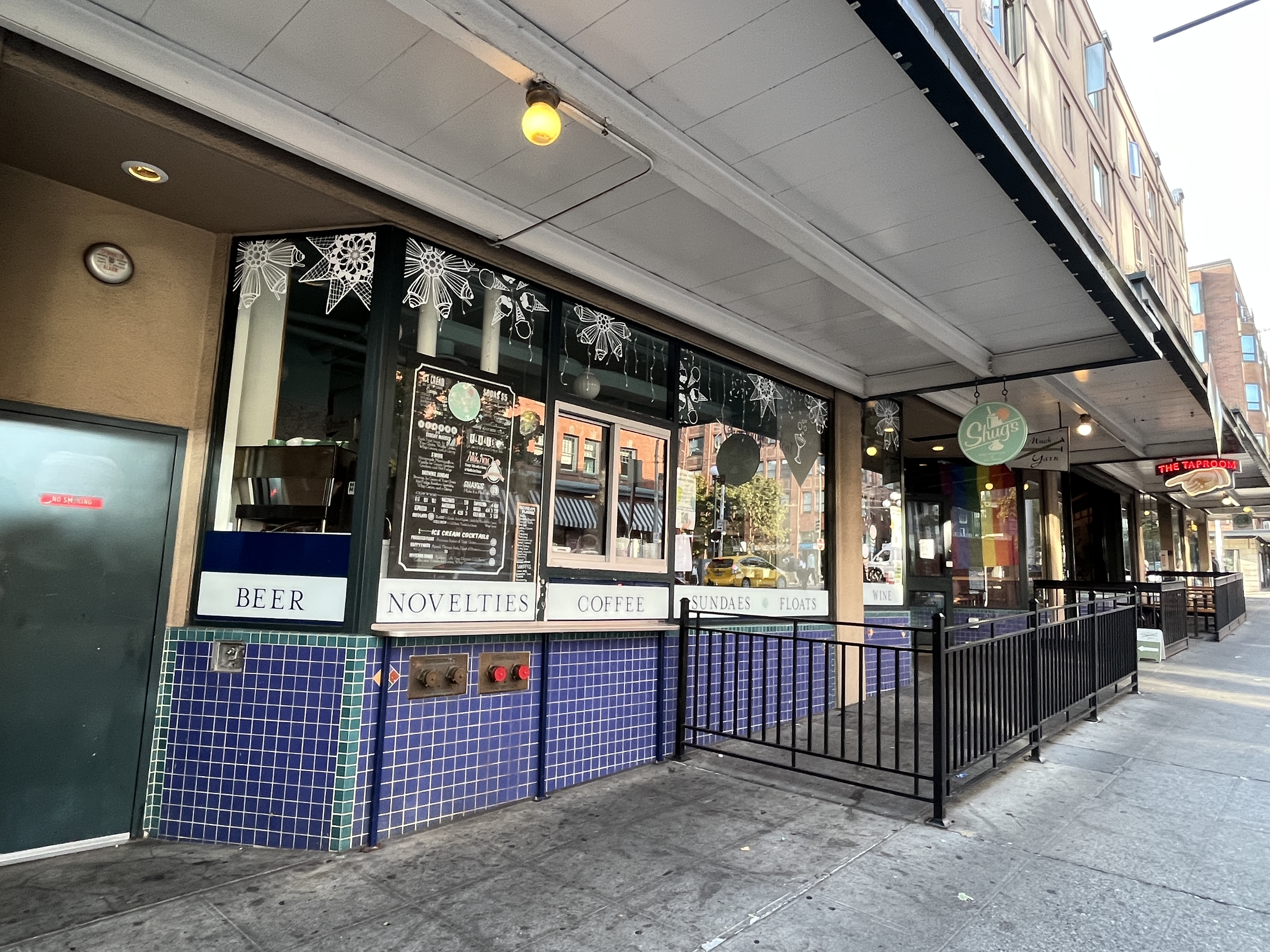
- The restaurant's exterior, 2022
- Interactive map of Shug's Soda Fountain and Ice Cream

Restaurant information
- Owners: Paul Dormann; Colleen Wilkie
- Location: 1525 1st Avenue, Seattle, King, Washington, 98101, United States
- Coordinates: 47.6095°N 122.3409°W
- Website: shugssodafountain.com

Shug's Soda Fountain and Ice Cream is an ice cream parlor at Seattle's Pike Place Market, in the U.S. state of Washington.

== Description ==
Thrillist says, "This cute as a button soda fountain in Pike Place Market leans heavily on its retro charm and 1950s' by way of Pinterest aesthetic from its cheery wallpaper to its cozy counter top seating." The ice cream parlor's menu has included the ice cream floats, hot fudge sundaes, and ice cream cocktails. The Shugsicle, which has orange soda and vanilla ice cream. The business uses housemade syrups.

== History ==
Co-owners Paul Dormann and Colleen Wilkie opened the restaurant in 2016. Shug's Mini was slated to open in West Seattle as of 2019.

== Reception ==
Allecia Vermillion included Shug's in Seattle Metropolitan's 2022 overview of the city's best ice cream. Bradley Foster and Emma Banks included the business in Thrillist's 2022 list of Seattle's 15 best ice cream shops. In 2022, Zuri Anderson of iHeart said Shug's was the best ice cream shop in Washington.

== See also ==
- List of restaurants in Pike Place Market
