= Market Grill =

Restaurant in Seattle, Washington, U.S.

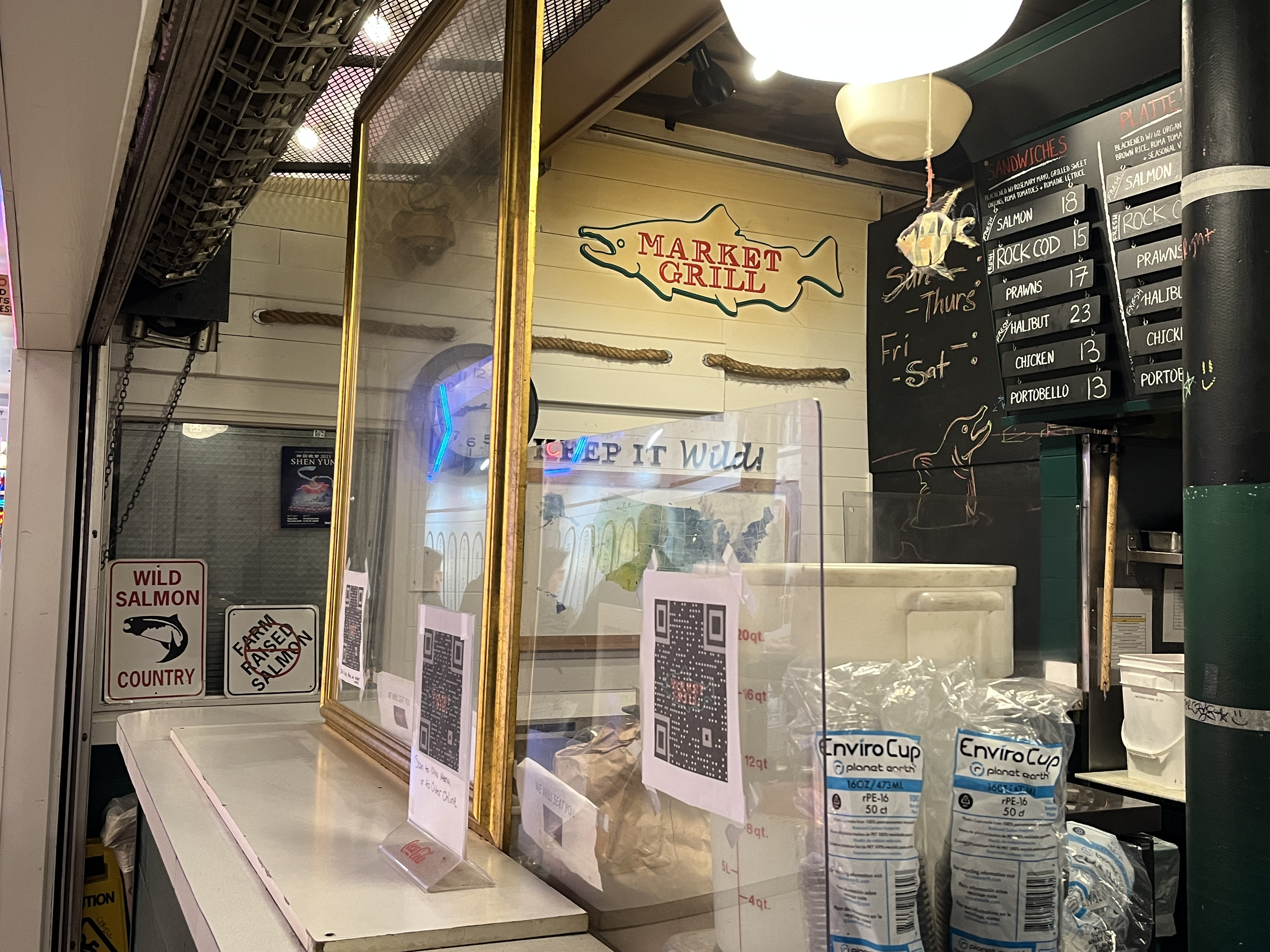
- The counter in 2022
- Interactive map of Market Grill

Restaurant information
- Location: Seattle, King, Washington, United States
- Coordinates: 47.6088°N 122.3410°W

Market Grill is a restaurant at Pike Place Market, in the U.S. state of Washington.

== Description ==
The restaurant Market Grill operates at a counter in the Main Arcade at Pike Place Market. The menu has included fish sandwiches, as well as chowder with clams, potatoes, and dill.

== History ==
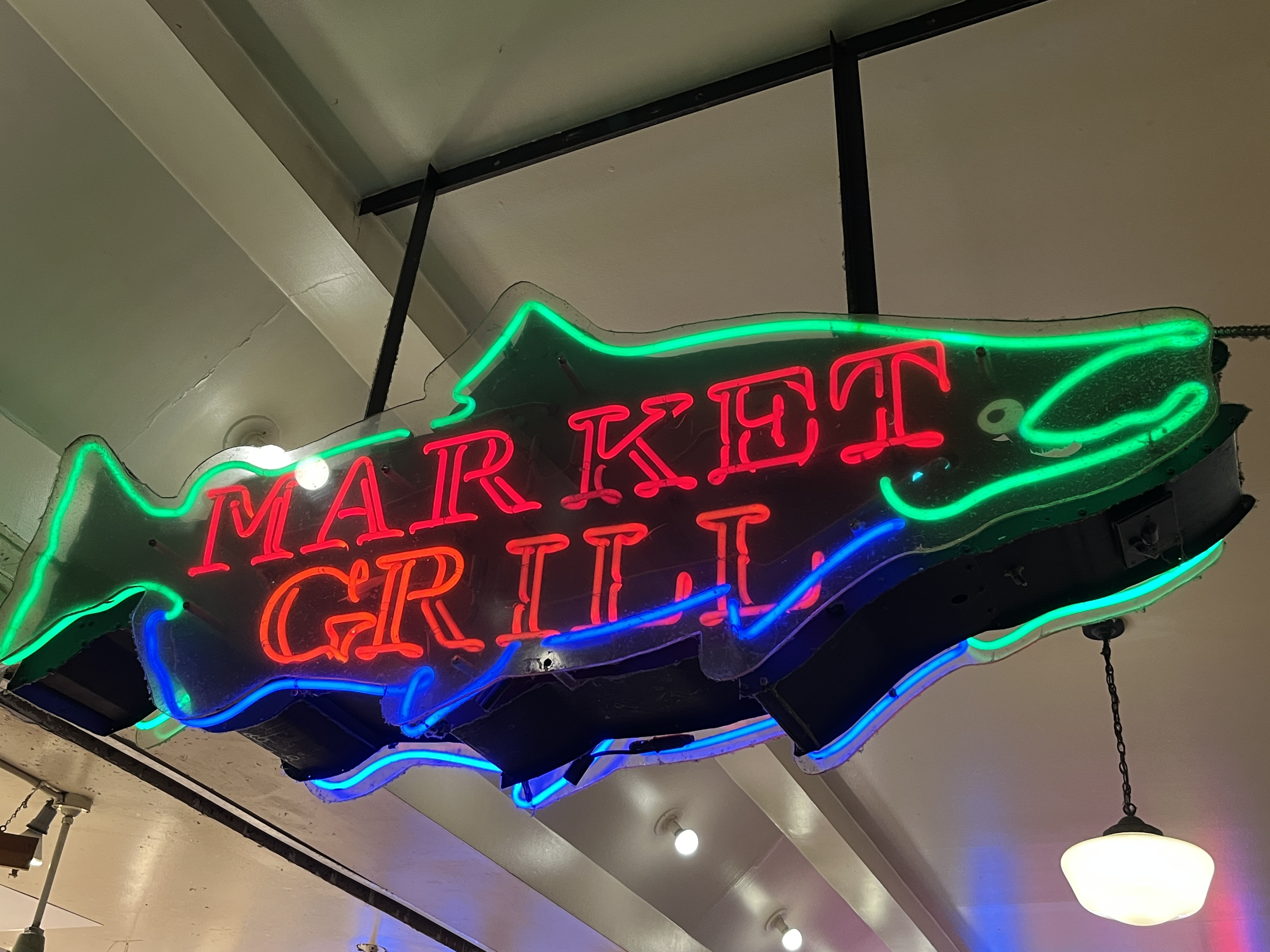
Restaurant sign, 2022

During the COVID-19 pandemic, the restaurant utilized a "pop-up" patio outside the market.

== Reception ==
The 2016 and 2017 editions of the Not for Tourists Guide of Seattle say the chowder and salmon sandwiches are "worth the wait". Naomi Tomky included the halibut sandwich in Thrillist's 2016 list of "The 50 Best Things to Eat and Drink at Pike Place Market". In 2018, Harrison Jacobs of Business Insider said the salmon sandwich has "been voted the best sandwich in the market for many years". In Eater Seattle's 2019 overview of "The Greatest Places to Eat in Seattle's Greatest Tourist Trap", Lesley Balla wrote, "The small counter is a great perch for people-watching. Signage says the sandwiches are TV-famous, and the blackened salmon, cooked medium-rare, slathered with sweet grilled onions and rosemary mayo on a chewy baguette, is fantastic in its simplicity." Seattle Magazine has included the grilled salmon sandwich in an overview of recommended "cheap eats".

== See also ==
- List of restaurants in Pike Place Market
