= Le Pichet =

French restaurant in Seattle, Washington, U.S.

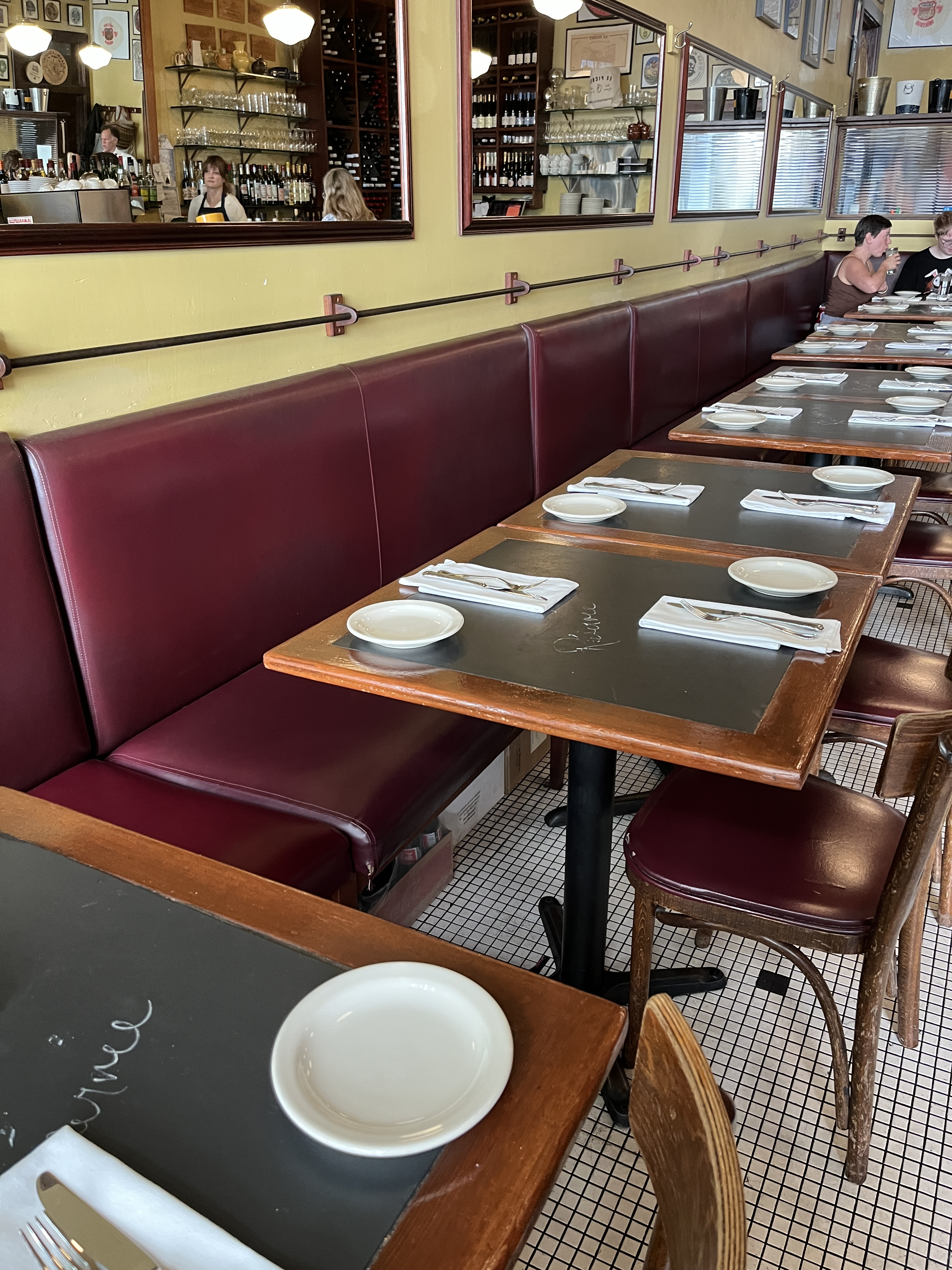
- The restaurant's interior, 2023
- Interactive map of Le Pichet

Restaurant information
- Food type: French
- Location: 1933 1st Avenue, Seattle, King, Washington, 98101, United States
- Coordinates: 47.6108°N 122.3426°W
- Website: lepichetseattle.com

Le Pichet is a French restaurant in Seattle, in the U.S. state of Washington.

== Description ==
Fodor's has described the restaurant's menu as "heartbreakingly" French and said, "Slate tabletops, a tile floor, and a rolled-zinc bar will transport you out of Downtown Seattle and into the charming 6th arrondissement." The menu has included pâtés, ham and cheese sandwiches on baguettes, sausages, fish, steak tartare, and roast chicken.

== History ==
Jim Drohman is the chef as of 2014.

== Reception ==
Thrillist says, "The regional and classic style of French food at this Pike Place restaurant has made it a prominent fixture in the area. With an all day charcuterie menu, wine list, full bar, and diner menu there is always something worth stopping in to try." In 2018, Aimee Rizzo of The Infatuation said, "Le Pichet is one of our favorite places for French food." In 2018, Time Out said:

Francophiles are going feel right at home at Le Pichet. Another Seattle institution, the eatery's menu is almost entirely in French. Don't fret, though: No matter what you order, you're sure to end up with something fantastically delicious. Pro tip: You might want to consult Google to make sure you're actually ordering the always great charcuterie plate.

In 2022, The Seattle Times said, "Over the years, [Anthony] Bourdain often gave Le Pichet or Café Presse a shoutout when he visited Seattle."

== See also ==
- List of French restaurants
- List of restaurants in Pike Place Market
