= Maíz (restaurant) =

Mexican restaurant in Seattle, Washington, U.S.

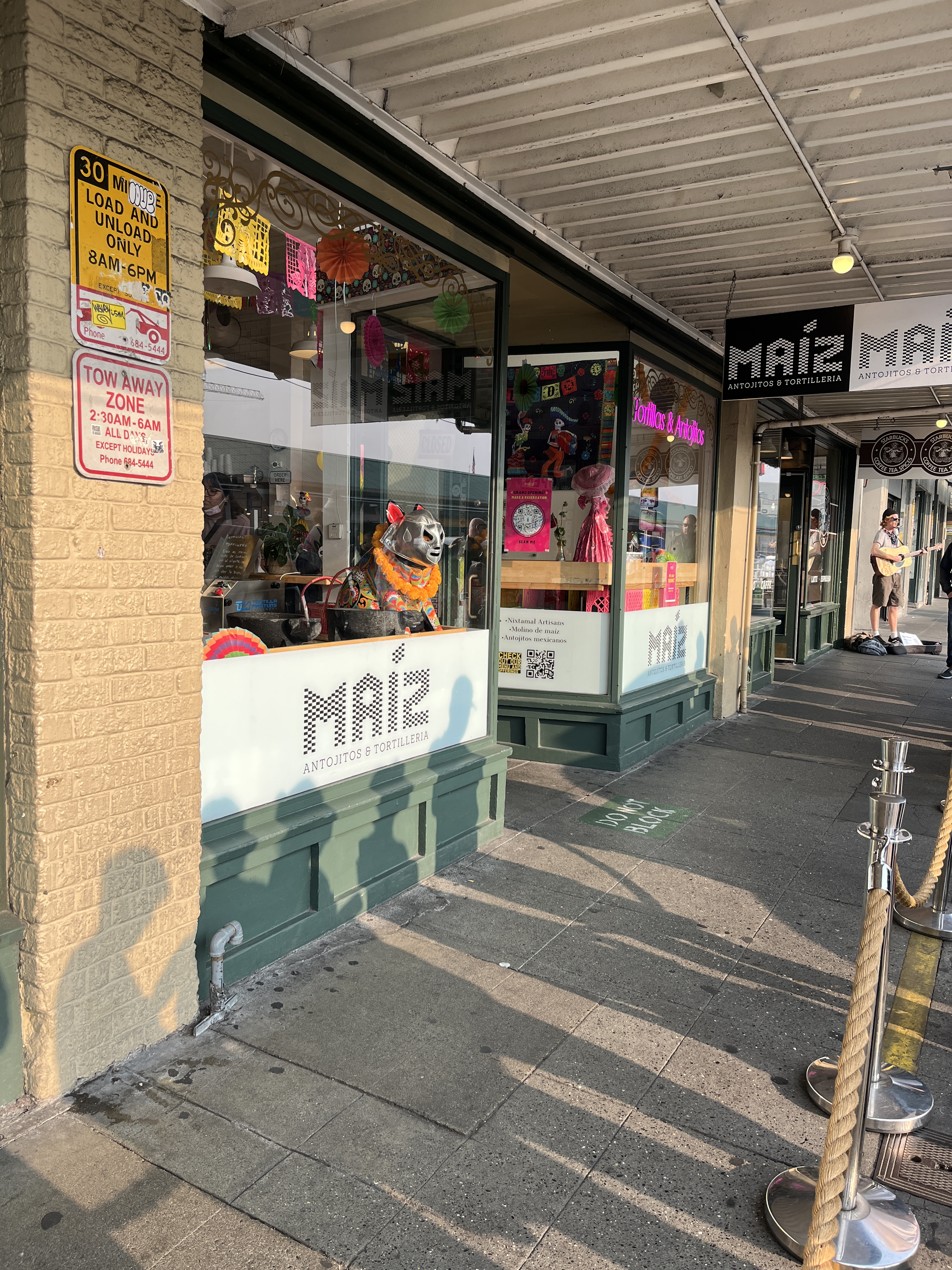
- The restaurant's exterior, 2022
- Interactive map of Maíz

Restaurant information
- Food type: Mexican
- Location: Seattle, Washington, United States
- Coordinates: 47.6101°N 122.3425°W

Maíz is a small chain of Mexican restaurants in Seattle, Washington. The original nixtamaleria has operated at Pike Place Market since 2021. Maíz Molino opened in Denny Triangle in 2022, and Maíz Taqueria opened in the Ballard area in 2024. The latter has since closed permanently.

== Description ==
Maíz is a small chain of Mexican restaurants in Seattle. In addition to the original restaurant at Pike Place Market, outposts operates in the Denny Triangle and Ballard areas.

=== Maíz at Pike Place Market ===
The Pike Place Market location's interior features white tile walls, mosaics of corn and the restaurant's name, and talavera tiles depicting skeletons bathing, riding motorcycles, texting, and doing yoga. Naomi Tomky of the Seattle Post-Intelligencer said the shop is "a modern feeling space that celebrates an ancient tradition". The interior also has four stools for indoor dining.

The menu includes nixtamal tortillas and antojitos (Mexican street food) such as chalupas, gorditas, huaraches, quesadillas, sopes, guisado-style tacos, tamales, tlacoyos, and tostadas. The restaurant has also served chilaquiles, pan dulce, champurrado, horchata lattes, and other Mexican-style coffee drinks. In addition to chilaquiles, the breakfast menu was expanded in August 2022 to include egg tacos and fruit with chamoy and Tajín.

=== Maíz Molino and Maíz Taqueria ===
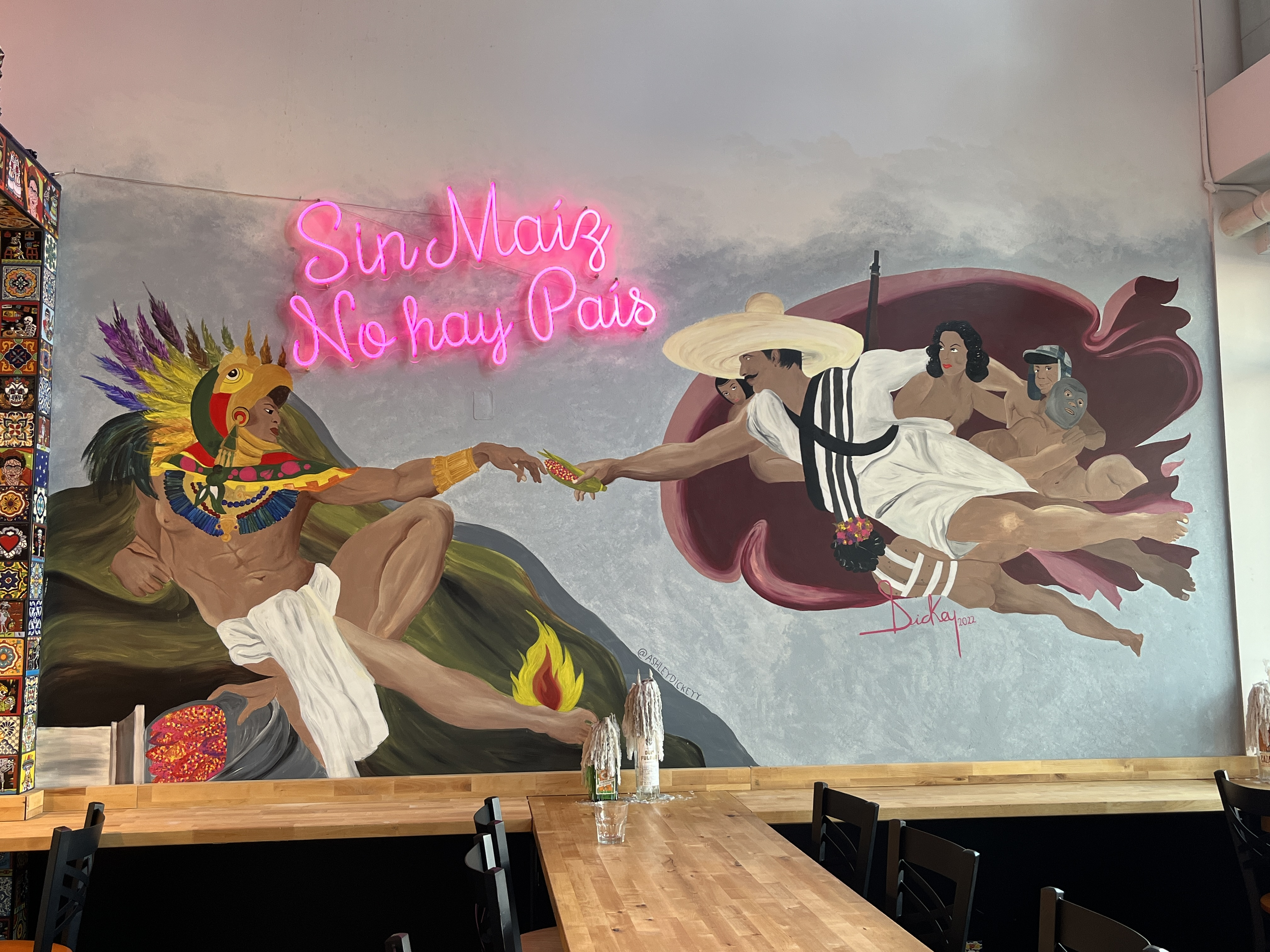
Interior mural at Maíz Molino, 2023

Maíz Molino's interior features a sign with text which translates to "Without corn, there is no country". The menu has included pork cheeks in mole, short ribs with masa grits, and snake venom–infused sotol.

Maíz Taqueria operated on 15th Avenue Northwest. The menu included nachos and tacos.

== History ==
Aldo Góngora, his wife Angelica Martin, and her sister Roxana Martin opened the original brick and mortar restaurant in a former Mexican grocery store on November 2, 2021, with a ribbon cutting ceremony and Day of the Dead celebration featuring a live mariachi band. The tortilla shop is the second in Seattle nixtamalizing its own corn, following Milpa Masa.

"Sibling" restaurant Maíz Molino opened in Denny Triangle in 2022.

In February 2024, Maíz Taqueria in the space previously occupied by Sazon Kitchen. The location has since closed permanently.

== Reception ==
In 2022, Allecia Vermillion included Maíz in Seattle Metropolitan's list of best new restaurants. She also included the business in a 2022 overview of "Seattle's great tacos and Mexican restaurants". Megan Hill, Jade Yamazaki Stewart, and Harry Cheadle included Maíz Molino in Eater Seattle's 2023 list of 16 "marvelous" Mexican restaurants in Seattle metropolitan area.

== See also ==
- List of Mexican restaurants
- List of restaurant chains in the United States
- List of restaurants in Pike Place Market
