= Bavarian Meats =

Meat producer in Seattle, Washington, U.S.

Coordinates: 47.6102°N 122.3428°W

- Industry: Food manufacturing
- Founded: 1961 in Seattle, Washington
- Founder: Max Hofstatter
- Headquarters: Seattle, Washington
- Products: Meat products
- Website: https://bavarianmeats.com/

Bavarian Meats is an American meat producer and processing company based in Seattle, Washington. The company supplies meats to various delicatessens and grocery stores in the Pacific Northwest. From 1961 to 2020, Bavarian Meats operated a delicatessen of their own in Downtown Seattle, including a space at Pike Place Market which closed in 2021 due to the pandemic.

== Locations ==
Bavarian Meats is a wholesale supplier of meat products for delicatessens in the Pacific Northwest. The company also produced packaged meats for sale at grocery stores in the Pacific Northwest. Bavarian Meats also has stands at several Seattle-area stadiums, including T-Mobile Park, where they offer the "Mariner Dog", Lumen Field, and Climate Pledge Arena. Since 2021, the company has sponsored the Seattle Kraken of the National Hockey League; the team's logo is featured on packaging for Bavarian Meats' "Seattle-style sausage".

Bavarian Meats are sold in Costco locations.

=== Seattle delicatessen ===
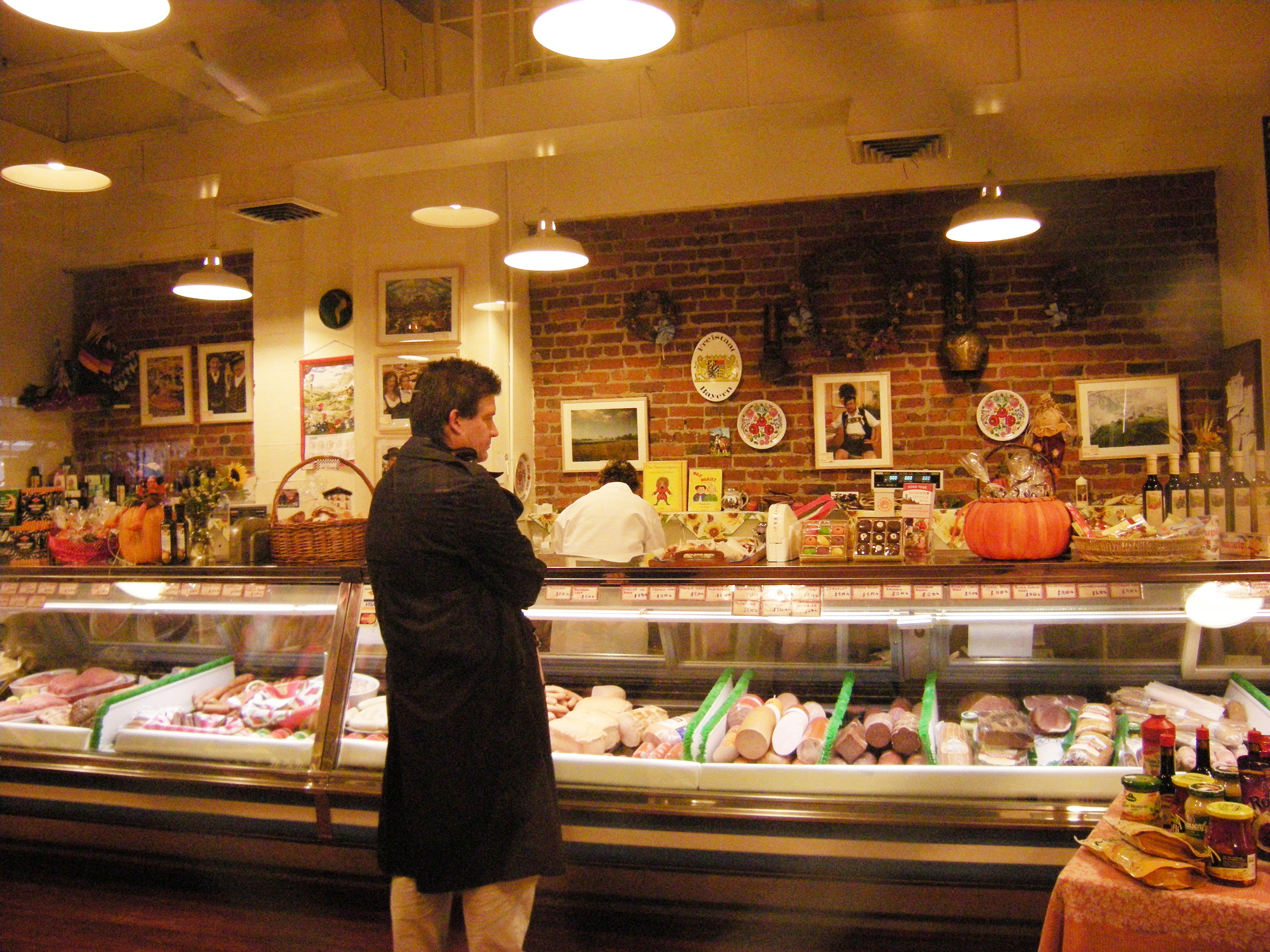
The Bavarian Meats counter at Pike Place Market in 2008

Bavarian Meats operated its own delicatessen at Pike Place Market in Downtown Seattle. The shop served German cuisine such as bratwurst, currywurst, knackwurst, Jäger schnitzel with spätzle and knödel, and weiner schnitzel. The menu also included Reuben sandwiches and whisky cured bacon. The bratwurst meal had sausage, sauerkraut, potatoes, and mustard. The Wrecking Ball sandwich, called an "edible tribute" to the Alaskan Way Viaduct by John Knicely of KIRO-TV, had pulled pork, ham, coleslaw, pickle, and barbecue sauce. Products stocked by Bavarian Meats included German elderflower syrup and Haribo gummies.

== History ==
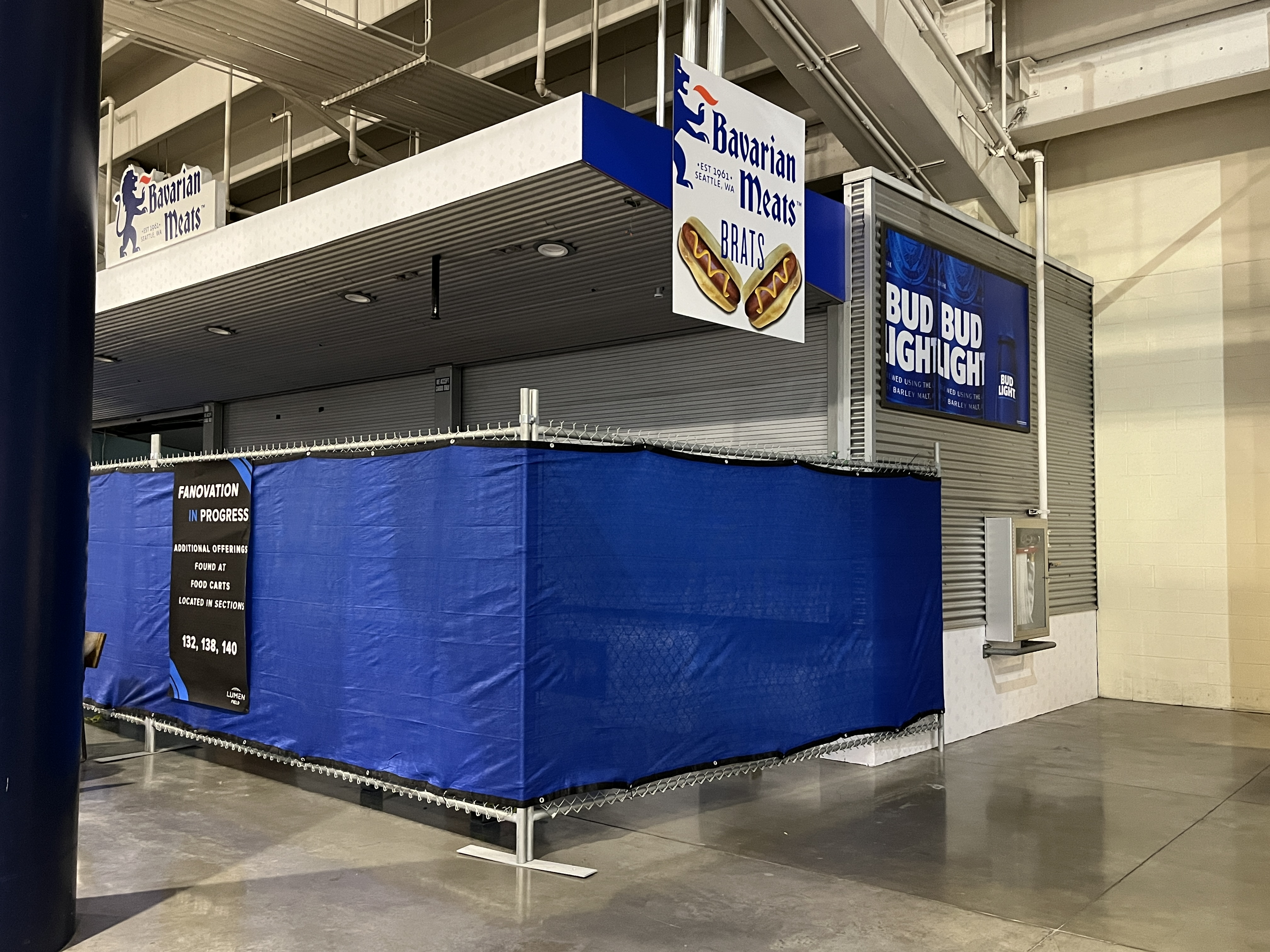
Bavarian Meats stand at Lumen Field, 2023

German immigrant Max Hofstatter ("Grandpa Max") established the sausage-making business at Pike Place Market in 1961, initially in the Municipal Building, which caught on fire in 1974. The family-run business operated mostly via take-out service, but offered on-site dining at times and had a retail branch to supply butchers and other delicatessens. Andrew Zimmern visited the shop in 2017.

Bavarian Meats moved its production facility from Belltown in Seattle to Kent in 2017, selling its former building to an investment firm with plans to build a residential and hotel tower. The Pike Place delicatessen closed in 2020. The family issued a statement suggesting a possible return, saying: "During this challenging time in all our lives it may take us a few extra months to find a home, however, find a home we will!"

== Reception ==
Naomi Tomky included the bratwurst meal in Thrillist's 2016 list of "The 50 Best Things to Eat and Drink at Pike Place Market", writing: "A lunchtime trip to Germany, courtesy of this little meat shop and their lunch counter. The simple bratwurst meal ... is as German as it gets, but also shows off what this place does best: cook good meat. In 2018, Leslie Kelly of Seattle Magazine wrote, "Bavarian Meats not only has one of the most interesting deli counters in the city, it’s become a destination for sausage lovers looking for their lunchtime link fix." Kelly said the Jalapeno Popper Bratwurst "will warm you right up down to your wool socks, with those fiery peppers, cream cheese and caramelized onions tucked inside the casing, turning this German classic into something that once you try it, you're going to go to bed thinking about and wake up craving. Yes, it's that good."

== See also ==
- List of delicatessens
- List of German restaurants
- List of restaurants in Pike Place Market
