= Mee Sum Pastry =

Chinese restaurant in Seattle, Washington, U.S.

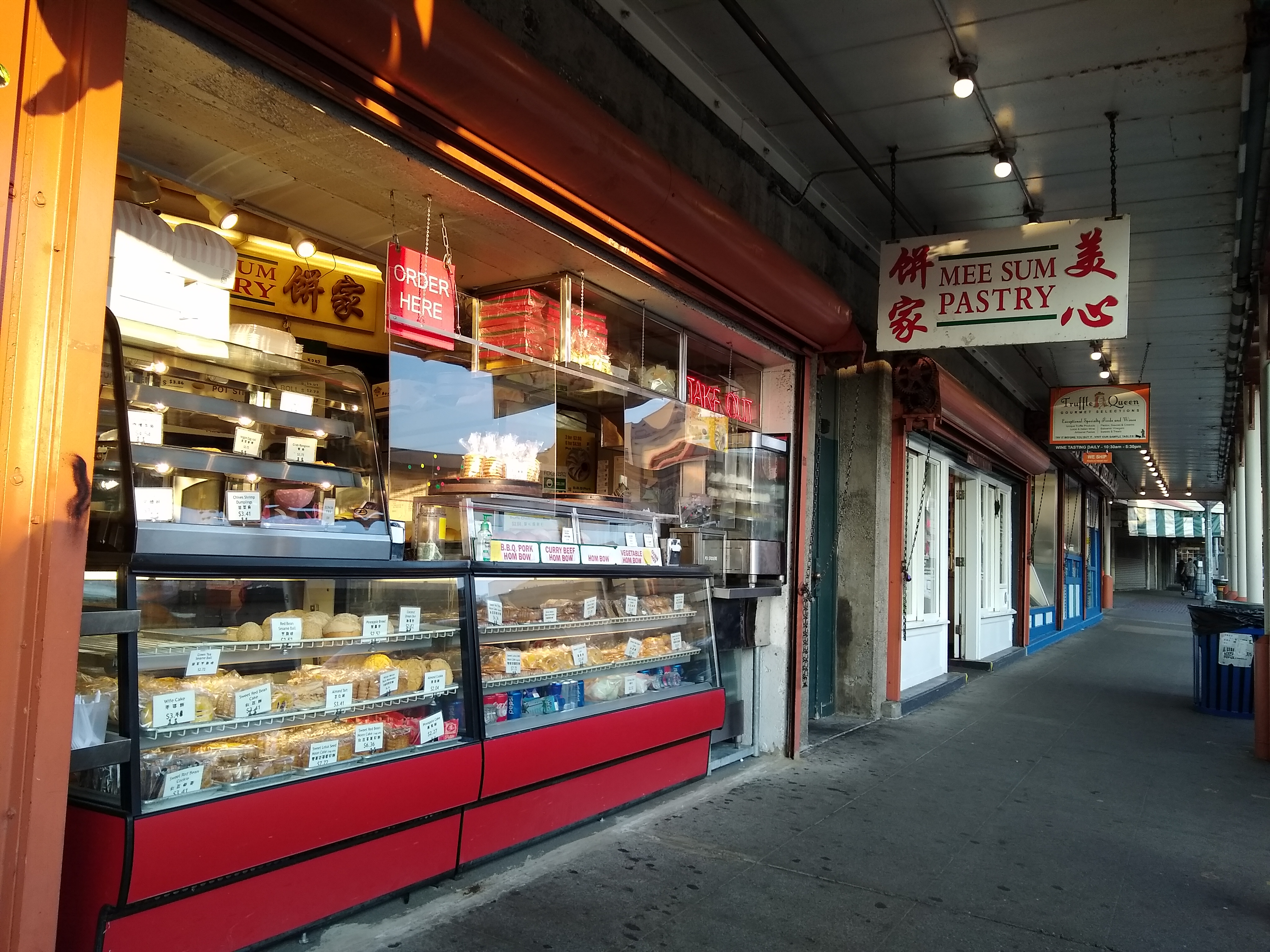
- The restaurant in 2020
- Interactive map of Mee Sum Pastry

Restaurant information
- Food type: Chinese
- Location: Seattle, Washington, United States
- Coordinates: 47.6093°N 122.3414°W

Mee Sum Pastry (simplified Chinese: 美心饼家; traditional Chinese: 美心餅家) is a Chinese restaurant with two locations in Seattle in the U.S. state of Washington. The business operates at Pike Place Market and has a cafe in the University District.

== Description ==
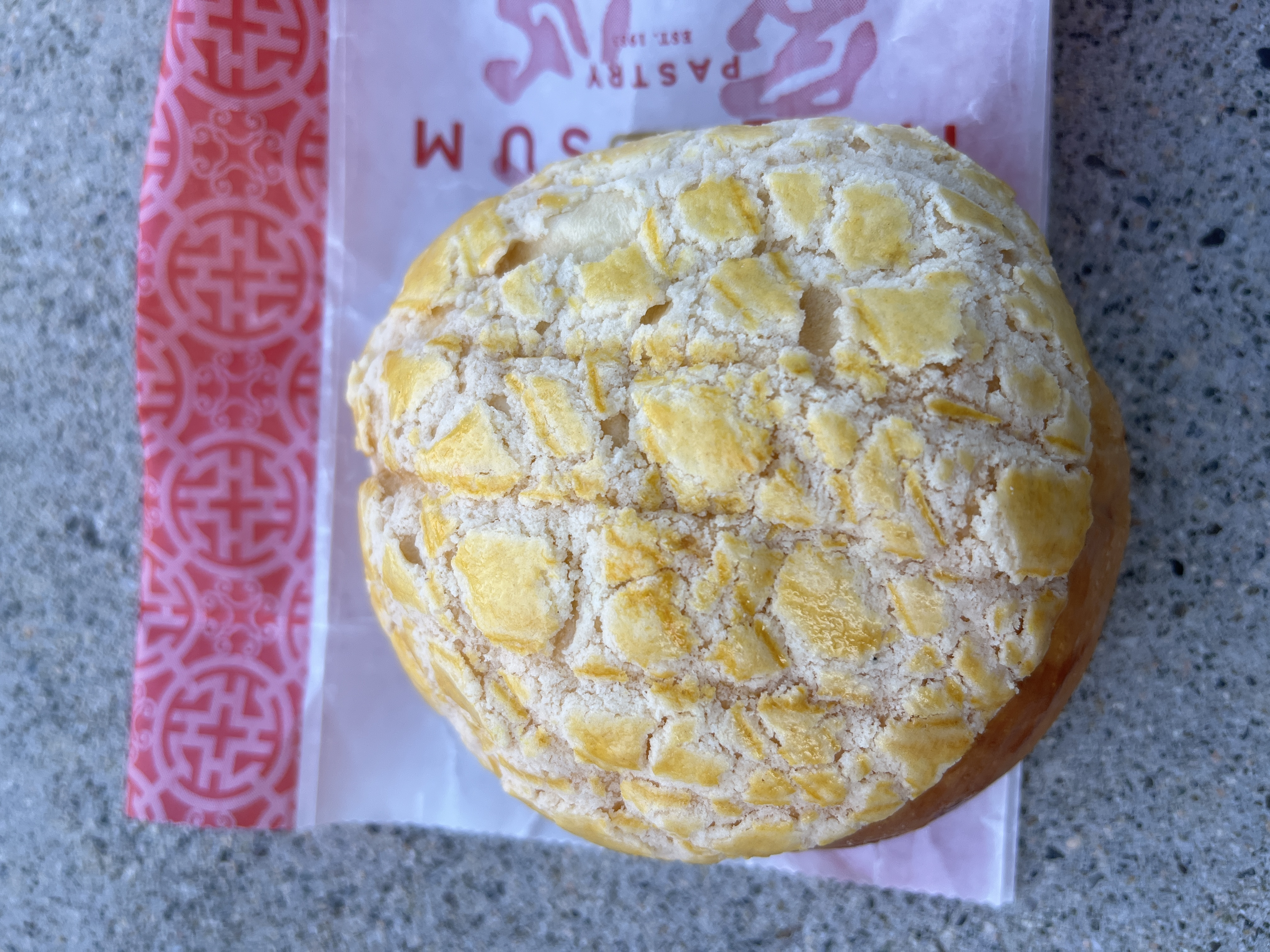
Pineapple bun

Mee Sum Pastry operates in Pike Place Market's Triangle Building. The business serves buns and pastries, including pineapple buns and hom bow (filled with barbecue pork), as well as shumai.

Lonely Planet says, "This little storefront window is famed for its giant hum bao – eminently portable meat- or vegetable-filled steamed buns that make a great snack or small meal. The steamed pork bao is tops."

Thrillist says, "With BBQ pork and supersize potstickers, Mee Sum Pastry is a tried and true institution in the market. It's a no frills, fast moving grab 'n go joint."

== Reception ==
Leonardo David Raymundo and Ryan Lee included Mee Sum Pastry in Eater Seattle's 2021 list of "14 Delightful Dim Sum Restaurants in the Seattle Area".

== See also ==
- History of Chinese Americans in Seattle
- List of Chinese restaurants
- List of restaurant chains in the United States
- List of restaurants in Pike Place Market
