= Cinnamon Works =

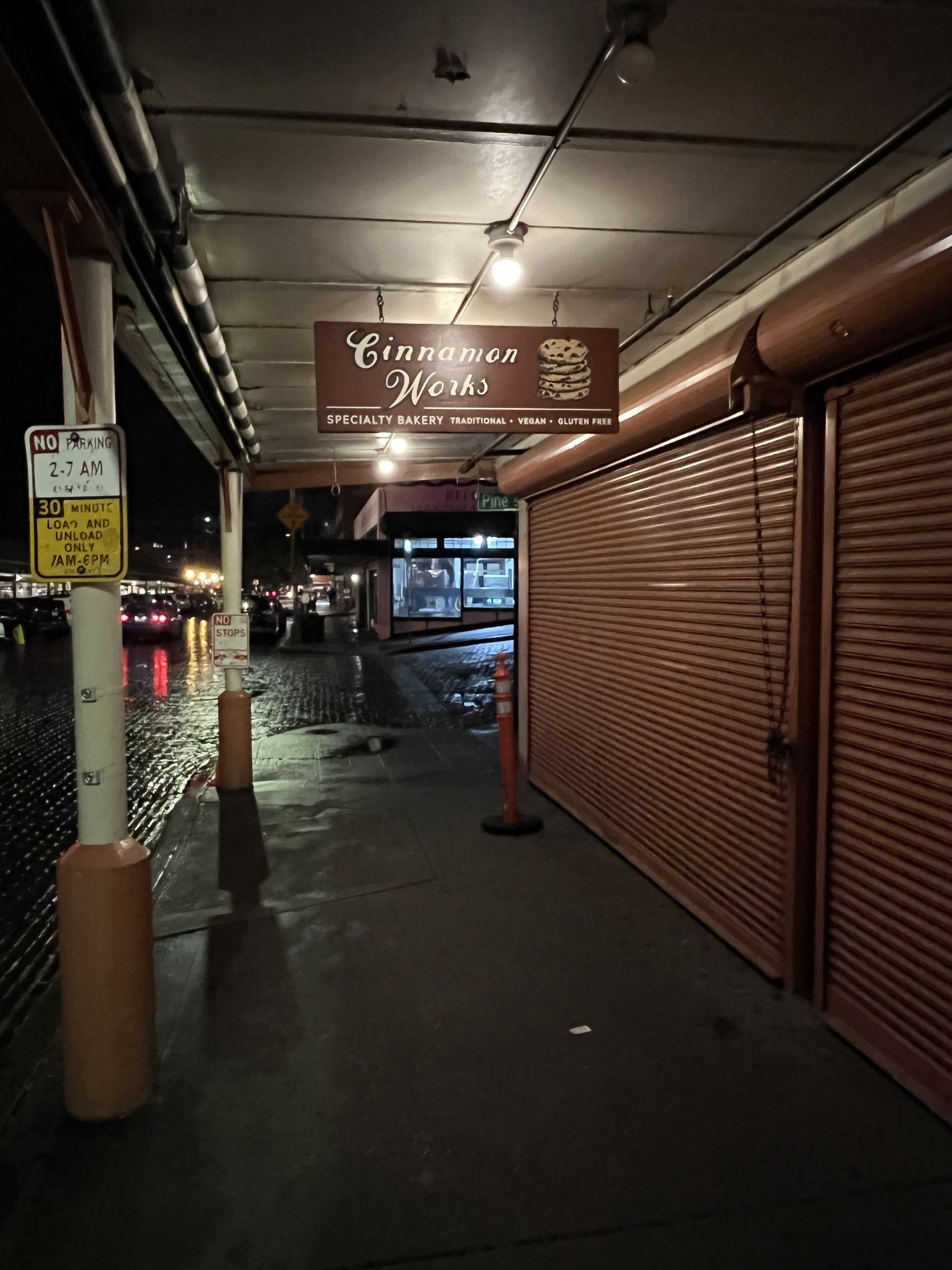
- The shop's exterior at night, 2022
- Interactive map of Cinnamon Works

Restaurant information
- Location: 1536 Pike Place, Seattle, King, Washington, 98101, United States
- Coordinates: 47.6094°N 122.3415°W
- Website: cinnamonworks.com

Cinnamon Works is a bakery in Seattle, Washington, United States. Established in the 1980s, the business operates in the Triangle Building at Pike Place Market.

== Description ==
The bakery Cinnamon Works operates in the Triangle Building at the intersection of Pike Place and Pine Street at Seattle's Pike Place Market. A sign over the stall reads "Hot specialty breads".

The menu includes a variety of cinnamon rolls, cookies, muffins, and other baked goods. Cinnamon roll varieties include plain, frosted, raisin, wheat, and vegan. The restaurant also offers gluten-free cinnamon rolls. Among cookie options is ginger snap, pumpkin, snickerdoodle, the Buckeye, which is topped with a peanut butter cup, and the Monster, which has chocolate chips, M&M's, nuts, and oats.

== History ==
Established in the 1980s, the business has operated for at least 35 years. Judy Beggs and Michael Ruegamer are owners.

== Reception ==
In The Great American Chocolate Chip Cookie Book (2013), Carolyn Wyman said Cinnamon Works had the best gluten-free chocolate chip cookie in Seattle, "according to many". Seattle's Child magazine included the business in a 2015 overview of the best local chocolate chip cookies. Naomi Tomky included the cinnamon rolls in Thrillist's 2016 list of the 50 best food and drink options at Pike Place Market. Kurt Suchman included Cinnamon Works in Eater Seattle's 2025 overview of the city's best cookies.

== See also ==
- List of bakeries
