= Piroshky Piroshky =

Russian bakery based in Seattle, Washington, U.S.

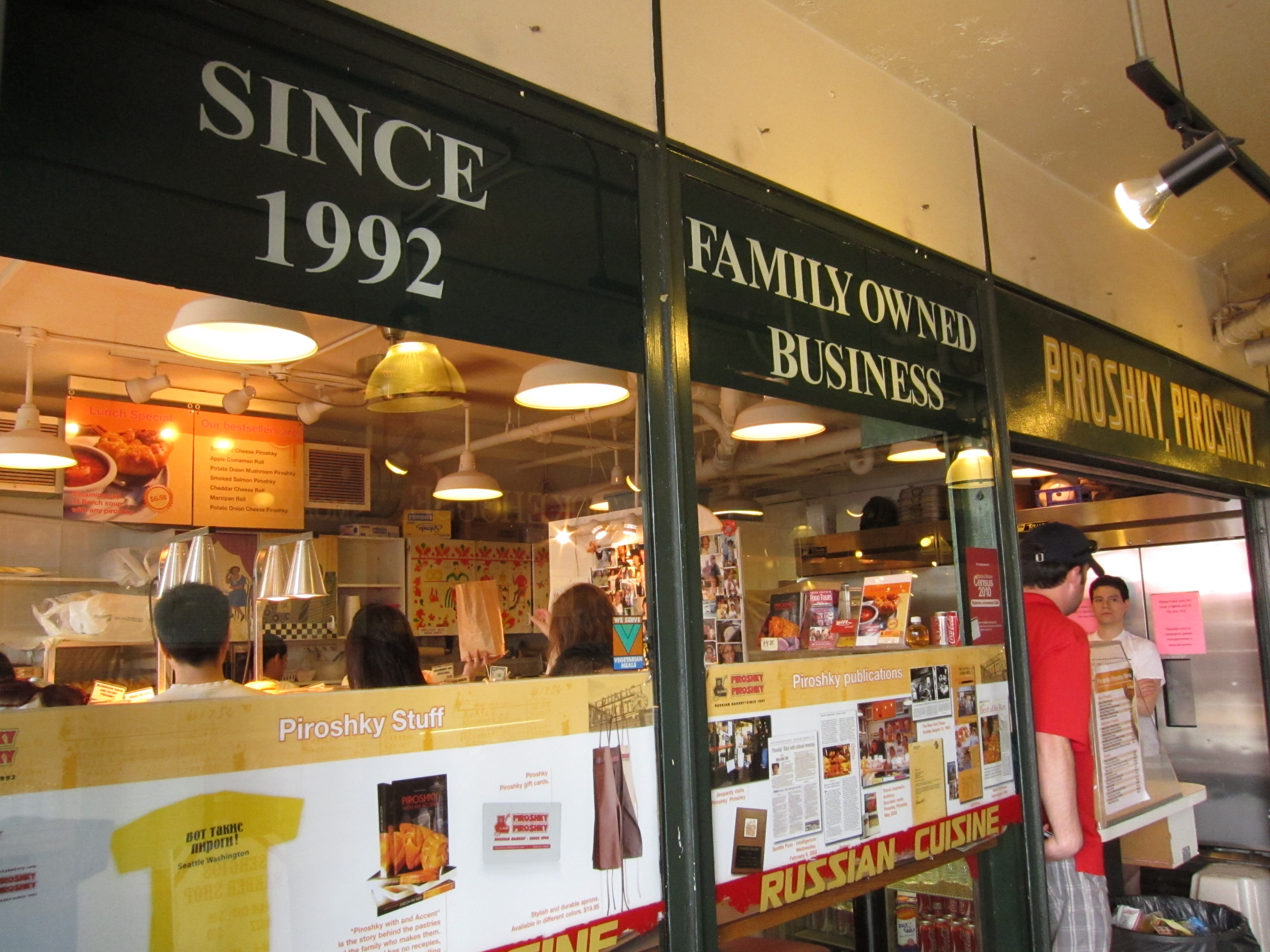
- Interactive map of Piroshky Piroshky

Restaurant information
- Established: 1992
- Owner: Olga Sagan
- Food type: Eastern European (Russian)
- Location: 1908 Pike Place, Seattle
- Coordinates: 47°36′36″N 122°20′33″W
- Other locations: 5 (Century Square, Columbia Center, Convention Center, Kent, Ferndale)
- Website: piroshkybakery.com

Piroshky Piroshky is a Russian bakery based in Seattle, in the U.S. state of Washington.

== Description ==
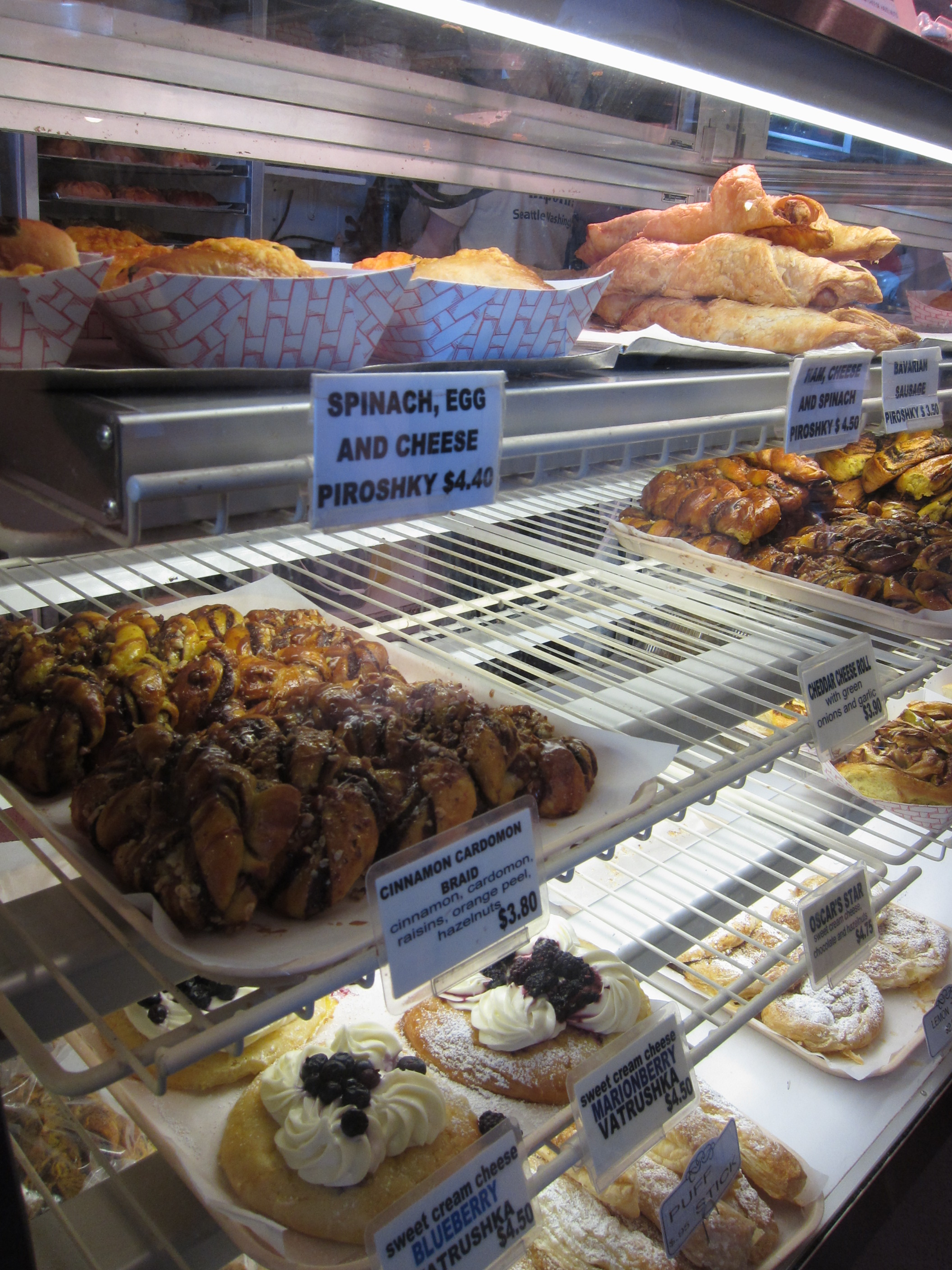
Display case, 2010

The menu includes savory and sweet piroshky (varieties have included beef and cheese, and chicken pot pie), cinnamon cardamom braids, frozen pierogis, pelmeni, borscht, and other pastries.

== History ==
The bakery was established in Pike Place Market in 1992, by Vladimir and Zina Kotelnikov. A few years later, son Oliver took over with Olga Sagan. Sagan became sole owner in 2017.

Between 2014 and 2017, Sagan and Oliver Kotelnikov opened three locations (Northgate, Southcenter and Columbia Center.) There are four locations in Seattle, as of 2022.

The Pike Place Market location appeared on Anthony Bourdain's No Reservations in 2007 and Andrew Zimmern's The Zimmern List in 2017.

By 2018, Piroshky Piroshky had opened its fifth location in Seattle and planned to launch a food truck. The bakery began offering four vegan options in 2019.

The Century Square location closed for over a year during the COVID-19 pandemic in Seattle, but reopened in September 2021. Owner Olga Sagan announced in February 2022 that the location would be temporarily closed, citing an increase in violent crime near the store on 3rd Avenue. Piroshky Piroshky is opening a fourth location in the newly opened Seattle Convention Center (SCC) expansion.

== Reception ==
Marina Koren included Piroshky Piroshky in Smithsonian magazine's 2013 list of "The 20 Most Iconic Food Destinations Across America".

== See also ==
- List of bakeries
- List of companies based in Seattle
- List of restaurants in Pike Place Market
- List of restaurants in Seattle
- List of Russian restaurants
