= Le Panier =

Bakery in Seattle, Washington, U.S.

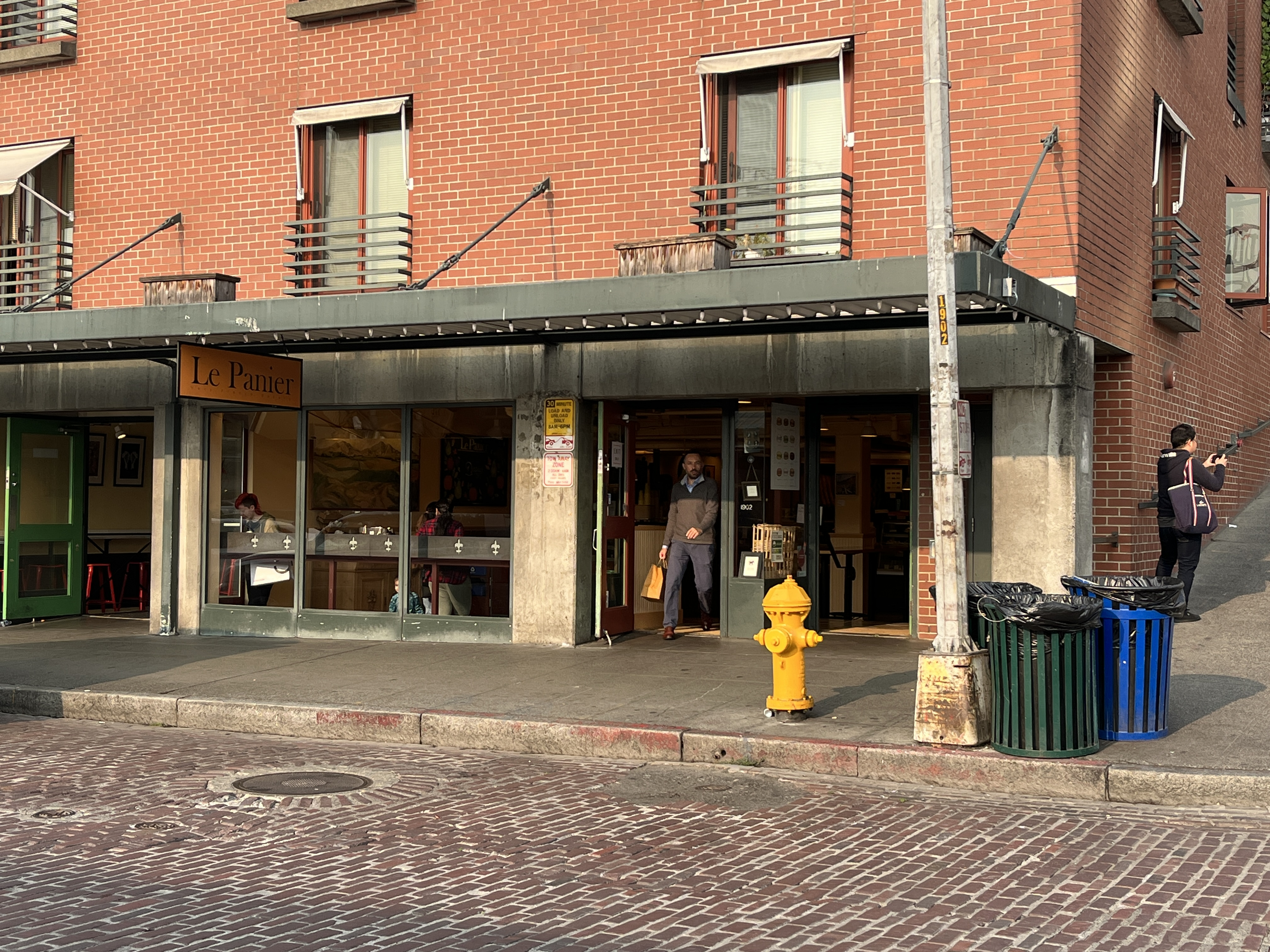
- The restaurant's exterior, 2022
- Interactive map of Le Panier

Restaurant information
- Established: 1983
- Owners: Kristi Drake; Thierry Mougin
- Previous owner: Hubert Loevenbruck
- Food type: French
- Location: 1902 Pike Place, Seattle, Washington, 98101, United States
- Coordinates: 47.6098°N 122.3422°W
- Website: lepanier.com

Le Panier is a bakery and pasty shop at Seattle's Pike Place Market, in the U.S. state of Washington. The business was established in 1983.

== Description ==
The French bakery, located at Pike Place Market in Seattle's Central Waterfront district, has served baguettes, chouquettes, croissants, feuilletés with vegetables such as champignons and asparagus, macarons, meringues, pain au chocolat, and hazelnut sablé cookies.

In 2016, Lauren Rothman of Time Out Seattle said "this classic French boulangerie and patisserie pays equal loving attention to both its collection of breads and pastries. Its seasonally changing menu incorporates temporal ingredients into both—think pumpkin macarons and a French loaf studded with caramelized onions—and a range of savory tartlets tempts with bacon, egg and cheese, creamy chicken and more options."

The shop has also served king cakes ("La Galette des Rois") for Mardi Gras.

== History ==
Hubert Loevenbruck founded Le Panier in 1983. Kristi Drake and Thierry Mougin purchased the business from him in 1995. The restaurant participated in Sweet Week in 2015.

== Reception ==
Naomi Tomky included the pain au chocolat in Thrillist's 2016 list of the 50 "best things to eat and drink" at Pike Place Market.

Eater Seattle included Le Panier in a 2021 list of "Seattle bakeries that will satisfy any sweet tooth". The website said, "Le Panier is exactly the kind of Seattle classic that makes a visit worth it, rarely disappointing for its wide selection of French-influenced pastries." In 2020, during the COVID-19 pandemic, Eater Seattle included the business in an overview of "where to buy fresh bread and pastries for takeout or delivery in Seattle right now" and said, "everything is spot on, and like any good French bakery, its baguettes rock". Jade Yamazaki Stewart included Le Panier in the website's 2022 list of 20 "great" restaurants near Pike Place Market and wrote, "The scent of buttery, soft, flakey croissants draws diners inevitably to one of the city’s best French bakeries, but don’t be discouraged by the long lines, as they move quickly."

Brittany Natale selected Le Panier for Washington in Eat This, Not That's 2022 list of the best croissants in each U.S. state.

== See also ==
- List of bakeries
- List of French restaurants
- List of restaurants in Pike Place Market
