= Carmelo's Tacos =

Mexican restaurant in Seattle, Washington, U.S.

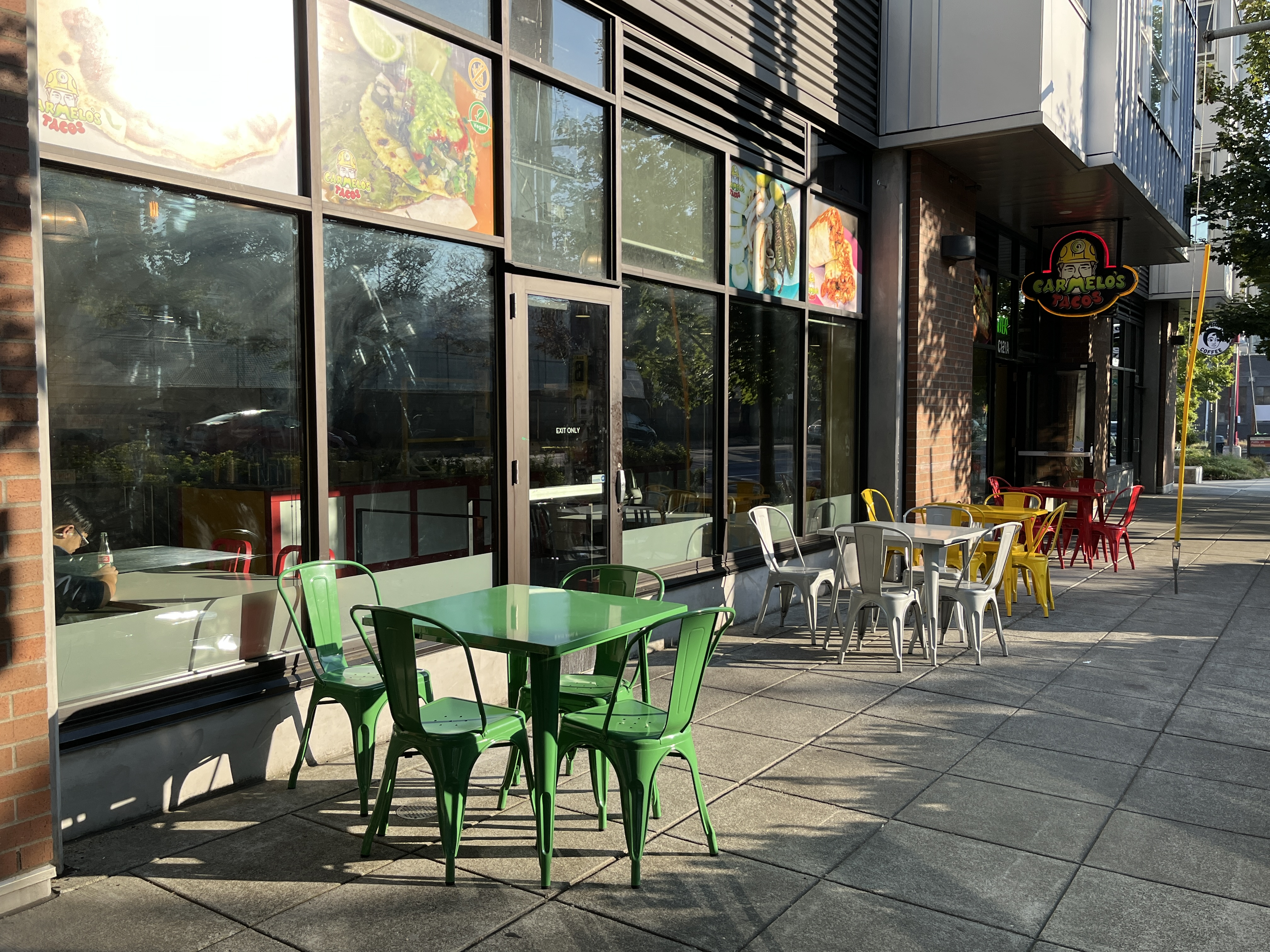
- Exterior of the restaurant on Cherry Street, 2022

Restaurant information
- Established: 2018
- Owners: Carmelo Gaspar; Raul Delfin
- Food type: Mexican
- Location: Seattle, Washington, U.S.

Carmelo's Tacos (sometimes Carmelos Tacos) is a Mexican restaurant with three locations in Seattle, in the U.S. state of Washington.

== Description ==
Carmelo's Tacos is a Latino family-owned Mexican restaurant with three locations in Seattle. The business serves Mexico City-style street food such as tacos (al pastor, asada, and campechano varieties), burritos (including breakfast burritos), churros, and quesadillas. The vegan mushroom taco has garlic and guajillo chile seasoning. The campechano has steak, chorizo, and potato.

== History ==
Founded by Carmelo Gaspar in 2018, Carmelo's Tacos operated at a counter in Hillcrest Market, on Capitol Hill. Raul Delfin is also an owner. In 2021, owners announced plans to expand to Cherry Street, near Seattle University. The outpost replaced Oma Bap, which closed in 2020. The 1,300 square-foot space can accommodate approximately 30 people and features an outdoor patio. The business also operates on Broadway.

== Reception ==
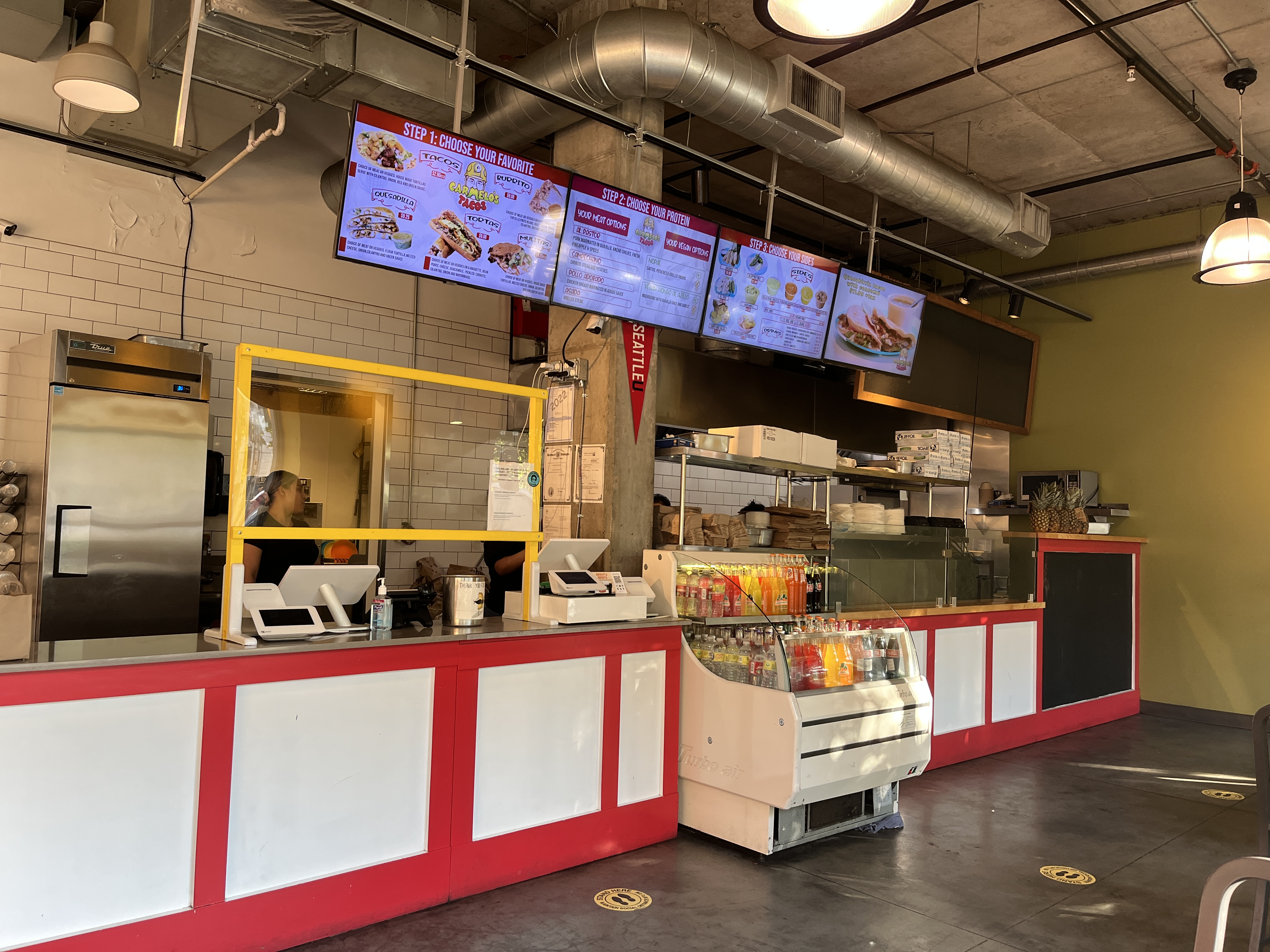
Interior of the Cherry Street location

In 2020, The Daily Meal selected Carmelo's Tacos for Washington in a list of "The Best Taco in Every State". Seattle Metropolitan says, "Pure joy will only cost you $2.50 inside the Hillcrest Market (or its walkup window) on Capitol Hill, where a family-run counter creates Mexico City–style tacos that aren't just great but divine."

In 2021, during the COVID-19 pandemic, Alana Al-Hatlani included Carmelo's Tacos in Eater Seattle's list of "15 Solid Takeout Windows and Curbside Pickup Options in Seattle". The website's Megan Hill and Jade Yamazaki Stewart included the business in a 2022 list of "15 Spots for Fantastic Tacos in the Seattle Area". Stewart, Gabe Guarante, and Mark Van Streefkerk also included Carmelo's Tacos in a 2022 overview of "25 Essential Capitol Hill Restaurants". The business was also included in a 2025 overview of the best restaurants on Capitol Hill. Emily Iris Degn included the business in Tasting Table's 2026 list of Seattle's nine best restaurants for tacos.

== See also ==
- List of Mexican restaurants
- List of restaurant chains in the United States
