= Sal Y Limón =

Mexican restaurant in Seattle, Washington, U.S.

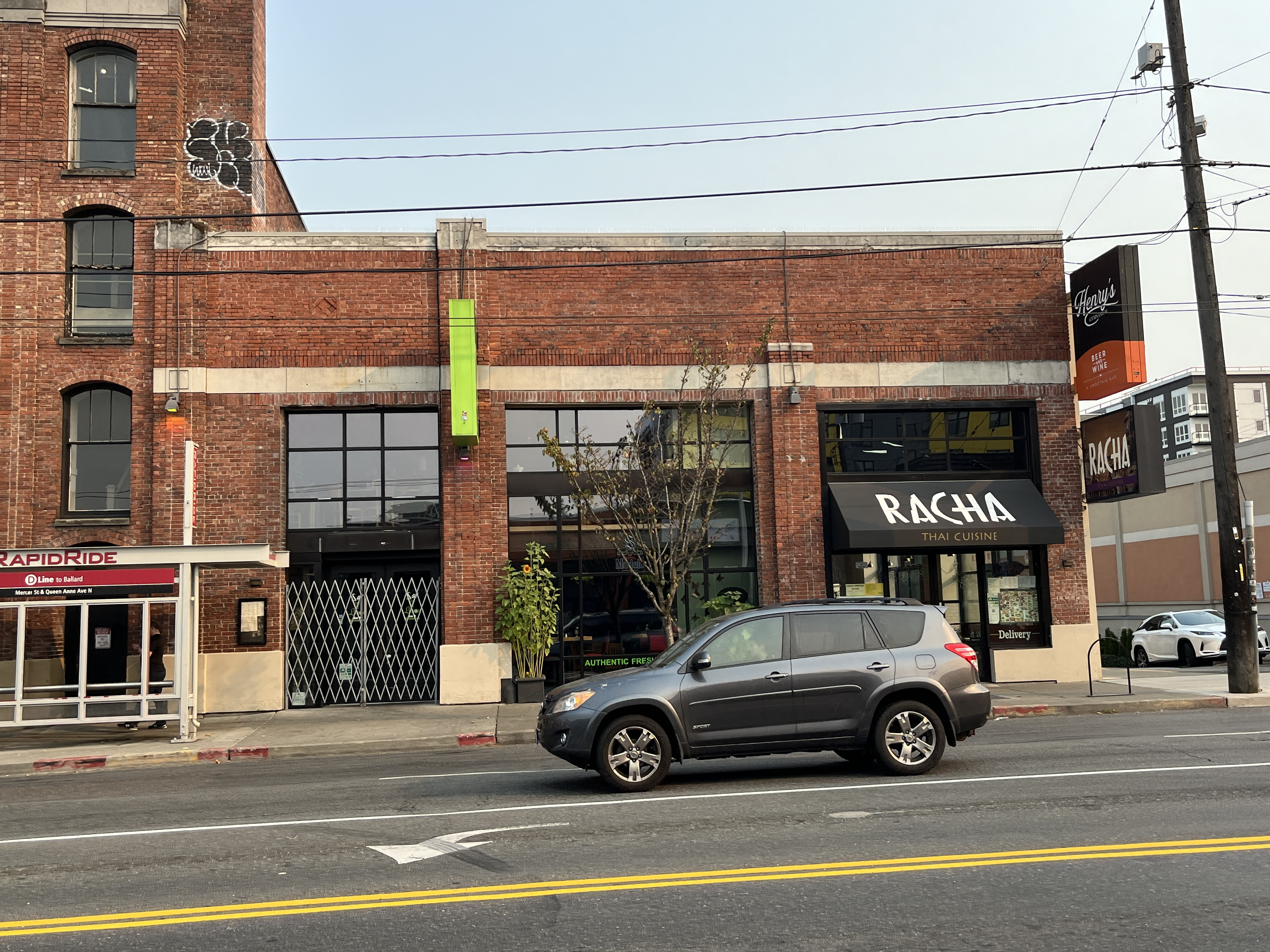
- The restaurant's exterior, 2024
- Interactive map of Sal Y Limón

Restaurant information
- Established: 2018
- Food type: Mexican
- Location: 10 Mercer Street, Seattle, King, Washington, 98109, United States
- Coordinates: 47.6247°N 122.3563°W
- Website: salylimonseattle.com

Sal Y Limón is a Mexican restaurant in Seattle, in the U.S. state of Washington. Jesus and Alexis Magaña opened the restaurant in 2018. It has garnered a positive reception.

== Description ==
The Mexican restaurant Sal Y Limón (Spanish for "salt and lemon") operates in Seattle's Queen Anne neighborhood, in a building called MarQueen. Eater Seattle has described the Latin American-owned restaurant as a "lively" establishment "in one of the most lively stretches of Uptown (the neighborhood formerly known as Lower Queen Anne)." The interior features a "centerpiece paperclip-shaped bar that recedes into the two-level back bar".

=== Menu ===
The menu includes pollo asado, seafood enchiladas, street tacos, pozole and other stews, ceviche, margaritas, and chips and salsa. Among meat options is alambre, which has steak, bacon, bell peppers, and cheese. On the drink menu, the Cuba Mexicana has Cazadores Reposado with citrus soda, lime, and salt. The happy hour menu has included nachos.

== History ==
The father and son team of Jesus and Alexis Magaña opened Sal Y Limón in 2018, in the space previously occupied by Ten Mercer.

== Reception ==
Aimee Rizzo included the business in The Infatuation's 2020 list of the best meals in Seattle for $30 or less. She has also recommended the restaurant for group dinners. During the COVID-19 pandemic, Eater Seattle included Sal Y Limón in an overview of the city's best take-out eateries for tacos. In the website's 2022 list of ten "great" eateries near the Seattle Center, Jade Yamazaki Stewart called the stews "satisfying and filling" and said Sal Y Limón "serves some of the best under-the-radar Mexican food in the central Seattle area at surprisingly affordable prices". In 2023, Harry Cheadle, Charlie Lahud-Zahner, included the business in Eater Seattle's list of fourteen "mouth-watering" Mexican restaurants in the metropolitan area. They called the green ceviche "balanced and generously portioned" and said the business "receives shockingly little recognition considering the breadth and consistent quality of its menu". The website's also included Sal Y Limón in a 2024 overview of the metropolitan area's "most underrated" restaurants.

== See also ==
- List of Mexican restaurants
