= Tacos de jamón =

Tiny crumbs of Spanish ham

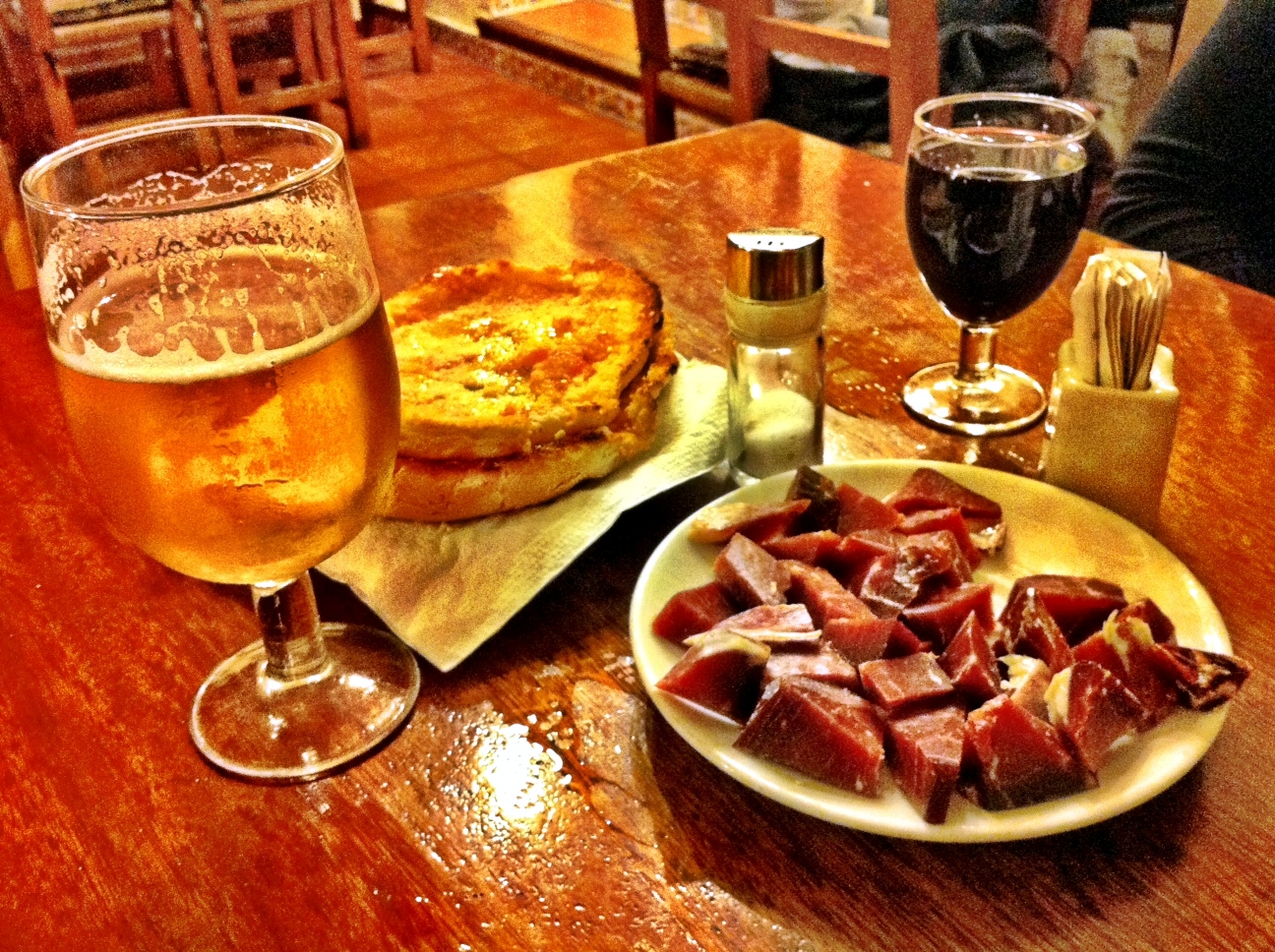

Tacos de jamón (Ham cubes, also known as ham shavings) are tiny crumbs, shreds, or leftovers of the lean part cut from Spanish ham. In Spanish cuisine, they are commonly used in certain preparations as flavorings and seasoning for various dishes, and are also served as tapas. They are usually marketed as "cubes" or as sliced portions, generally vacuum-packed. They are generally sold at comparatively lower prices than lean ham meat and may even have a slightly rancid flavor.

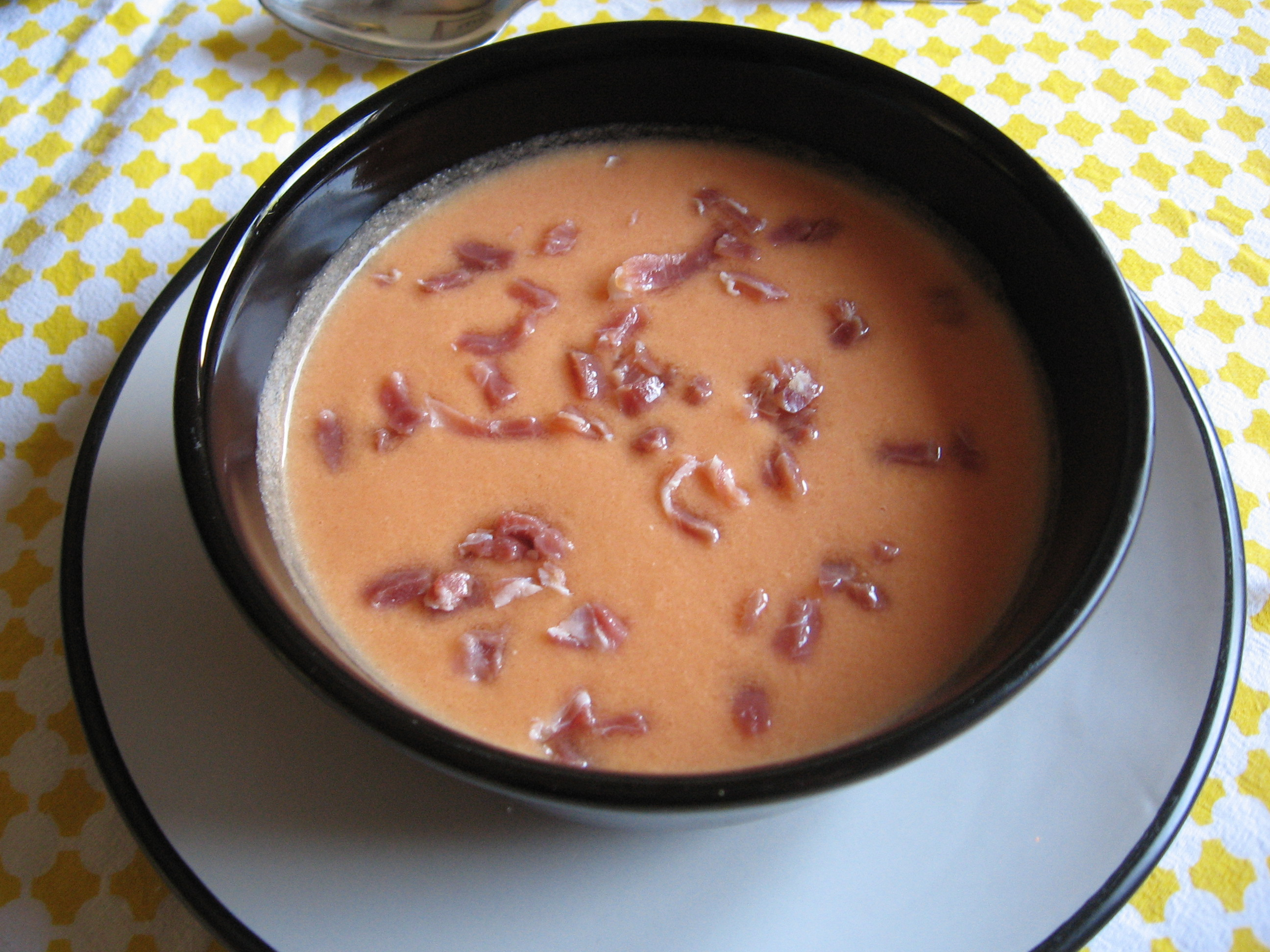

== Uses ==
Ham cubes can be used in a wide variety of culinary preparations, such as egg omelettes with ham, as toppings for cold soups such as salmorejo, or in desserts like melon with ham. Pizzas that include these shavings among their ingredients are known as "pizzas serranas". They are also used as filling in certain empanadas, as a sofrito for some soups, in salads, in the preparation of vegetable dishes such as menestra, and in legume dishes such as lentils with ham. In some areas of southern Spain, both shavings and cubes are served as tapas.

Since the early 21st century, ham shavings have also been sold in some major Spanish cities in paper cones as a form of street food, even directly at street stalls, generally at lower prices than traditional sliced ham.
