= Famous Taco sandwich ruling =

2024 court case in Indiana, United States

The Famous Taco sandwich ruling was a 2024 civil court case in Allen County, Indiana, over the definition of a sandwich.

Fort Wayne Mexican restaurant Famous Taco was the plaintiff. The case received coverage on NBC's Today Show and from The New York Times. The dispute originated when Famous Taco owner Martin Quintana was met with obstacles when attempting to open a second location for the franchise in a strip mall on the city's southwest side. These complications were rooted in municipal zoning restrictions set forth by the government. Only made-to-order sandwich restaurants were permitted in the strip mall under these ordinances. Quintana had filed a lawsuit against the Fort Wayne Plan Commission in December 2022 over this, after they had denied permission to build the store in that location. Plans to build the second location had been publicly announced two months earlier.

In May 2024, Judge Craig Bobay of the Allen County Superior Court ruled that a taco is a "Mexican-style sandwich". The court said "a Famous Taco restaurant is permissible under the terms of the original Written Commitment." American conservative newspaper New York Post called the decision "polarizing". The ruling enabled the opening of the new location. Quintana commented: "We were fighting, trying to open this store for over two years. We couldn't get any luck until the judge came with that decision. We were very thankful with that decision."
