= Planet Taco =

Book on culinary history

First edition

Planet Taco: A Global History of Mexican Food is a non-fiction book by Jeffrey Pilcher, published by the Oxford University Press in 2012. Pilcher discusses the history of Mexican cuisine and Tex Mex cuisine as well as perceptions of the concept of "Mexican food" around the world.

Kristen Gremillion of Ohio State University stated that in covering the perceptions of Mexican food, the book goes beyond being "a straightforward history".

== Contents ==
One chapter discusses the French influence on the food of the Mexican elite and the Pastry War. The work also discusses the 1800s development of Tex Mex cuisine. The work also describes how Mexican-inspired food globalized and how the image of what Mexican food is was shaped by that.

The book describes how the invention of the taco was late in the chronology of Mexican cuisine.

Pilcher argues that the view of Tex Mex cuisine being inauthentic is a misreading of its true origins and is steeped in elitism.

The book has a glossary of vocabulary involved in Mexican cuisine.

== Reception ==
Arnold J. Bauer of University of California, Davis overall praised the book as "originally conceived, broadly researched and engagingly written" and characterized his criticism of some elements as minor.

Gremillion stated the book is "erudite and wonderfully engaging".

Mark Knoblauch of Booklist argued that the book has a "comprehensive bibliography" which shows the "meticulous research".
