= Alambre =

Mexican food

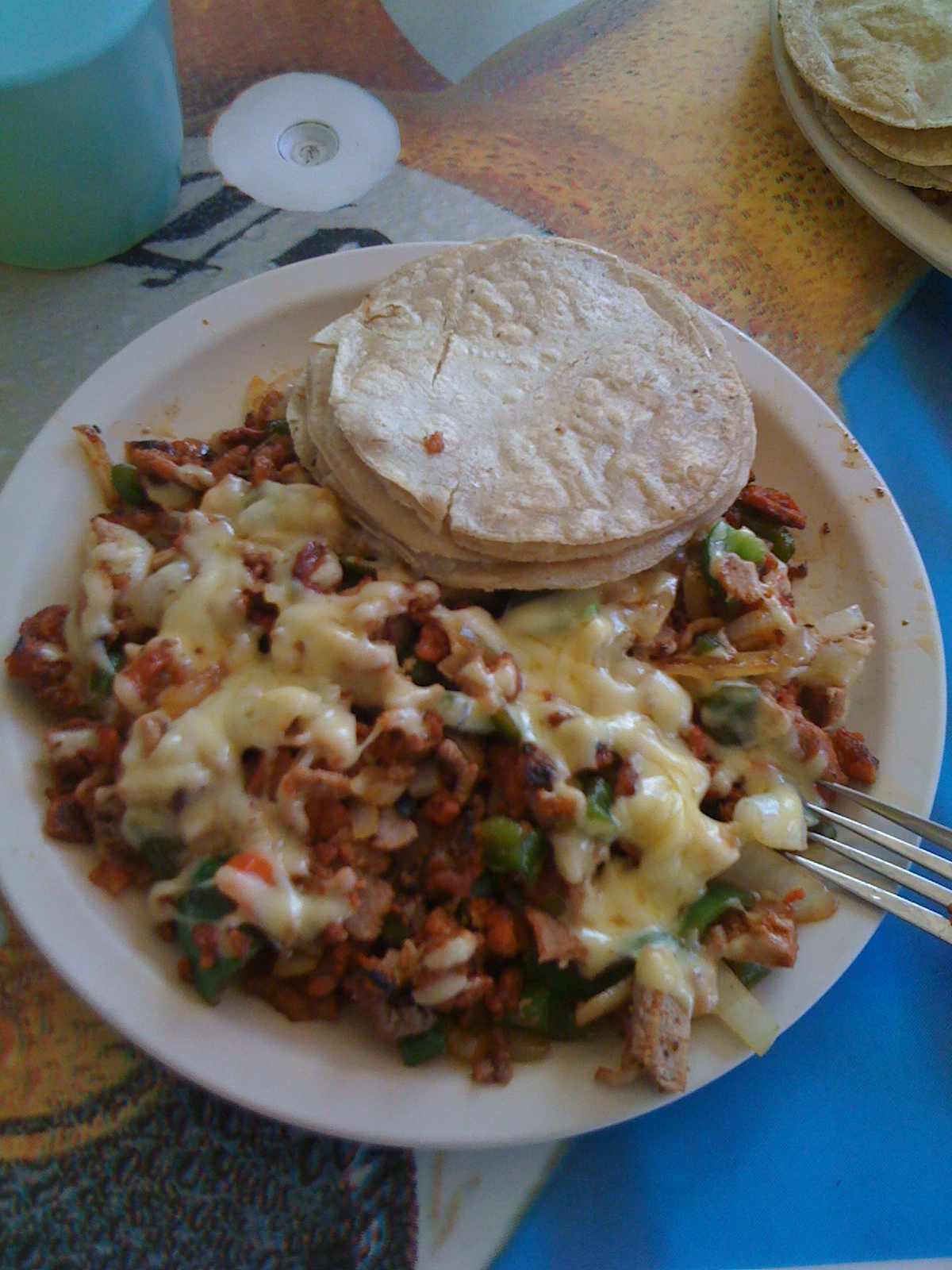
- Alambre with corn tortillas
- Course: Main course
- Place of origin: Mexico
- Serving temperature: warm
- Main ingredients: Meat (usually beef), chopped bacon, bell pepper, onion, cheese
- Variations: Chorizo, ham

Alambre (Spanish: [aˈlambɾe]) is a Mexican dish consisting of a choice of meat—popular choices include grilled beef, al pastor, chicken, and shrimp—topped with chopped bacon, bell peppers, onions, cheese, salsa, and in some variations, avocado. Similar to fajitas, it is usually served with freshly made corn or flour tortillas. The most common ingredient is beef, and other kinds of meat such as chicken or pork are also used. Some recipes substitute bacon by chopped ham or chorizo.

== Etymology ==
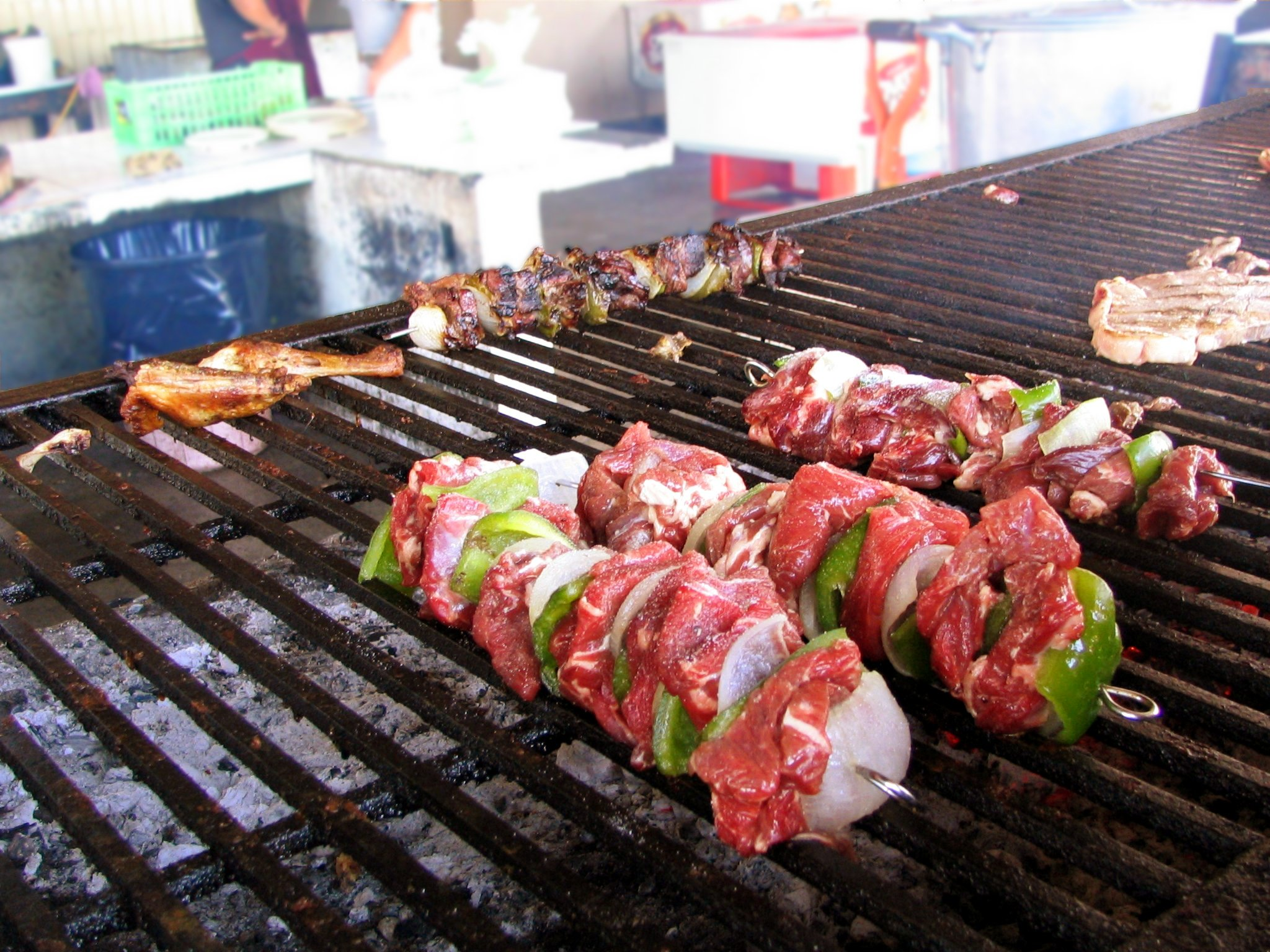
Alambres barbecued on skewers

The word alambre literally means "wire" in Spanish. It is commonly believed that the name refers to the act of skewering the ingredients while cooking, although this is not always done.

== See also ==
- List of Mexican dishes
