= Gringas =

Variety of tacos

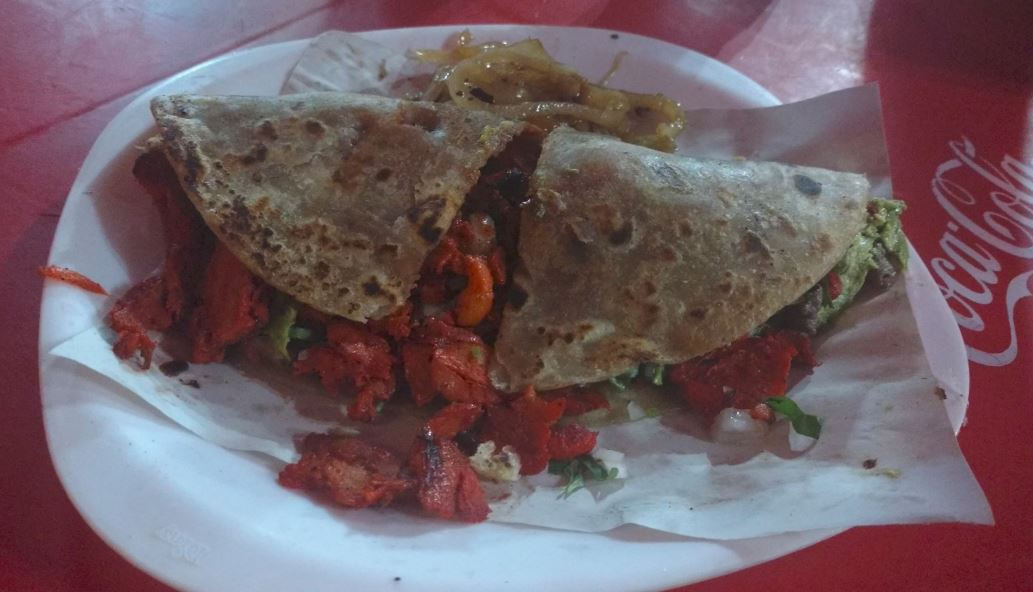
- Type: Finger food
- Course: Main course
- Place of origin: Mexico
- Region or state: Northern Mexico
- Serving temperature: Warm
- Main ingredients: Marinated pork meat; Cheese; Flour tortilla
- Ingredients generally used: Onion; Cilantro; Pineapple
- Variations: Tacos al pastor
- Similar dishes: Quesadillas

Gringas (Spanish pronunciation: [ˈɡɾiŋɡas], plural and feminine form of gringo) are a variety of quesadillas which consist of flour tortillas filled with cheese, al pastor meat, and pineapple. They are then grilled in the same manner as a quesadilla. Some attribute the name to the use of white flour tortillas.
