= Al pastor =

Mexican spit-grilled pork seasoned with adobada

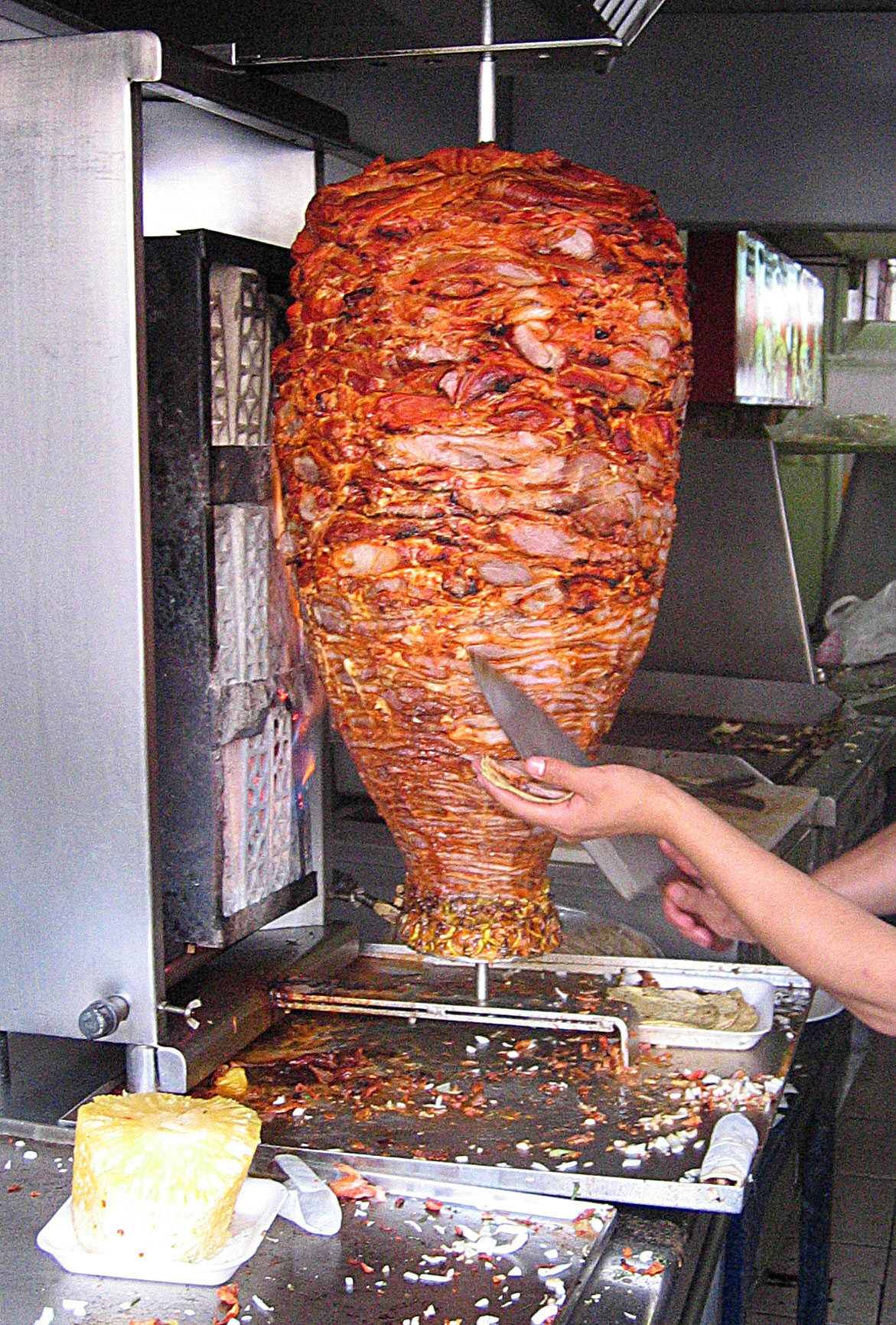
- Carne al pastor (al pastor meat) on a trompo
- Course: Main course
- Place of origin: Mexico
- Region or state: Puebla
- Associated cuisine: Mexican
- Created by: Lebanese Mexicans
- Serving temperature: Warm
- Main ingredients: Marinated pork meat
- Ingredients generally used: Onion; Cilantro; Pineapple
- Variations: Gringas

Al pastor (from Spanish, "herdsman style"), tacos al pastor, or tacos de trompo is a preparation of sliced, spit-grilled meat, usually pork, originating in the Central Mexican region of Puebla where they remain most prominent, though it is a common menu item found in taquerías throughout Mexico. The method of preparing and cooking al pastor is based on the lamb shawarma brought by Lebanese immigrants to the region. Al pastor features a flavor palette that uses traditional Mexican adobada (marinade). It is a popular street food that has spread to the United States. In some places of northern Mexico and coastal Mexico, such as in Baja California, taco al pastor is known as taco de trompo or taco de adobada.

A variation of the dish that uses a combination of Middle Eastern spices and indigenous central Mexican ingredients is called tacos árabes.

== Name ==
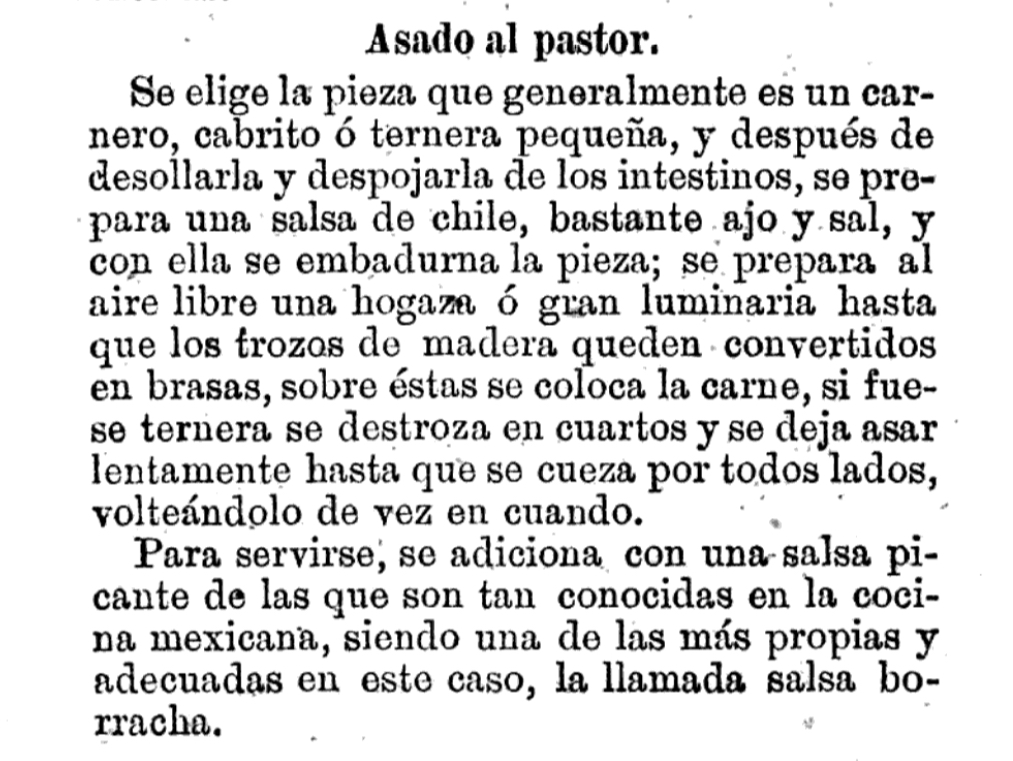
An asado al pastor recipe from 1888.

The name “al pastor”, which literally translates to “herdsman”, “cowherd” or “shepherd” style, comes from «asado al pastor», which can be translated as “spit roast” or “spit barbecue” over an open fire. The asado al pastor, also known as “asado del pastor”, “carbonada” and “asado a la estaca”, was one of the styles for roasting or “barbecuing” meats in the Mexican countryside, the other one being barbacoa. Whole animals, commonly veal, bull, cow, or mutton, or pieces of meat, were skewered with a “spit” or “estaca” (stake) and placed over an open fire to be roasted.

In the Mexican cookbook Diccionario de Cocina o El Nuevo Cocinero Mexicano en Forma de Diccionario (1845), Manuel Galvan Rivera explains that there are different classes or types of asados (roasts or barbecues) in Mexican cuisine:

“ASADO: There are different types of asados: over fire or del pastor; on a gridiron or over a grill; in an oven or fried with lard, butter or oil.”

Galvan Rivera also explains that “carbonada” (which can be translated as “over coal”) was another name for an “asado del pastor”:

“CARBONADA: this name is given to lean slices of bull, pork, cow, etc., roasted after being cooked or raw, over embers or on the grill. Meats roasted like this are also often called asado del pastor.”

The asado al pastor was widely prepared in Mexico at countryside festivities, such as rodeos (cattle roundups), herraderos (cattle branding celebrations), jaripeos and bull-fights, patron saint festivities of the hacienda, or family picnics. 19th-century Mexican writer Domingo Revilla wrote in 1844 and 1845, respectively, that the “banquet” at the herraderos was reduced to asados al pastor and barbacoa of whole calves (veal), bull or mutton, and explained that asados al pastor were more common in Tierra Adentro or the Bajío region, western Mexico, and beyond, while barbacoa was more common in the Mezquital and Apan valleys and surrounding areas in central Mexico.

An anecdote collected by Victoriano Salado Álvarez tells that, as part of a Mexican Independence celebration in 1856, a whole bull was roasted al pastor style in the middle of the Alameda Central in Mexico City, and that among the guests was President Ignacio Comonfort:

“If we were to ask now for a whole bull, roasted al pastor, to be served on a table set in the Alameda, so that all citizens would have the right to a slice of the meat, and for the shoemaker, the pot-painter, and the tinsmith to immediately fraternize with the President of the Republic, greeting him with hands full of the noblest calluses and grease from the beef, the people would laugh at us and want to send us to the asylum. Well, that, and nothing less, happened on September 16th, in the unfortunate year of 1856; I saw it, took part in it, and enjoyed it immensely. The banquet was well-timed; the crowd was enormous; the pleasure and good humor were enormous. As always, it had been announced that Comonfort would be killed in the middle of the feast; but, as always, he had laughed at the warnings.”

== History ==
During the 19th century, variations of a vertically grilled meat dish doner, now known by several names, started to spread throughout the Ottoman Empire. The Levantine version, called shawarma, was brought to Mexico in the late 19th and early 20th centuries by a wave of Lebanese immigrants, mainly Christians who have no religious dietary restrictions on eating pork.

By the 1920s, lamb meat was mostly replaced by pork. The Mexican-born progeny of Lebanese immigrants also began opening their own restaurants. Later, in Mexico City, they began to marinate with adobo and use corn tortillas, which resulted in the al pastor taco. It is unknown when they began to be prepared as we know them today; however, some agree that it was in the 1960s when they became popular.

== Preparation ==
Pork is marinated in a combination of dried chilies, spices, pineapple, and typically achiote paste, then slowly cooked with charcoal or gas flame on a vertical rotisserie called a trompo (lit. 'spinning top'), the meat is shaved off as the outside is browned, and made into tacos. Guajillo chile, garlic, cumin, clove, bay leaf, and vinegar are common ingredients, with cinnamon, dried Mexican oregano, coriander, and black peppercorns found in many variants. Meat is thinly sliced off the spit with a large knife into a small corn tortilla and served with finely chopped onions, cilantro, and diced pineapple. A wedge of lemon or lime and a salsa are optional condiments. This meat is also a common ingredient in gringas, alambres, huaraches, tortas, burritos, and pizza.

== Varieties ==
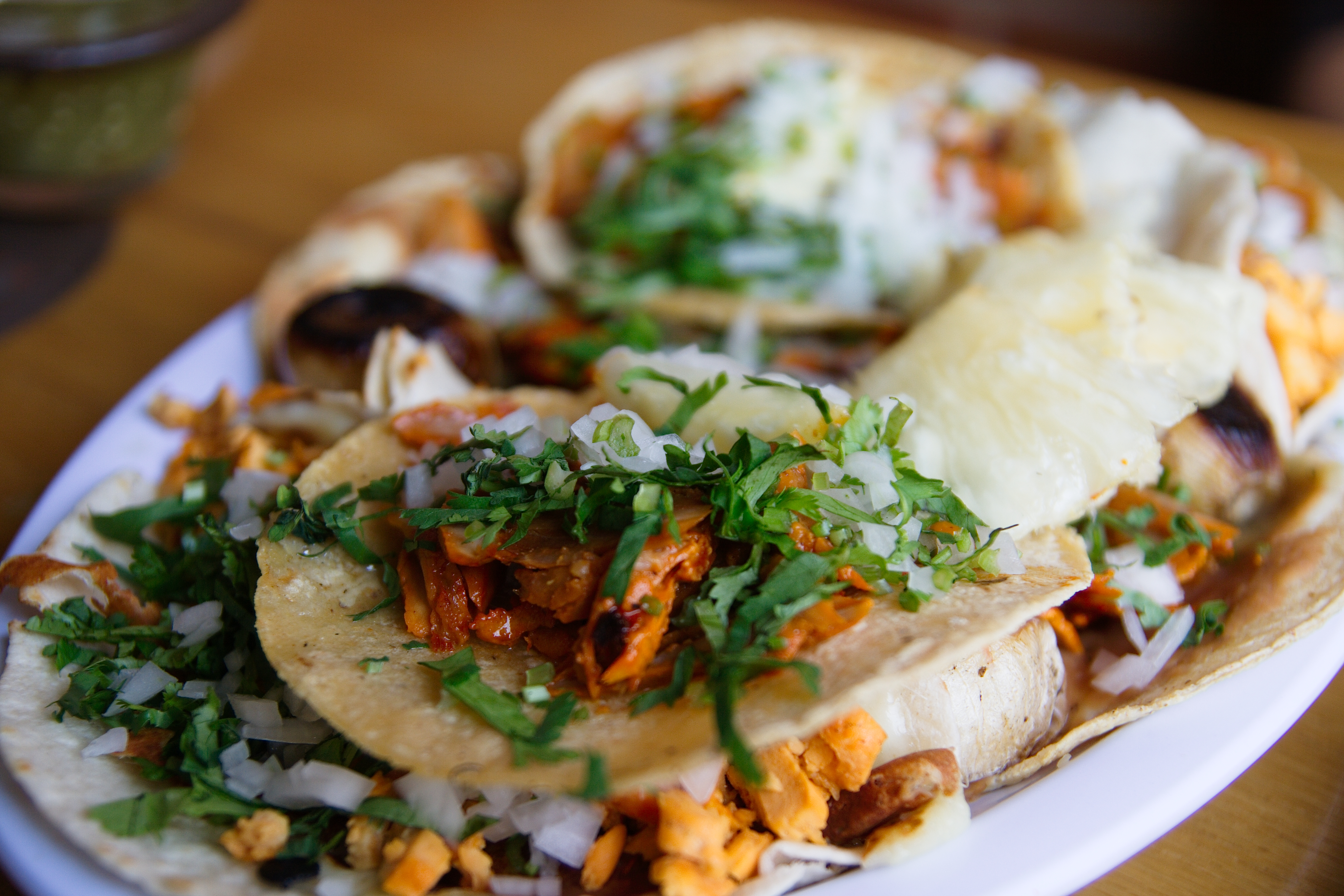
Plate of tacos al pastor

In some places of northern Mexico, such as Nuevo León, Durango and Chihuahua, these are usually called tacos de trompo if served on corn tortillas, and gringas if they are served with cheese on flour tortillas.

A similar dish is called tacos árabes (lit. 'Arab tacos'), which originated in Puebla in the 1930s from Arab-Mexican cuisine. Tacos árabes use shawarma-style meat carved from a spit, but are served in a pita-style bread called pan árabe (lit. 'Arab bread'). These tacos have been brought by Mexican immigrants to the United States in the past few years and have become popular in cities such as Chicago and Los Angeles, two of the largest Mexican/Mexican-American population centers in the United States.

A chicken version marinated in the al pastor style was brought back to the Middle East in the early 2000s, and sold as "shawarma mexici". It is typically served in the Middle Eastern style, wrapped with garlic mayonnaise, dill pickle, and french fries in a thin flatbread.

== See also ==
- Dürüm
- List of Mexican dishes
- List of spit-roasted foods
- Sandwich
