= Melon with ham =

European dish

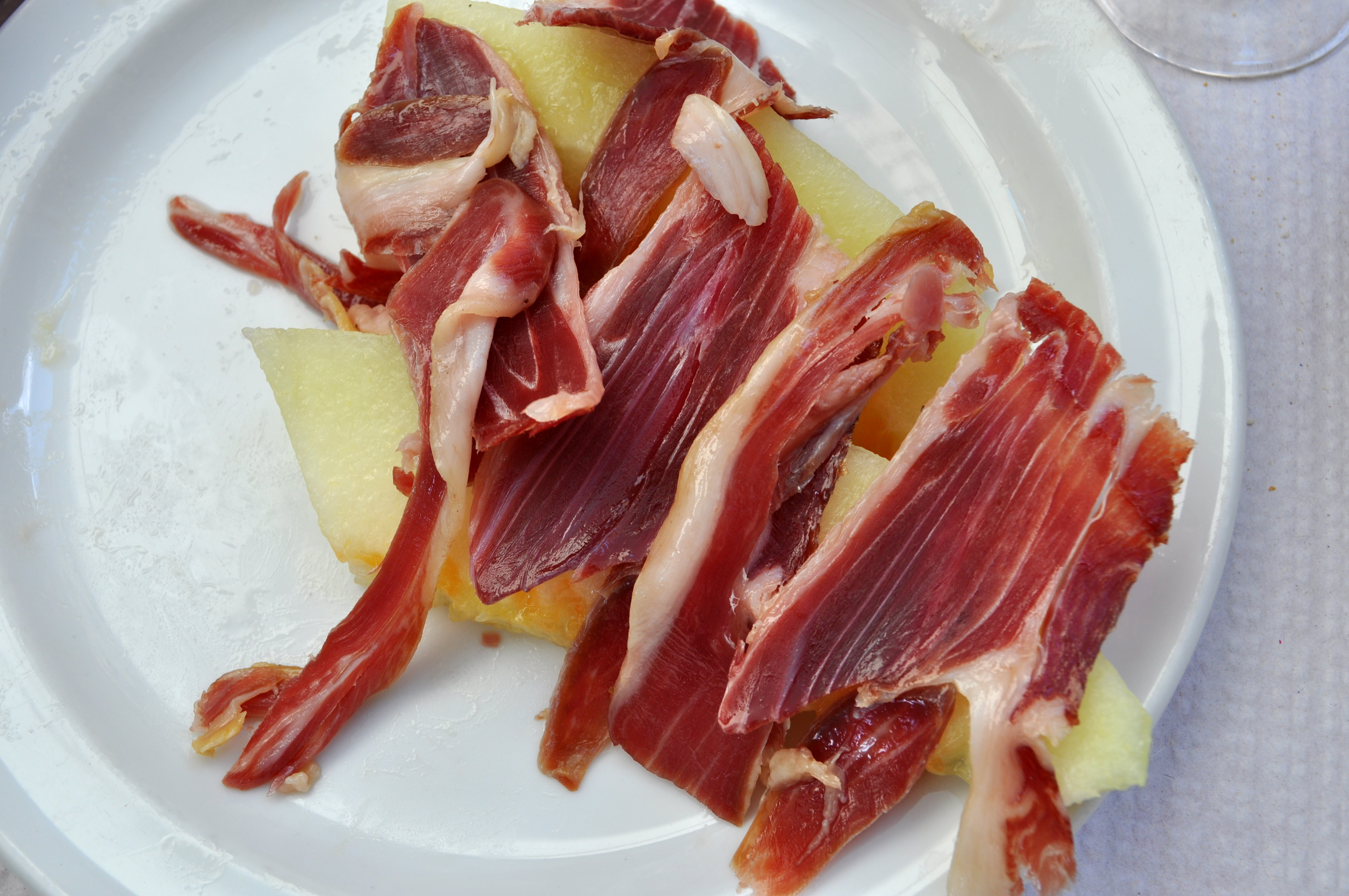

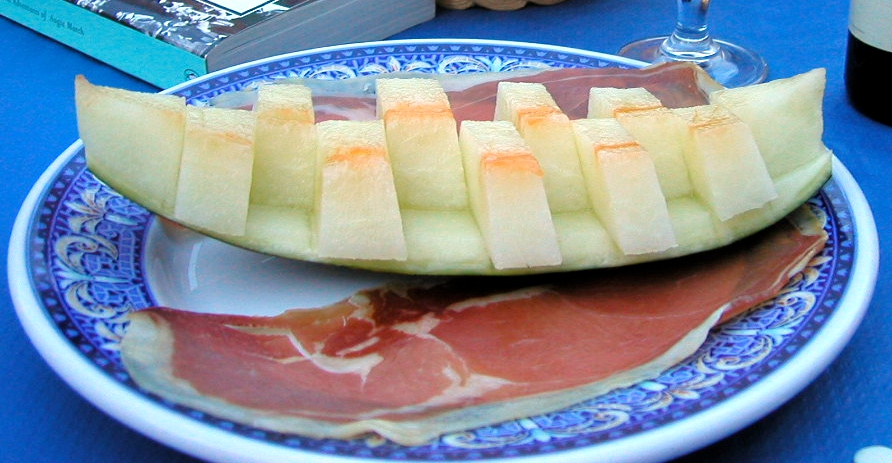
Plate with the melon presented in pieces

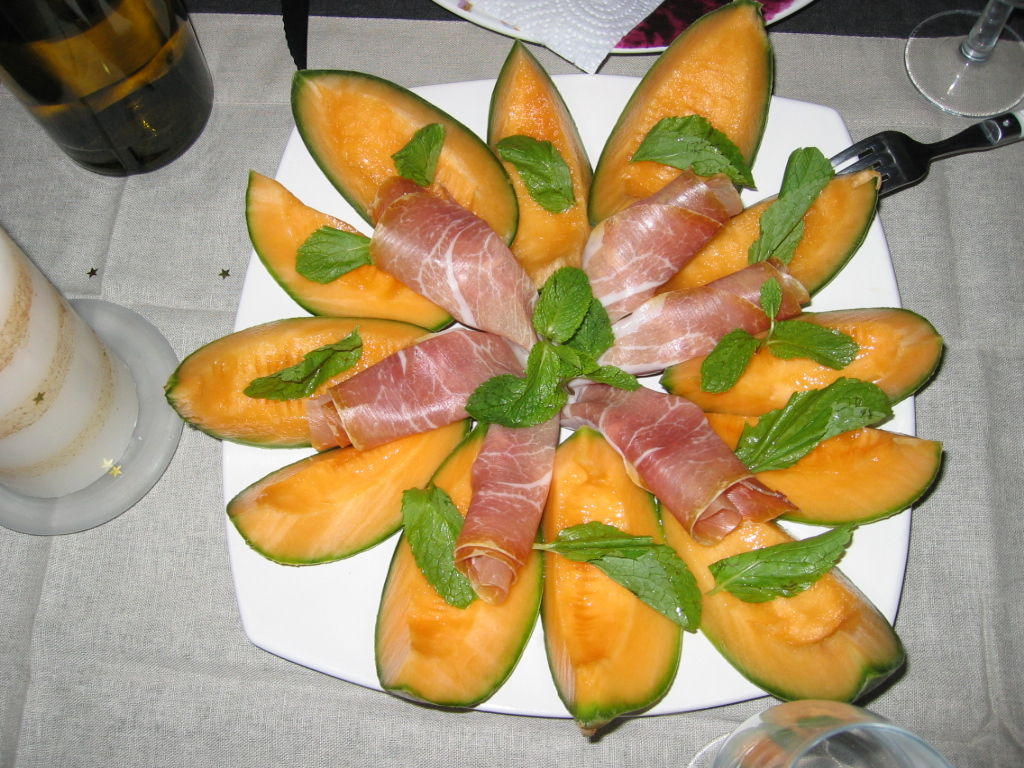

Melon with ham, or melon and ham (Spanish: melón con jamón; Italian: prosciutto e melone; French: melon au jambon) is a specialty of many countries in Europe including Spanish, Italian, and French cuisine, and is usually served during the spring and summer months.

The main ingredients are melon and slices of ham (preferably serrano ham, prosciutto crudo, Bayonne ham, or Westphalian ham). The delicacy of this dish lies in the combination of the sweet flavor of the melon with the salty contribution of the ham. It may be accompanied by a sweet wine or even by cava.

Its preparation involves a few ingredients, but many people have introduced different variations in its serving method.

== Similar dishes ==
- Cypriot cuisine, the meze includes halloumi and lounza, a combination of melon, ham, and a salty cheese.
- German cuisine, although not exactly the same, the sweet-and-salty combination appears in the dish known as Birnen, Bohnen und Speck, typical of Lower Saxony cuisine
