= List of Diners, Drive-Ins and Dives episodes =

This is a list of all Diners, Drive-Ins and Dives episodes.

== Series overview ==
| Season | Episodes | Originally released | |
| Season | Episodes | First released | Last released |
|---|---|---|---|
| 1 | 12 | April 23, 2007 | July 30, 2007 |
| 2 | 13 | October 1, 2007 | January 28, 2008 |
| 3 | 13 | March 10, 2008 | July 7, 2008 |
| 4 | 13 | July 14, 2008 | November 10, 2008 |
| 5 | 13 | November 10, 2008 | March 23, 2009 |
| 6 | 13 | April 6, 2009 | July 27, 2009 |
| 7 | 13 | August 3, 2009 | November 16, 2009 |
| 8 | 11 | November 23, 2009 | April 5, 2010 |
| 9 | 13 | April 27, 2010 | August 9, 2010 |
| 10 | 13 | August 30, 2010 | December 18, 2010 |
| 11 | 13 | January 3, 2011 | April 11, 2011 |
| 12 | 13 | May 9, 2011 | November 21, 2011 |
| 13 | 13 | November 28, 2011 | March 5, 2012 |
| 14 | 13 | April 2, 2012 | July 30, 2012 |
| 15 | 13 | August 5, 2012 | November 12, 2012 |
| 16 | 13 | December 10, 2012 | March 25, 2013 |
| 17 | 13 | April 22, 2013 | August 19, 2013 |
| 18 | 13 | August 26, 2013 | December 30, 2013 |
| 19 | 15 | February 7, 2014 | June 21, 2014 |
| 20 | 5 | September 5, 2014 | October 3, 2014 |
| 21 | 18 | September 5, 2014 | December 26, 2014 |
| 22 | 15 | January 16, 2015 | March 9, 2015 |
| 23 | 18 | July 17, 2015 | December 11, 2015 |
| 24 | 16 | January 1, 2016 | June 17, 2016 |
| 25 | 13 | July 1, 2016 | December 23, 2016 |
| 26 | 16 | January 6, 2017 | June 30, 2017 |
| 27 | 15 | July 7, 2017 | January 5, 2018 |
| 28 | 19 | December 22, 2017 | September 7, 2018 |
| 29 | 20 | September 21, 2018 | May 10, 2019 |
| 30 | 19 | January 11, 2019 | November 22, 2019 |
| 31 | 13 | November 29, 2019 | July 10, 2020 |
| 32 | 13 | December 27, 2019 | November 13, 2020 |
| 33 | 13 | August 7, 2020 | April 16, 2021 |
| 34 | 18 | November 20, 2020 | January 28, 2022 |
| 35 | 17 | December 17, 2021 | August 26, 2022 |
| 36 | 12 | September 9, 2022 | February 17, 2023 |
| 37 | 12 | March 3, 2023 | August 25, 2023 |
| 38 | 16 | September 1, 2023 | February 23, 2024 |
| 39 | 8 | December 29, 2023 | January 17, 2025 |
| 40 | 15 | August 2, 2024 | February 14, 2025 |
| 41 | 12 | December 27, 2024 | June 20, 2025 |
| 42 | 12 | July 11, 2025 | May 22, 2026 |
| 43 | 12 | January 23, 2026 | September 11, 2026 |
| 44 | TBA | October 2, 2026 | 2027 |

== Episodes ==
=== Season 1 (2007) ===
| Total | Episode | Title | Restaurant | Location | Original Air Date |
|---|---|---|---|---|---|
| 1 | 1 | Classics | Mac & Ernie's Roadside Eatery | Tarpley, Texas | April 23, 2007 |
| 1 | 1 | Classics | Brint's Diner | Wichita, Kansas | April 23, 2007 |
| 1 | 1 | Classics | Mad Greek Cafe | Baker, California | April 23, 2007 |
| 2 | 2 | That's Italian | Pizza Palace | Knoxville, Tennessee | April 30, 2007 |
| 2 | 2 | That's Italian | Hullabaloo Diner | Wellborn, Texas | April 30, 2007 |
| 2 | 2 | That's Italian | Four Kegs Sports Pub | Las Vegas, Nevada | April 30, 2007 |
| 3 | 3 | Blue Plate Special | Patrick's Roadhouse | Santa Monica, California | May 7, 2007 |
| 3 | 3 | Blue Plate Special | Frosted Mug | Alsip, Illinois | May 7, 2007 |
| 3 | 3 | Blue Plate Special | The Penguin | Charlotte, North Carolina | May 7, 2007 |
| 4 | 4 | Breakfast | Franks Diner | Kenosha, Wisconsin | May 21, 2007 |
| 4 | 4 | Breakfast | Gaffey Street Diner | San Pedro, California | May 21, 2007 |
| 4 | 4 | Breakfast | The Coffee Cup | Boulder City, Nevada | May 21, 2007 |
| 5 | 5 | BBQ | Baby Blues BBQ | Venice, Los Angeles, California | May 28, 2007 |
| 5 | 5 | BBQ | Louie Mueller BBQ | Taylor, Texas | May 28, 2007 |
| 5 | 5 | BBQ | Barbecue King Drive-In | Charlotte, North Carolina | May 28, 2007 |
| 6 | 6 | Local Legends | A1 Diner | Gardiner, Maine | June 4, 2007 |
| 6 | 6 | Local Legends | Leo's BBQ | Oklahoma City, Oklahoma | June 4, 2007 |
| 6 | 6 | Local Legends | Eveready Diner | Hyde Park, New York | June 4, 2007 |
| 7 | 7 | Burgers | Squeeze Inn | Sacramento, California | June 11, 2007 |
| 7 | 7 | Burgers | Hackney's | Glenview, Illinois | June 11, 2007 |
| 7 | 7 | Burgers | Triple XXX Restaurant | West Lafayette, Indiana | June 11, 2007 |
| 8 | 8 | House Specials | Voula's Offshore Cafe | Seattle, Washington | June 18, 2007 |
| 8 | 8 | House Specials | Hank's Creekside Restaurant | Santa Rosa, California | June 18, 2007 |
| 8 | 8 | House Specials | Red Arrow Diner | Manchester, New Hampshire | June 18, 2007 |
| 9 | 9 | Retro | Byways Cafe | Portland, Oregon | July 9, 2007 |
| 9 | 9 | Retro | South Side Soda Shop and Diner | Goshen, Indiana | July 9, 2007 |
| 9 | 9 | Retro | Taylor's Automatic Refresher | St. Helena, California | July 9, 2007 |
| 10 | 10 | Worth the Trip | Mo Gridder's BBQ | The Bronx, New York City, New York | July 16, 2007 |
| 10 | 10 | Worth the Trip | Big Star Diner | Bainbridge Island, Washington | July 16, 2007 |
| 10 | 10 | Worth the Trip | Harold's Café | Gaffney, South Carolina | July 16, 2007 |
| 11 | 11 | Diners A-Plenty | Kelly's Diner | Somerville, Massachusetts | July 23, 2007 |
| 11 | 11 | Diners A-Plenty | Bay Way Diner | Linden, New Jersey | July 23, 2007 |
| 11 | 11 | Diners A-Plenty | Beacon Drive-In | Spartanburg, South Carolina | July 23, 2007 |
| 12 | 12 | American Cookin' | Rosie's Diner | Rockford, Michigan | July 30, 2007 |
| 12 | 12 | American Cookin' | Russian River Pub | Forestville, California | July 30, 2007 |
| 12 | 12 | American Cookin' | Al's Breakfast | Minneapolis, Minnesota | July 30, 2007 |
| 12 | 12 | American Cookin' | Dari-ette Drive-In | St. Paul, Minnesota | July 30, 2007 |

=== Season 2 (2007–08) ===
| Total | Episode | Title | Restaurant | Location | Original Air Date |
|---|---|---|---|---|---|
| 13 | 1 | Totally Fried | Silk City Diner | Philadelphia, Pennsylvania | October 1, 2007 |
| 13 | 1 | Totally Fried | Falafel's Drive-In | San Jose, California | October 1, 2007 |
| 13 | 1 | Totally Fried | Ramona Café | Ramona, California | October 1, 2007 |
| 14 | 2 | Route 66 | Emma Jean's Holland Burger Café | Victorville, California | October 8, 2007 |
| 14 | 2 | Route 66 | The Rock Café | Stroud, Oklahoma | October 8, 2007 |
| 14 | 2 | Route 66 | Café on the Route | Baxter Springs, Kansas | October 8, 2007 |
| 15 | 3 | Seaside Eats | Evelyn's Drive-In | Tiverton, Rhode Island | October 15, 2007 |
| 15 | 3 | Seaside Eats | Hodad's | Ocean Beach, San Diego, California | October 15, 2007 |
| 15 | 3 | Seaside Eats | Keegan's Seafood Grille | Indian Rocks Beach, Florida | October 15, 2007 |
| 16 | 4 | Local Flavor | Mike's Chili Parlor | Seattle, Washington | October 22, 2007 |
| 16 | 4 | Local Flavor | Clanton's Café | Vinita, Oklahoma | October 22, 2007 |
| 16 | 4 | Local Flavor | Duarte's Tavern | Pescadero, California | October 22, 2007 |
| 17 | 5 | Viewer's Choice | Ted Peters Famous Smoked Fish | South Pasadena, Florida | October 29, 2007 |
| 17 | 5 | Viewer's Choice | Bobby's Hawaiian Style Restaurant | Everett, Washington | October 29, 2007 |
| 17 | 5 | Viewer's Choice | Psycho Suzie's Motor Lounge (Closed) | Minneapolis, Minnesota | October 29, 2007 |
| 18 | 6 | Real Deal BBQ | Jay Bee's Bar-B-Que | Gardena, California | November 5, 2007 |
| 18 | 6 | Real Deal BBQ | Smoque | Chicago, Illinois | November 5, 2007 |
| 18 | 6 | Real Deal BBQ | BBQ Shack | Paola, Kansas | November 5, 2007 |
| 19 | 7 | Talkin' Turkey | Mike's City Diner | Boston, Massachusetts | November 10, 2007 |
| 19 | 7 | Talkin' Turkey | Willie Bird's Restaurant | Santa Rosa, California | November 10, 2007 |
| 19 | 7 | Talkin' Turkey | Alpine Steakhouse | Sarasota, Florida | November 10, 2007 |
| 20 | 8 | One of a Kind | JT Farnham's Seafood & Grill | Essex, Massachusetts | November 19, 2007 |
| 20 | 8 | One of a Kind | Joe's Gizzard City | Potterville, Michigan | November 19, 2007 |
| 20 | 8 | One of a Kind | Grubstake Diner | San Francisco, California | November 19, 2007 |
| 20 | 8 | One of a Kind | Los Tapatios | San Jose, California | November 19, 2007 |
| 21 | 9 | Family Owned | Paradise Pup | Des Plaines, Illinois | November 23, 2007 |
| 21 | 9 | Family Owned | Charlie's Diner | Spencer, Massachusetts | November 23, 2007 |
| 21 | 9 | Family Owned | El Indio | San Diego, California | November 23, 2007 |
| 22 | 10 | Open 24/7 | Studio Diner | San Diego, California | January 7, 2008 |
| 22 | 10 | Open 24/7 | White Palace Grill | Chicago, Illinois | January 7, 2008 |
| 22 | 10 | Open 24/7 | The Dining Car | Philadelphia, Pennsylvania | January 7, 2008 |
| 23 | 11 | Off the Hook Specials | Grinders Pizza | Kansas City, Missouri | January 14, 2008 |
| 23 | 11 | Off the Hook Specials | Schooner or Later | Long Beach, California | January 14, 2008 |
| 23 | 11 | Off the Hook Specials | The Fly Trap | Ferndale, Michigan | January 14, 2008 |
| 23 | 11 | Off the Hook Specials | Galewood Cook Shack | Chicago, Illinois | January 14, 2008 |
| 24 | 12 | Burgers, Rings and Fries | The Nook | St. Paul, Minnesota | January 21, 2008 |
| 24 | 12 | Burgers, Rings and Fries | Joe's Cable Car Restaurant | San Francisco, California | January 21, 2008 |
| 24 | 12 | Burgers, Rings and Fries | Krazy Jim's Blimpy Burger | Ann Arbor, Michigan | January 21, 2008 |
| 25 | 13 | The New Jersey Diner Tour | Mustache Bill's Diner | Barnegat Light, New Jersey | January 28, 2008 |
| 25 | 13 | The New Jersey Diner Tour | Hightstown Diner | Hightstown, New Jersey | January 28, 2008 |
| 25 | 13 | The New Jersey Diner Tour | White Manna Hamburgers | Hackensack, New Jersey | January 28, 2008 |
| 25 | 13 | The New Jersey Diner Tour | Jefferson Diner | Lake Hopatcong, New Jersey | January 28, 2008 |
| 25 | 13 | The New Jersey Diner Tour | Tick Tock Diner | Clifton, New Jersey | January 28, 2008 |
| 25 | 13 | The New Jersey Diner Tour | The Ritz Diner | Livingston, New Jersey | January 28, 2008 |
| 25 | 13 | The New Jersey Diner Tour | Skylark Diner | Edison, New Jersey | January 28, 2008 |

=== Season 3 (2008) ===
| Total | Episode | Title | Restaurant | Location | Original Air Date |
|---|---|---|---|---|---|
| 26 | 1 | Big Breakfast | Mama's 39th Street Diner | Kansas City, Missouri | March 10, 2008 |
| 26 | 1 | Big Breakfast | Matt's Big Breakfast | Phoenix, Arizona | March 10, 2008 |
| 26 | 1 | Big Breakfast | Brownstone Diner | Jersey City, New Jersey | March 10, 2008 |
| 27 | 2 | Like Mama Made | Sweetie Pie's | St. Louis, Missouri | March 17, 2008 |
| 27 | 2 | Like Mama Made | Roberto's Mexican Food | Phoenix, Arizona | March 17, 2008 |
| 27 | 2 | Like Mama Made | Smokey Valley Truck Stop | Olive Hill, Kentucky | March 17, 2008 |
| 28 | 3 | Regional Favorites | Charlie Parker's | Springfield, Illinois | March 24, 2008 |
| 28 | 3 | Regional Favorites | Virginia Diner | Wakefield, Virginia | March 24, 2008 |
| 28 | 3 | Regional Favorites | Tecolote Café | Santa Fe, New Mexico | March 24, 2008 |
| 29 | 4 | Neighborhood Joints | Iron Barley | St. Louis, Missouri | March 31, 2008 |
| 29 | 4 | Neighborhood Joints | The Village Café | Richmond, Virginia | March 31, 2008 |
| 29 | 4 | Neighborhood Joints | Thee Pitts Again | Glendale, Arizona | March 31, 2008 |
| 29 | 4 | Neighborhood Joints | Daddypops | Hatboro, Pennsylvania | March 31, 2008 |
| 30 | 5 | A World of Flavors | Chino Bandido | Phoenix, Arizona | April 7, 2008 |
| 30 | 5 | A World of Flavors | Marietta Diner | Marietta, Georgia | April 7, 2008 |
| 30 | 5 | A World of Flavors | YJ's Snack Bar | Kansas City, Missouri | April 7, 2008 |
| 31 | 6 | Something Different | Hillbilly Hot Dogs | Lesage, West Virginia | April 14, 2008 |
| 31 | 6 | Something Different | Dot's Back Inn | Richmond, Virginia | April 14, 2008 |
| 31 | 6 | Something Different | Scully's Tavern | Miami, Florida | April 14, 2008 |
| 32 | 7 | American Classics | 11th Street Diner | Miami Beach, Florida | May 12, 2008 |
| 32 | 7 | American Classics | Little Tea Shop | Memphis, Tennessee | May 12, 2008 |
| 32 | 7 | American Classics | Bobo Drive-In | Topeka, Kansas | May 12, 2008 |
| 33 | 8 | Real Deal Fast Food | Panini Pete's | Fairhope, Alabama | May 19, 2008 |
| 33 | 8 | Real Deal Fast Food | Maria's Taco Express | Austin, Texas | May 19, 2008 |
| 33 | 8 | Real Deal Fast Food | Joe's Farm Grill | Gilbert, Arizona | May 19, 2008 |
| 34 | 9 | The Memphis BBQ Tour | Leonard's BBQ | Memphis, Tennessee | May 26, 2008 |
| 34 | 9 | The Memphis BBQ Tour | Tom's Bar-B-Q | Memphis, Tennessee | May 26, 2008 |
| 34 | 9 | The Memphis BBQ Tour | Marlowe's Ribs | Memphis, Tennessee | May 26, 2008 |
| 34 | 9 | The Memphis BBQ Tour | Cozy Corner | Memphis, Tennessee | May 26, 2008 |
| 35 | 10 | Comfort Food | Blue Moon Café | Baltimore, Maryland | June 15, 2008 |
| 35 | 10 | Comfort Food | Tip Top Café | San Antonio, Texas | June 15, 2008 |
| 35 | 10 | Comfort Food | Grampa's Bakery & Restaurant | Dania Beach, Florida | June 15, 2008 |
| 35 | 10 | Comfort Food | Central City Cafe | Huntington, West Virginia | June 15, 2008 |
| 36 | 11 | Where The Locals Go | Matthews Cafeteria | Tucker, Georgia | June 23, 2008 |
| 36 | 11 | Where The Locals Go | Monte Carlo Steak House | Albuquerque, New Mexico | June 23, 2008 |
| 36 | 11 | Where The Locals Go | The Rivershack Tavern | Jefferson, Louisiana | June 23, 2008 |
| 37 | 12 | In the Family | Chaps Pit Beef | Baltimore, Maryland | June 30, 2008 |
| 37 | 12 | In the Family | Benny's Seafood Restaurant | South Miami, Florida | June 30, 2008 |
| 37 | 12 | In the Family | Burger Bar | Roy, Utah | June 30, 2008 |
| 38 | 13 | All Kinds of BBQ | Texas Pride BBQ | Adkins, Texas | July 7, 2008 |
| 38 | 13 | All Kinds of BBQ | The Joint | New Orleans, Louisiana | July 7, 2008 |
| 38 | 13 | All Kinds of BBQ | The Shed | Ocean Springs, Mississippi | July 7, 2008 |

=== Season 4 (2008) ===
| Total | Episode | Title | Restaurant | Location | Original Air Date |
|---|---|---|---|---|---|
| 39 | 1 | Diners You Sent Me To | Town Talk Diner | Minneapolis, Minnesota | July 14, 2008 |
| 39 | 1 | Diners You Sent Me To | Broadway Diner | Baltimore, Maryland | July 14, 2008 |
| 39 | 1 | Diners You Sent Me To | Blue Plate Diner | Salt Lake City, Utah | July 14, 2008 |
| 40 | 2 | Bar Food | The Highlander | Atlanta, Georgia | July 21, 2008 |
| 40 | 2 | Bar Food | Starlite Lounge | Blawnox, Pennsylvania | July 21, 2008 |
| 40 | 2 | Bar Food | Gumbo Shack | Fairhope, Alabama | July 21, 2008 |
| 41 | 3 | Burgers and Dogs | G&A Restaurant | Baltimore, Maryland | July 28, 2008 |
| 41 | 3 | Burgers and Dogs | Casino El Camino | Austin, Texas | July 28, 2008 |
| 41 | 3 | Burgers and Dogs | The Wienery | Minneapolis, Minnesota | July 28, 2008 |
| 42 | 4 | Where the Locals Eat | Captain Chuck A Mucks | Rescue, Virginia | August 4, 2008 |
| 42 | 4 | Where the Locals Eat | Uncle Lou's | Memphis, Tennessee | August 4, 2008 |
| 42 | 4 | Where the Locals Eat | Dixie Quicks | Omaha, Nebraska | August 4, 2008 |
| 43 | 5 | Brain Freeze | Aunt Lena's Creamery | Chandler, Arizona | August 11, 2008 |
| 43 | 5 | Brain Freeze | Doumar's | Norfolk, Virginia | August 11, 2008 |
| 43 | 5 | Brain Freeze | The Creole Creamery | New Orleans, Louisiana | August 11, 2008 |
| 44 | 6 | Totally Unexpected | The Cove | San Antonio, Texas | August 18, 2008 |
| 44 | 6 | Totally Unexpected | Bryant-Lake Bowl | Minneapolis, Minnesota | August 18, 2008 |
| 44 | 6 | Totally Unexpected | Cabbage Town Market | Atlanta, Georgia | August 18, 2008 |
| 45 | 7 | A Taste of Everywhere | Jamaica Kitchen | Kendale Lakes, Florida | September 15, 2008 |
| 45 | 7 | A Taste of Everywhere | Crystal Restaurant | Pittsburgh, Pennsylvania | September 15, 2008 |
| 45 | 7 | A Taste of Everywhere | Red Iguana | Salt Lake City, Utah | September 15, 2008 |
| 46 | 8 | Better Than Ever | Colonnade | Atlanta, Georgia | September 22, 2008 |
| 46 | 8 | Better Than Ever | Manci's Antique Club | Daphne, Alabama | September 22, 2008 |
| 46 | 8 | Better Than Ever | Amato's | Omaha, Nebraska | September 22, 2008 |
| 47 | 9 | Big Flavor | Brick Oven Pizza | Baltimore, Maryland | September 29, 2008 |
| 47 | 9 | Big Flavor | Victor's 1959 Café | Minneapolis, Minnesota | September 29, 2008 |
| 47 | 9 | Big Flavor | Darwell's Café | Long Beach, Mississippi | September 29, 2008 |
| 48 | 10 | Cookin' It Old School | Nadine's Restaurant | Pittsburgh, Pennsylvania | October 6, 2008 |
| 48 | 10 | Cookin' It Old School | Casamento's Restaurant | New Orleans, Louisiana | October 6, 2008 |
| 48 | 10 | Cookin' It Old School | Big Mama's Kitchen & Catering | Omaha, Nebraska | October 6, 2008 |
| 49 | 11 | Grabbin' a Sandwich | Moochie's Meatballs & More | Salt Lake City, Utah | October 13, 2008 |
| 49 | 11 | Grabbin' a Sandwich | Tioli's Crazee Burger | San Diego, California | October 13, 2008 |
| 49 | 11 | Grabbin' a Sandwich | Cemitas Puebla | Chicago, Illinois | October 13, 2008 |
| 50 | 12 | Traditional Dishes | Stoney Creek Inn | Baltimore, Maryland | November 3, 2008 |
| 50 | 12 | Traditional Dishes | Alcenia's | Memphis, Tennessee | November 3, 2008 |
| 50 | 12 | Traditional Dishes | Donatelli's | White Bear Lake, Minnesota | November 3, 2008 |
| 51 | 13 | Doin' Their Own Thing | Lone Star Taqueria | Salt Lake City, Utah | November 10, 2008 |
| 51 | 13 | Doin' Their Own Thing | Modern Café | Minneapolis, Minnesota | November 10, 2008 |
| 51 | 13 | Doin' Their Own Thing | Brewburger's | Omaha, Nebraska | November 10, 2008 |

=== Season 5 (2008–09) ===
| Total | Episode | Title | Restaurant | Location | Original Air Date |
|---|---|---|---|---|---|
| 52 | 1 | What's For Breakfast | Surrey's Café | New Orleans, Louisiana | November 10, 2008 |
| 52 | 1 | What's For Breakfast | Harry's Roadhouse | Santa Fe, New Mexico | November 10, 2008 |
| 52 | 1 | What's For Breakfast | Dor-Stop Restaurant | Pittsburgh, Pennsylvania | November 10, 2008 |
| 53 | 2 | Real Deal Italian | LoBello's Spaghetti House | Coraopolis, Pennsylvania | November 17, 2008 |
| 53 | 2 | Real Deal Italian | Di Pasquale's | Baltimore, Maryland | November 17, 2008 |
| 53 | 2 | Real Deal Italian | Pizzeria Luigi | San Diego, California | November 17, 2008 |
| 54 | 3 | Not What You'd Expect | Sophia's Place | Albuquerque, New Mexico | November 24, 2008 |
| 54 | 3 | Not What You'd Expect | Magnolia Cafe | Austin, Texas | November 24, 2008 |
| 54 | 3 | Not What You'd Expect | Glenn's Diner | Chicago, Illinois | November 24, 2008 |
| 55 | 4 | Places You Sent Me | Ruth's Diner | Salt Lake City, Utah | December 1, 2008 |
| 55 | 4 | Places You Sent Me | O'Rourke's Diner | Middletown, Connecticut | December 1, 2008 |
| 55 | 4 | Places You Sent Me | Parasol's | New Orleans, Louisiana | December 1, 2008 |
| 56 | 5 | Long Time Legends | Tommy's Joynt | San Francisco, California | January 5, 2009 |
| 56 | 5 | Long Time Legends | Joe Tess Place | Omaha, Nebraska | January 5, 2009 |
| 56 | 5 | Long Time Legends | Big Jim's | Pittsburgh, Pennsylvania | January 5, 2009 |
| 57 | 6 | Something from Everywhere | Valencia Luncheria | Norwalk, Connecticut | January 12, 2009 |
| 57 | 6 | Something from Everywhere | The Original Vito & Nick's Pizzeria | Chicago, Illinois | January 12, 2009 |
| 57 | 6 | Something from Everywhere | Emily's Lebanese Delicatessen | Minneapolis, Minnesota | January 12, 2009 |
| 58 | 7 | Neighborhood Favorites | Pat's BBQ | Salt Lake City, Utah | January 19, 2009 |
| 58 | 7 | Neighborhood Favorites | Blow Fly Inn | Gulfport, Mississippi | January 19, 2009 |
| 58 | 7 | Neighborhood Favorites | Tune-Up Café | Santa Fe, New Mexico | January 19, 2009 |
| 59 | 8 | Just Like Yesterday | Hob Nob Hill | San Diego, California | January 26, 2009 |
| 59 | 8 | Just Like Yesterday | The Silver Skillet | Atlanta, Georgia | January 26, 2009 |
| 59 | 8 | Just Like Yesterday | Tufano's Vernon Park Tap | Chicago, Illinois | January 26, 2009 |
| 60 | 9 | Return to Route 66 | Standard Diner | Albuquerque, New Mexico | February 2, 2009 |
| 60 | 9 | Return to Route 66 | Dell Rhea's Chicken Basket | Willowbrook, Illinois | February 2, 2009 |
| 60 | 9 | Return to Route 66 | Salsa Brava | Flagstaff, Arizona | February 2, 2009 |
| 61 | 10 | BBQ & More | Green Mesquite | Austin, Texas | February 9, 2009 |
| 61 | 10 | BBQ & More | Gorilla BBQ | Pacifica, California | February 9, 2009 |
| 61 | 10 | BBQ & More | Wilson's Holy Smoke BBQ | Fairfield, Connecticut | February 9, 2009 |
| 62 | 11 | Regional Classics | Cecilia's Café | Albuquerque, New Mexico | February 16, 2009 |
| 62 | 11 | Regional Classics | Joey K's Restaurant & Bar | New Orleans, Louisiana | February 16, 2009 |
| 62 | 11 | Regional Classics | Kelly O's Diner | Pittsburgh, Pennsylvania | February 16, 2009 |
| 63 | 12 | All Kinds of Fast Food | Super Duper Weenie | Fairfield, Connecticut | March 16, 2009 |
| 63 | 12 | All Kinds of Fast Food | California Tacos | Omaha, Nebraska | March 16, 2009 |
| 63 | 12 | All Kinds of Fast Food | Bert's Burger Bowl | Santa Fe, New Mexico | March 16, 2009 |
| 64 | 13 | Family Favorites | Giusti's | Walnut Grove, California | March 23, 2009 |
| 64 | 13 | Family Favorites | Haus Murphy's | Glendale, Arizona | March 23, 2009 |
| 64 | 13 | Family Favorites | Louie's | Dallas, Texas | March 23, 2009 |

=== Season 6 (2009) ===
| Total | Episode | Title | Restaurant | Location | Original Air Date |
|---|---|---|---|---|---|
| 65 | 1 | Funky Joints | Bizzaro Café | Seattle, Washington | April 6, 2009 |
| 65 | 1 | Funky Joints | Chef Point Café | Watauga, Texas | April 6, 2009 |
| 65 | 1 | Funky Joints | Jamie's Bar & Grill | Sacramento, California | April 6, 2009 |
| 66 | 2 | Their Own Way | Bluewater Seafood Market & Grill | San Diego, California | April 13, 2009 |
| 66 | 2 | Their Own Way | Brandy's Restaurant & Bakery | Flagstaff, Arizona | April 13, 2009 |
| 66 | 2 | Their Own Way | Kuma's Corner | Chicago, Illinois | April 13, 2009 |
| 67 | 3 | A Little Bit of Everywhere | Bar Gernika | Boise, Idaho | April 20, 2009 |
| 67 | 3 | A Little Bit of Everywhere | Café Rolle | Sacramento, California | April 20, 2009 |
| 67 | 3 | A Little Bit of Everywhere | Havana Hideout (CLOSED) | Lake Worth, Florida | April 20, 2009 |
| 68 | 4 | A Burger, A Bowl and a Slice | La Piazza Al Forno | Glendale, Arizona | April 27, 2009 |
| 68 | 4 | A Burger, A Bowl and a Slice | Slim's Last Chance Chili Shack & Watering Hole | Seattle, Washington | April 27, 2009 |
| 68 | 4 | A Burger, A Bowl and a Slice | Twisted Root Burger Co. | Dallas, Texas | April 27, 2009 |
| 69 | 5 | Biscuits, Bagels and BLTs | Arleta Library Bakery & Cafe | Portland, Oregon | May 4, 2009 |
| 69 | 5 | Biscuits, Bagels and BLTs | Bubba's Diner | San Anselmo, California | May 4, 2009 |
| 69 | 5 | Biscuits, Bagels and BLTs | Flakowitz of Boynton Bakery & Deli Restaurant | Boynton Beach, Florida | May 4, 2009 |
| 70 | 6 | Who'Da Thunk It | Backroad Pizza | Santa Fe, New Mexico | May 11, 2009 |
| 70 | 6 | Who'Da Thunk It | Jamaica Gates Caribbean Cuisine | Arlington, Texas | May 11, 2009 |
| 70 | 6 | Who'Da Thunk It | Chef Lou's Westside Drive-In | Boise, Idaho | May 11, 2009 |
| 71 | 7 | Go-To Joints | Black Duck Café | Westport, Connecticut | May 25, 2009 |
| 71 | 7 | Go-To Joints | Otto's Sausage Kitchen | Portland, Oregon | May 25, 2009 |
| 71 | 7 | Go-To Joints | Sol Food Puerto Rican Cuisine | San Rafael, California | May 25, 2009 |
| 72 | 8 | Homestyle | Giuseppe's Restaurant | Phoenix, Arizona | June 1, 2009 |
| 72 | 8 | Homestyle | Southern Kitchen Restaurant | Tacoma, Washington | June 1, 2009 |
| 72 | 8 | Homestyle | Zia Diner & Angel Food Catering | Santa Fe, New Mexico | June 1, 2009 |
| 73 | 9 | All Kinds of Classics | Blue Marlin Fish House Restaurant | North Miami Beach, Florida | June 8, 2009 |
| 73 | 9 | All Kinds of Classics | Fred's Texas Café | Fort Worth, Texas | June 8, 2009 |
| 73 | 9 | All Kinds of Classics | Pine State Biscuits | Portland, Oregon | June 8, 2009 |
| 74 | 10 | All Over The Map | Georgia's Greek Restaurant & Deli | Seattle, Washington | June 15, 2009 |
| 74 | 10 | All Over The Map | Los Tacquitos Grill | Phoenix, Arizona | June 15, 2009 |
| 74 | 10 | All Over The Map | Rocco's Café | San Francisco, California | June 15, 2009 |
| 75 | 11 | Old Time Favorites | Blueplate Lunch Counter and Soda Fountain | Portland, Oregon | June 22, 2009 |
| 75 | 11 | Old Time Favorites | Don's Hilltop Kodiak Grill | Boise, Idaho | June 22, 2009 |
| 75 | 11 | Old Time Favorites | La Camoronera Restaurant & Fish Market | Miami, Florida | June 22, 2009 |
| 76 | 12 | Comfort Cookin' | Dottie's True Blue Café | San Francisco, California | June 29, 2009 |
| 76 | 12 | Comfort Cookin' | Over Easy | Phoenix, Arizona | June 29, 2009 |
| 76 | 12 | Comfort Cookin' | Comet Café | Milwaukee, Wisconsin | June 29, 2009 |
| 77 | 13 | Mama's Cookin' | Polka Restaurant & Catering (Closed) | Los Angeles, California | July 27, 2009 |
| 77 | 13 | Mama's Cookin' | Avila's Café | Dallas, Texas | July 27, 2009 |
| 77 | 13 | Mama's Cookin' | Mama E's | Oklahoma City, Oklahoma | July 27, 2009 |

=== Season 7 (2009) ===
| Total | Episode | Title | Restaurant | Location | Original Air Date |
|---|---|---|---|---|---|
| 78 | 1 | Upper Crust | Bunk Sandwiches | Portland, Oregon | August 3, 2009 |
| 78 | 1 | Upper Crust | Sonny's Famous Steak Hogies | Hollywood, Florida | August 3, 2009 |
| 78 | 1 | Upper Crust | The Depot American Diner (Closed) | Chicago, Illinois | August 3, 2009 |
| 79 | 2 | Burgers, Tacos & Dogs | Lankford Grocery | Houston, Texas | August 10, 2009 |
| 79 | 2 | Burgers, Tacos & Dogs | Fab Hot Dogs | Reseda, California | August 10, 2009 |
| 79 | 2 | Burgers, Tacos & Dogs | Cempazuchi (Closed) | Milwaukee, Wisconsin | August 10, 2009 |
| 80 | 3 | Name That Cook | Rick's Press Room & Grill (Closed) | Meridian, Idaho | August 17, 2009 |
| 80 | 3 | Name That Cook | Nic's Grill | Oklahoma City, Oklahoma | August 17, 2009 |
| 80 | 3 | Name That Cook | Pam's Kitchen | Seattle, Washington | August 17, 2009 |
| 81 | 4 | Global Grub | Prince Lebanese Grill | Arlington, Texas | August 24, 2009 |
| 81 | 4 | Global Grub | Tre Kronor | Chicago, Illinois | August 24, 2009 |
| 81 | 4 | Global Grub | La Texanita | Santa Rosa, California | August 24, 2009 |
| 82 | 5 | Only At This Joint | Podnah's Pit Barbecue | Portland, Oregon | August 31, 2009 |
| 82 | 5 | Only At This Joint | Donnie Mac's Trailer Park Cuisine (Closed) | Boise, Idaho | August 31, 2009 |
| 82 | 5 | Only At This Joint | Whale's Rib | Deerfield Beach, Florida | August 31, 2009 |
| 83 | 6 | You Picked ‘Em | Eischen's Bar & Grill | Okarche, Oklahoma | September 7, 2009 |
| 83 | 6 | You Picked ‘Em | Mom's Tamales (Closed) | Los Angeles, California | September 7, 2009 |
| 83 | 6 | You Picked ‘Em | Kenny & Ziggy's | Houston, Texas | September 7, 2009 |
| 84 | 7 | You Can Say That Again | Tap Tap Haitian Restaurant | Miami Beach, Florida | October 5, 2009 |
| 84 | 7 | You Can Say That Again | Pok Pok (Closed) | Portland, Oregon | October 5, 2009 |
| 84 | 7 | You Can Say That Again | Niko Niko's | Houston, Texas | October 5, 2009 |
| 85 | 8 | Barbequed, Baked & Brined | Honky Tonk BBQ | Chicago, Illinois | October 12, 2009 |
| 85 | 8 | Barbequed, Baked & Brined | Pizzalchik (Closed) | Boise, Idaho | October 12, 2009 |
| 85 | 8 | Barbequed, Baked & Brined | Lucky's Café | Cleveland, Ohio | October 12, 2009 |
| 86 | 9 | Blast from the Past | Cattlemen's Steakhouse | Oklahoma City, Oklahoma | October 19, 2009 |
| 86 | 9 | Blast from the Past | Sam LaGrassa's | Boston, Massachusetts | October 19, 2009 |
| 86 | 9 | Blast from the Past | Nickel Diner (Closed) | Los Angeles, California | October 19, 2009 |
| 87 | 10 | Dives Worth a Drive | Parkview Nightclub | Cleveland, Ohio | October 26, 2009 |
| 87 | 10 | Dives Worth a Drive | The Shanty | Wadsworth, Illinois | October 26, 2009 |
| 87 | 10 | Dives Worth a Drive | Grover's Bar & Grill | East Amherst, New York | October 26, 2009 |
| 88 | 11 | Family Style | Louis Family Restaurant | Providence, Rhode Island | November 2, 2009 |
| 88 | 11 | Family Style | Café Pita+ | Houston, Texas | November 2, 2009 |
| 88 | 11 | Family Style | Mambos Café | Glendale, California | November 2, 2009 |
| 89 | 12 | Diners Times Three | The Little Depot Diner | Peabody, Massachusetts | November 9, 2009 |
| 89 | 12 | Diners Times Three | Santa Cruz Diner | Santa Cruz, California | November 9, 2009 |
| 89 | 12 | Diners Times Three | The Diner | Norman, Oklahoma | November 9, 2009 |
| 90 | 13 | Legacies | Lake Effect Diner | Buffalo, New York | November 16, 2009 |
| 90 | 13 | Legacies | Geraci's Restaurant | Cleveland, Ohio | November 16, 2009 |
| 90 | 13 | Legacies | Morin's Hometown Bar & Grill | Attleboro, Massachusetts | November 16, 2009 |

=== Season 8 (2009–10) ===
| Total | Episode | Title | Restaurant | Location | Original Air Date |
|---|---|---|---|---|---|
| 91 | 1 | Burgers, Steaks & Chops | Mr. Bartley's Gourmet Burgers | Cambridge, Massachusetts | November 23, 2009 |
| 91 | 1 | Burgers, Steaks & Chops | Tee Off Bar & Grill (Closed) | San Francisco, California | November 23, 2009 |
| 91 | 1 | Burgers, Steaks & Chops | T-Bone Tom's Steakhouse | Kemah, Texas | November 23, 2009 |
| 92 | 2 | Pizza, Pork & Paprikash | Q Restaurant (Closed) | San Francisco, California | January 11, 2010 |
| 92 | 2 | Pizza, Pork & Paprikash | Sterle's Slovenian Country House (Closed) | Cleveland, Ohio | January 11, 2010 |
| 92 | 2 | Pizza, Pork & Paprikash | Pizza Junction (Closed) | North Tonawanda, New York | January 11, 2010 |
| 93 | 3 | Stacked, Stuffed & Loaded | Crazy Burger Café & Juice Bar | Narragansett, Rhode Island | January 18, 2010 |
| 93 | 3 | Stacked, Stuffed & Loaded | The Oinkster | Eagle Rock, California | January 18, 2010 |
| 93 | 3 | Stacked, Stuffed & Loaded | Bob's Taco Station | Rosenberg, Texas | January 18, 2010 |
| 94 | 4 | Triple D Goes Tailgatin' | 900 Grayson Restaurant | Berkeley, California | January 25, 2010 |
| 94 | 4 | Triple D Goes Tailgatin' | Rudy's Can't Fail Cafe | Emeryville, California | January 25, 2010 |
| 94 | 4 | Triple D Goes Tailgatin' | Rick & Ann's Restaurant | Berkeley, California | January 25, 2010 |
| 95 | 5 | Home And Away | Taste of Peru | Chicago, Illinois | February 1, 2010 |
| 95 | 5 | Home And Away | Ingrid's Kitchen (Closed) | Oklahoma City, Oklahoma | February 1, 2010 |
| 95 | 5 | Home And Away | Blackthorn Restaurant & Pub | Buffalo, New York | February 1, 2010 |
| 96 | 6 | By Request | Melt Bar & Grilled | Lakewood, Ohio | February 8, 2010 |
| 96 | 6 | By Request | South 21 Drive-In | Charlotte, North Carolina | February 8, 2010 |
| 96 | 6 | By Request | Red Lion Pub & Restaurant | Houston, Texas | February 8, 2010 |
| 97 | 7 | And The Kicker Is... | Pawley's Front Porch | Columbia, South Carolina | February 15, 2010 |
| 97 | 7 | And The Kicker Is... | Sophia's Restaurant | Buffalo, New York | February 15, 2010 |
| 97 | 7 | And The Kicker Is... | Bette's Oceanview Diner | Berkeley, California | February 15, 2010 |
| 98 | 8 | Comfort Food Classics | Naglee Park Garage | San Jose, California | February 22, 2010 |
| 98 | 8 | Comfort Food Classics | Dish | Charlotte, North Carolina | February 22, 2010 |
| 98 | 8 | Comfort Food Classics | The Liberty Elm Diner (Closed) | Providence, Rhode Island | February 22, 2010 |
| 99 | 9 | Twists And Traditions | Momocho | Cleveland, Ohio | March 22, 2010 |
| 99 | 9 | Twists And Traditions | Aldo's Harbor Restaurant | Santa Cruz, California | March 22, 2010 |
| 99 | 9 | Twists And Traditions | Earl's Drive-In (Closed) | Chaffee, New York | March 22, 2010 |
| 100 | 10 | Fresh And Funky | Landmark Restaurant | Charlotte, North Carolina | March 29, 2010 |
| 100 | 10 | Fresh And Funky | Dish Café & Catering (Closed) | Reno, Nevada | March 29, 2010 |
| 100 | 10 | Fresh And Funky | Pier 23 Café | San Francisco, California | March 29, 2010 |
| 101 | 11 | Triple D Goes Hawaiian | Highway Inn & Ho'okipa Catering | Waipahu, Hawaii | April 5, 2010 |
| 101 | 11 | Triple D Goes Hawaiian | Nico's Pier 38 | Honolulu, Hawaii | April 5, 2010 |
| 101 | 11 | Triple D Goes Hawaiian | Hank's Haute Dogs | Honolulu, Hawaii | April 5, 2010 |
| 101 | 11 | Triple D Goes Hawaiian | Germaine's Luau | Kapolei, Hawaii | April 5, 2010 |

=== Season 9 (2010) ===
| Total | Episode | Title | Restaurant | Location | Original Air Date |
|---|---|---|---|---|---|
| 102 | 1 | Surf ‘n Turf | North End Caffé | Manhattan Beach, California | April 27, 2010 |
| 102 | 1 | Surf ‘n Turf | Gold ‘N Silver Inn | Reno, Nevada | April 27, 2010 |
| 102 | 1 | Surf ‘n Turf | Singleton's Seafood Shack | Atlantic Beach, Florida | April 27, 2010 |
| 103 | 2 | Homegrown & Homemade | The Farmer's Shed (Closed) | Lexington, South Carolina | May 3, 2010 |
| 103 | 2 | Homegrown & Homemade | Poke Stop at Mililana Mauka Llc. | Mililani, Hawaii | May 3, 2010 |
| 103 | 2 | Homegrown & Homemade | Mulberry Café | Lackawanna, New York | May 3, 2010 |
| 104 | 3 | Globetrottin' | Louis' Basque Corner | Reno, Nevada | May 10, 2010 |
| 104 | 3 | Globetrottin' | 13 Gypsies | Jacksonville, Florida | May 10, 2010 |
| 104 | 3 | Globetrottin' | Gloria's Café | Los Angeles, California | May 10, 2010 |
| 105 | 4 | Bringin' It Home | Café Citti (New location in Santa Rosa) | Kenwood, California | May 17, 2010 |
| 105 | 4 | Bringin' It Home | Cabo Fish Taco | Charlotte, North Carolina | May 17, 2010 |
| 105 | 4 | Bringin' It Home | Murphy's Bar & Grill | Honolulu, Hawaii | May 17, 2010 |
| 106 | 5 | Porkapalooza | At Last Café (Closed) | Long Beach, California | May 24, 2010 |
| 106 | 5 | Porkapalooza | Virgil's Café (Closed) | Bellevue, Kentucky | May 24, 2010 |
| 106 | 5 | Porkapalooza | Martin's Bar-B-Que Joint | Nolensville, Tennessee | May 24, 2010 |
| 107 | 6 | Grilled, Smoked & Sauced | Terry's Turf Club | Cincinnati, Ohio | May 31, 2010 |
| 107 | 6 | Grilled, Smoked & Sauced | Schellville Grille (Closed) | Sonoma, California | May 31, 2010 |
| 107 | 6 | Grilled, Smoked & Sauced | Jake's Good Eats | Charlotte, North Carolina | May 31, 2010 |
| 108 | 7 | Comfort Food With Attitude | Jax At The Trax | Truckee, California | June 7, 2010 |
| 108 | 7 | Comfort Food With Attitude | Culhane's Irish Pub | Atlantic Beach, Florida | June 7, 2010 |
| 108 | 7 | Comfort Food With Attitude | Blue Ash Chili Restaurant | Cincinnati, Ohio | June 7, 2010 |
| 109 | 8 | Fast Food Their Way | Don Chow Tacos (Closed) | Los Angeles, California | June 21, 2010 |
| 109 | 8 | Fast Food Their Way | Rainbow Drive-In | Honolulu, Hawaii | June 21, 2010 |
| 109 | 8 | Fast Food Their Way | Northern Waters Smokehaus | Duluth, Minnesota | June 21, 2010 |
| 110 | 9 | Farm To Table | Blackwater Grill (Closed) | St. Simons Island, Georgia | June 28, 2010 |
| 110 | 9 | Farm To Table | Comet Ping Pong | Washington, D.C. | June 28, 2010 |
| 110 | 9 | Farm To Table | Wallace Station | Versailles, Kentucky | June 28, 2010 |
| 111 | 10 | Kansas City Barbeque Tour | Smokin' Guns BBQ | North Kansas City, Missouri | July 12, 2010 |
| 111 | 10 | Kansas City Barbeque Tour | RJ's Bob-Be-Que Shack | Mission, Kansas | July 12, 2010 |
| 111 | 10 | Kansas City Barbeque Tour | Johnny's Bar-B-Q (Closed) | Mission, Kansas | July 12, 2010 |
| 111 | 10 | Kansas City Barbeque Tour | Woodyard Bar-B-Que | Kansas City, Kansas | July 12, 2010 |
| 112 | 11 | Burgers ‘n More | Swagger Fine Spirits & Food (Closed) | Kansas City, Missouri | July 19, 2010 |
| 112 | 11 | Burgers ‘n More | Burger Me! | Truckee, California | July 19, 2010 |
| 112 | 11 | Burgers ‘n More | Athens Family Restaurant | Nashville, Tennessee | July 19, 2010 |
| 113 | 12 | You Called It | Paul's Coffee Shop | Fountain Valley, California | July 26, 2010 |
| 113 | 12 | You Called It | Rick's White Light Diner | Frankfort, Kentucky | July 26, 2010 |
| 113 | 12 | You Called It | Gordy's Hi-Hat | Cloquet, Minnesota | July 26, 2010 |
| 114 | 13 | Old Time Attitude | Arnold's Country Kitchen | Nashville, Tennessee | August 9, 2010 |
| 114 | 13 | Old Time Attitude | Southern Soul Barbeque | St. Simons Island, Georgia | August 9, 2010 |
| 114 | 13 | Old Time Attitude | Maine Diner | Wells, Maine | August 9, 2010 |

=== Season 10 (2010) ===
| Total | Episode | Title | Restaurant | Location | Original Air Date |
|---|---|---|---|---|---|
| 115 | 1 | Family Joints | Kramarczuk's | Minneapolis, Minnesota | August 30, 2010 |
| 115 | 1 | Family Joints | Happy Gillis Café & Hangout | Kansas City, Missouri | August 30, 2010 |
| 115 | 1 | Family Joints | Hillbilly Hot Dogs | Lesage, West Virginia | August 30, 2010 |
| 116 | 2 | Tried and True | Mama Cozza's | Anaheim, California | September 9, 2010 |
| 116 | 2 | Tried and True | Tune Inn Restaurant | Washington, D.C. | September 9, 2010 |
| 116 | 2 | Tried and True | Bob's Clam Hut | Kittery, Maine | September 9, 2010 |
| 117 | 3 | Timeless | Greek Corner Restaurant | Cambridge, Massachusetts | September 13, 2010 |
| 117 | 3 | Timeless | Bro's Cajun Cuisine (Closed) | Nashville, Tennessee | September 13, 2010 |
| 117 | 3 | Timeless | The General Store (Closed) | Silver Spring, Maryland | September 13, 2010 |
| 118 | 4 | You Found ‘Em | Parkette Drive In (Closed) | Lexington, Kentucky | September 20, 2010 |
| 118 | 4 | You Found ‘Em | Metro Diner | Jacksonville, Florida | September 20, 2010 |
| 118 | 4 | You Found ‘Em | Al's Breakfast | Minneapolis, Minnesota | September 20, 2010 |
| 119 | 5 | Wings, Dogs and Claws | The Lobster Shanty | Salem, Massachusetts | September 27, 2010 |
| 119 | 5 | Wings, Dogs and Claws | The Brick | Kansas City, Missouri | September 27, 2010 |
| 119 | 5 | Wings, Dogs and Claws | Oohh's & Aahh's Gourmet Deli | Washington, D.C. | September 27, 2010 |
| 120 | 6 | Sauced and Spiced | J.J. McBrewster's (Closed) | Lexington, Kentucky | October 4, 2010 |
| 120 | 6 | Sauced and Spiced | At Sara's Table Chester Creek Café | Duluth, Minnesota | October 4, 2010 |
| 120 | 6 | Sauced and Spiced | Café Rakka | Hendersonville, Tennessee | October 4, 2010 |
| 121 | 7 | Made to Order | Rino's Place | East Boston, Massachusetts | October 25, 2010 |
| 121 | 7 | Made to Order | The Blue Door Pub (New Location) | St. Paul, Minnesota | October 25, 2010 |
| 121 | 7 | Made to Order | Bay Way Diner | Linden, New Jersey | October 25, 2010 |
| 122 | 8 | Fresh, Filled and Fried | Chaps Diner & Bakery | Spokane, Washington | November 1, 2010 |
| 122 | 8 | Fresh, Filled and Fried | Good Dog Bar & Restaurant | Philadelphia, Pennsylvania | November 1, 2010 |
| 122 | 8 | Fresh, Filled and Fried | Porthole Restaurant | Portland, Maine | November 1, 2010 |
| 123 | 9 | Gone Global | LaCaraquena (Closed) | Falls Church, Virginia | November 8, 2010 |
| 123 | 9 | Gone Global | Savarino's Cucina (Closed) | Nashville, Tennessee | November 8, 2010 |
| 123 | 9 | Gone Global | Brats Brothers (Closed) | Sherman Oaks, California | November 8, 2010 |
| 124 | 10 | A Triple D Thanksgiving | George's Place | Cape May, New Jersey | November 15, 2010 |
| 124 | 10 | A Triple D Thanksgiving | Becky's Diner | Portland, Maine | November 15, 2010 |
| 124 | 10 | A Triple D Thanksgiving | Sammy's Food Service & Deli | New Orleans, Louisiana | November 15, 2010 |
| 125 | 11 | Sweet ‘n Savory | Meal Ticket (Closed) | Berkeley, California | November 26, 2010 |
| 125 | 11 | Sweet ‘n Savory | Metro 29 Diner | Arlington, Virginia | November 26, 2010 |
| 125 | 11 | Sweet ‘n Savory | Duluth Grill | Duluth, Minnesota | November 26, 2010 |
| 126 | 12 | Wings ‘n Things | 10th Avenue Burrito | Belmar, New Jersey | December 13, 2010 |
| 126 | 12 | Wings ‘n Things | Capone's Pub | Coeur d'Alene, Idaho | December 13, 2010 |
| 126 | 12 | Wings ‘n Things | Jamaicaway | Nashville, Tennessee | December 13, 2010 |
| 127 | 13 | Sandwiches Plus | Elk Public House | Spokane, Washington | December 18, 2010 |
| 127 | 13 | Sandwiches Plus | Colossal Café (New Location) | Minneapolis, Minnesota | December 18, 2010 |
| 127 | 13 | Sandwiches Plus | Maui's Dog House | Wildwood, New Jersey | December 18, 2010 |

=== Season 11 (2011) ===
| Total | Episode | Title | Restaurant | Location | Original Air Date |
|---|---|---|---|---|---|
| 128 | 1 | Pub, Grub and More | Tortilla Café | Washington, D.C. | January 3, 2011 |
| 128 | 1 | Pub, Grub and More | Memphis Taproom (Closed) | Philadelphia, Pennsylvania | January 3, 2011 |
| 128 | 1 | Pub, Grub and More | The Golden Bear | Sacramento, California | January 3, 2011 |
| 129 | 2 | Po' Boys, Pasta & Pork | Mahoney's Po-Boy Shop | New Orleans, Louisiana | January 10, 2011 |
| 129 | 2 | Po' Boys, Pasta & Pork | Hill's Restaurant & Lounge (Closed) | Spokane, Washington | January 10, 2011 |
| 129 | 2 | Po' Boys, Pasta & Pork | Q Fanatic BBQ | Champlin, Minnesota | January 10, 2011 |
| 130 | 3 | Funky Finds | Sage General Store (Closed) | Queens, New York City, New York | January 17, 2011 |
| 130 | 3 | Funky Finds | Quahog's Seafood Shack | Stone Harbor, New Jersey | January 17, 2011 |
| 130 | 3 | Funky Finds | W.O.W. – Worth Our Weight (Closed) | Santa Rosa, California | January 17, 2011 |
| 131 | 4 | Quirky Classics | Louie & The Red Head Lady (Closed) | Mandeville, Louisiana | January 24, 2011 |
| 131 | 4 | Quirky Classics | Honey's Sit-N-Eat | Philadelphia, Pennsylvania | January 24, 2011 |
| 131 | 4 | Quirky Classics | Picabu Neighborhood Bistro (Closed) | Spokane, Washington | January 24, 2011 |
| 132 | 5 | A Little Twisted | The Pit Stop | Merrick, New York | January 31, 2011 |
| 132 | 5 | A Little Twisted | Gatsby's Diner (Closed) | Sacramento, California | January 31, 2011 |
| 132 | 5 | A Little Twisted | Anchor Bar | Superior, Wisconsin | January 31, 2011 |
| 133 | 6 | Signature Sandwiches | La Pines Café | Slidell, Louisiana | February 7, 2011 |
| 133 | 6 | Signature Sandwiches | Steuben's Food Service | Denver, Colorado | February 7, 2011 |
| 133 | 6 | Signature Sandwiches | 3 Sisters Café (Closed) | Indianapolis, Indiana | February 7, 2011 |
| 134 | 7 | Favorites With A Twist | Jimmy's Down the Street | Coeur d'Alene, Idaho | February 28, 2011 |
| 134 | 7 | Favorites With A Twist | Aunt Mary's Café (Closed) | Oakland, California | February 28, 2011 |
| 134 | 7 | Favorites With A Twist | Corey's Catsup & Mustard (Closed) | Manchester, Connecticut | February 28, 2011 |
| 135 | 8 | Soup & Sandwiches | Pineville Tavern | Pineville, Pennsylvania | March 7, 2011 |
| 135 | 8 | Soup & Sandwiches | Indy's Historic Steer-In Restaurant | Indianapolis, Indiana | March 7, 2011 |
| 135 | 8 | Soup & Sandwiches | Dad's Kitchen | Sacramento, California | March 7, 2011 |
| 136 | 9 | From Crepes to Kreplach | Ben's Best Deli | Queens, New York City, New York | March 14, 2011 |
| 136 | 9 | From Crepes to Kreplach | Foolish Craig's Café | Boulder, Colorado | March 14, 2011 |
| 136 | 9 | From Crepes to Kreplach | Waddell's Pub & Grille | Spokane, Washington | March 14, 2011 |
| 137 | 10 | Fully Loaded | Katie's Restaurant | New Orleans, Louisiana | March 21, 2011 |
| 137 | 10 | Fully Loaded | Jersey Café (Closed) | Carmel, Indiana | March 21, 2011 |
| 137 | 10 | Fully Loaded | Merritt Canteen Inc. | Bridgeport, Connecticut | March 21, 2011 |
| 138 | 11 | From Mozz to Matzo Balls | Sunflower Caffé | Sonoma, California | March 28, 2011 |
| 138 | 11 | From Mozz to Matzo Balls | Hildebrandt's | Williston Park, New York | March 28, 2011 |
| 138 | 11 | From Mozz to Matzo Balls | The Bagel Delicatessen & Restaurant | Denver, Colorado | March 28, 2011 |
| 139 | 12 | Signature Twists | The Barking Dog (Closed) | Indianapolis, Indiana | April 4, 2011 |
| 139 | 12 | Signature Twists | Putah Creek Café (Closed) | Winters, California | April 4, 2011 |
| 139 | 12 | Signature Twists | The Old Coffee Pot Restaurant (Closed) | New Orleans, Louisiana | April 4, 2011 |
| 140 | 13 | Porktastic | Jimtown Store | Healdsburg, California | April 11, 2011 |
| 140 | 13 | Porktastic | Dough Pizzeria Napoletana | San Antonio, Texas | April 11, 2011 |
| 140 | 13 | Porktastic | Sam's No. 3 | Denver, Colorado | April 11, 2011 |

=== Season 12 (2011) ===
| Total | Episode | Title | Restaurant | Location | Original Air Date |
|---|---|---|---|---|---|
| 141 | 1 | Bar Food and Bon Bons | The Sparrow Tavern | Queens, New York City, New York | May 9, 2011 |
| 141 | 1 | Bar Food and Bon Bons | Catelli's | Geyserville, California | May 9, 2011 |
| 141 | 1 | Bar Food and Bon Bons | Zest (Closed) | Indianapolis, Indiana | May 9, 2011 |
| 142 | 2 | From Kraut to Couscous | Lauer-Krauts | Brighton, Colorado | May 16, 2011 |
| 142 | 2 | From Kraut to Couscous | Moroccan Bites | San Antonio, Texas | May 16, 2011 |
| 142 | 2 | From Kraut to Couscous | California Tacos To Go (Closed) | Tampa, Florida | May 16, 2011 |
| 143 | 3 | You Can Only Get It Here | HRD Coffee Shop (Closed) | San Francisco, California | May 23, 2011 |
| 143 | 3 | You Can Only Get It Here | The Tamale Place | Indianapolis, Indiana | May 23, 2011 |
| 143 | 3 | You Can Only Get It Here | Garifuna Flava | Chicago, Illinois | May 23, 2011 |
| 144 | 4 | Grillin' and Smokin' | Bun ‘N Barrel | San Antonio, Texas | September 12, 2011 |
| 144 | 4 | Grillin' and Smokin' | Tocabe American Indian Eatery | Denver, Colorado | September 12, 2011 |
| 144 | 4 | Grillin' and Smokin' | Munch's Restaurant & Sundries (Closed) | St. Petersburg, Florida | September 12, 2011 |
| 145 | 5 | Southern Flavor | Broken Record (Closed) | San Francisco, California | September 19, 2011 |
| 145 | 5 | Southern Flavor | Bang! (Closed) | Denver, Colorado | September 19, 2011 |
| 145 | 5 | Southern Flavor | Jose's Real Cuban Food (Closed) | Bradenton, Florida | September 19, 2011 |
| 146 | 6 | Gettin' Fresh | The Sink | Boulder, Colorado | September 26, 2011 |
| 146 | 6 | Gettin' Fresh | Nana Organic (Closed) | Chicago, Illinois | September 26, 2011 |
| 146 | 6 | Gettin' Fresh | Get Fresh Café (Closed) | Norfolk, Virginia | September 26, 2011 |
| 147 | 7 | Homemade & Homebrewed | Tampa Bay Brewing Co. | Tampa, Florida | October 3, 2011 |
| 147 | 7 | Homemade & Homebrewed | Zydeco's | Mooresville, Indiana | October 3, 2011 |
| 147 | 7 | Homemade & Homebrewed | Chilam Balam | Chicago, Illinois | October 3, 2011 |
| 148 | 8 | Latin Street Food | Irazu | Chicago, Illinois | October 10, 2011 |
| 148 | 8 | Latin Street Food | Beto's Comida Latina (Closed) | San Antonio, Texas | October 10, 2011 |
| 148 | 8 | Latin Street Food | Tortilleria Nixtamal (Closed) | Queens, New York City, New York | October 10, 2011 |
| 149 | 9 | Slammin' Sammies | Taco Taco Mexican Restaurant | San Antonio, Texas | October 17, 2011 |
| 149 | 9 | Slammin' Sammies | Whitner's Barbeque (Closed) | Virginia Beach, Virginia | October 17, 2011 |
| 149 | 9 | Slammin' Sammies | DMK Burger Bar | Chicago, Illinois | October 17, 2011 |
| 150 | 10 | Global Comfort | Rigoletto Italian Bakery & Café | Virginia Beach, Virginia | October 24, 2011 |
| 150 | 10 | Global Comfort | Chuck's Southern Comforts Café | Burbank, Illinois | October 24, 2011 |
| 150 | 10 | Global Comfort | El Bohio (Closed) | San Antonio, Texas | October 24, 2011 |
| 151 | 11 | Breakfast, Lunch & Dinner | Magnolia Pancake Haus (New Locations) | San Antonio, Texas | October 31, 2011 |
| 151 | 11 | Breakfast, Lunch & Dinner | Taco Bus | Tampa, Florida | October 31, 2011 |
| 151 | 11 | Breakfast, Lunch & Dinner | Beach Pub | Virginia Beach, Virginia | October 31, 2011 |
| 152 | 12 | Pizza, Pancakes & Pork | Supino Pizzeria | Detroit, Michigan | November 7, 2011 |
| 152 | 12 | Pizza, Pancakes & Pork | Big & Littles (Closed) | Chicago, Illinois | November 7, 2011 |
| 152 | 12 | Pizza, Pancakes & Pork | Citrus Breakfast & Lunch | Virginia Beach, Virginia | November 7, 2011 |
| 153 | 13 | Old to New | Polish Village Café | Hamtramck, Michigan | November 21, 2011 |
| 153 | 13 | Old to New | Leaping Lizards Café | Virginia Beach, Virginia | November 21, 2011 |
| 153 | 13 | Old to New | Jethro's Fine Grub (Closed) | Vancouver, British Columbia, Canada | November 21, 2011 |

=== Season 13 (2011–12) ===
| Total | Episode | Title | Restaurant | Location | Original Air Date |
|---|---|---|---|---|---|
| 154 | 1 | Seafood & Sammies | Fresh Local Wild (Closed) | Vancouver, British Columbia, Canada | November 28, 2011 |
| 154 | 1 | Seafood & Sammies | Traffic Jam & Snug (Closed) | Detroit, Michigan | November 28, 2011 |
| 154 | 1 | Seafood & Sammies | Panozzo's Italian Market (Closed) | Chicago, Illinois | November 28, 2011 |
| 155 | 2 | Coast to Coast Classics | Tomahawk Restaurant | North Vancouver, British Columbia, Canada | December 5, 2011 |
| 155 | 2 | Coast to Coast Classics | Danny's All American Diner (Closed) | Tampa, Florida | December 5, 2011 |
| 156 | 3 | Kid Rock's Detroit Tour | Clarkston Union Bar & Kitchen | Clarkston, Michigan | December 12, 2011 |
| 156 | 3 | Kid Rock's Detroit Tour | Union Woodshop | Clarkston, Michigan | December 12, 2011 |
| 156 | 3 | Kid Rock's Detroit Tour | Michigan Brewing Co. (Closed) | Webberville, Michigan | December 12, 2011 |
| 157 | 4 | Southern Staples | Red Wagon Café | Vancouver, British Columbia, Canada | December 19, 2011 |
| 157 | 4 | Southern Staples | Perfectly Frank's (Closed) | Summerville, South Carolina | December 19, 2011 |
| 157 | 4 | Southern Staples | Mama's Food Shop (Closed) | Manhattan, New York City, New York | December 19, 2011 |
| 158 | 5 | Scratch Made Classics | Lito's Mexican Restaurant | Santa Barbara, California | December 26, 2011 |
| 158 | 5 | Scratch Made Classics | Save On Meats (Closed) | Vancouver, British Columbia, Canada | December 26, 2011 |
| 158 | 5 | Scratch Made Classics | The Redhead (Closed) | Manhattan, New York City, New York | December 26, 2011 |
| 159 | 6 | Meat Madness | Rincon Criollo | Queens, New York City, New York | January 16, 2012 |
| 159 | 6 | Meat Madness | Tattooed Moose | Charleston, South Carolina | January 16, 2012 |
| 159 | 6 | Meat Madness | Falconetti's (Closed) | Vancouver, British Columbia, Canada | January 16, 2012 |
| 160 | 7 | Global Traditions | John's of 12th Street | Manhattan, New York City, New York | January 23, 2012 |
| 160 | 7 | Global Traditions | Mac's Fish & Chip Shop (Closed) | Santa Barbara, California | January 23, 2012 |
| 161 | 8 | Multitaskers | The Early Bird Diner | Charleston, South Carolina | January 30, 2012 |
| 161 | 8 | Multitaskers | Boulevard Diner | Dundalk, Maryland | January 30, 2012 |
| 161 | 8 | Multitaskers | The Kitchen (Closed) | Oxnard, California | January 30, 2012 |
| 162 | 9 | Family Matters | Sidecar (New Location) | Brooklyn, New York City, New York | February 6, 2012 |
| 162 | 9 | Family Matters | Peaceful Restaurant | Vancouver, British Columbia, Canada | February 6, 2012 |
| 162 | 9 | Family Matters | Flip Flops Grill & Chill | Virginia Beach, Virginia | February 6, 2012 |
| 163 | 10 | Old Faves, New Craves | Norton's Pastrami & Deli | Santa Barbara, California | February 13, 2012 |
| 163 | 10 | Old Faves, New Craves | Meat & Bread | Vancouver, British Columbia, Canada | February 13, 2012 |
| 163 | 10 | Old Faves, New Craves | Fuel Cantina | Charleston, South Carolina | February 13, 2012 |
| 164 | 11 | Long Standing Legacies | Defonte's Sandwich Shop | Brooklyn, New York City, New York | February 20, 2012 |
| 164 | 11 | Long Standing Legacies | The Glass Onion | Charleston, South Carolina | February 20, 2012 |
| 164 | 11 | Long Standing Legacies | Galway Bay Irish Pub | Annapolis, Maryland | February 20, 2012 |
| 165 | 12 | Time Tested Treasures | R&R Taqueria (Closed) | Elkridge, Maryland | February 27, 2012 |
| 165 | 12 | Time Tested Treasures | Nye's Polonaise Room | Minneapolis, Minnesota | February 27, 2012 |
| 165 | 12 | Time Tested Treasures | Moseberth's Fried Chicken (Closed) | Portsmouth, Virginia | February 27, 2012 |
| 166 | 13 | Outside the Box | Joe Squared Pizza (Closed) | Baltimore, Maryland | March 5, 2012 |
| 166 | 13 | Outside the Box | Pepe's and Mito's | Dallas, Texas | March 5, 2012 |
| 166 | 13 | Outside the Box | Savoy Café & Deli | Santa Barbara, California | March 5, 2012 |

=== Season 14 (2012) ===
| Total | Episode | Title | Restaurant | Location | Original Air Date |
|---|---|---|---|---|---|
| 167 | 1 | Triple D All Stars | Pizzeria Lola | Minneapolis, Minnesota | April 2, 2012 |
| 167 | 1 | Triple D All Stars | Monument Cafe | Georgetown, Texas | April 2, 2012 |
| 168 | 2 | Streamlined Sammies | Luke's Inside Out (Closed) | Austin, Texas | April 9, 2012 |
| 168 | 2 | Streamlined Sammies | Smack Shack at The 1029 Bar | Minneapolis, Minnesota | April 9, 2012 |
| 168 | 2 | Streamlined Sammies | Maple & Motor | Dallas, Texas | April 9, 2012 |
| 169 | 3 | Crankin' Up the Classics | Broders' Cucina Italiana | Minneapolis, Minnesota | April 16, 2012 |
| 169 | 3 | Crankin' Up the Classics | Chop House Burgers (Closed) | Arlington, Texas | April 16, 2012 |
| 170 | 4 | Passin' The Baton | Pete's Breakfast House | Ventura, California | April 23, 2012 |
| 170 | 4 | Passin' The Baton | Sip & Bite Restaurant | Baltimore, Maryland | April 23, 2012 |
| 171 | 5 | Big Time Flavor | Cane Rosso | Dallas, Texas | April 30, 2012 |
| 171 | 5 | Big Time Flavor | Marla's Caribbean Cuisine (Closed) | Minneapolis, Minnesota | April 30, 2012 |
| 171 | 5 | Big Time Flavor | Counter Cafe | Austin, Texas | April 30, 2012 |
| 172 | 6 | Unexpected Eats | Smalley's Caribbean Barbeque (Closed) | Stillwater, Minnesota | May 7, 2012 |
| 172 | 6 | Unexpected Eats | Johnny Garlic's (Closed) | Santa Rosa, California | May 7, 2012 |
| 172 | 6 | Unexpected Eats | Harvey's Hot Dogs II (Closed) | Portsmouth, Virginia | May 7, 2012 |
| 173 | 7 | BBQ Road Show | Pecan Lodge | Dallas, Texas | May 28, 2012 |
| 173 | 7 | BBQ Road Show | John Mull's Meats and Road Kill Grill | Las Vegas, Nevada | May 28, 2012 |
| 174 | 8 | All Vegas, All the Time | Naked City Pizza (New Location) | Las Vegas, Nevada | June 4, 2012 |
| 174 | 8 | All Vegas, All the Time | Forte European Tapas Bar & Bistro (Closed) | Las Vegas, Nevada | June 4, 2012 |
| 174 | 8 | All Vegas, All the Time | UNLV | Las Vegas, Nevada | June 4, 2012 |
| 175 | 9 | Serious Sandwiches | Lola's – A Louisiana Kitchen | Las Vegas, Nevada | June 11, 2012 |
| 175 | 9 | Serious Sandwiches | Noble Pig Sandwiches (Closed) | Austin, Texas | June 11, 2012 |
| 175 | 9 | Serious Sandwiches | Casper & Runyon's Nook | St. Paul, Minnesota | June 11, 2012 |
| 176 | 10 | International Eats | Gazala's Place | Manhattan, New York City, New York | June 18, 2012 |
| 176 | 10 | International Eats | Bachi Burger (Closed) | Las Vegas, Nevada | June 18, 2012 |
| 176 | 10 | International Eats | Afrah | Richardson, Texas | June 18, 2012 |
| 177 | 11 | Belly Up | Hopleaf Bar | Chicago, Illinois | June 25, 2012 |
| 177 | 11 | Belly Up | Foreign & Domestic | Austin, Texas | June 25, 2012 |
| 178 | 12 | Dynamic Dishes | Jawaiian Irie Jerk Restaurant | Honolulu, Hawaii | July 2, 2012 |
| 178 | 12 | Dynamic Dishes | Taste of Europe | Arlington, Texas | July 2, 2012 |
| 178 | 12 | Dynamic Dishes | Yayo Taco (Closed) | Las Vegas, Nevada | July 2, 2012 |
| 179 | 13 | Coast to Coast Chow | Camille's on Wheels (Closed) | Kailua, Hawaii | July 30, 2012 |
| 179 | 13 | Coast to Coast Chow | Chicago Brauhaus (Closed) | Chicago, Illinois | July 30, 2012 |
| 179 | 13 | Coast to Coast Chow | Dixie Supply Bakery & Cafe (Closed) | Charleston, South Carolina | July 30, 2012 |

=== Season 15 (2012) ===
| Total | Episode | Title | Restaurant | Location | Original Air Date |
|---|---|---|---|---|---|
| 180 | 1 | Unconventional Comforts | He'eia Kea Pier General Store and Deli | Kaneohe, Hawaii | August 5, 2012 |
| 180 | 1 | Unconventional Comforts | Rex Italian Foods | Norridge, Illinois | August 5, 2012 |
| 180 | 1 | Unconventional Comforts | Memphis Street Cafe (Name changed to Underground Cafe) | Hernando, Mississippi | August 5, 2012 |
| 181 | 2 | Goin' the Extra Mile | bopNgrill | Chicago, Illinois | August 13, 2012 |
| 181 | 2 | Goin' the Extra Mile | Sweet Home Waimanalo (Closed) | Waimanalo, Hawaii | August 13, 2012 |
| 182 | 3 | Savory Standouts | 90 Miles Cuban Cafe | Chicago, Illinois | August 19, 2012 |
| 182 | 3 | Savory Standouts | Davis' Pub | Annapolis, Maryland | August 19, 2012 |
| 182 | 3 | Savory Standouts | Rizzo's Diner (Closed) | Memphis, Tennessee | August 19, 2012 |
| 183 | 4 | Surf 'N' Turf Jackpot | Memphis Barbecue Co. | Horn Lake, Mississippi | August 27, 2012 |
| 183 | 4 | Surf 'N' Turf Jackpot | Fresh Catch | Honolulu, Hawaii | August 27, 2012 |
| 184 | 5 | Massachusetts Madness | Italian Express Pizzeria (Closed) | East Boston, Massachusetts | September 3, 2012 |
| 184 | 5 | Massachusetts Madness | Cutty's | Brookline, Massachusetts | September 3, 2012 |
| 185 | 6 | East Coast Comfort | Tupelo (Closed) | Cambridge, Massachusetts | September 24, 2012 |
| 185 | 6 | East Coast Comfort | Patti's Pierogis | Fall River, Massachusetts | September 24, 2012 |
| 185 | 6 | East Coast Comfort | Angelo's Civita Farnese | Providence, Rhode Island | September 24, 2012 |
| 185 | 6 | East Coast Comfort | Mediterraneo Caffe (Closed) | Providence, Rhode Island | September 24, 2012 |
| 186 | 7 | Flavortown Medley | South Of Beale (SOB) | Memphis, Tennessee | October 1, 2012 |
| 186 | 7 | Flavortown Medley | Big Wave Shrimp Truck | Haleiwa, Hawaii | October 1, 2012 |
| 186 | 7 | Flavortown Medley | Chaps Pit Beef | Baltimore, Maryland | October 1, 2012 |
| 187 | 8 | Burgers, Noodles and Quahogs | Boston Burger Company | Boston, Massachusetts | October 8, 2012 |
| 187 | 8 | Burgers, Noodles and Quahogs | Anthony's Seafood | Middletown, Rhode Island | October 8, 2012 |
| 187 | 8 | Burgers, Noodles and Quahogs | Guerilla Street Food (Closed) | St. Louis, Missouri | October 8, 2012 |
| 188 | 9 | Handcrafted | The Elegant Farmer (Name changed to The Farmer & New Location) | Memphis, Tennessee | October 15, 2012 |
| 188 | 9 | Handcrafted | Italian Corner | East Providence, Rhode Island | October 15, 2012 |
| 189 | 10 | All Family, All the Time | Anthonino's Taverna | St. Louis, Missouri | October 22, 2012 |
| 189 | 10 | All Family, All the Time | Three Angels Diner (Closed) | Memphis, Tennessee | October 22, 2012 |
| 189 | 10 | All Family, All the Time | Opal Thai Food (Closed) | Haleiwa, Hawaii | October 22, 2012 |
| 190 | 11 | Food Done Right | Aunt Carrie's | Narragansett, Rhode Island | October 29, 2012 |
| 190 | 11 | Food Done Right | The Shaved Duck | St. Louis, Missouri | October 29, 2012 |
| 190 | 11 | Food Done Right | Angela's Cafe | East Boston, Massachusetts | October 29, 2012 |
| 191 | 12 | Pubs and Grub | Dressel's Public House | St. Louis, Missouri | November 5, 2012 |
| 191 | 12 | Pubs and Grub | Outer Banks Brewing Station | Kill Devil Hills, North Carolina | November 5, 2012 |
| 191 | 12 | Pubs and Grub | Edgewood Cafe | Cranston, Rhode Island | November 5, 2012 |
| 192 | 13 | Turn On Traditional | Kitty Hoynes | Syracuse, New York | November 12, 2012 |
| 192 | 13 | Turn On Traditional | Espino's Mexican Bar and Grill | Chesterfield, Missouri | November 12, 2012 |
| 192 | 13 | Turn On Traditional | Yankee Lobster Company | Boston, Massachusetts | November 12, 2012 |

=== Season 16 (2012–13) ===
| Total | Episode | Title | Restaurant | Location | Original Air Date |
|---|---|---|---|---|---|
| 193 | 1 | Authentic Eats | Highway 61 Roadhouse and Kitchen | Webster Groves, Missouri | December 10, 2012 |
| 193 | 1 | Authentic Eats | Byblos Mediterranean Cafe | Syracuse, New York | December 10, 2012 |
| 194 | 2 | Fully Focused | Brine and Bottle (Closed) | Nags Head, North Carolina | December 17, 2012 |
| 194 | 2 | Fully Focused | Pastabilities | Syracuse, New York | December 17, 2012 |
| 195 | 3 | Far Out | La Isla Restaurant | Hoboken, New Jersey | December 24, 2012 |
| 195 | 3 | Far Out | Funk 'n Waffles | Syracuse, New York | December 24, 2012 |
| 195 | 3 | Far Out | Cravings | Duck, North Carolina | December 24, 2012 |
| 196 | 4 | Matches Made in Heaven | Ortegaz' Southwestern Grill | Manteo, North Carolina | January 7, 2013 |
| 196 | 4 | Matches Made in Heaven | The Smoke Joint (Closed) | Brooklyn, New York City, New York | January 7, 2013 |
| 197 | 5 | Savory Sensations | The Weeping Radish (Closed) | Jarvisburg, North Carolina | January 14, 2013 |
| 197 | 5 | Savory Sensations | Jimmy's Diner | Brooklyn, New York City, New York | January 14, 2013 |
| 198 | 6 | Hometown Haunts | Marie's Italian Specialties (Closed) | Chatham, New Jersey | January 21, 2013 |
| 198 | 6 | Hometown Haunts | Darby's Cafe (Closed) | Olympia, Washington | January 21, 2013 |
| 199 | 7 | Land to Sea | Empire Brewing Company (Closed) | Syracuse, New York | February 11, 2013 |
| 199 | 7 | Land to Sea | Black Pelican Oceanfront Restaurant | Kitty Hawk, North Carolina | February 11, 2013 |
| 199 | 7 | Land to Sea | Fish Tale Brew Pub (Closed) | Olympia, Washington | February 11, 2013 |
| 200 | 8 | Decadent Dishes | Crockett's Public House | Puyallup, Washington | February 18, 2013 |
| 200 | 8 | Decadent Dishes | Pies 'N' Thighs | Brooklyn, New York City, New York | February 18, 2013 |
| 201 | 9 | Eurocentric | Eva's European Sweets | Syracuse, New York | February 24, 2013 |
| 201 | 9 | Eurocentric | Bruno's European Restaurant | Tacoma, Washington | February 24, 2013 |
| 201 | 9 | Eurocentric | Hey Meatball (Closed) | Toronto, Ontario, Canada | February 24, 2013 |
| 202 | 10 | Hittin' the Grill | Crown Bar | Tacoma, Washington | March 4, 2013 |
| 202 | 10 | Hittin' the Grill | The Golden State (Closed) | Los Angeles, California | March 4, 2013 |
| 203 | 11 | Unlikely Partners | Beer Belly (Closed) | Los Angeles, California | March 11, 2013 |
| 203 | 11 | Unlikely Partners | Lakeview Restaurant | Toronto, Ontario, Canada | March 11, 2013 |
| 204 | 12 | Layers of Flavor | Tortugas' Lie | Nags Head, North Carolina | March 18, 2013 |
| 204 | 12 | Layers of Flavor | The Ace | Toronto, Ontario, Canada | March 18, 2013 |
| 205 | 13 | Real Deal Roots | Chomp Chomp Nation (Closed) | Irvine, California | March 25, 2013 |
| 205 | 13 | Real Deal Roots | Caplansky's (New Location) | Toronto, Ontario, Canada | March 25, 2013 |

=== Season 17 (2013) ===
| Total | Episode | Title | Restaurant | Location | Original Air Date |
|---|---|---|---|---|---|
| 206 | 1 | Tacos and Tots | Dirty Oscar's Annex | Tacoma, Washington | April 22, 2013 |
| 206 | 1 | Tacos and Tots | Highland Tavern | Denver, Colorado | April 22, 2013 |
| 207 | 2 | Chicken, Chili and Chowder | Sidecar Bar and Grille | Philadelphia, Pennsylvania | April 29, 2013 |
| 207 | 2 | Chicken, Chili and Chowder | Chili John's | Burbank, California | April 29, 2013 |
| 207 | 2 | Chicken, Chili and Chowder | Stockyards Smokehouse and Larder | Toronto, Ontario, Canada | April 29, 2013 |
| 208 | 3 | Dynamic Duos | Atomic Cowboy | Denver, Colorado | May 6, 2013 |
| 208 | 3 | Dynamic Duos | Perk Eatery | Scottsdale, Arizona | May 6, 2013 |
| 209 | 4 | Traditional Gone Wild | South Philadelphia Tap Room | Philadelphia, Pennsylvania | May 13, 2013 |
| 209 | 4 | Traditional Gone Wild | St. Francis | Phoenix, Arizona | May 13, 2013 |
| 210 | 5 | Peppers, Pork and Poutine | Barrio Cafe | Phoenix, Arizona | May 20, 2013 |
| 210 | 5 | Peppers, Pork and Poutine | Rosedale Diner | Toronto, Ontario, Canada | May 20, 2013 |
| 211 | 6 | Kings and Queens of 'Cue | Hops & Pie | Denver, Colorado | May 27, 2013 |
| 211 | 6 | Kings and Queens of 'Cue | Bludso's BBQ | Compton, California | May 27, 2013 |
| 211 | 6 | Kings and Queens of 'Cue | Percy Street Barbecue | Philadelphia, Pennsylvania | May 27, 2013 |
| 212 | 7 | A Festival of Flavor | Standard Tap | Philadelphia, Pennsylvania | June 17, 2013 |
| 212 | 7 | A Festival of Flavor | Curry Corner | Tempe, Arizona | June 17, 2013 |
| 212 | 7 | A Festival of Flavor | Prohibition | Denver, Colorado | June 17, 2013 |
| 213 | 8 | Timeless Traditions | Jamaican Jerk Hut | Philadelphia, Pennsylvania | June 24, 2013 |
| 213 | 8 | Timeless Traditions | DeFalco's Italian Eatery, Grocery & Deli | Scottsdale, Arizona | June 24, 2013 |
| 213 | 8 | Timeless Traditions | CoraFaye's Café | Denver, Colorado | June 24, 2013 |
| 214 | 9 | From Pound Cake to Pot Pie | Geechee Girl Rice Cafe | Philadelphia, Pennsylvania | July 1, 2013 |
| 214 | 9 | From Pound Cake to Pot Pie | Haggo's Organic Taco | Leucadia, California | July 1, 2013 |
| 214 | 9 | From Pound Cake to Pot Pie | The Duce | Phoenix, Arizona | July 1, 2013 |
| 215 | 10 | L.A. Eats | The Park's Finest BBQ | Los Angeles, California | July 8, 2013 |
| 215 | 10 | L.A. Eats | Eastside Market Italian Deli | Los Angeles, California | July 8, 2013 |
| 216 | 11 | All San Diego, All the Time | Hodad's | Ocean Beach, San Diego, California | August 5, 2013 |
| 216 | 11 | All San Diego, All the Time | OB Noodle House | Ocean Beach, San Diego, California | August 5, 2013 |
| 216 | 11 | All San Diego, All the Time | Pizzeria Luigi | North Park, San Diego, California | August 5, 2013 |
| 217 | 12 | From the Heart | Shirley's Tippy Canoe | Troutdale, Oregon | August 12, 2013 |
| 217 | 12 | From the Heart | Spirito's Italian Diner | Carlsbad, California | August 12, 2013 |
| 217 | 12 | From the Heart | Nopalito | San Francisco, California | August 12, 2013 |
| 218 | 13 | That's Fresh | Pica Pica | San Francisco, California | August 19, 2013 |
| 218 | 13 | That's Fresh | Edelweiss Sausage & Delicatessen | Portland, Oregon | August 19, 2013 |

=== Season 18 (2013–14) ===
| Total | Episode | Title | Restaurant | Location | Original Air Date |
|---|---|---|---|---|---|
| 219 | 1 | Neighborhood Knockouts | Crest Café | San Diego, California | August 26, 2013 |
| 219 | 1 | Neighborhood Knockouts | Show Dogs | San Francisco, California | August 26, 2013 |
| 219 | 1 | Neighborhood Knockouts | Industrial Cafe and Saloon | Portland, Oregon | August 26, 2013 |
| 220 | 2 | Meat Lover's Paradise | The Refuge | San Carlos, California | September 2, 2013 |
| 220 | 2 | Meat Lover's Paradise | The Country Cat | Portland, Oregon | September 2, 2013 |
| 221 | 3 | Servin' Up San Francisco | Miller's East Coast Deli | San Francisco, California | September 9, 2013 |
| 221 | 3 | Servin' Up San Francisco | Koja Kitchen Food Truck | San Francisco, California | September 9, 2013 |
| 221 | 3 | Servin' Up San Francisco | The Front Porch | San Francisco, California | September 9, 2013 |
| 222 | 4 | Cannoli, Fritters and Wings | Senor Sisig Food Truck | San Francisco, California | September 16, 2013 |
| 222 | 4 | Cannoli, Fritters and Wings | A Taste of Home Cooking | Wheat Ridge, Colorado | September 16, 2013 |
| 222 | 4 | Cannoli, Fritters and Wings | PDX671 | Portland, Oregon | September 16, 2013 |
| 223 | 5 | Aces of Authenticity | Casa Chimayo Restaurant | Santa Fe, New Mexico | October 21, 2013 |
| 223 | 5 | Aces of Authenticity | Frank's Noodle House | Portland, Oregon | October 21, 2013 |
| 223 | 5 | Aces of Authenticity | Torinos | Albuquerque, New Mexico | October 21, 2013 |
| 224 | 6 | Sammies and Stew | Jambo Cafe | Santa Fe, New Mexico | October 28, 2013 |
| 224 | 6 | Sammies and Stew | Bocadillos | Albuquerque, New Mexico | October 28, 2013 |
| 225 | 7 | All Kinds of Gobble Gobble | Back Street Bistro | Santa Fe, New Mexico | November 18, 2013 |
| 225 | 7 | All Kinds of Gobble Gobble | Golden Crown Panaderia | Albuquerque, New Mexico | November 18, 2013 |
| 225 | 7 | All Kinds of Gobble Gobble | Danny Edward's BBQ | Kansas City, Missouri | November 18, 2013 |
| 226 | 8 | Comfort and Soul | Tin Shed Garden Cafe | Portland, Oregon | November 25, 2013 |
| 226 | 8 | Comfort and Soul | Nexus Brewery | Albuquerque, New Mexico | November 25, 2013 |
| 226 | 8 | Comfort and Soul | BB's Lawnside BBQ | Kansas City, Missouri | November 25, 2013 |
| 227 | 9 | Pork, Pasta and Barbecue | Succotash | Kansas City, Missouri | December 2, 2013 |
| 227 | 9 | Pork, Pasta and Barbecue | Cupini's | Kansas City, Missouri | December 2, 2013 |
| 227 | 9 | Pork, Pasta and Barbecue | The Cube | Albuquerque, New Mexico | December 2, 2013 |
| 228 | 10 | South of the Border | Asi y Asado | Cabo San Lucas, Mexico | December 9, 2013 |
| 228 | 10 | South of the Border | Solomon's Landing | Cabo San Lucas, Mexico | December 9, 2013 |
| 228 | 10 | South of the Border | Tiki Bar | Cabo San Lucas, Mexico | December 9, 2013 |
| 229 | 11 | Tennessee Holiday Traditions | Center Point Pit Barbecue | Hendersonville, Tennessee | December 16, 2013 |
| 229 | 11 | Tennessee Holiday Traditions | Mas Tacos por Favor | Nashville, Tennessee | December 16, 2013 |
| 230 | 12 | Family Time | The Grilled Cheeserie | Nashville, Tennessee | December 23, 2013 |
| 230 | 12 | Family Time | Caffe Nonna | Nashville, Tennessee | December 23, 2013 |
| 230 | 12 | Family Time | Blue Koi | Kansas City, Missouri | December 23, 2013 |
| 231 | 13 | Soup, Salad and Seafood | Pot Pie | Kansas City, Missouri | December 30, 2013 |
| 231 | 13 | Soup, Salad and Seafood | 55 South | Franklin, Tennessee | December 30, 2013 |
| 231 | 13 | Soup, Salad and Seafood | Phat Bites | Nashville, Tennessee | December 30, 2013 |

=== Season 19 (2014) ===
| Total | Episode | Title | Restaurant | Location | Original Air Date |
|---|---|---|---|---|---|
| 232 | 1 | Guy's Hometown Tour | Pretzel Cart | Ferndale, California | February 7, 2014 |
| 232 | 1 | Guy's Hometown Tour | Ferndale Meat Co. | Ferndale, California | February 7, 2014 |
| 232 | 1 | Guy's Hometown Tour | Ivanhoe (Closed) | Ferndale, California | February 7, 2014 |
| 232 | 1 | Guy's Hometown Tour | Humboldt Sweets (Closed) | Ferndale, California | February 7, 2014 |
| 232 | 1 | Guy's Hometown Tour | Clendenen's Cider Works | Fortuna, California | February 7, 2014 |
| 232 | 1 | Guy's Hometown Tour | Loleta Cheese Shop (Closed) | Loleta, California | February 7, 2014 |
| 233 | 2 | All Things NY | Black Tree | Manhattan, New York City, New York | February 14, 2014 |
| 233 | 2 | All Things NY | Queen's Comfort | Queens, New York City, New York | February 14, 2014 |
| 233 | 2 | All Things NY | Paul's Live From New York | Eureka, California | February 14, 2014 |
| 234 | 3 | Big Time Bites | Bun-Ker Vietnamese | Queens, New York City, New York | February 21, 2014 |
| 234 | 3 | Big Time Bites | Brindle Room | Manhattan, New York City, New York | February 21, 2014 |
| 234 | 3 | Big Time Bites | Brick & Fire | Eureka, California | February 21, 2014 |
| 235 | 4 | Keepin' It Real | Sakaya Kitchen | Miami, Florida | February 28, 2014 |
| 235 | 4 | Keepin' It Real | Don Antonio By Starita | Manhattan, New York City, New York | February 28, 2014 |
| 235 | 4 | Keepin' It Real | Bless My Soul | Eureka, California | February 28, 2014 |
| 236 | 5 | Dynamite Duos | Duck's Eatery | Manhattan, New York City, New York | March 7, 2014 |
| 236 | 5 | Dynamite Duos | Whisk Gourmet | Miami, Florida | March 7, 2014 |
| 236 | 5 | Dynamite Duos | Café Nooner | Eureka, California | March 7, 2014 |
| 237 | 6 | Kickin It in Key West | Garbo's Grill | Key West, Florida | March 14, 2014 |
| 237 | 6 | Kickin It in Key West | Dj's Clam Shack | Key West, Florida | March 14, 2014 |
| 237 | 6 | Kickin It in Key West | Badboy Burrito | Key West, Florida | March 14, 2014 |
| 238 | 7 | From Meatballs to Lollipops | Maxwell's East Coast Eatery | Salt Lake City, Utah | April 25, 2014 |
| 238 | 7 | From Meatballs to Lollipops | Tin Roof Grill | Sandy, Utah | April 25, 2014 |
| 238 | 7 | From Meatballs to Lollipops | Latin House Grill | Miami, Florida | April 25, 2014 |
| 239 | 8 | Cross Country Comfort Food | The Silver Star Café | Park City, Utah | May 9, 2014 |
| 239 | 8 | Cross Country Comfort Food | Sammy's Bistro | Park City, Utah | May 9, 2014 |
| 239 | 8 | Cross Country Comfort Food | Blue Collar | Miami, Florida | May 9, 2014 |
| 240 | 9 | International Family Style | Artiso's | Salt Lake City, Utah | May 16, 2014 |
| 240 | 9 | International Family Style | Boot's and Kimo's Homestyle Kitchen | Kailua, Hawaii | May 16, 2014 |
| 240 | 9 | International Family Style | Oh Mai | Holladay, Utah | May 16, 2014 |
| 241 | 10 | Island Flavor | Dean's Drive Inn | Kaneohe, Hawaii | May 23, 2014 |
| 241 | 10 | Island Flavor | Uahi Island Grill | Kailua, Hawaii | May 23, 2014 |
| 241 | 10 | Island Flavor | Elena's Restaurant | Waipahu, Hawaii | May 23, 2014 |
| 242 | 11 | Grillin, Chillin & Huli Huli Chicken | The Federal | Miami, Florida | May 30, 2014 |
| 242 | 11 | Grillin, Chillin & Huli Huli Chicken | Mike's Huli Huli Chicken | Kaneohe, Hawaii | May 30, 2014 |
| 242 | 11 | Grillin, Chillin & Huli Huli Chicken | Tamarindo Truck | Orange County, California | May 30, 2014 |
| 243 | 12 | Righteous Bites | Loulou's Griddle In The Middle | Monterey, California | June 6, 2014 |
| 243 | 12 | Righteous Bites | Fat Sal's Deli | Los Angeles, California | June 6, 2014 |
| 243 | 12 | Righteous Bites | The Alley Restaurant At Aiea Bowl | Aiea, Hawaii | June 6, 2014 |
| 244 | 13 | Vegas Greats | Bachi Burger | Las Vegas, Nevada | April 14, 2014 |
| 244 | 13 | Vegas Greats | John Mull's Road Kill Grill | Las Vegas, Nevada | April 14, 2014 |
| 244 | 13 | Vegas Greats | Naked City Pizza | Las Vegas, Nevada | April 14, 2014 |
| 244 | 13 | Vegas Greats | Forte European Tapas Bar & Bistro | Las Vegas, Nevada | April 14, 2014 |
| 244 | 13 | Vegas Greats | UNLV | Las Vegas, Nevada | April 14, 2014 |
| 245 | 14 | Crazy for Chicken | Uncle Lou's | Memphis, Tennessee | April 18, 2014 |
| 245 | 14 | Crazy for Chicken | Tortugas' Lie | Nags Head, North Carolina | April 18, 2014 |
| 245 | 14 | Crazy for Chicken | 90 Miles Cuban Cafe | Chicago, Illinois | April 18, 2014 |
| 245 | 14 | Crazy for Chicken | Taco Taco Cafe | San Antonio, Texas | April 18, 2014 |
| 245 | 14 | Crazy for Chicken | Rincon Criollo | Queens, New York City, New York | April 18, 2014 |
| 245 | 14 | Crazy for Chicken | Tocabe American Indian Eatery | Denver, Colorado | April 18, 2014 |
| 245 | 14 | Crazy for Chicken | The Glass Onion | Charleston, South Carolina | April 18, 2014 |
| 245 | 14 | Crazy for Chicken | Opal Thai Food | Haleiwa, Hawaii | April 18, 2014 |
| 245 | 14 | Crazy for Chicken | PotPie | Kansas City, Missouri | April 18, 2014 |
| 245 | 14 | Crazy for Chicken | Smalley's Caribbean Barbeque | Stillwater, Minnesota | April 18, 2014 |
| 246 | 15 | Grilling Greats | Tom's Bar-B-Q | Memphis, Tennessee | June 21, 2014 |
| 246 | 15 | Grilling Greats | Luke's Inside Out | Austin, Texas | June 21, 2014 |
| 246 | 15 | Grilling Greats | Caplansky's Deli | Toronto, Ontario, Canada | June 21, 2014 |
| 246 | 15 | Grilling Greats | Danny's All-American Diner & Dairy Bar | Tampa, Florida | June 21, 2014 |
| 246 | 15 | Grilling Greats | Louie Mueller's Barbecue | Taylor, Texas | June 21, 2014 |
| 246 | 15 | Grilling Greats | Rick's Press Room Grill & Bar | Meridian, Idaho | June 21, 2014 |
| 246 | 15 | Grilling Greats | Maple & Motor | Dallas, Texas | June 21, 2014 |
| 246 | 15 | Grilling Greats | Jawaiian Irie Jerk Restaurant | Honolulu, Hawaii | June 21, 2014 |

=== Season 20 (2014) ===
| Total | Episode | Title | Restaurant | Location | Original Air Date |
|---|---|---|---|---|---|
| 247 | 1 | California Cruisin | Sabroso Mexican Grill | Garden Grove, California | September 5, 2014 |
| 247 | 1 | California Cruisin | Monterey Fish House | Monterey, California | September 5, 2014 |
| 247 | 1 | California Cruisin | Rutt's Hawaiian Cafe | Los Angeles, California | September 5, 2014 |
| 248 | 2 | Stuffed and Twisted | Sidewinder's American Grill | Jackson, Wyoming | September 12, 2014 |
| 248 | 2 | Stuffed and Twisted | Rosine's Restaurant | Monterey, California | September 12, 2014 |
| 248 | 2 | Stuffed and Twisted | Blunch | Boston, Massachusetts | September 12, 2014 |
| 249 | 3 | Old Standards, New Styles | Pinky G's Pizzeria | Jackson, Wyoming | September 19, 2014 |
| 249 | 3 | Old Standards, New Styles | The Starling Diner | Long Beach, California | September 19, 2014 |
| 249 | 3 | Old Standards, New Styles | Cannery Row Brewing Company | Monterey, California | September 19, 2014 |
| 250 | 4 | From Standards to Standouts | Factory Gastrobar | Long Beach, California | September 26, 2014 |
| 250 | 4 | From Standards to Standouts | Pica's Mexican Taqueria | Jackson, Wyoming | September 26, 2014 |
| 250 | 4 | From Standards to Standouts | Little Napoli | Carmel, California | September 26, 2014 |
| 251 | 5 | All Day Dining | Wild Plum Cafe & Bistro | Monterey, California | October 3, 2014 |
| 251 | 5 | All Day Dining | Nora's Fish Creek Inn | Wilson, Wyoming | October 3, 2014 |
| 251 | 5 | All Day Dining | Tavern on 2 | Long Beach, California | October 3, 2014 |

=== Season 21 (2014) ===
| Total | Episode | Title | Restaurant | Location | Original Air Date |
|---|---|---|---|---|---|
| 252 | 1 | Roadtrippin' in Beantown | Cafe Polonia | Boston, Massachusetts | September 5, 2014 |
| 252 | 1 | Roadtrippin' in Beantown | Lone Star Taco Bar | Allston, Massachusetts | September 5, 2014 |
| 252 | 1 | Roadtrippin' in Beantown | Deep Ellum | Allston, Massachusetts | September 5, 2014 |
| 253 | 2 | Seriously Saucy | Saus | Boston, Massachusetts | September 12, 2014 |
| 253 | 2 | Seriously Saucy | Cafe Genevieve | Jackson, Wyoming | September 12, 2014 |
| 253 | 2 | Seriously Saucy | Melt Eclectic Cafe | Cincinnati, Ohio | September 12, 2014 |
| 254 | 3 | Cross-Country Classics | Trina's Starlite Lounge | Somerville, Massachusetts | September 19, 2014 |
| 254 | 3 | Cross-Country Classics | Shorty's Pizza and Smoked Meat | Superior, Wisconsin | September 19, 2014 |
| 254 | 3 | Cross-Country Classics | From Scratch Restaurant | Carmel, California | September 19, 2014 |
| 255 | 4 | Worldwide Flavorfest | Casa Razdora | Boston, Massachusetts | September 26, 2014 |
| 255 | 4 | Worldwide Flavorfest | Island Frydays | Cincinnati, Ohio | September 26, 2014 |
| 255 | 4 | Worldwide Flavorfest | Pak's Green Corner | Duluth, Minnesota | September 26, 2014 |
| 256 | 5 | Small Town Standouts | Kounty Quarthouse | South Range, Wisconsin | October 3, 2014 |
| 256 | 5 | Small Town Standouts | Junkyard Extreme Burgers and Brats | Junction City, Oregon | October 3, 2014 |
| 256 | 5 | Small Town Standouts | Lotus Cafe | Jackson, Wyoming | October 3, 2014 |
| 257 | 6 | One Street Wonders | Taste of Belgium | Cincinnati, Ohio | October 10, 2014 |
| 257 | 6 | One Street Wonders | Senate Pub | Cincinnati, Ohio | October 10, 2014 |
| 257 | 6 | One Street Wonders | Bakersfield OTR | Cincinnati, Ohio | October 10, 2014 |
| 258 | 7 | Old School Joints | Cornbread Cafe | Eugene, Oregon | October 31, 2014 |
| 258 | 7 | Old School Joints | Gannucci's Italian Market | Duluth, Minnesota | October 31, 2014 |
| 258 | 7 | Old School Joints | Delta Diner | Delta, Wisconsin | October 31, 2014 |
| 259 | 8 | Meat In The Middle | The Sandwich League | Eugene, Oregon | November 7, 2014 |
| 259 | 8 | Meat In The Middle | The Brick House Cafe and Catering | Cable, Wisconsin | November 7, 2014 |
| 259 | 8 | Meat In The Middle | Grano's Pasta Bar | Baltimore, Maryland | November 7, 2014 |
| 260 | 9 | Soup-Centric | Soup Nation | Eugene, Oregon | November 14, 2014 |
| 260 | 9 | Soup-Centric | Slainte Irish Pub and Restaurant | Baltimore, Maryland | November 14, 2014 |
| 260 | 9 | Soup-Centric | Pho Lang Thang | Cincinnati, Ohio | November 14, 2014 |
| 261 | 10 | All Baltimore All The Time | Jimmy's Famous Seafood | Baltimore, Maryland | November 21, 2014 |
| 261 | 10 | All Baltimore All The Time | Clementine | Baltimore, Maryland | November 21, 2014 |
| 261 | 10 | All Baltimore All The Time | Johnny Rad's | Baltimore, Maryland | November 21, 2014 |
| 262 | 11 | Chicken Chowfest | Patton's Restaurant & Catering | Des Moines, Iowa | November 28, 2014 |
| 262 | 11 | Chicken Chowfest | Papa's Soul Food Kitchen and BBQ | Eugene, Oregon | November 28, 2014 |
| 262 | 11 | Chicken Chowfest | Swallow at the Hollow | Baltimore, Maryland | November 28, 2014 |
| 263 | 12 | Fresh Fish & Funky Chicken | Fisherman's Market | Eugene, Oregon | December 5, 2014 |
| 263 | 12 | Fresh Fish & Funky Chicken | Mi Patria Ecuadorian Restaurant | West Des Moines, Iowa | December 5, 2014 |
| 263 | 12 | Fresh Fish & Funky Chicken | Smokey D's BBQ | Des Moines, Iowa | December 5, 2014 |
| 264 | 13 | Oldies But Goodies | Ernest & Son | Brigantine, New Jersey | December 12, 2014 |
| 264 | 13 | Oldies But Goodies | Oyster Creek Inn | Leeds Point, New Jersey | December 12, 2014 |
| 264 | 13 | Oldies But Goodies | George The Chili King Drive-In | Des Moines, Iowa | December 12, 2014 |
| 265 | 14 | Southern Spectacular | Farmer's Shed | Lexington, South Carolina | December 22, 2014 |
| 265 | 14 | Southern Spectacular | Pine State Biscuits | Portland, Oregon | December 22, 2014 |
| 265 | 14 | Southern Spectacular | Sweetie Pie's | St. Louis, Missouri | December 22, 2014 |
| 265 | 14 | Southern Spectacular | Rick's White Light Diner | Frankfort, Kentucky | December 22, 2014 |
| 265 | 14 | Southern Spectacular | Zydeco's | Mooresville, Indiana | December 22, 2014 |
| 266 | 15 | Best of Breakfast | Ruth's Diner | Salt Lake City, Utah | December 23, 2014 |
| 266 | 15 | Best of Breakfast | Lake Effect Diner | Buffalo, New York | December 23, 2014 |
| 266 | 15 | Best of Breakfast | Mustache Bill's | Barnegat Light, New Jersey | December 23, 2014 |
| 266 | 15 | Best of Breakfast | Al's Breakfast | Minneapolis, Minnesota | December 23, 2014 |
| 266 | 15 | Best of Breakfast | Louie & the Red Head Lady | Mandeville, Louisiana | December 23, 2014 |
| 266 | 15 | Best of Breakfast | Grampa's Bakery & Restaurant | Dania Beach, Florida | December 23, 2014 |
| 266 | 15 | Best of Breakfast | W.O.W – Worth Our Weight | Santa Rosa, California | December 23, 2014 |
| 266 | 15 | Best of Breakfast | Schooner or Later | Long Beach, California | December 23, 2014 |
| 266 | 15 | Best of Breakfast | Matt's Big Breakfast | Phoenix, Arizona | December 23, 2014 |
| 267 | 16 | Memorable Moms | Rigoletto Italian Bakery & Café | Virginia Beach, Virginia | December 24, 2014 |
| 267 | 16 | Memorable Moms | Voula's Offshore Cafe | Seattle, Washington | December 24, 2014 |
| 267 | 16 | Memorable Moms | Nadine's Restaurant | Pittsburgh, Pennsylvania | December 24, 2014 |
| 267 | 16 | Memorable Moms | Kelly O's Diner | Pittsburgh, Pennsylvania | December 24, 2014 |
| 267 | 16 | Memorable Moms | Monte Carlo Steak House | Albuquerque, New Mexico | December 24, 2014 |
| 267 | 16 | Memorable Moms | Emily's Lebanese Deli | Minneapolis, Minnesota | December 24, 2014 |
| 268 | 17 | Hometown Heroes | Eischen's Bar | Okarche, Oklahoma | December 25, 2014 |
| 268 | 17 | Hometown Heroes | Otto's Sausage Kitchen | Portland, Oregon | December 25, 2014 |
| 268 | 17 | Hometown Heroes | South 21 Drive In | Charlotte, North Carolina | December 25, 2014 |
| 268 | 17 | Hometown Heroes | Kramarczuk Sausage Company | Minneapolis, Minnesota | December 25, 2014 |
| 268 | 17 | Hometown Heroes | Bob's Clam Hut | Kittery, Maine | December 25, 2014 |
| 268 | 17 | Hometown Heroes | Rainbow Drive-In | Honolulu, Hawaii | December 25, 2014 |
| 268 | 17 | Hometown Heroes | Tommy's Joynt | San Francisco, California | December 25, 2014 |
| 269 | 18 | Pork Hall of Fame | Union Wood Shop | Clarkston, Michigan | December 26, 2014 |
| 269 | 18 | Pork Hall of Fame | Dough Pizzeria Napoletana | San Antonio, Texas | December 26, 2014 |
| 269 | 18 | Pork Hall of Fame | Maria's Taco Express | Austin, Texas | December 26, 2014 |
| 269 | 18 | Pork Hall of Fame | Bar Gernika | Boise, Idaho | December 26, 2014 |
| 269 | 18 | Pork Hall of Fame | Valencia Luncheria | Norwalk, Connecticut | December 26, 2014 |
| 269 | 18 | Pork Hall of Fame | Santa Cruz Diner | Santa Cruz, California | December 26, 2014 |
| 269 | 18 | Pork Hall of Fame | North End Caffe | Manhattan Beach, California | December 26, 2014 |
| 269 | 18 | Pork Hall of Fame | The Oinkster | Eagle Rock, California | December 26, 2014 |
| 269 | 18 | Pork Hall of Fame | Haus Murphy's | Glendale, Arizona | December 26, 2014 |

=== Season 22 (2015) ===
| Total | Episode | Title | Restaurant | Location | Original Air Date |
|---|---|---|---|---|---|
| 270 | 1 | Fish, Fries and Feet | Flying Mango | Des Moines, Iowa | January 16, 2015 |
| 270 | 1 | Fish, Fries and Feet | Tacopocalypse | Des Moines, Iowa | January 16, 2015 |
| 270 | 1 | Fish, Fries and Feet | Kelsey & Kim's Southern Cafe | Atlantic City, New Jersey | January 16, 2015 |
| 271 | 2 | Cruisin' the Italian Countryside | La Taverna dei Miracoli da Mangiafuoco | Pescia, Pistoia, Italy | January 23, 2015 |
| 271 | 2 | Cruisin' the Italian Countryside | Windows of the World (W.O.W.) | Montecatini Terme, Pistoia, Italy | January 23, 2015 |
| 271 | 2 | Cruisin' the Italian Countryside | Port Ellen Clan | Lucca, Italy | January 23, 2015 |
| 272 | 3 | Fillin' Up in Florence | Fratelli Briganti | Florence, Italy | January 30, 2015 |
| 272 | 3 | Fillin' Up in Florence | La Cucina Del Garga | Florence, Italy | January 30, 2015 |
| 272 | 3 | Fillin' Up in Florence | Il Gusta Pizza | Florence, Italy | January 30, 2015 |
| 273 | 4 | Arizona All Stars | Tom's Thumb Fresh Market | Scottsdale, Arizona | February 6, 2015 |
| 273 | 4 | Arizona All Stars | Andreoli – Italian Grocer | Scottsdale, Arizona | February 6, 2015 |
| 273 | 4 | Arizona All Stars | Paradise Valley Burger Company | Phoenix, Arizona | February 6, 2015 |
| 274 | 5 | Roadtrippin' | The Anchorage Tavern | Somers Point, New Jersey | February 27, 2015 |
| 274 | 5 | Roadtrippin' | Salty's BBQ & Catering | Bakersfield, California | February 27, 2015 |
| 274 | 5 | Roadtrippin' | Sal's Gilbert Pizza | Gilbert, Arizona | February 27, 2015 |
| 275 | 6 | From Atlantic to Pacific | KC Steakhouse | Bakersfield, California | March 6, 2015 |
| 275 | 6 | From Atlantic to Pacific | Mama Roomba | Bakersfield, California | March 6, 2015 |
| 275 | 6 | From Atlantic to Pacific | Grilled Cheese & Crab Cake Co. | Somers Point, New Jersey | March 6, 2015 |
| 276 | 7 | Globe Tasting | The Wild Thaiger | Phoenix, Arizona | March 13, 2015 |
| 276 | 7 | Globe Tasting | Muertos Kitchen & Lounge | Bakersfield, California | March 13, 2015 |
| 276 | 7 | Globe Tasting | Carluccio's Coal Fired Pizza | Northfield, New Jersey | March 13, 2015 |
| 277 | 8 | Sweet, Savory and Saucy | La Santisima Gourmet Taco Shop | Phoenix, Arizona | April 17, 2015 |
| 277 | 8 | Sweet, Savory and Saucy | Moo Creamery | Bakersfield, California | April 17, 2015 |
| 277 | 8 | Sweet, Savory and Saucy | 24th Street Cafe | Bakersfield, California | April 17, 2015 |
| 278 | 9 | To Bakersfield and Beyond | Athena's Greek Cafe & Bakery | Bakersfield, California | April 24, 2015 |
| 278 | 9 | To Bakersfield and Beyond | Pyrenees Cafe | Bakersfield, California | April 24, 2015 |
| 278 | 9 | To Bakersfield and Beyond | Asian Experience | Taft, California | April 24, 2015 |
| 279 | 10 | Racing Through Charlotte | Pinky's Westside Grill | Charlotte, North Carolina | May 1, 2015 |
| 279 | 10 | Racing Through Charlotte | Pit Road Bar & Grill | Charlotte, North Carolina | May 1, 2015 |
| 279 | 10 | Racing Through Charlotte | The Tin Kitchen Food Truck | Charlotte, North Carolina | May 1, 2015 |
| 280 | 11 | Indulgent Dishes | Krazy Fish | Charlotte, North Carolina | May 22, 2015 |
| 280 | 11 | Indulgent Dishes | 300 East | Charlotte, North Carolina | May 22, 2015 |
| 280 | 11 | Indulgent Dishes | Biergarten | Los Angeles, California | May 22, 2015 |
| 281 | 12 | Griddles & Vittles | Guy Fieri's Kitchen and Bar | Las Vegas, Nevada | May 29, 2015 |
| 281 | 12 | Griddles & Vittles | Those Guys Pies | Las Vegas, Nevada | May 29, 2015 |
| 281 | 12 | Griddles & Vittles | Chichen Itza Restaurant | Los Angeles, California | May 29, 2015 |
| 282 | 13 | Intercontinental Flavorfest | Intermezzo Pizzeria and Cafe | Charlotte, North Carolina | June 5, 2015 |
| 282 | 13 | Intercontinental Flavorfest | The Little Jewel of New Orleans | Los Angeles, California | June 5, 2015 |
| 282 | 13 | Intercontinental Flavorfest | Cha Cha Chili | Los Angeles, California | June 5, 2015 |
| 283 | 14 | Food TruckAPalooza | Tamarindo Truck | Orange County, California | February 22, 2015 |
| 283 | 14 | Food TruckAPalooza | Garbo's Grill | Key West, Florida | February 22, 2015 |
| 283 | 14 | Food TruckAPalooza | The Grilled Cheeserie | Nashville, Tennessee | February 22, 2015 |
| 283 | 14 | Food TruckAPalooza | Fresh Local Wild | Vancouver, British Columbia, Canada | February 22, 2015 |
| 283 | 14 | Food TruckAPalooza | Don Chow Tacos | Los Angeles, California | February 22, 2015 |
| 283 | 14 | Food TruckAPalooza | Camille's on Wheels | Kailua, Oahu, Hawaii | February 22, 2015 |
| 283 | 14 | Food TruckAPalooza | KoJa Kitchen | San Francisco, California | February 22, 2015 |
| 284 | 15 | All Beefed Up | Terry's Turf Club | Cincinnati, Ohio | March 9, 2015 |
| 284 | 15 | All Beefed Up | Smokin Guns BBQ & Catering | Kansas City, Missouri | March 9, 2015 |
| 284 | 15 | All Beefed Up | Schellville Grill | Sonoma, California | March 9, 2015 |
| 284 | 15 | All Beefed Up | Paul's Coffee Shop | Fountain Valley, California | March 9, 2015 |

=== Season 23 (2015) ===
| Total | Episode | Title | Restaurant | Location | Original Air Date |
|---|---|---|---|---|---|
| 286 | 1 | A Bowlful of Soul | Mert's Heart & Soul | Charlotte, North Carolina | July 17, 2015 |
| 286 | 1 | A Bowlful of Soul | Crepe Expectations | Las Vegas, Nevada | July 17, 2015 |
| 286 | 1 | A Bowlful of Soul | Tubs Fine Chili | Culver City, California | July 17, 2015 |
| 287 | 2 | Taste of Asia | DAE GEE Korean BBQ | Denver, Colorado | July 24, 2015 |
| 287 | 2 | Taste of Asia | Fat Choy | Las Vegas, Nevada | July 24, 2015 |
| 287 | 2 | Taste of Asia | Osaka Japanese Bistro | Las Vegas, Nevada | July 24, 2015 |
| 288 | 3 | Tri-Continent Cuisine | Cafe Brazil | Denver, Colorado | July 31, 2015 |
| 288 | 3 | Tri-Continent Cuisine | Biju's Little Curry Shop | Denver, Colorado | July 31, 2015 |
| 288 | 3 | Tri-Continent Cuisine | Folk Art | Atlanta, Georgia | July 31, 2015 |
| 289 | 4 | From Biscuits to Briskets | Fox Bros Bar-B-Q | Atlanta, Georgia | August 7, 2015 |
| 289 | 4 | From Biscuits to Briskets | Buttermilk Kitchen | Atlanta, Georgia | August 7, 2015 |
| 289 | 4 | From Biscuits to Briskets | Restaurant 415 | Fort Collins, Colorado | August 7, 2015 |
| 290 | 5 | Homeland Favorites | Joy Cafe | Atlanta, Georgia | August 28, 2015 |
| 290 | 5 | Homeland Favorites | Axios Estiatorio | Denver, Colorado | August 28, 2015 |
| 290 | 5 | Homeland Favorites | Andale Taqueria & Mercado | Richfield, Minnesota | August 28, 2015 |
| 291 | 6 | Name That Kitchen | The Lodge Sasquatch Kitchen | Fort Collins, Colorado | September 11, 2015 |
| 291 | 6 | Name That Kitchen | Dana's Kitchen | Falmouth, Massachusetts | September 11, 2015 |
| 291 | 6 | Name That Kitchen | Pickle Jar Kitchen | Falmouth, Massachusetts | September 11, 2015 |
| 292 | 7 | East Coast Cruisin | Don Antonio by Starita | New York, New York | September 23, 2015 |
| 292 | 7 | East Coast Cruisin | Louis Restaurant | Providence, Rhode Island | September 23, 2015 |
| 292 | 7 | East Coast Cruisin | Crazy Burger Cafe & Juice Bar | Narragansett, Rhode Island | September 23, 2015 |
| 292 | 7 | East Coast Cruisin | The Dining Car & Market | Philadelphia, Pennsylvania | September 23, 2015 |
| 293 | 8 | Beef It Up | Driftwood Publick House & Oysteria | Plymouth, Massachusetts | September 18, 2015 |
| 293 | 8 | Beef It Up | The General Muir | Atlanta, Georgia | September 18, 2015 |
| 293 | 8 | Beef It Up | Buster's on 28th | Minneapolis, Minnesota | September 18, 2015 |
| 294 | 9 | By Hand and By Fork | Parkside Market | Falmouth, Massachusetts | September 25, 2015 |
| 294 | 9 | By Hand and By Fork | Maria Empanada | Denver, Colorado | September 25, 2015 |
| 294 | 9 | By Hand and By Fork | Bayport BBQ | Bayport, Minnesota | September 25, 2015 |
| 295 | 10 | Finger Lickin' Food | Wrecking Bar Brewpub | Atlanta, Georgia | October 9, 2015 |
| 295 | 10 | Finger Lickin' Food | Shucker's World Famous Raw Bar | Woods Hole, Massachusetts | October 9, 2015 |
| 295 | 10 | Finger Lickin' Food | George and the Dragon | Minneapolis, Minnesota | October 9, 2015 |
| 296 | 11 | Bite of Britain | Grillstock | London, United Kingdom | October 16, 2015 |
| 296 | 11 | Bite of Britain | Bird of Smithfield | London, United Kingdom | October 16, 2015 |
| 296 | 11 | Bite of Britain | Hook Camden Town | Camden, London, United Kingdom | October 16, 2015 |
| 297 | 12 | Piggin' Out | Pig Latin | Colorado Springs, Colorado | November 6, 2015 |
| 297 | 12 | Piggin' Out | North Bound Smokehouse and Brewpub | Minneapolis, Minnesota | November 6, 2015 |
| 297 | 12 | Piggin' Out | Unideli | Minneapolis, Minnesota | November 6, 2015 |
| 298 | 13 | Isle-Talian | The Blue-Eyed Crab Caribbean Grill & Rum Bar | Plymouth, Massachusetts | December 4, 2015 |
| 298 | 13 | Isle-Talian | Parvicini's Italian Bistro | Colorado Springs, Colorado | December 4, 2015 |
| 298 | 13 | Isle-Talian | Rasta Pasta | Colorado Springs, Colorado | December 4, 2015 |
| 299 | 14 | East-West Flavorfest | Mountain Shadows Restaurant | Colorado Springs, Colorado | December 18, 2015 |
| 299 | 14 | East-West Flavorfest | Toki Underground | Washington, D.C. | December 18, 2015 |
| 299 | 14 | East-West Flavorfest | Piccini Wood Fired Brick Oven Pizza | Ocean City, New Jersey | December 18, 2015 |
| 300 | 15 | Amazing Appetizers | Queen's Comfort | Astoria, Queens, New York City, New York | October 23, 2015 |
| 300 | 15 | Amazing Appetizers | Highland Tavern | Denver, Colorado | October 23, 2015 |
| 300 | 15 | Amazing Appetizers | Boulevard Diner | Dundalk, Maryland | October 23, 2015 |
| 300 | 15 | Amazing Appetizers | Clanton's Cafe | Vinita, Oklahoma | October 23, 2015 |
| 300 | 15 | Amazing Appetizers | 10th Ave Burrito Co | Belmar, New Jersey | October 23, 2015 |
| 300 | 15 | Amazing Appetizers | BBQ Shack | Paola, Kansas | October 23, 2015 |
| 300 | 15 | Amazing Appetizers | The Highlander | Atlanta, Georgia | October 23, 2015 |
| 300 | 15 | Amazing Appetizers | Scully's Tavern | Miami, Florida | October 23, 2015 |
| 301 | 16 | Ultimate Turkey Fest | Golden Crown Restaurant | Albuquerque, New Mexico | November 19, 2015 |
| 301 | 16 | Ultimate Turkey Fest | Bocadillas: Slow Roasted Sandwich Shop | Albuquerque, New Mexico | November 19, 2015 |
| 301 | 16 | Ultimate Turkey Fest | Funk N Waffles | Syracuse, New York | November 19, 2015 |
| 301 | 16 | Ultimate Turkey Fest | Supino Pizzeria | Detroit, Michigan | November 19, 2015 |
| 301 | 16 | Ultimate Turkey Fest | Comet Cafe | Milwaukee, Wisconsin | November 19, 2015 |
| 301 | 16 | Ultimate Turkey Fest | Mike's City Diner | Boston, Massachusetts | November 19, 2015 |
| 301 | 16 | Ultimate Turkey Fest | Sammy's Food Services & Deli | New Orleans, Louisiana | November 19, 2015 |
| 301 | 16 | Ultimate Turkey Fest | Alpine Steakhouse | Sarasota, Florida | November 19, 2015 |
| 301 | 16 | Ultimate Turkey Fest | Thee Pitts Again | Glendale, Arizona | November 19, 2015 |
| 302 | 17 | Extra Helpings | The Brick House Cafe and Catering | Cable, Wisconsin | November 27, 2015 |
| 302 | 17 | Extra Helpings | Cafe Genevieve | Jackson, Wyoming | November 27, 2015 |
| 302 | 17 | Extra Helpings | Tavern on 2 | Long Beach, California | November 27, 2015 |
| 302 | 17 | Extra Helpings | DJ's Clam Shack | Key West, Florida | November 27, 2015 |
| 302 | 17 | Extra Helpings | Café Nooner | Eureka, California | November 27, 2015 |
| 302 | 17 | Extra Helpings | Bless My Soul | Eureka, California | November 27, 2015 |
| 302 | 17 | Extra Helpings | Brick & Fire | Eureka, California | November 27, 2015 |
| 302 | 17 | Extra Helpings | Paul's Live From New York | Eureka, California | November 27, 2015 |
| 302 | 17 | Extra Helpings | Sakaya Kitchen | Miami, Florida | November 27, 2015 |
| 302 | 17 | Extra Helpings | Brindle Room | Manhattan, New York City, New York | November 27, 2015 |
| 302 | 17 | Extra Helpings | Black Tree | Manhattan, New York City, New York | November 27, 2015 |
| 303 | 18 | Holiday Hoopla | Mas Tacos | Nashville, Tennessee | December 11, 2015 |
| 303 | 18 | Holiday Hoopla | Center Point Pit Barbecue | Hendersonville, Tennessee | December 11, 2015 |
| 303 | 18 | Holiday Hoopla | Miller's East Coast Deli | San Francisco, California | December 11, 2015 |
| 303 | 18 | Holiday Hoopla | Flakowitz of Boynton | Boynton Beach, Florida | December 11, 2015 |
| 303 | 18 | Holiday Hoopla | The Bagel Delicatessen & Restaurant | Denver, Colorado | December 11, 2015 |
| 303 | 18 | Holiday Hoopla | At Last Cafe | Long Beach, California | December 11, 2015 |
| 303 | 18 | Holiday Hoopla | Big Daddy's BBQ & Banquet | Fairbanks, Alaska | December 11, 2015 |

=== Season 24 (2016) ===
| Total | Episode | Title | Restaurant | Location | Original Air Date |
|---|---|---|---|---|---|
| 304 | 1 | All Kinds of Meat | Alewife Baltimore | Baltimore, Maryland | January 1, 2016 |
| 304 | 1 | All Kinds of Meat | Carving Room | Washington, D.C. | January 1, 2016 |
| 304 | 1 | All Kinds of Meat | Spice Island Grill | Colorado Springs, Colorado | January 1, 2016 |
| 305 | 2 | Triple D "All Stars" | Tacopocalypse | Des Moines, Iowa | January 3, 2016 |
| 305 | 2 | Triple D "All Stars" | Aristo's (Closed) | Salt Lake City, Utah | January 3, 2016 |
| 305 | 2 | Triple D "All Stars" | Sakaya Kitchen | Miami, Florida | January 3, 2016 |
| 305 | 2 | Triple D "All Stars" | Chef Lou's Westside Drive-In | Boise, Idaho | January 3, 2016 |
| 305 | 2 | Triple D "All Stars" | Pagoda Restaurant | North Pole, Alaska | January 3, 2016 |
| 306 | 3 | Family Legacies | Miss Shirley's Cafe | Baltimore, Maryland | January 15, 2016 |
| 306 | 3 | Family Legacies | Sam's Rialto Bar & Grill | Pleasantville, New Jersey | January 15, 2016 |
| 306 | 3 | Family Legacies | Front Range Barbeque | Colorado Springs, Colorado | January 15, 2016 |
| 307 | 4 | Rockin' New Orleans | Parasol's Restaurant & Bar | New Orleans, Louisiana | January 20, 2016 |
| 307 | 4 | Rockin' New Orleans | The Joint | New Orleans, Louisiana | January 20, 2016 |
| 307 | 4 | Rockin' New Orleans | Casamento's Restaurant | New Orleans, Louisiana | January 20, 2016 |
| 307 | 4 | Rockin' New Orleans | Katie's Restaurant | New Orleans, Louisiana | January 20, 2016 |
| 307 | 4 | Rockin' New Orleans | Joey K's Restaurant & Bar | New Orleans, Louisiana | January 20, 2016 |
| 307 | 4 | Rockin' New Orleans | Surrey's Cafe | New Orleans, Louisiana | January 20, 2016 |
| 307 | 4 | Rockin' New Orleans | The Creole Creamery | New Orleans, Louisiana | January 20, 2016 |
| 308 | 5 | Between the Bread | Skirted Heiffer | Colorado Springs, Colorado | January 22, 2016 |
| 308 | 5 | Between the Bread | Bub and Pop's | Washington, D.C. | January 22, 2016 |
| 308 | 5 | Between the Bread | Vagabond Kitchen & Tap House | Atlantic City, New Jersey | January 22, 2016 |
| 309 | 6 | Comfort Food Mash-Up | Trina's Starlite Lounge | Somerville, Massachusetts | February 3, 2016 |
| 309 | 6 | Comfort Food Mash-Up | The Starling Diner | Long Beach, California | February 3, 2016 |
| 309 | 6 | Comfort Food Mash-Up | The Alley Restaurant at Aiea Bowl | Aiea, Hawaii | February 3, 2016 |
| 309 | 6 | Comfort Food Mash-Up | Frank's Noodle House | Portland, Oregon | February 3, 2016 |
| 309 | 6 | Comfort Food Mash-Up | Gold 'N Silver Inn | Reno, Nevada | February 3, 2016 |
| 309 | 6 | Comfort Food Mash-Up | Ramona Cafe | Ramona, California | February 3, 2016 |
| 310 | 7 | Smoke and Seafood | The Fish House | Key Largo, Florida | March 11, 2016 |
| 310 | 7 | Smoke and Seafood | Islamorada Shrimp Shack | Islamorada, Florida | March 11, 2016 |
| 310 | 7 | Smoke and Seafood | The Smoking Swine | Baltimore, Maryland | March 11, 2016 |
| 311 | 8 | International Appeal | Digiorgio's Cafe Largo | Key Largo, Florida | March 25, 2016 |
| 311 | 8 | International Appeal | El Nuevo Frutilandia | San Francisco, California | March 25, 2016 |
| 311 | 8 | International Appeal | Green Papaya Food Truck | Stockton, California | March 25, 2016 |
| 312 | 9 | Tacos, Turtles, and Tri-tip | Green Turtle Inn | Islamorada, Florida | April 8, 2016 |
| 312 | 9 | Tacos, Turtles, and Tri-tip | Midtown Creperie | Stockton, California | April 8, 2016 |
| 312 | 9 | Tacos, Turtles, and Tri-tip | Cosecha Cafe | Oakland, California | April 8, 2016 |
| 313 | 10 | Succulent Sandwiches | Clove and Hoof | Oakland, California | April 15, 2016 |
| 313 | 10 | Succulent Sandwiches | Food Fix Truck | Modesto, California | April 15, 2016 |
| 313 | 10 | Succulent Sandwiches | Pilot House Marina & Restaurant | Key Largo, Florida | April 15, 2016 |
| 314 | 11 | Hot Meat and Cool Veg | Souley Vegan | Oakland, California | April 22, 2016 |
| 314 | 11 | Hot Meat and Cool Veg | Bauer's 66 1/2 | Modesto, California | April 22, 2016 |
| 314 | 11 | Hot Meat and Cool Veg | M.E.A.T. Eatery and Tap Room | Islamorada, Florida | April 22, 2016 |
| 315 | 12 | South Beach Sizzle | Taquiza | Miami Beach, Florida | May 6, 2016 |
| 315 | 12 | South Beach Sizzle | Lou's Beer Garden | Miami Beach, Florida | May 6, 2016 |
| 315 | 12 | South Beach Sizzle | Hofbrau Beer Hall | Miami Beach, Florida | May 6, 2016 |
| 316 | 13 | Smoked, Grilled, and Fried | Commonwealth | Modesto, California | May 26, 2016 |
| 316 | 13 | Smoked, Grilled, and Fried | Miami Smokers | Miami, Florida | May 26, 2016 |
| 316 | 13 | Smoked, Grilled, and Fried | Smitty's Wings & Things | Stockton, California | May 26, 2016 |
| 317 | 14 | Cruisin' in Cuba | El Figaro | Havana, Cuba | June 3, 2016 |
| 317 | 14 | Cruisin' in Cuba | Nazdarovie | Havana, Cuba | June 3, 2016 |
| 317 | 14 | Cruisin' in Cuba | Restaurante Fonda Paladar la Paila | Havana, Cuba | June 3, 2016 |
| 318 | 15 | Havana Hot Spots | Al Carbon | Havana, Cuba | June 10, 2016 |
| 318 | 15 | Havana Hot Spots | La Catedral | Havana, Cuba | June 10, 2016 |
| 318 | 15 | Havana Hot Spots | Casa Abel | Havana, Cuba | June 10, 2016 |
| 319 | 16 | Great Gear | Gian's Deli | Stockton, California | June 17, 2016 |
| 319 | 16 | Great Gear | The Outrigger Pizza Company | Kihei, Hawaii | June 17, 2016 |
| 319 | 16 | Great Gear | CatHead's BBQ | San Francisco, California | June 17, 2016 |

=== Season 25 (2016) ===
| Total | Episode | Title | Restaurant | Location | Original Air Date |
|---|---|---|---|---|---|
| 320 | 1 | Soakin' Up Maui | Da Kitchen | Kahului, Hawaii | July 1, 2016 |
| 320 | 1 | Soakin' Up Maui | Fat Daddy's Smokehouse | Kihei, Hawaii | July 1, 2016 |
| 320 | 1 | Soakin' Up Maui | Like Poke | Kahului, Hawaii | July 1, 2016 |
| 321 | 2 | Asia, Africa and India | Radio Africa & Kitchen | San Francisco, California | July 8, 2016 |
| 321 | 2 | Asia, Africa and India | Belly & Snout | Los Angeles, California | July 8, 2016 |
| 321 | 2 | Asia, Africa and India | Gandhi Mahal Restaurant | Minneapolis, Minnesota | July 8, 2016 |
| 322 | 3 | Creole, Cold Cuts and Crepes | Star Noodle | Lahaina, Hawaii | July 15, 2016 |
| 322 | 3 | Creole, Cold Cuts and Crepes | The Herbivorous Butcher | Minneapolis, Minnesota | July 15, 2016 |
| 322 | 3 | Creole, Cold Cuts and Crepes | Harold & Belle's | Los Angeles, California | July 15, 2016 |
| 323 | 4 | Chew and Brew | Surly Brewing Company | Minneapolis, Minnesota | August 5, 2016 |
| 323 | 4 | Chew and Brew | The Local | Coral Gables, Florida | August 5, 2016 |
| 323 | 4 | Chew and Brew | Delancey Pizzeria & Bar | Hollywood, Los Angeles, California | August 5, 2016 |
| 324 | 5 | Global Greats | The Original Barone's Famous Italian | Valley Glen, Los Angeles, California | August 12, 2016 |
| 324 | 5 | Global Greats | Miso Phat Sushi | Kihei, Hawaii | August 12, 2016 |
| 324 | 5 | Global Greats | Holy Land | Minneapolis, Minnesota | August 12, 2016 |
| 325 | 6 | Sausage, Seafood and Shawarma | Street Food 360 | Portsmouth, New Hampshire | September 9, 2016 |
| 325 | 6 | Sausage, Seafood and Shawarma | Ivan's Cookhouse | North Miami Beach, Florida | September 9, 2016 |
| 325 | 6 | Sausage, Seafood and Shawarma | Red Wagon Pizza Company | Minneapolis, Minnesota | September 9, 2016 |
| 326 | 7 | Cosmopolitan Comfort | Azla Ethiopian Vegan | Los Angeles, California | September 16, 2016 |
| 326 | 7 | Cosmopolitan Comfort | Prairie Dogs | Minneapolis, Minnesota | September 16, 2016 |
| 326 | 7 | Cosmopolitan Comfort | Moxy | Portsmouth, New Hampshire | September 16, 2016 |
| 327 | 8 | Burgers, Buns and Bagels | The Kitchen | Portsmouth, New Hampshire | October 7, 2016 |
| 327 | 8 | Burgers, Buns and Bagels | Bagel Street | Plainsboro Township, New Jersey | October 7, 2016 |
| 327 | 8 | Burgers, Buns and Bagels | The Bun Shop | Los Angeles, California | October 7, 2016 |
| 328 | 9 | Big Food, Small Towns | Vincentown Diner | Vincentown, New Jersey | October 14, 2016 |
| 328 | 9 | Big Food, Small Towns | Rocky Hill Inn | Rocky Hill, New Jersey | October 14, 2016 |
| 328 | 9 | Big Food, Small Towns | Tuckaway Tavern & Butchery | Raymond, New Hampshire | October 14, 2016 |
| 329 | 10 | From Port to Port | Vida Cantina | Portsmouth, New Hampshire | November 4, 2016 |
| 329 | 10 | From Port to Port | Ataula | Portland, Oregon | November 4, 2016 |
| 329 | 10 | From Port to Port | P's & Q's Market | Portland, Oregon | November 4, 2016 |
| 330 | 11 | Turkey-giving | Jammin' Crepes | Princeton, New Jersey | November 18, 2016 |
| 330 | 11 | Turkey-giving | 45 Market Street Bakery & Cafe | Somersworth, New Hampshire | November 18, 2016 |
| 330 | 11 | Turkey-giving | The Table Cafe | Louisville, Kentucky | November 18, 2016 |
| 331 | 12 | Brunch, Bologna and Burgers | Gralehaus | Louisville, Kentucky | December 2, 2016 |
| 331 | 12 | Brunch, Bologna and Burgers | Grind Burger Kitchen | Louisville, Kentucky | December 2, 2016 |
| 331 | 12 | Brunch, Bologna and Burgers | The Original Dinerant | Portland, Oregon | December 2, 2016 |
| 332 | 13 | Carnivore Creations | Momma's Mustard, Pickles & BBQ | Louisville, Kentucky | December 23, 2016 |
| 332 | 13 | Carnivore Creations | Jersey Girl Cafe | Hamilton Township, New Jersey | December 23, 2016 |
| 332 | 13 | Carnivore Creations | Tails & Trotters | Portland, Oregon | December 23, 2016 |

=== Season 26 (2017) ===
| Total | Episode | Title | Restaurant | Location | Original Air Date |
|---|---|---|---|---|---|
| 333 | 1 | Belly Up to Barcelona | Cal Boter | Barcelona, Spain | January 6, 2017 |
| 333 | 1 | Belly Up to Barcelona | Can Conesa | Barcelona, Spain | January 6, 2017 |
| 333 | 1 | Belly Up to Barcelona | Pulperia A Gudiña | Barcelona, Spain | January 6, 2017 |
| 334 | 2 | A Sampling of Spain | Can Vilaro | Barcelona, Spain | January 13, 2017 |
| 334 | 2 | A Sampling of Spain | El Pacifico | Barcelona, Spain | January 13, 2017 |
| 334 | 2 | A Sampling of Spain | Bar Morryssom | Barcelona, Spain | January 13, 2017 |
| 335 | 3 | Mega Mouthfuls | The Seafood Lady | Louisville, Kentucky | January 20, 2017 |
| 335 | 3 | Mega Mouthfuls | Dolce & Clemente's | Robbinsville Township, New Jersey | January 20, 2017 |
| 335 | 3 | Mega Mouthfuls | Matt's BBQ | Portland, Oregon | January 20, 2017 |
| 336 | 4 | Swiss, Sandwiches and Sausage | Swiss Hibiscus | Portland, Oregon | February 10, 2017 |
| 336 | 4 | Swiss, Sandwiches and Sausage | Papi Queso Food Truck | Charlotte, North Carolina | February 10, 2017 |
| 336 | 4 | Swiss, Sandwiches and Sausage | JJ's Red Hots | Charlotte, North Carolina | February 10, 2017 |
| 337 | 5 | Beef, Lamb and Pig | Irish Rover | Louisville, Kentucky | February 17, 2017 |
| 337 | 5 | Beef, Lamb and Pig | The Improper Pig | Charlotte, North Carolina | February 17, 2017 |
| 337 | 5 | Beef, Lamb and Pig | Bang Bang Burgers | Charlotte, North Carolina | February 17, 2017 |
| 338 | 6 | Kickin' It in Cancun | Guy Fieri's Playa del Carmen Kitchen & Bar | Playa del Carmen, Mexico | March 17, 2017 |
| 338 | 6 | Kickin' It in Cancun | Mora Mora | Cancun, Mexico | March 17, 2017 |
| 338 | 6 | Kickin' It in Cancun | El Rincon de los Antojos | Cancun, Mexico | March 17, 2017 |
| 339 | 7 | Not Your Typical Joints | Q-Shi | Spring, Texas | March 24, 2017 |
| 339 | 7 | Not Your Typical Joints | Fud at Salud | Charlotte, North Carolina | March 24, 2017 |
| 339 | 7 | Not Your Typical Joints | El Fish Fritanga | Cancun, Mexico | March 24, 2017 |
| 340 | 8 | From North to South America | Pinchez Tacos | Cancun, Mexico | March 31, 2017 |
| 340 | 8 | From North to South America | Heist Brewery | Charlotte, North Carolina | March 31, 2017 |
| 340 | 8 | From North to South America | The Original Marini's Empanada House | Houston, Texas | March 31, 2017 |
| 341 | 9 | Goin' International | Cafe Lili | Houston, Texas | April 7, 2017 |
| 341 | 9 | Goin' International | Cool Runnings Jamaican Grill | Houston, Texas | April 7, 2017 |
| 341 | 9 | Goin' International | The Surfin' Burrito | Cancun, Mexico | April 7, 2017 |
| 342 | 10 | Wonder Women | The Meatball Stoppe | Orlando, Florida | April 21, 2017 |
| 342 | 10 | Wonder Women | Se7en Bites Bakeshop | Orlando, Florida | April 21, 2017 |
| 342 | 10 | Wonder Women | Irma's Original | Houston, Texas | April 21, 2017 |
| 343 | 11 | Multicultural Cooking | Willie's Pinchos | Orlando, Florida | April 28, 2017 |
| 343 | 11 | Multicultural Cooking | The Pastrami Project | Orlando, Florida | April 28, 2017 |
| 343 | 11 | Multicultural Cooking | Cuchara Restaurant | Houston, Texas | April 28, 2017 |
| 344 | 12 | Turkey, Taters and Dogs | Mrs. Potato | Orlando, Florida | May 12, 2017 |
| 344 | 12 | Turkey, Taters and Dogs | Fat One's Hot Dogs and Italian Ice | Orlando, Florida | May 12, 2017 |
| 344 | 12 | Turkey, Taters and Dogs | Sherman's Deli & Bakery | Palm Springs, California | May 12, 2017 |
| 345 | 13 | Burgers, Beef and Barbecue | HoBo's BBQ | Temecula, California | May 26, 2017 |
| 345 | 13 | Burgers, Beef and Barbecue | Saigon Noodle and Grill | Orlando, Florida | May 26, 2017 |
| 345 | 13 | Burgers, Beef and Barbecue | Grill-a-Burger | Palm Desert, California | May 26, 2017 |
| 346 | 14 | Chicken Trifecta | Fleetwood's on Front St. | Lahaina, Hawaii | June 9, 2017 |
| 346 | 14 | Chicken Trifecta | Thai Mee Up | Kahului, Hawaii | June 9, 2017 |
| 346 | 14 | Chicken Trifecta | Frankinbun | Palm Springs, California | June 9, 2017 |
| 347 | 15 | From Spicy to Icy | Zobo & Meester's | Cathedral City, California | June 16, 2017 |
| 347 | 15 | From Spicy to Icy | Down the Hatch Maui | Lahaina, Hawaii | June 16, 2017 |
| 347 | 15 | From Spicy to Icy | The Dirty Buffalo | Norfolk, Virginia | June 16, 2017 |
| 348 | 16 | Island and Desert | Wilma & Frieda | Palm Desert, California | June 30, 2017 |
| 348 | 16 | Island and Desert | Carib Shack | Virginia Beach, Virginia | June 30, 2017 |
| 348 | 16 | Island and Desert | Maui Brick Oven | Kihei, Hawaii | June 30, 2017 |
| 349 | Special | All Stacked Up | Bunk Sandwiches | Portland, Oregon | March 10, 2017 |
| 349 | Special | All Stacked Up | Norton's | Santa Barbara, California | March 10, 2017 |
| 349 | Special | All Stacked Up | Blue Collar | Miami, Florida | March 10, 2017 |
| 349 | Special | All Stacked Up | The Elegant Farmer | Memphis, Tennessee | March 10, 2017 |
| 349 | Special | All Stacked Up | Blue Water Seafood | San Diego, California | March 10, 2017 |
| 349 | Special | All Stacked Up | Sammy's Bistro | Park City, Utah | March 10, 2017 |
| 349 | Special | All Stacked Up | DeFalco's Italian Eatery, Grocery & Deli | Scottsdale, Arizona | March 10, 2017 |
| 349 | Special | All Stacked Up | Studio Diner | San Diego, California | March 10, 2017 |
| 349 | Special | All Stacked Up | Duarte's Tavern | Pescadero, California | March 10, 2017 |

=== Season 27 (2017–18) ===
| Total | Episode | Title | Restaurant | Location | Original Air Date |
|---|---|---|---|---|---|
| 349 | 1 | Sandwiches, Spaetzle and Sticky Wings | Alkaline | Norfolk, Virginia | July 7, 2017 |
| 349 | 1 | Sandwiches, Spaetzle and Sticky Wings | Pendulum Fine Meats | Norfolk, Virginia | July 7, 2017 |
| 349 | 1 | Sandwiches, Spaetzle and Sticky Wings | Brigit & Bernard's Garden Cafe | Kahului, Hawaii | July 7, 2017 |
| 350 | 2 | Flavor Adventure | Maui Fresh Streatery | Kahului, Hawaii | July 14, 2017 |
| 350 | 2 | Flavor Adventure | ediBOL | Los Angeles, California | July 14, 2017 |
| 350 | 2 | Flavor Adventure | Jessy's Tienda y Taqueria | Norfolk, Virginia | July 14, 2017 |
| 351 | 3 | Barbecue, Batter and Beer Can Chicken | Three's Bar and Grill | Kihei, Hawaii | July 21, 2017 |
| 351 | 3 | Barbecue, Batter and Beer Can Chicken | Batterfish | Santa Monica, California | July 21, 2017 |
| 351 | 3 | Barbecue, Batter and Beer Can Chicken | Horse Thief BBQ | Los Angeles, California | July 21, 2017 |
| 352 | 4 | Fun in the Sun | Big Wave Shrimp Truck | Haleiwa, Hawaii | July 28, 2017 |
| 352 | 4 | Fun in the Sun | Tiki Bar | Cabo San Lucas, Mexico | July 28, 2017 |
| 352 | 4 | Fun in the Sun | Chomp Chomp Nation | Orange County, California | July 28, 2017 |
| 352 | 4 | Fun in the Sun | Salty's BBQ & Catering | Bakersfield, California | July 28, 2017 |
| 352 | 4 | Fun in the Sun | Cravings | Duck, North Carolina | July 28, 2017 |
| 352 | 4 | Fun in the Sun | Curry Corner | Tempe, Arizona | July 28, 2017 |
| 352 | 4 | Fun in the Sun | Ted Peters Famous Smoked Fish | South Pasadena, Florida | July 28, 2017 |
| 353 | 5 | Mex to the Max | Andale | Richfield, Minnesota | August 14, 2017 |
| 353 | 5 | Mex to the Max | Chichén Itzá | Los Angeles, California | August 14, 2017 |
| 353 | 5 | Mex to the Max | Los Taquitos Mexican Food Grill | Phoenix, Arizona | August 14, 2017 |
| 353 | 5 | Mex to the Max | Taco Bus | Tampa, Florida | August 14, 2017 |
| 353 | 5 | Mex to the Max | Lone Star Taqueria | Salt Lake City, Utah | August 14, 2017 |
| 353 | 5 | Mex to the Max | Espino's Mexican Bar and Grill | Chesterfield, Missouri | August 14, 2017 |
| 353 | 5 | Mex to the Max | California Tacos | Omaha, Nebraska | August 14, 2017 |
| 354 | 6 | Ocean Coasts and Great Lakes | La Tostaderia | Los Angeles, California | September 15, 2017 |
| 354 | 6 | Ocean Coasts and Great Lakes | The Grilled Cheese Bistro | Norfolk, Virginia | September 15, 2017 |
| 354 | 6 | Ocean Coasts and Great Lakes | Meat Southern BBQ & Carnivore Cuisine | Lansing, Michigan | September 15, 2017 |
| 355 | 7 | A Passport of Flavor | La Panaderia | San Antonio, Texas | September 22, 2017 |
| 355 | 7 | A Passport of Flavor | Capital City BBQ | Lansing, Michigan | September 22, 2017 |
| 355 | 7 | A Passport of Flavor | Zaytoon Mediterranean | Lansing, Michigan | September 22, 2017 |
| 356 | 8 | Amazing Asian | Bun-ker | Ridgewood, Queens, New York | September 29, 2017 |
| 356 | 8 | Amazing Asian | Blue Koi | Kansas City, Missouri | September 29, 2017 |
| 356 | 8 | Amazing Asian | Pok Pok | Portland, Oregon | September 29, 2017 |
| 356 | 8 | Amazing Asian | Oh Mai | Holladay, Utah | September 29, 2017 |
| 356 | 8 | Amazing Asian | HRD Coffee Shop | San Francisco, California | September 29, 2017 |
| 356 | 8 | Amazing Asian | Wild Thaiger | Scottsdale, Arizona | September 29, 2017 |
| 357 | 9 | Old Faces, New Places | Fat Olives | Flagstaff, Arizona | October 6, 2017 |
| 357 | 9 | Old Faces, New Places | Sunset Pointe | Fairhope, Alabama | October 6, 2017 |
| 357 | 9 | Old Faces, New Places | Blackbrick | Miami, Florida | October 6, 2017 |
| 358 | 10 | From Pied to Fried | Buya Ramen | St. Petersburg, Florida | October 13, 2017 |
| 358 | 10 | From Pied to Fried | Eastside Fish Fry & Grill | Lansing, Michigan | October 13, 2017 |
| 358 | 10 | From Pied to Fried | Bourrée | New Orleans, Louisiana | October 13, 2017 |
| 359 | 11 | All in the Family | Mike's Chili Parlor | Seattle, Washington | October 27, 2017 |
| 359 | 11 | All in the Family | Tomahawk Restaurant | North Vancouver, British Columbia, Canada | October 27, 2017 |
| 359 | 11 | All in the Family | Tufano's Vernon Park Tap | Chicago, Illinois | October 27, 2017 |
| 359 | 11 | All in the Family | Brownstone Diner | Jersey City, New Jersey | October 27, 2017 |
| 359 | 11 | All in the Family | Tune-Up Café | Santa Fe, New Mexico | October 27, 2017 |
| 359 | 11 | All in the Family | Burger Bar | Roy, Utah | October 27, 2017 |
| 360 | 12 | Sammies and Spice | The Roost | Longmont, Colorado | November 10, 2017 |
| 360 | 12 | Sammies and Spice | Loops | Columbus, Ohio | November 10, 2017 |
| 360 | 12 | Sammies and Spice | Jitlada Restaurant | Los Angeles, California | November 10, 2017 |
| 361 | 13 | College-Town Champs | Pierogi Mountain | Columbus, Ohio | November 17, 2017 |
| 361 | 13 | College-Town Champs | Ray Ray's Hog Pit | Columbus, Ohio | November 17, 2017 |
| 361 | 13 | College-Town Champs | Aloy Thai Cuisine | Boulder, Colorado | November 17, 2017 |
| 362 | 14 | Breakfast, Brisket and Belly | Nighthawk Breakfast Bar | Venice, Los Angeles, California | December 15, 2017 |
| 362 | 14 | Breakfast, Brisket and Belly | Sweet Carrot | Columbus, Ohio | December 15, 2017 |
| 362 | 14 | Breakfast, Brisket and Belly | Bootleggers Modern America Smokehouse | Scottsdale, Arizona | December 15, 2017 |
| 363 | 15 | Poutine, Pizza and Pork | Samples Restaurant | Longmont, Colorado | January 5, 2018 |
| 363 | 15 | Poutine, Pizza and Pork | Tutta's Pizza (Closed) | Dallas, Texas | January 5, 2018 |
| 363 | 15 | Poutine, Pizza and Pork | Slanted Rice Vietnamese Bistro | Scottsdale, Arizona | January 5, 2018 |

=== Season 28 (2017–18) ===
| Total | Episode | Title | Restaurant | Location | Original Air Date |
|---|---|---|---|---|---|
| 361 | 1 | Mom's Kitchen | Zoe Ma Ma | Boulder, Colorado | December 22, 2017 |
| 361 | 1 | Mom's Kitchen | Ena's Caribbean Kitchen | Columbus, Ohio | December 22, 2017 |
| 361 | 1 | Mom's Kitchen | Republica Empanada | Mesa, Arizona | December 22, 2017 |
| 362 | 2 | Delicious Discoveries | Momo Ghar | Columbus, Ohio | January 19, 2018 |
| 362 | 2 | Delicious Discoveries | Tacos Mariachi (Closed) | Dallas, Texas | January 19, 2018 |
| 362 | 2 | Delicious Discoveries | Nora Restaurant and Bar | Dallas, Texas | January 19, 2018 |
| 363 | 3 | Bird and Beef | The Post Brewing Company | Longmont, Colorado | February 2, 2018 |
| 363 | 3 | Bird and Beef | One90 Smoked Meats | Dallas, Texas | February 2, 2018 |
| 363 | 3 | Bird and Beef | Tacos Chiwas | Phoenix, Arizona | February 2, 2018 |
| 364 | 4 | All Kinds of Comfort | Grubstak (Closed) | Gilbert, Arizona | February 18, 2018 |
| 364 | 4 | All Kinds of Comfort | Audrey Jane's Pizza Garage | Boulder, Colorado | February 18, 2018 |
| 364 | 4 | All Kinds of Comfort | Whistle Britches | Dallas, Texas | February 18, 2018 |
| 365 | 5 | Rollin' in the Dough | Aloha Kitchen | Mesa, Arizona | March 2, 2018 |
| 365 | 5 | Rollin' in the Dough | Renee's Organic Oven | Tucson, Arizona | March 2, 2018 |
| 365 | 5 | Rollin' in the Dough | Mojo Donuts and Fried Chicken | Miami, Florida | March 2, 2018 |
| 366 | 6 | International Intrigue | CrushCraft Thai Street Eats | Dallas, Texas | March 9, 2018 |
| 366 | 6 | International Intrigue | Milly's Empanada Factory | Miami, Florida | March 9, 2018 |
| 366 | 6 | International Intrigue | Zemam's | Tucson, Arizona | March 9, 2018 |
| 367 | 7 | Lights-Out Latin | Mr. & Mrs. Bun | Miami, Florida | March 30, 2018 |
| 367 | 7 | Lights-Out Latin | Ceviche's | Wilmington, North Carolina | March 30, 2018 |
| 367 | 7 | Lights-Out Latin | Cafe Tumerico | Tucson, Arizona | March 30, 2018 |
| 368 | 8 | Pizza, Pork and Peru | The Cosmos | Lansing, Michigan | April 6, 2018 |
| 368 | 8 | Pizza, Pork and Peru | Copper Penny | Wilmington, North Carolina | April 6, 2018 |
| 368 | 8 | Pizza, Pork and Peru | Inca's Peruvian Cuisine | Tucson, Arizona | April 6, 2018 |
| 369 | 9 | Seafood and Savory | Something Fishy Seafood Restaurant | Wilmington, North Carolina | April 27, 2018 |
| 369 | 9 | Seafood and Savory | The Purple Carrot | Okemos, Michigan | April 27, 2018 |
| 369 | 9 | Seafood and Savory | Chef Alisah's Restaurant | Tucson, Arizona | April 27, 2018 |
| 370 | 10 | Grab and Grub | Doce Provisions (Closed) | Miami, Florida | May 4, 2018 |
| 370 | 10 | Grab and Grub | Rocco's Little Chicago | Tucson, Arizona | May 4, 2018 |
| 370 | 10 | Grab and Grub | Fork-n-Cork | Wilmington, North Carolina | May 4, 2018 |
| 371 | 11 | BBQ Bites and Southern Flavor | Wood Shop BBQ | Seattle, Washington | May 25, 2018 |
| 371 | 11 | BBQ Bites and Southern Flavor | Cast Iron Kitchen | Wilmington, North Carolina | May 25, 2018 |
| 371 | 11 | BBQ Bites and Southern Flavor | Southern Cafe | Oakland, California | May 25, 2018 |
| 372 | 12 | East Coast, West Coast | Calafia Cafe | Palo Alto, California | June 8, 2018 |
| 372 | 12 | East Coast, West Coast | Sweet n Savory Cafe (Closed) | Wilmington, North Carolina | June 8, 2018 |
| 372 | 12 | East Coast, West Coast | W.E.P.A.! at Brix 581 | Oakland, California | June 8, 2018 |
| 373 | 13 | Italian, Hawaiian and Colombian | Umekes Fishmarket Bar & Grill | Kailua-Kona, Hawaii | June 29, 2018 |
| 373 | 13 | Italian, Hawaiian and Colombian | Pazzo | San Carlos, California | June 29, 2018 |
| 373 | 13 | Italian, Hawaiian and Colombian | LOBA Restaurant | Miami, Florida | June 29, 2018 |
| 374 | 14 | Playin' Chicken | Scolari's Good Eats | Alameda, California | July 6, 2018 |
| 374 | 14 | Playin' Chicken | Pizzeria Credo (Closed) | Seattle, Washington | July 6, 2018 |
| 374 | 14 | Playin' Chicken | Foster's Kitchen | Kailua-Kona, Hawaii | July 6, 2018 |
| 375 | 15 | On the Hook and In the Bun | The Red Door (Closed) | Seattle, Washington | July 27, 2018 |
| 375 | 15 | On the Hook and In the Bun | Rebel Kitchen | Kealakekua, Hawaii | July 27, 2018 |
| 375 | 15 | On the Hook and In the Bun | Grand Harbor | San Francisco, California | July 27, 2018 |
| 376 | 16 | Fusion of Flavors | Saucy Porka | Chicago, Illinois | August 3, 2018 |
| 376 | 16 | Fusion of Flavors | Sisters and Brothers Bar | Seattle, Washington | August 3, 2018 |
| 376 | 16 | Fusion of Flavors | Island Lava Java | Kailua-Kona, Hawaii | August 3, 2018 |
| 377 | 17 | Tasty Traditions | Piroshki on 3rd | Seattle, Washington | August 10, 2018 |
| 377 | 17 | Tasty Traditions | Kanaka Kava | Kailua-Kona, Hawaii | August 10, 2018 |
| 377 | 17 | Tasty Traditions | Manny's Cafeteria and Delicatessen | Chicago, Illinois | August 10, 2018 |
| 378 | 18 | Far East Flavorfest | Del Seoul | Chicago, Illinois | August 31, 2018 |
| 378 | 18 | Far East Flavorfest | Original Thai | Kailua-Kona, Hawaii | August 31, 2018 |
| 378 | 18 | Far East Flavorfest | Bok a Bok | Seattle, Washington | August 31, 2018 |
| 379 | 19 | Culinary Journey | Broke Da Mouth Grindz | Kailua-Kona, Hawaii | September 7, 2018 |
| 379 | 19 | Culinary Journey | MFK | Chicago, Illinois | September 7, 2018 |
| 379 | 19 | Culinary Journey | Blue Toba | Ashland, Oregon | September 7, 2018 |

=== Season 29 (2018–19) ===
| Total | Episode | Title | Restaurant | Location | Original Air Date |
|---|---|---|---|---|---|
| 380 | 1 | From Pork to Pasta | Ruins | Spokane, Washington | September 21, 2018 |
| 380 | 1 | From Pork to Pasta | Bella Luna Cafe | Chicago, Illinois | September 21, 2018 |
| 380 | 1 | From Pork to Pasta | Sun Wah BBQ | Chicago, Illinois | September 21, 2018 |
| 381 | 2 | Sandwiches, Southern and South of the Border | Roost Fried Chicken | Bozeman, Montana | September 28, 2018 |
| 381 | 2 | Sandwiches, Southern and South of the Border | Nordic Smoke BBQ | Spokane, Washington | September 28, 2018 |
| 381 | 2 | Sandwiches, Southern and South of the Border | Agave | Ashland, Oregon | September 28, 2018 |
| 382 | 3 | Pretzels, Pork and Paella | Storm Castle Cafe | Bozeman, Montana | October 19, 2018 |
| 382 | 3 | Pretzels, Pork and Paella | La Terraza Rum Longe | Little Rock, Arkansas | October 19, 2018 |
| 382 | 3 | Pretzels, Pork and Paella | Flyway Brewing | North Little Rock, Arkansas | October 19, 2018 |
| 383 | 4 | From Big Burgers to Little Italy | Zoftig Eatery | Santa Rosa, California | October 26, 2018 |
| 383 | 4 | From Big Burgers to Little Italy | Bruno's Little Italy | Little Rock, Arkansas | October 26, 2018 |
| 383 | 4 | From Big Burgers to Little Italy | North Bar | Little Rock, Arkansas | October 26, 2018 |
| 384 | 5 | Meaty Mashup | The Fold: Botanas & Bar | Little Rock, Arkansas | November 9, 2018 |
| 384 | 5 | Meaty Mashup | Simply Vietnam Express | Santa Rosa, California | November 9, 2018 |
| 384 | 5 | Meaty Mashup | Cochon Volant BBQ | Sonoma, California | November 9, 2018 |
| 385 | 6 | Burgers, Bacon and BBQ | The Root Cafe | Little Rock, Arkansas | November 23, 2018 |
| 385 | 6 | Burgers, Bacon and BBQ | Eight Noodle Shop (Closed) | Napa, California | November 23, 2018 |
| 385 | 6 | Burgers, Bacon and BBQ | Smoke Shack | San Antonio, Texas | November 23, 2018 |
| 386 | 7 | From Sandwiches to Stroganoff | Wrigleyville | San Antonio, Texas | November 30, 2018 |
| 386 | 7 | From Sandwiches to Stroganoff | Fat Tummy | San Antonio, Texas | November 30, 2018 |
| 386 | 7 | From Sandwiches to Stroganoff | Zazu Kitchen + Farm | Sebastopol, California | November 30, 2018 |
| 387 | 8 | Regional Recipes | Dignowity Meats (Closed) | San Antonio, Texas | December 14, 2018 |
| 387 | 8 | Regional Recipes | Ma Harper's Creole Kitchen | San Antonio, Texas | December 14, 2018 |
| 387 | 8 | Regional Recipes | Taqueria Molcajetes | Santa Rosa, California | December 14, 2018 |
| 388 | 9 | Cultural Twist | Finn's Cafe | Salt Lake City, Utah | January 4, 2019 |
| 388 | 9 | Cultural Twist | Red's Chinese | New Orleans, Louisiana | January 4, 2019 |
| 388 | 9 | Cultural Twist | Curry Pizza | West Valley City, Utah | January 4, 2019 |
| 389 | 10 | Handy Helpings | Hruska's Kolaches | Salt Lake City, Utah | January 25, 2019 |
| 389 | 10 | Handy Helpings | Proper Burger Company | Salt Lake City, Utah | January 25, 2019 |
| 389 | 10 | Handy Helpings | Rreal Tacos | Atlanta, Georgia | January 25, 2019 |
| 390 | 11 | Round the World Roundup | Yakitori Jinbei | Smyrna, Georgia | February 8, 2019 |
| 390 | 11 | Round the World Roundup | OneTaco | Austin, Texas | February 8, 2019 |
| 390 | 11 | Round the World Roundup | Laziz Kitchen | Salt Lake City, Utah | February 8, 2019 |
| 391 | 12 | Whole Lotta Comfort | Twisted Soul Cookhouse & Pours | Atlanta, Georgia | February 15, 2019 |
| 391 | 12 | Whole Lotta Comfort | Purgatory | Salt Lake City, Utah | February 15, 2019 |
| 391 | 12 | Whole Lotta Comfort | Valentina's (Closed) | Austin, Texas | February 15, 2019 |
| 392 | 13 | Eating Up New Orleans | Piece of Meat | New Orleans, Louisiana | March 1, 2019 |
| 392 | 13 | Eating Up New Orleans | Seither's Seafood | New Orleans, Louisiana | March 1, 2019 |
| 392 | 13 | Eating Up New Orleans | Avery's on Tulane | New Orleans, Louisiana | March 1, 2019 |
| 393 | 14 | Sandwich Showcase | Holy Roller (Closed) | Austin, Texas | February 22, 2019 |
| 393 | 14 | Sandwich Showcase | SLAB BBQ & Beer | Austin, Texas | February 22, 2019 |
| 393 | 14 | Sandwich Showcase | Vinny's Bakery (Closed) | Pasco, Washington | February 22, 2019 |
| 394 | 15 | Southern to South American | Greens & Gravy | Atlanta, Georgia | March 8, 2019 |
| 394 | 15 | Southern to South American | Boteco (Closed) | Austin, Texas | March 8, 2019 |
| 394 | 15 | Southern to South American | Porter's Real Barbecue | Richland, Washington | March 8, 2019 |
| 395 | 16 | Mega Meat and Sweet Treats | Hankook Taqueria | Atlanta, Georgia | March 29, 2019 |
| 395 | 16 | Mega Meat and Sweet Treats | Pieous | Austin, Texas | March 29, 2019 |
| 395 | 16 | Mega Meat and Sweet Treats | The Folded Pizza Pie (Closed) | Richland, Washington | March 29, 2019 |
| 396 | 17 | Belly, Beef and Bratwurst | Barley's Brewhub | Kennewick, Washington | April 12, 2019 |
| 396 | 17 | Belly, Beef and Bratwurst | Fable Diner | Vancouver, British Columbia, Canada | April 12, 2019 |
| 396 | 17 | Belly, Beef and Bratwurst | Pijiu Belly (Closed) | Atlanta, Georgia | April 12, 2019 |
| 397 | 18 | Coming Together in Cali | Grana | Chico, California | April 19, 2019 |
| 397 | 18 | Coming Together in Cali | Upper Crust Bakery & Cafe | Chico, California | April 19, 2019 |
| 397 | 18 | Coming Together in Cali | The Banshee | Chico, California | April 19, 2019 |
| 398 | 19 | Burger and Breakfast | The Pie Hole | Vancouver, British Columbia, Canada | May 3, 2019 |
| 398 | 19 | Burger and Breakfast | Sin of Cortez | Chico, California | May 3, 2019 |
| 398 | 19 | Burger and Breakfast | Ethos Bakery & Cafe | Richland, Washington | May 3, 2019 |
| 399 | 20 | Not Your Everyday Eats | Frost Me Sweet Bakery & Bistro | Richland, Washington | May 10, 2019 |
| 399 | 20 | Not Your Everyday Eats | Momona | Chico, California | May 10, 2019 |
| 399 | 20 | Not Your Everyday Eats | Tuc Craft Kitchen (Closed) | Vancouver, British Columbia, Canada | May 10, 2019 |

=== Season 30 (2019) ===
| Total | Episode | Title | Restaurant | Location | Original Air Date |
|---|---|---|---|---|---|
| 400 | 1 | Piling on the Pork | Turkey and the Wolf | New Orleans, Louisiana | January 11, 2019 |
| 400 | 1 | Piling on the Pork | Marjie's Grill (Closed) | New Orleans, Louisiana | January 11, 2019 |
| 400 | 1 | Piling on the Pork | Luna Rosa Puerto Rican Grill y Tapas | San Antonio, Texas | January 11, 2019 |
| 401 | 2 | A World of Barbecue | Tahini Nui | Kauaʻi, Hawaii | May 24, 2019 |
| 401 | 2 | A World of Barbecue | Grand Ole BBQ | San Diego, California | May 24, 2019 |
| 401 | 2 | A World of Barbecue | Locale BBQ Post | Wilmington, Delaware | May 24, 2019 |
| 402 | 3 | Sausage, Shawarma and Scaloppini | Tahini | San Diego, California | June 1, 2019 |
| 402 | 3 | Sausage, Shawarma and Scaloppini | Corduroy Pie Co. | Vancouver, British Columbia, Canada | June 1, 2019 |
| 402 | 3 | Sausage, Shawarma and Scaloppini | Luigi Vitrone's Pastabilities Trattoria | Wilmington, Delaware | June 1, 2019 |
| 403 | 4 | British, Hawaiian, and Mexican | Chuy's Taco Shop | San Diego, California | June 7, 2019 |
| 403 | 4 | British, Hawaiian, and Mexican | The Dolphin Restaurant | Hanalei, Hawaii | June 7, 2019 |
| 403 | 4 | British, Hawaiian, and Mexican | Stoney's Pub | Wilmington, Delaware | June 7, 2019 |
| 404 | 5 | Standout Seafood | The Rawbar | Chico, California | June 23, 2019 |
| 404 | 5 | Standout Seafood | Hanalei Poke Food Truck | Hanalei, Hawaii | June 23, 2019 |
| 404 | 5 | Standout Seafood | The Fish Counter | Vancouver, British Columbia, Canada | June 23, 2019 |
| 405 | 6 | Crazy Chicken and Twisted Burgers | Tiger! Tiger! | San Diego, California | July 6, 2019 |
| 405 | 6 | Crazy Chicken and Twisted Burgers | Farmer & The Cow | Wilmington, Delaware | July 6, 2019 |
| 405 | 6 | Crazy Chicken and Twisted Burgers | Jackalope's Neighbourhood Dive | Vancouver, British Columbia, Canada | July 6, 2019 |
| 406 | 7 | International Infusion | Tiki Iniki | Kauaʻi, Hawaii | July 17, 2019 |
| 406 | 7 | International Infusion | Alforon | San Diego, California | July 17, 2019 |
| 406 | 7 | International Infusion | Maiale Deli and Salumeria (Closed) | Wilmington, Delaware | July 17, 2019 |
| 407 | 8 | Beef Bonanza | Jo's Diner | San Diego, California | July 25, 2019 |
| 407 | 8 | Beef Bonanza | Mrs. Robino's | Wilmington, Delaware | July 25, 2019 |
| 407 | 8 | Beef Bonanza | Tasty Kabob | El Paso, Texas | July 25, 2019 |
| 408 | 9 | Spinning the Globe | Saimin Dojo | Kapa'a, Hawaii | August 2, 2019 |
| 408 | 9 | Spinning the Globe | Kansas City Taco Company | Kansas City, Missouri | August 2, 2019 |
| 408 | 9 | Spinning the Globe | Lick It Up | El Paso, Texas | August 2, 2019 |
| 409 | 10 | From Australian to Asian | Banksia | Kansas City, Missouri | August 16, 2019 |
| 409 | 10 | From Australian to Asian | Kenji Burger | Kauaʻi, Hawaii | August 16, 2019 |
| 409 | 10 | From Australian to Asian | Rulis' International Kitchen | El Paso, Texas | August 16, 2019 |
| 410 | 11 | Loaded, Stuffed and Fried | Arable (Closed) | Santa Fe, New Mexico | August 23, 2019 |
| 410 | 11 | Loaded, Stuffed and Fried | Jarocho | Kansas City, Kansas | August 23, 2019 |
| 410 | 11 | Loaded, Stuffed and Fried | Desert Oak Barbeque | El Paso, Texas | August 23, 2019 |
| 411 | 12 | Full of Surprises | Extra Virgin | Kansas City, Missouri | September 6, 2019 |
| 411 | 12 | Full of Surprises | DELIght | El Paso, Texas | September 6, 2019 |
| 411 | 12 | Full of Surprises | Joseph's Culinary Pub | Santa Fe, New Mexico | September 6, 2019 |
| 412 | 13 | Far-Flung Flavor | Krokstrom (Closed) | Kansas City, Missouri | September 13, 2019 |
| 412 | 13 | Far-Flung Flavor | The Beestro | Santa Fe, New Mexico | September 13, 2019 |
| 412 | 13 | Far-Flung Flavor | La Colonial Tortilla Factory | El Paso, Texas | September 13, 2019 |
| 413 | 14 | Pizza Plus | Dirty Water Dough Company | Boston, Massachusetts | October 4, 2019 |
| 413 | 14 | Pizza Plus | Dr. Field Goods Kitchen | Santa Fe, New Mexico | October 4, 2019 |
| 413 | 14 | Pizza Plus | Noble Pie Parlor | Reno, Nevada | October 4, 2019 |
| 414 | 15 | Bagels, Biscuit and Boar | Washoe Public House | Reno, Nevada | October 11, 2019 |
| 414 | 15 | Bagels, Biscuit and Boar | Rowley Farmhouse Ales | Santa Fe, New Mexico | October 11, 2019 |
| 414 | 15 | Bagels, Biscuit and Boar | Bagelsaurus | Cambridge, Massachusetts | October 11, 2019 |
| 415 | 16 | Unique Eats | Veggie Galaxy | Cambridge, Massachusetts | October 18, 2019 |
| 415 | 16 | Unique Eats | Paper Dosa | Santa Fe, New Mexico | October 18, 2019 |
| 415 | 16 | Unique Eats | Yoshi's Unique Deli | Reno, Nevada | October 18, 2019 |
| 416 | 17 | Eating Alaska | V's Cellar Door | Juneau, Alaska | November 1, 2019 |
| 416 | 17 | Eating Alaska | Pucker Wilson's | Juneau, Alaska | November 1, 2019 |
| 416 | 17 | Eating Alaska | Forno Rosso | Juneau, Alaska | November 1, 2019 |
| 417 | 18 | Northern Southern | Zerelda's Bistro | Juneau, Alaska | November 8, 2019 |
| 417 | 18 | Northern Southern | Highland Fried | Cambridge, Massachusetts | November 8, 2019 |
| 417 | 18 | Northern Southern | Carolina Kitchen and Barbeque Company | Sparks, Nevada | November 8, 2019 |
| 418 | 19 | Cruisin' Capital Cities | Perly's Restaurant and Delicatessen | Richmond, Virginia | November 22, 2019 |
| 418 | 19 | Cruisin' Capital Cities | In Bocca al Lupo | Juneau, Alaska | November 22, 2019 |
| 418 | 19 | Cruisin' Capital Cities | Jax | Ottawa, Ontario, Canada | November 22, 2019 |

=== Season 31 (2019–20) ===
| Total | Episode | Title | Restaurant | Location | Original Air Date |
|---|---|---|---|---|---|
| 419 | 1 | Guy's All-Star Guests | In a Pickle | Waltham, Massachusetts | November 29, 2019 |
| 419 | 1 | Guy's All-Star Guests | Pigwich | Kansas City, Missouri | November 29, 2019 |
| 419 | 1 | Guy's All-Star Guests | Pauli's | Boston, Massachusetts | November 29, 2019 |
| 420 | 2 | Family Meals | Char-B-Que | Reno, Nevada | December 6, 2019 |
| 420 | 2 | Family Meals | Pop's Market | Richmond, Virginia | December 6, 2019 |
| 420 | 2 | Family Meals | Pelican Seafood Market & Grill | Ottawa, Ontario, Canada | December 6, 2019 |
| 421 | 3 | Off the Beaten Path | Carena's Jamaican Grille | Chesterfield, Virginia | January 3, 2020 |
| 421 | 3 | Off the Beaten Path | Occo Kitchen & Bar | Ottawa, Ontario, Canada | January 3, 2020 |
| 421 | 3 | Off the Beaten Path | Full Belly Deli | Reno, Nevada | January 3, 2020 |
| 422 | 4 | Meat Sampler | Meat Press (Closed) | Ottawa, Ontario, Canada | January 17, 2020 |
| 422 | 4 | Meat Sampler | Citizen Cider | Burlington, Vermont | January 17, 2020 |
| 422 | 4 | Meat Sampler | Soul Taco | Richmond, Virginia | January 17, 2020 |
| 423 | 5 | Smokin' Hot BBQ | The Foolish Chicken | Ottawa, Ontario, Canada | January 31, 2020 |
| 423 | 5 | Smokin' Hot BBQ | Bluebird Barbecue | Burlington, Vermont | January 31, 2020 |
| 423 | 5 | Smokin' Hot BBQ | ZZQ Texas Craft Barbeque | Richmond, Virginia | January 31, 2020 |
| 424 | 6 | Savory with a Side of Sweet | Grammy's Goodies | Wheat Ridge, Colorado | February 7, 2020 |
| 424 | 6 | Savory with a Side of Sweet | Pingala Cafe | Burlington, Vermont | February 7, 2020 |
| 424 | 6 | Savory with a Side of Sweet | Herm's Inn | Logan, Utah | February 7, 2020 |
| 425 | 7 | Lots of Latin | Areyto | Denver, Colorado | February 21, 2020 |
| 425 | 7 | Lots of Latin | El Salvador Los Primas | Logan, Utah | February 21, 2020 |
| 425 | 7 | Lots of Latin | Taco Gordo | Burlington, Vermont | February 21, 2020 |
| 426 | 8 | Mom and Dad | Welton St. Cafe | Denver, Colorado | March 6, 2020 |
| 426 | 8 | Mom and Dad | Hong's Chinese Dumplings | Burlington, Vermont | March 6, 2020 |
| 426 | 8 | Mom and Dad | Tandoori Oven | Logan, Utah | March 6, 2020 |
| 427 | 9 | Down-Home Flavor | Florence's Cafe | Oklahoma City, Oklahoma | March 20, 2020 |
| 427 | 9 | Down-Home Flavor | The Pie Dump | Garland, Utah | March 20, 2020 |
| 427 | 9 | Down-Home Flavor | Just Be Kitchen | Denver, Colorado | March 20, 2020 |
| 428 | 10 | From Beef to Bao | Bun Daddy | Juneau, Alaska | April 3, 2020 |
| 428 | 10 | From Beef to Bao | il porcellino salumi | Denver, Colorado | April 3, 2020 |
| 428 | 10 | From Beef to Bao | Sabores | Logan, Utah | April 3, 2020 |
| 429 | 11 | Hometown Inspiration | Blue Pan | Denver, Colorado | April 17, 2020 |
| 429 | 11 | Hometown Inspiration | Aviv (Closed) | Portland, Oregon | April 17, 2020 |
| 429 | 11 | Hometown Inspiration | Maymoes (Closed) | Logan, Utah | April 17, 2020 |
| 430 | 12 | Sicilian and Seafood | Pirate Republic | Ft. Lauderdale, Florida | June 19, 2020 |
| 430 | 12 | Sicilian and Seafood | The Saucee Sicilian | Oklahoma City, Oklahoma | June 19, 2020 |
| 430 | 12 | Sicilian and Seafood | Seasons and Regions Seafood Grill | Portland, Oregon | June 19, 2020 |
| 431 | 13 | Flavortown International | Krakatoa | Hollywood, Florida | July 10, 2020 |
| 431 | 13 | Flavortown International | Güero | Portland, Oregon | July 10, 2020 |
| 431 | 13 | Flavortown International | Travel by Taste | Warr Acres, Oklahoma | July 10, 2020 |

=== Season 32 (2019–20) ===
| Total | Episode | Title | Restaurant | Location | Original Air Date |
|---|---|---|---|---|---|
| 432 | 1 | Creative Creations | Butch & Babes (Closed) | Burlington, Vermont | December 27, 2019 |
| 432 | 1 | Creative Creations | The Fancy Biscuit | Richmond, Virginia | December 27, 2019 |
| 432 | 1 | Creative Creations | Art Is In | Ottawa, Ontario, Canada | December 27, 2019 |
| 433 | 2 | Takeout: Flavortown Comes Home | Panini Pete's | Fairhope, Alabama | April 24, 2020 |
| 433 | 2 | Takeout: Flavortown Comes Home | La Piazza Al Forno | Glendale, Arizona | April 24, 2020 |
| 433 | 2 | Takeout: Flavortown Comes Home | Forte European Tapas Bar & Bistro | Las Vegas, Nevada | April 24, 2020 |
| 433 | 2 | Takeout: Flavortown Comes Home | Grinders Pizza | Kansas City, Missouri | April 24, 2020 |
| 434 | 3 | Takeout: Home Delivery | Catelli's | Geyserville, California | May 1, 2020 |
| 434 | 3 | Takeout: Home Delivery | Tuckaway Tavern & Butchery | Raymond, New Hampshire | May 1, 2020 |
| 434 | 3 | Takeout: Home Delivery | Red Wagon Pizza Company | Minneapolis, Minnesota | May 1, 2020 |
| 434 | 3 | Takeout: Home Delivery | Fresh Catch | Honolulu, Hawaii | May 1, 2020 |
| 435 | 4 | Takeout: Tastier at Home | Voula's Offshore Cafe | Seattle, Washington | May 8, 2020 |
| 435 | 4 | Takeout: Tastier at Home | Pagoda Restaurant | North Pole, Alaska | May 8, 2020 |
| 435 | 4 | Takeout: Tastier at Home | Pizzeria Luigi | San Diego, California | May 8, 2020 |
| 435 | 4 | Takeout: Tastier at Home | Mike's City Diner | Boston, Massachusetts | May 8, 2020 |
| 436 | 5 | Takeout: Dinner & Dessert That Delivers | Rino's Place | East Boston, Massachusetts | May 15, 2020 |
| 436 | 5 | Takeout: Dinner & Dessert That Delivers | Momocho | Cleveland, Ohio | May 15, 2020 |
| 436 | 5 | Takeout: Dinner & Dessert That Delivers | Don Antonio By Starita | Manhattan, New York City, New York | May 15, 2020 |
| 436 | 5 | Takeout: Dinner & Dessert That Delivers | Se7en Bites Bakeshop | Orlando, Florida | May 15, 2020 |
| 437 | 6 | Takeout: Funky Finds in 'da House | Funk N Waffles | Syracuse, New York | May 22, 2020 |
| 437 | 6 | Takeout: Funky Finds in 'da House | Lucky's Cafe | Cleveland, Ohio | May 22, 2020 |
| 437 | 6 | Takeout: Funky Finds in 'da House | Pinky's Westside Grill | Charlotte, North Carolina | May 22, 2020 |
| 437 | 6 | Takeout: Funky Finds in 'da House | Gorilla BBQ | Pacifica, California | May 22, 2020 |
| 438 | 7 | Takeout: Cross-Country Delivery | Fox Bros Bar-B-Q | Atlanta, Georgia | May 29, 2020 |
| 438 | 7 | Takeout: Cross-Country Delivery | Krazy Fish | Charlotte, North Carolina | May 29, 2020 |
| 438 | 7 | Takeout: Cross-Country Delivery | Blackbrick | Miami, Florida | May 29, 2020 |
| 438 | 7 | Takeout: Cross-Country Delivery | Hillbilly Hot Dogs | Lesage, West Virginia | May 29, 2020 |
| 439 | 8 | Takeout: Bold Bites Brought Home | Chino Bandido | Phoenix, Arizona | June 5, 2020 |
| 439 | 8 | Takeout: Bold Bites Brought Home | Scully's Tavern | Miami, Florida | June 5, 2020 |
| 439 | 8 | Takeout: Bold Bites Brought Home | North End Caffé | Manhattan Beach, California | June 5, 2020 |
| 439 | 8 | Takeout: Bold Bites Brought Home | The Russian River Pub | Forestville, California | June 5, 2020 |
| 440 | 9 | Filling Up on Philly | Gaul & Co. Malt House | Philadelphia, Pennsylvania | August 21, 2020 |
| 440 | 9 | Filling Up on Philly | Stogie Joes Tavern | Philadelphia, Pennsylvania | August 21, 2020 |
| 440 | 9 | Filling Up on Philly | Hardena Restaurant | Philadelphia, Pennsylvania | August 21, 2020 |
| 441 | 10 | Chicken and Pie | Stone Sisters Pizza Bar | Oklahoma City, Oklahoma | September 18, 2020 |
| 441 | 10 | Chicken and Pie | Yonder | Portland, Oregon | September 18, 2020 |
| 441 | 10 | Chicken and Pie | 3 Sons Brewing Co. | Dania Beach, Florida | September 18, 2020 |
| | 11 | From Vikings to Wings | Viking Soul Food | Portland, Oregon | October 16, 2020 |
| | 11 | From Vikings to Wings | Kababi Cafe | Sunrise, Florida | October 16, 2020 |
| | 11 | From Vikings to Wings | Chick N Beer | Oklahoma City, Oklahoma | October 16, 2020 |
| | 12 | From Authentic to Inventive | Chin's Kitchen | Portland, Oregon | October 30, 2020 |
| | 12 | From Authentic to Inventive | Guyutes | Oklahoma City, Oklahoma | October 30, 2020 |
| | 12 | From Authentic to Inventive | Woodrow’s Sandwich Shop | Philadelphia, Pennsylvania | October 30, 2020 |
| | 13 | Chicken and Briskets | Pounds | Fargo, North Dakota | November 13, 2020 |
| | 13 | Chicken and Briskets | Los Bocados | Parkland, Florida | November 13, 2020 |
| | 13 | Chicken and Briskets | Farmer's Keep | Philadelphia, Pennsylvania | November 13, 2020 |

=== Season 33 (2020–21) ===
| Total | Episode | Title | Restaurant | Location | Original Air Date |
|---|---|---|---|---|---|
| 442 | 1 | Takeout: Worldwide Delivery | La Piazza Al Forno (Closed) | Glendale, Arizona | August 7, 2020 |
| 442 | 1 | Takeout: Worldwide Delivery | Boston Burger Company | Boston, Massachusetts | August 7, 2020 |
| 442 | 1 | Takeout: Worldwide Delivery | Pam's Kitchen | Seattle, Washington | August 7, 2020 |
| 442 | 1 | Takeout: Worldwide Delivery | Nico's Pier 38 | Honolulu, Hawaii | August 7, 2020 |
| 443 | 2 | Takeout: Bringing Comfort Home | Audrey Jane's Pizza Garage | Boulder, Colorado | August 28, 2020 |
| 443 | 2 | Takeout: Bringing Comfort Home | Niko Niko's | Houston, Texas | August 28, 2020 |
| 443 | 2 | Takeout: Bringing Comfort Home | The Grilled Cheeserie | Nashville, Tennessee | August 28, 2020 |
| 443 | 2 | Takeout: Bringing Comfort Home | Uncle Lou's | Memphis, Tennessee | August 28, 2020 |
| 444 | 3 | Takeout: Global Comes Local | Hruska's Kolaches | Salt Lake City, Utah | September 11, 2020 |
| 444 | 3 | Takeout: Global Comes Local | Barrio Cafe | Phoenix, Arizona | September 11, 2020 |
| 444 | 3 | Takeout: Global Comes Local | Maui Fresh Streatery | Kahului, Hawaii | September 11, 2020 |
| 444 | 3 | Takeout: Global Comes Local | Chaps Pit Beef | Baltimore, Maryland | September 11, 2020 |
| 445 | 4 | Takeout: Ordering All Kinds of Flavor | Andreoli – Italian Grocer | Scottsdale, Arizona | September 25, 2020 |
| 445 | 4 | Takeout: Ordering All Kinds of Flavor | Tocabe American Indian Eatery | Denver, Colorado | September 25, 2020 |
| 445 | 4 | Takeout: Ordering All Kinds of Flavor | Trina's Starlite Lounge | Somerville, Massachusetts | September 25, 2020 |
| 445 | 4 | Takeout: Ordering All Kinds of Flavor | The Alley Restaurant at Aiea Bowl | Aiea, Hawaii | September 25, 2020 |
| 446 | 5 | South Dakota Smorgasbord | Urban Chislic (Closed) | Sioux Falls, South Dakota | January 1, 2021 |
| 446 | 5 | South Dakota Smorgasbord | Lalibela | Sioux Falls, South Dakota | January 1, 2021 |
| 446 | 5 | South Dakota Smorgasbord | "O" So Good Restaurant (Closed) | Garretson, South Dakota | January 1, 2021 |
| 447 | 6 | Spicin' Things Up | Bread & Circus Sandwich Kitchen | Sioux Falls, South Dakota | January 8, 2021 |
| 447 | 6 | Spicin' Things Up | The Hungry Robot | Fairbanks, Alaska | January 8, 2021 |
| 447 | 6 | Spicin' Things Up | Passage to India | Fargo, North Dakota | January 8, 2021 |
| 448 | 7 | Savory Meat and a Little Sweet | Look's Marketplace | Sioux Falls, South Dakota | January 29, 2021 |
| 448 | 7 | Savory Meat and a Little Sweet | Nichole's Fine Pastry & Cafe | Fargo, North Dakota | January 29, 2021 |
| 448 | 7 | Savory Meat and a Little Sweet | Hari Om Cuisine of India | Fairbanks, Alaska | January 29, 2021 |
| 449 | 8 | Rib-Stickers | Daily Clean Food & Drink | Sioux Falls, South Dakota | February 12, 2021 |
| 449 | 8 | Rib-Stickers | Lavelle's Bistro (Closed) | Fairbanks, Alaska | February 12, 2021 |
| 449 | 8 | Rib-Stickers | Sol Ave. Kitchen | Moorhead, Minnesota | February 12, 2021 |
| 450 | 9 | Alaskan Adventure | Salty's On 2nd | Fairbanks, Alaska | February 26, 2021 |
| 450 | 9 | Alaskan Adventure | Mein Diner Food Truck | Fairbanks, Alaska | February 26, 2021 |
| 450 | 9 | Alaskan Adventure | Jazz Bistro On 4th | Fairbanks, Alaska | February 26, 2021 |
| 451 | 10 | Takeout: Goin' Big and Bringin' Home | Pinky G's Pizzeria | Jackson, Wyoming | March 5, 2021 |
| 451 | 10 | Takeout: Goin' Big and Bringin' Home | Mac & Ernie's Roadside Eatery | Tarpley, Texas | March 5, 2021 |
| 451 | 10 | Takeout: Goin' Big and Bringin' Home | Lauer-Krauts | Brighton, Colorado | March 5, 2021 |
| 452 | 11 | Takeout: Carnivore Delivery | John Mull's Meats and Road Kill Grill | Las Vegas, Nevada | March 19, 2021 |
| 452 | 11 | Takeout: Carnivore Delivery | Buttermilk Kitchen | Atlanta, Georgia | March 19, 2021 |
| 452 | 11 | Takeout: Carnivore Delivery | Hodads | Ocean Beach, California | March 19, 2021 |
| 452 | 11 | Takeout: Carnivore Delivery | Dough Pizzeria Napoletana | San Antonio, Texas | March 19, 2021 |
| 453 | 12 | Takeout: Comin' from All Over the Map | Tacos Chiwas | Phoenix, Arizona | April 9, 2021 |
| 453 | 12 | Takeout: Comin' from All Over the Map | Kenny & Ziggy's | Houston, Texas | April 9, 2021 |
| 454 | 13 | Takeout: Sendin' the Surf & Turf | Pier 23 Cafe | San Francisco, California | April 16, 2021 |
| 454 | 13 | Takeout: Sendin' the Surf & Turf | Flying Mango | Des Moines, Iowa | April 16, 2021 |
| 454 | 13 | Takeout: Sendin' the Surf & Turf | Jitlada Restaurant | Los Angeles, California | April 16, 2021 |

=== Season 34 (2020–22) ===
| Total | Episode | Title | Restaurant | Location | Original Air Date |
|---|---|---|---|---|---|
| 455 | 1 | Pierogis, Pork and Pizza | Mom Mom's Kitchen | Philadelphia, Pennsylvania | November 20, 2020 |
| 455 | 1 | Pierogis, Pork and Pizza | J28 Sandwich Bar | Hollywood, Florida | November 20, 2020 |
| 455 | 1 | Pierogis, Pork and Pizza | Blackbird Woodfire | Fargo, North Dakota | November 20, 2020 |
| 456 | 2 | Takeout: Best of the West Roundup | Paradise Valley Burger Co. | Phoenix, Arizona | May 21, 2021 |
| 456 | 2 | Takeout: Best of the West Roundup | Otto's Sausage Kitchen | Portland, Oregon | May 21, 2021 |
| 456 | 2 | Takeout: Best of the West Roundup | La Texanita | Santa Rosa, California | May 21, 2021 |
| 457 | 3 | Takeout: All Over the Menu | Pies 'N' Thighs | Brooklyn, New York | June 4, 2021 |
| 457 | 3 | Takeout: All Over the Menu | La Scarola | Chicago, Illinois | June 4, 2021 |
| 457 | 3 | Takeout: All Over the Menu | Island Frydays | Cincinnati, Ohio | June 4, 2021 |
| 457 | 3 | Takeout: All Over the Menu | Jimmy's Famous Seafood | Baltimore, Maryland | June 4, 2021 |
| 458 | 4 | Takeout: Real Deal Delivery | Bludso's Bar & Que | Los Angeles, California | June 11, 2021 |
| 458 | 4 | Takeout: Real Deal Delivery | The Wild Thaiger | Phoenix, Arizona | June 11, 2021 |
| 458 | 4 | Takeout: Real Deal Delivery | Broders' Cucina Italiana | Minneapolis, Minnesota | June 11, 2021 |
| 458 | 4 | Takeout: Real Deal Delivery | Sonny's Famous Steak Hogies | Hollywood, Florida | June 11, 2021 |
| 459 | 5 | Takeout: Shipped, Sweet & Savory | Maria Empanada | Denver, Colorado | June 25, 2021 |
| 459 | 5 | Takeout: Shipped, Sweet & Savory | Crepe Expectations | Las Vegas, Nevada | June 25, 2021 |
| 459 | 5 | Takeout: Shipped, Sweet & Savory | Louie Mueller's Barbecue | Taylor, Texas | June 25, 2021 |
| 459 | 5 | Takeout: Shipped, Sweet & Savory | Little Jewel of New Orleans | Los Angeles, California | June 25, 2021 |
| 460 | 6 | Pasta, Potatoes and Pescatarian | Herbie's Bar & Chowder House | Marathon, Florida | April 30, 2021 |
| 460 | 6 | Pasta, Potatoes and Pescatarian | Cholo Soy Cocina | West Palm Beach, Florida | April 30, 2021 |
| 460 | 6 | Pasta, Potatoes and Pescatarian | Rustica | Moorhead, Minnesota | April 30, 2021 |
| 461 | 7 | Pig's Feet, Mojo and Chow-Chow | Coolinary Cafe | Palm Beach Gardens, Florida | July 16, 2021 |
| 461 | 7 | Pig's Feet, Mojo and Chow-Chow | Irie Island Eats | Marathon, Florida | July 16, 2021 |
| 461 | 7 | Pig's Feet, Mojo and Chow-Chow | Joey's Kitchen | Lahaina, Hawaii | July 16, 2021 |
| 462 | 8 | Taste of the Tropics | Castaway Waterfront Restaurant & Sushi Bar | Marathon, Florida | July 30, 2021 |
| 462 | 8 | Taste of the Tropics | South Maui Fish Company | Kihei, Hawaii | July 30, 2021 |
| 462 | 8 | Taste of the Tropics | Le Yellow Sub | Hilo, Hawaii | July 30, 2021 |
| 463 | 9 | Mouthwatering Meat | The Butcher Shop Beer Garden & Grill (Closed) | West Palm Beach, Florida | August 13, 2021 |
| 463 | 9 | Mouthwatering Meat | Traveler's Table | Houston, Texas | August 13, 2021 |
| 463 | 9 | Mouthwatering Meat | Cafe Pesto | Hilo, Hawaii | August 13, 2021 |
| 464 | 10 | Cookin' from Scratch | Weights + Measures | Houston, Texas | September 3, 2021 |
| 464 | 10 | Cookin' from Scratch | Fresco Cafe Italiano (Closed) | Houston, Texas | September 3, 2021 |
| 464 | 10 | Cookin' from Scratch | Hilo Bay Cafe | Hilo, Hawaii | September 3, 2021 |
| 465 | 11 | Domestic & Abroad | NW Sausage and Deli | Centralia, Washington | September 17, 2021 |
| 465 | 11 | Domestic & Abroad | Be More Pacific | Houston, Texas | September 17, 2021 |
| 465 | 11 | Domestic & Abroad | Matteo's Osteria | Wailea, Hawaii | September 17, 2021 |
| 466 | 12 | Regional Flavors | The Toasted Coconut | Houston, Texas | October 1, 2021 |
| 466 | 12 | Regional Flavors | Mackinaw's Restaurant | Chehalis, Washington | October 1, 2021 |
| 466 | 12 | Regional Flavors | Zydeco Kitchen & Cocktails | Bend, Oregon | October 1, 2021 |
| 467 | 13 | Meat and Heat | Once Upon A Thyme | Chehalis, Washington | October 15, 2021 |
| 467 | 13 | Meat and Heat | The Pit Room | Houston, Texas | October 15, 2021 |
| 467 | 13 | Meat and Heat | Soy Bistro | Brentwood, Tennessee | October 15, 2021 |
| 468 | 14 | Sandwiches and Spice | Riddim N Spice | Nashville, Tennessee | October 22, 2021 |
| 468 | 14 | Sandwiches and Spice | Rockin' Dave's Bagel Bistro (Closed) | Bend, Oregon | October 22, 2021 |
| 468 | 14 | Sandwiches and Spice | Arempa's | Salt Lake City, Utah | October 22, 2021 |
| 469 | 15 | Traditional Twists | Nicky's Coal Fired | Nashville, Tennessee | November 5, 2021 |
| 469 | 15 | Traditional Twists | Dump City Dumplings | Bend, Oregon | November 5, 2021 |
| 469 | 15 | Traditional Twists | Papito Moe's | West Jordan, Utah | November 5, 2021 |
| 470 | 16 | Tacos, Tots and Chops | The Feisty Pint | Grand Junction, Colorado | November 19, 2021 |
| 470 | 16 | Tacos, Tots and Chops | Fattoush Cafe | Nashville, Tennessee | November 19, 2021 |
| 470 | 16 | Tacos, Tots and Chops | Santo Taco | Salt Lake City, Utah | November 19, 2021 |
| 471 | 17 | Classic and Comfort | 59er Diner | Leavenworth, Washington | November 26, 2021 |
| 471 | 17 | Classic and Comfort | Sauce Boss Southern Kitchen | Draper, Utah | November 26, 2021 |
| 471 | 17 | Classic and Comfort | Graze Nashville | Nashville, Tennessee | November 26, 2021 |
| 472 | 18 | From Europe to Asia | Kobe Japanese Restaurant | Millcreek, Utah | January 28, 2022 |
| 472 | 18 | From Europe to Asia | il Bistro Italiano | Grand Junction, Colorado | January 28, 2022 |
| 472 | 18 | From Europe to Asia | Red Rock Deli | Albuquerque, New Mexico | January 28, 2022 |

=== Season 35 (2021–22) ===
| Total | Episode | Title | Restaurant | Location | Original Air Date |
|---|---|---|---|---|---|
| 473 | 1 | Chicken 'Cross the Globe | Curry Fried Chicken | Salt Lake City, Utah | December 17, 2021 |
| 473 | 1 | Chicken 'Cross the Globe | Frank's Famous Chicken & Waffles | Albuquerque, New Mexico | December 17, 2021 |
| 473 | 1 | Chicken 'Cross the Globe | TacoParty | Grand Junction, Colorado | December 17, 2021 |
| 474 | 2 | Asian and American | Seoul Casa | Anchorage, Alaska | February 25, 2022 |
| 474 | 2 | Asian and American | Hickory House Ribs | Aspen, Colorado | February 25, 2022 |
| 474 | 2 | Asian and American | Kitsune | Albuquerque, New Mexico | February 25, 2022 |
| 475 | 3 | Meaty, Cheesy and Sweet | Waffles and Whatnot | Anchorage, Alaska | March 4, 2022 |
| 475 | 3 | Meaty, Cheesy and Sweet | Highlands Alehouse | Aspen, Colorado | March 4, 2022 |
| 475 | 3 | Meaty, Cheesy and Sweet | Guava Tree Cafe | Albuquerque, New Mexico | March 4, 2022 |
| 476 | 4 | From Appetizers to Dessert | J's Prairie Rose | Laramie, Wyoming | March 11, 2022 |
| 476 | 4 | From Appetizers to Dessert | The Acre (Closed) | Albuquerque, New Mexico | March 11, 2022 |
| 476 | 4 | From Appetizers to Dessert | Haute Quarter Grill | Anchorage, Alaska | March 11, 2022 |
| 477 | 5 | Gettin' Funky in Flavortown | Born in a Barn | Laramie, Wyoming | March 18, 2022 |
| 477 | 5 | Gettin' Funky in Flavortown | Sweet Melissa | Laramie, Wyoming | March 18, 2022 |
| 477 | 5 | Gettin' Funky in Flavortown | Tequila 61 | Anchorage, Alaska | March 18, 2022 |
| 478 | 6 | From Italian to Asian | Coda Bakery | Albuquerque, New Mexico | March 25, 2022 |
| 478 | 6 | From Italian to Asian | Crowbar & Grill | Laramie, Wyoming | March 25, 2022 |
| 478 | 6 | From Italian to Asian | Originale | Anchorage, Alaska | March 25, 2022 |
| 479 | 7 | Pickin' Up and Chowin' Down | Alibi Wood Fire | Laramie, Wyoming | April 15, 2022 |
| 479 | 7 | Pickin' Up and Chowin' Down | Rowley Inn | Cleveland, Ohio | April 15, 2022 |
| 479 | 7 | Pickin' Up and Chowin' Down | Ray's Place | Anchorage, Alaska | April 15, 2022 |
| 480 | 8 | Food Network Super Chefs | Chaatable (Closed) | Nashville, Tennessee | April 29, 2022 |
| 480 | 8 | Food Network Super Chefs | Mabel's BBQ | Cleveland, Ohio | April 29, 2022 |
| 481 | 9 | Plating Up Puerto Rico | Mercado La Carreta | San Juan, Puerto Rico | May 6, 2022 |
| 481 | 9 | Plating Up Puerto Rico | El Grifo | Caguas, Puerto Rico | May 6, 2022 |
| 481 | 9 | Plating Up Puerto Rico | El Fogon De La 31 | Juncos, Puerto Rico | May 6, 2022 |
| 482 | 10 | Chicken, Steak and Cake | Budare | San Juan, Puerto Rico | May 20, 2022 |
| 482 | 10 | Chicken, Steak and Cake | Double Dub's | Laramie, Wyoming | May 20, 2022 |
| 482 | 10 | Chicken, Steak and Cake | Mason's Creamery | Cleveland, Ohio | May 20, 2022 |
| 483 | 11 | Flavor Expedition | Salao Tapas & Bar | Caguas, Puerto Rico | May 27, 2022 |
| 483 | 11 | Flavor Expedition | Haldi Chowk Indian Bistro | Middletown, New Jersey | May 27, 2022 |
| 483 | 11 | Flavor Expedition | Fat Cats | Cleveland, Ohio | May 27, 2022 |
| 484 | 12 | Surf & Savory | Orozco's Restaurant | San Juan, Puerto Rico | July 8, 2022 |
| 484 | 12 | Surf & Savory | Turf Surf & Earth | Somerville, New Jersey | July 8, 2022 |
| 484 | 12 | Surf & Savory | Astoria Cafe & Market | Cleveland, Ohio | July 8, 2022 |
| 485 | 13 | From Chicken to Chiles | Good Company | Cleveland, Ohio | July 15, 2022 |
| 485 | 13 | From Chicken to Chiles | The Chubby Pickle | Highlands, New Jersey | July 15, 2022 |
| 485 | 13 | From Chicken to Chiles | Chúla Artisan Eatery | La Quinta, California | July 15, 2022 |
| 486 | 14 | Cruisin' Coast to Coast | Pablo's Tacos & Beer | Indio, California | July 29, 2022 |
| 486 | 14 | Cruisin' Coast to Coast | Moo Yai Thai | Sea Bright, New Jersey | July 29, 2022 |
| 486 | 14 | Cruisin' Coast to Coast | Big Pinks BBQ | Bridgewater Township, New Jersey | July 29, 2022 |
| 487 | 15 | Stellar Sandwiches and Big-Time Burgers | The Real Italian Deli | Palm Desert, California | August 5, 2022 |
| 487 | 15 | Stellar Sandwiches and Big-Time Burgers | Gastro Grind Burgers | Palm Desert, California | August 5, 2022 |
| 487 | 15 | Stellar Sandwiches and Big-Time Burgers | East Side Banh Mi | Nashville, Tennessee | August 5, 2022 |
| 488 | 16 | Cheese and Meat | Joe's Meat Market | South Bound Brook, New Jersey | August 12, 2022 |
| 488 | 16 | Cheese and Meat | Homegrown Taproom & Kitchen | Nashville, Tennessee | August 12, 2022 |
| 488 | 16 | Cheese and Meat | Pie Town Tacos | Nashville, Tennessee | August 12, 2022 |
| 489 | 17 | From Chicken to Cheesesteak | El Mirasol Cocina Mexicana | Palm Springs, California | August 26, 2022 |
| 489 | 17 | From Chicken to Cheesesteak | Gabino's Creperie | Palm Springs, California | August 26, 2022 |
| 489 | 17 | From Chicken to Cheesesteak | King Tut's | Nashville, Tennessee | August 26, 2022 |

=== Season 36 (2022–23) ===
| Total | Episode | Title | Restaurant | Location | Original Air Date |
|---|---|---|---|---|---|
| 490 | 1 | Burger, Bird and Meaty Italian | Panheads Pizzeria | New Smyrna Beach, Florida | September 9, 2022 |
| 490 | 1 | Burger, Bird and Meaty Italian | The Garlic | New Smyrna Beach, Florida | September 9, 2022 |
| 490 | 1 | Burger, Bird and Meaty Italian | Bottle Cap | Nashville, Tennessee | September 9, 2022 |
| 491 | 2 | Stuffed, Smoked and Wrapped | Redheaded Stranger | Nashville, Tennessee | September 16, 2022 |
| 491 | 2 | Stuffed, Smoked and Wrapped | Millie's Restaurant & Catering | Daytona Beach Shores, Florida | September 16, 2022 |
| 491 | 2 | Stuffed, Smoked and Wrapped | Arepita Beach | Daytona Beach, Florida | September 16, 2022 |
| 492 | 3 | Eastern Southern | Moat Mountain | North Conway, New Hampshire | September 30, 2022 |
| 492 | 3 | Eastern Southern | Amos Mosquito's | Atlantic Beach, North Carolina | September 30, 2022 |
| 492 | 3 | Eastern Southern | Rose Villa Southern Table & Bar | Ormond Beach, Florida | September 30, 2022 |
| 493 | 4 | Rolled and Holed | Big Dave's Bagels & Deli | North Conway, New Hampshire | October 7, 2022 |
| 493 | 4 | Rolled and Holed | Floyd's 1921 Restaurant, Bar & Catering | Morehead City, North Carolina | October 7, 2022 |
| 493 | 4 | Rolled and Holed | Third Wave Cafe | New Smyrna Beach, Florida | October 7, 2022 |
| 494 | 5 | Beef and Bird | Barley & Salt Tap House and Kitchen | North Conway, New Hampshire | November 4, 2022 |
| 494 | 5 | Beef and Bird | Shepard Barbecue | Emerald Isle, North Carolina | November 4, 2022 |
| 494 | 5 | Beef and Bird | Ranchos Plaza Grill | Ranchos de Taos, New Mexico | November 4, 2022 |
| 495 | 6 | Not-Your-Everyday, All Day | Kindred | San Diego, California | November 11, 2022 |
| 495 | 6 | Not-Your-Everyday, All Day | Gutiz | Taos, New Mexico | November 11, 2022 |
| 495 | 6 | Not-Your-Everyday, All Day | Antonio's The Taste of Mexico | Taos, New Mexico | November 11, 2022 |
| 496 | 7 | Culinary Adventure | Tuetano Taqueria | San Diego, California | November 25, 2022 |
| 496 | 7 | Culinary Adventure | Shawarma Guys | San Diego, California | November 25, 2022 |
| 496 | 7 | Culinary Adventure | Donabe Asian Kitchen (Closed) | Taos, New Mexico | November 25, 2022 |
| 497 | 8 | Thai, Pie and Fries | Sovereign Thai | San Diego, California | December 16, 2022 |
| 497 | 8 | Thai, Pie and Fries | Aly's Eats | Arroyo Seco, New Mexico | December 16, 2022 |
| 497 | 8 | Thai, Pie and Fries | ACEQ Restaurant | Arroyo Seco, New Mexico | December 16, 2022 |
| 498 | 9 | West Coast Wonders | Nutmeg Bakery & Cafe | San Diego, California | January 6, 2023 |
| 498 | 9 | West Coast Wonders | NOLA on 5th | San Diego, California | January 6, 2023 |
| 498 | 9 | West Coast Wonders | Roof 106 | Healdsburg, California | January 6, 2023 |
| 499 | 10 | Smoker, Stove and Skewer | The Chef's Touch BBQ Rig | Santa Ynez, California | January 13, 2023 |
| 499 | 10 | Smoker, Stove and Skewer | Chickpeas Mediterranean Cafe | Las Vegas, Nevada | January 13, 2023 |
| 499 | 10 | Smoker, Stove and Skewer | Bossie's Kitchen | Santa Barbara, California | January 13, 2023 |
| 500 | 11 | Interesting Italian | Bettina | Santa Barbara, California | January 27, 2023 |
| 500 | 11 | Interesting Italian | Marsigliano's | Las Vegas, Nevada | January 27, 2023 |
| 500 | 11 | Interesting Italian | No Butcher (Closed) | Las Vegas, Nevada | January 27, 2023 |
| 501 | 12 | All-Over Flavor | House of Dutch Pot | Las Vegas, Nevada | February 17, 2023 |
| 501 | 12 | All-Over Flavor | The Blue Owl | Santa Barbara, California | February 17, 2023 |
| 501 | 12 | All-Over Flavor | The Rebel House (Closed) | Boca Raton, Florida | February 17, 2023 |

=== Season 37 (2023) ===
| Total | Episode | Title | Restaurant | Location | Original Air Date |
|---|---|---|---|---|---|
| 502 | 1 | Chicken and Ribs | Shalhoob's Funk Zone Patio | Santa Barbara, California | March 3, 2023 |
| 502 | 1 | Chicken and Ribs | Rose's Daughter | Delray Beach, Florida | March 3, 2023 |
| 502 | 1 | Chicken and Ribs | What's Zaap? Thai Food | Las Vegas, Nevada | March 3, 2023 |
| 503 | 2 | Meat and Sweet | Secret Bao | Santa Barbara, California | March 10, 2023 |
| 503 | 2 | Meat and Sweet | The Butcher & The Bar (Closed) | Boynton Beach, Florida | March 10, 2023 |
| 503 | 2 | Meat and Sweet | Cheffrey Eats | Boca Raton, Florida | March 10, 2023 |
| 504 | 3 | Mexican, Mediterranean and Mofongo | Hellenic Republic | Coral Springs, Florida | March 17, 2023 |
| 504 | 3 | Mexican, Mediterranean and Mofongo | La Cosinita Latina | West Palm Beach, Florida | March 17, 2023 |
| 504 | 3 | Mexican, Mediterranean and Mofongo | Letty's de Leticia's Cocina | Las Vegas, Nevada | March 17, 2023 |
| 505 | 4 | A World of Meat | Big Lee's BBQ | Ocala, Florida | March 31, 2023 |
| 505 | 4 | A World of Meat | Alyonka Russian Cuisine | Boise, Idaho | March 31, 2023 |
| 505 | 4 | A World of Meat | Taj Mahal Homestyle Indian and Pakistani Cuisine | Boise, Idaho | March 31, 2023 |
| 506 | 5 | Pick-Me-Ups | Tango's Empanadas | Boise, Idaho | April 14, 2023 |
| 506 | 5 | Pick-Me-Ups | Saint Lawrence Gridiron | Boise, Idaho | April 14, 2023 |
| 506 | 5 | Pick-Me-Ups | Big Bon | Savannah, Georgia | April 14, 2023 |
| 507 | 6 | Seafood, Spice & Soul | Sea Wolf Tybee | Tybee Island, Georgia | April 28, 2023 |
| 507 | 6 | Seafood, Spice & Soul | Sisters of the New South | Savannah, Georgia | April 28, 2023 |
| 507 | 6 | Seafood, Spice & Soul | Sunshine Spice Bakery & Cafe | Boise, Idaho | April 28, 2023 |
| 508 | 7 | Down South & South of the Border | Sundae Cafe at Tybee | Tybee Island, Georgia | May 19, 2023 |
| 508 | 7 | Down South & South of the Border | Madre - Boutique Taqueria | Boise, Idaho | May 19, 2023 |
| 508 | 7 | Down South & South of the Border | The Garage at Victory North | Savannah, Georgia | May 19, 2023 |
| 509 | 8 | Sloppy, Saucy and Stuffed | La Pupusa Urban Eatery | Los Angeles, California | July 7, 2023 |
| 509 | 8 | Sloppy, Saucy and Stuffed | Anita's Kitchen Gourmet Indian Food | Bend, Oregon | July 7, 2023 |
| 509 | 8 | Sloppy, Saucy and Stuffed | Chazito's Latin Cuisine | Pooler, Georgia | July 7, 2023 |
| 510 | 9 | Top-Notch Toppings | Lucius Q | Cincinnati, Ohio | July 28, 2023 |
| 510 | 9 | Top-Notch Toppings | A Broken Angel | Bend, Oregon | July 28, 2023 |
| 510 | 9 | Top-Notch Toppings | South End | Venice, Los Angeles, California | July 28, 2023 |
| 511 | 10 | Stuffed, Sandwiched and Souped | Tacos Y Birria La Unica | Los Angeles, California | August 4, 2023 |
| 511 | 10 | Stuffed, Sandwiched and Souped | The Governor | Milford, Ohio | August 4, 2023 |
| 511 | 10 | Stuffed, Sandwiched and Souped | Big Ski's Pierogis | Bend, Oregon | August 4, 2023 |
| 512 | 11 | Dumpling-icious | Kiki College Hill (Closed) | Cincinnati, Ohio | August 18, 2023 |
| 512 | 11 | Dumpling-icious | High Camp Taphouse | Sisters, Oregon | August 18, 2023 |
| 512 | 11 | Dumpling-icious | Marouch Restaurant | Los Angeles, California | August 18, 2023 |
| 513 | 12 | Tasty Time Travel | Schoolhouse Restaurant | Camp Dennison, Ohio | August 25, 2023 |
| 513 | 12 | Tasty Time Travel | Grace and Hammer Pizzeria | Redmond, Oregon | August 25, 2023 |
| 513 | 12 | Tasty Time Travel | The Stamford Diner | Stamford, Connecticut | August 25, 2023 |

=== Season 38 (2023–24) ===
| Total | Episode | Title | Restaurant | Location | Original Air Date |
|---|---|---|---|---|---|
| 514 | 1 | From Chicken to Caribbean | Feast Food Company | Redmond, Oregon | September 1, 2023 |
| 514 | 1 | From Chicken to Caribbean | Dirty Birds | Omaha, Nebraska | September 1, 2023 |
| 514 | 1 | From Chicken to Caribbean | Big Jays Place | Cincinnati, Ohio | September 1, 2023 |
| 515 | 2 | Variety of Flavor | Sago | Cincinnati, Ohio | September 8, 2023 |
| 515 | 2 | Variety of Flavor | Rinconcito Salvadoreño | Port Chester, New York | September 8, 2023 |
| 515 | 2 | Variety of Flavor | Izzy's Pizza Bus | Omaha, Nebraska | September 8, 2023 |
| 516 | 3 | Champion Chefs | Black Market Liquor Bar | Studio City, Los Angeles, California | September 15, 2023 |
| 516 | 3 | Champion Chefs | Bokujo Ramen | Rapid City, South Dakota | September 15, 2023 |
| 517 | 4 | From Chicken to Noodles | WD Cravings | Omaha, Nebraska | October 13, 2023 |
| 517 | 4 | From Chicken to Noodles | daybird | Los Angeles, California | October 13, 2023 |
| 517 | 4 | From Chicken to Noodles | Il Pastaficio | Greenwich, Connecticut | October 13, 2023 |
| 518 | 5 | East, South, West | The Noble South | Mobile, Alabama | October 20, 2023 |
| 518 | 5 | East, South, West | Grigg Street Pizza | Greenwich, Connecticut | October 20, 2023 |
| 518 | 5 | East, South, West | Sitti's Table | Cody, Wyoming | October 20, 2023 |
| 519 | 6 | Sandwich-Fest | Kitchen Table | Omaha, Nebraska | October 27, 2023 |
| 519 | 6 | Sandwich-Fest | Southwood Kitchen | Daphne, Alabama | October 27, 2023 |
| 519 | 6 | Sandwich-Fest | Corbo's Southside Deli | Stamford, Connecticut | October 27, 2023 |
| 520 | 7 | Meaty to Meatless | The Hummingbird Way Oyster Bar | Mobile, Alabama | November 10, 2023 |
| 520 | 7 | Meaty to Meatless | Modern Love (Closed) | Omaha, Nebraska | November 10, 2023 |
| 520 | 7 | Meaty to Meatless | Kouzina Greek Taverna and Bar | Stamford, Connecticut | November 10, 2023 |
| 521 | 8 | Wrapped, Pied and Fried | Roosters | Mobile, Alabama | November 17, 2023 |
| 521 | 8 | Wrapped, Pied and Fried | 307pizza | Cody, Wyoming | November 17, 2023 |
| 521 | 8 | Wrapped, Pied and Fried | Block 16 | Omaha, Nebraska | November 17, 2023 |
| 522 | 9 | Flavor Explosion | Front Yard Tacos | Mobile, Alabama | December 8, 2023 |
| 522 | 9 | Flavor Explosion | Saffron Street | Calgary, Alberta, Canada | December 8, 2023 |
| 522 | 9 | Flavor Explosion | Nic's On Beverly | Los Angeles, California | December 8, 2023 |
| 523 | 10 | Southern, Western and North of the Border | Pie Zanos | Buffalo, Wyoming | December 15, 2023 |
| 523 | 10 | Southern, Western and North of the Border | Heaven Restaurant Market | Calgary, Alberta, Canada | December 15, 2023 |
| 523 | 10 | Southern, Western and North of the Border | Trap Fusion | Memphis, Tennessee | December 15, 2023 |
| 524 | 11 | From Noodle to Strudel | Bohemian Biergarten | Boulder, Colorado | January 5, 2024 |
| 524 | 11 | From Noodle to Strudel | Calgary Momo House | Calgary, Alberta, Canada | January 5, 2024 |
| 524 | 11 | From Noodle to Strudel | Good Fortune Co. | Memphis, Tennessee | January 5, 2024 |
| 525 | 12 | Hearty Handfuls | Little Bettie Pizza & Snacks | Memphis, Tennessee | January 12, 2024 |
| 525 | 12 | Hearty Handfuls | The Moose and Poncho | Calgary, Alberta, Canada | January 12, 2024 |
| 525 | 12 | Hearty Handfuls | Del Sur Artisan Eats | St. Simons Island, Georgia | January 12, 2024 |
| 526 | 13 | Great Taste, Surprising Place | Salt & Pepper | Calgary, Alberta, Canada | January 26, 2024 |
| 526 | 13 | Great Taste, Surprising Place | Loaf | Memphis, Tennessee | January 26, 2024 |
| 526 | 13 | Great Taste, Surprising Place | The Burns Pub & Restaurant | Broomfield, Colorado | January 26, 2024 |
| 527 | 14 | Soup, Sandwiches and Seafood | Porch | St. Simons Island, Georgia | February 2, 2024 |
| 527 | 14 | Soup, Sandwiches and Seafood | Pure Street Food | Calgary, Alberta, Canada | February 2, 2024 |
| 528 | 15 | Flavor World | Fry Bread House | Phoenix, Arizona | Feb 16, 2024 |
| 528 | 15 | Flavor World | Rincon Argentino | Boulder, Colorado | Feb 16, 2024 |
| 528 | 15 | Flavor World | StickEM | Memphis, Tennessee | Feb 16, 2024 |
| 529 | 16 | Bird, Belly and Beef | Las Tortugas Deli Mexicana | Memphis, Tennessee | February 23, 2024 |
| 529 | 16 | Bird, Belly and Beef | Golden Isles Olive Oil Restaurant | St. Simons Island, Georgia | February 23, 2024 |
| 529 | 16 | Bird, Belly and Beef | Hush Public House | Scottsdale, Arizona | February 23, 2024 |

=== Season 39 (2023–25) ===
| Total | Episode | Title | Restaurant | Location | Original Air Date |
|---|---|---|---|---|---|
| 530 | 1 | Smokin' Southern Decadence | Meat Boss Cottage Hill | Mobile, Alabama | December 29, 2023 |
| 530 | 1 | Smokin' Southern Decadence | LowCountry Steak | Atlanta, Georgia | December 29, 2023 |
| 531 | 2 | French Flavor and Meaty Kabobs | Holy Crepe!! | Boulder, Colorado | March 8, 2024 |
| 531 | 2 | French Flavor and Meaty Kabobs | Julia's Bistro & Bar | San Antonio, Texas | March 8, 2024 |
| 531 | 2 | French Flavor and Meaty Kabobs | Kabob Grill N Go | Phoenix, Arizona | March 8, 2024 |
| 532 | 3 | From the Seas and Overseas | Cracovia Polish-American Restaurant & Bar | Westminster, Colorado | March 15, 2024 |
| 532 | 3 | From the Seas and Overseas | The Jerk Shack | San Antonio, Texas | March 15, 2024 |
| 532 | 3 | From the Seas and Overseas | Indigo Coastal Shanty | Brunswick, Georgia | March 15, 2024 |
| 533 | 4 | From Spicy to Sticky | Dulce Dough Donuts & Bakery | St. Simons Island, Georgia | March 29, 2024 |
| 533 | 4 | From Spicy to Sticky | Barchetta | Boulder, Colorado | March 29, 2024 |
| 533 | 4 | From Spicy to Sticky | Sichuan House | San Antonio, Texas | March 29, 2024 |
| 534 | 5 | Phoenix Food Fans | Tim Finnegan's Irish Restaurant And Pub | Glendale, Arizona | April 5, 2024 |
| 534 | 5 | Phoenix Food Fans | Bonfire Craft Kitchen & Tap House | Tempe, Arizona | April 5, 2024 |
| 534 | 5 | Phoenix Food Fans | CRUjiente Tacos (Closed) | Phoenix, Arizona | April 5, 2024 |
| 535 | 6 | Tortas, Tomatoes and Tequila | Ro-Ho Pork & Bread: Tortas Ahogadas | San Antonio, Texas | December 6, 2024 |
| 535 | 6 | Tortas, Tomatoes and Tequila | Reid's Apothecary | Brunswick, Georgia | December 6, 2024 |
| 536 | 7 | Just Like Mom | Mama's Meatball | San Luis Obispo, California | December 13, 2024 |
| 536 | 7 | Just Like Mom | 10th Street Diner | Indianapolis, Indiana | December 13, 2024 |
| 536 | 7 | Just Like Mom | Con Huevos Tacos | San Antonio, Texas | December 13, 2024 |
| 537 | 8 | Sandwich Smorgasbord | Subito | Indianapolis, Indiana | January 17, 2025 |
| 537 | 8 | Sandwich Smorgasbord | Brooks Burgers SLO | San Luis Obispo, California | January 17, 2025 |
| 537 | 8 | Sandwich Smorgasbord | Wild Barley Kitchen & Brewery | San Antonio, Texas | January 17, 2025 |

=== Season 40 (2024–25) ===
| Total | Episode | Title | Restaurant | Location | Original Air Date |
|---|---|---|---|---|---|
| 538 | 1 | Fistful of Flavor | Petra Mediterranean Pizza and Grill | San Luis Obispo, California | August 2, 2024 |
| 538 | 1 | Fistful of Flavor | Cavé Bistro | Avon-by-the-Sea, New Jersey | August 2, 2024 |
| 538 | 1 | Fistful of Flavor | Che Chori | Indianapolis, Indiana | August 2, 2024 |
| 539 | 2 | From Breakfast to the Boot | Katalina's | Columbus, Ohio | August 16, 2024 |
| 539 | 2 | From Breakfast to the Boot | Source Restaurants | Cambridge, Massachusetts | August 16, 2024 |
| 539 | 2 | From Breakfast to the Boot | Flour House | San Luis Obispo, California | August 16, 2024 |
| 540 | 3 | All Over the Plate | Tlaolli | Indianapolis, Indiana | August 30, 2024 |
| 540 | 3 | All Over the Plate | Skratch Kitchen | Bradley Beach, New Jersey | August 30, 2024 |
| 540 | 3 | All Over the Plate | King Gyros Greek Restaurant | Whitehall, Ohio | August 30, 2024 |
| 54 | 41 | Grand Slam Sammy | Seed to Sprout | Avon-by-the-Sea, New Jersey | September 6, 2024 |
| 54 | 41 | Grand Slam Sammy | Sweet Cheeks Q | Boston, Massachusetts | September 6, 2024 |
| 54 | 41 | Grand Slam Sammy | TASTE! craft eatery | San Luis Obispo, California | September 6, 2024 |
| 542 | 5 | Coast-to-Coast Comfort | Tommy's Diner | Columbus, Ohio | September 20, 2024 |
| 542 | 5 | Coast-to-Coast Comfort | The Spoon Trade | Grover Beach, California | September 20, 2024 |
| 542 | 5 | Coast-to-Coast Comfort | Mutiny BBQ Company | Asbury Park, New Jersey | September 20, 2024 |
| 543 | 6 | Wide World of Chefs | Heights 167 | Point Pleasant Beach, New Jersey | October 4, 2024 |
| 543 | 6 | Wide World of Chefs | Little Donkey | Cambridge, Massachusetts | October 4, 2024 |
| 543 | 6 | Wide World of Chefs | Pa & Ma's Backyard BBQ | Indianapolis, Indiana | October 4, 2024 |
| 544 | 7 | Home Cooked Flavor | Vinal Bakery | Somerville, Massachusetts | October 11, 2024 |
| 544 | 7 | Home Cooked Flavor | High Bank Distillery Co | Columbus, Ohio | October 11, 2024 |
| 544 | 7 | Home Cooked Flavor | His Place Eatery | Indianapolis, Indiana | October 11, 2024 |
| 545 | 8 | Burgers, Bone Marrow & Bangladesh | The Quiet Few | East Boston, Massachusetts | October 18, 2024 |
| 545 | 8 | Burgers, Bone Marrow & Bangladesh | STEPCHLD | Minneapolis, Minnesota | October 18, 2024 |
| 545 | 8 | Burgers, Bone Marrow & Bangladesh | Joya's | Worthington, Ohio | October 18, 2024 |
| 546 | 9 | From Vietnamese to Vegan | Hai Hai | Minneapolis, Minnesota | November 1, 2024 |
| 546 | 9 | From Vietnamese to Vegan | Jersey Shore BBQ | Point Pleasant Beach, New Jersey | November 1, 2024 |
| 546 | 9 | From Vietnamese to Vegan | Tandem Bakery & Cafe | Missoula, Montana | November 1, 2024 |
| 547 | 10 | Meat, Hmong and Mexican | Wario's Beef and Pork | Columbus, Ohio | November 8, 2024 |
| 547 | 10 | Meat, Hmong and Mexican | Union Hmong Kitchen | Minneapolis, Minnesota | November 8, 2024 |
| 547 | 10 | Meat, Hmong and Mexican | Mexican Moose | Missoula, Montana | November 8, 2024 |
| 548 | 11 | All Over Flavor | Ba Lẹ Restaurant | Boston, Massachusetts | November 15, 2024 |
| 548 | 11 | All Over Flavor | Cucina Florabella | Missoula, Montana | November 15, 2024 |
| 548 | 11 | All Over Flavor | Guacaya Bistreaux (Closed) | Minneapolis, Minnesota | November 15, 2024 |
| 549 | 12 | Dough-lightful Dishes | Oro by Nixta | Minneapolis, Minnesota | November 29, 2024 |
| 549 | 12 | Dough-lightful Dishes | Biga Pizza | Missoula, Montana | November 29, 2024 |
| 549 | 12 | Dough-lightful Dishes | Veera Donuts | Missoula, Montana | November 29, 2024 |
| 550 | 13 | Pizza, Latin and Mac | El Mariachi Tequila Bar | Chicago, Illinois | February 7, 2025 |
| 550 | 13 | Pizza, Latin and Mac | Tally Mac Shack | Tallahassee, Florida | February 7, 2025 |
| 550 | 13 | Pizza, Latin and Mac | OG Zaza Pizza Trailer | Minneapolis, Minnesota | February 7, 2025 |
| 551 | 14 | Seafood and Comfort | Little Goat Diner | Chicago, Illinois | January 24, 2025 |
| 551 | 14 | Seafood and Comfort | Coosh's Bayou Rouge Restaurant | Tallahassee, Florida | January 24, 2025 |
| 551 | 14 | Seafood and Comfort | The Rooster Food+Drink | Naples, Florida | January 24, 2025 |
| 552 | 15 | World Tour of Flavor | Molto Trattoria | Naples, Florida | February 14, 2025 |
| 552 | 15 | World Tour of Flavor | Leon's at Lake Ella | Tallahassee, Florida | February 14, 2025 |
| 552 | 15 | World Tour of Flavor | Bites Asian Kitchen + Bar | Chicago, Illinois | February 14, 2025 |

=== Season 41 (2024–25) ===
| Total | Episode | Title | Restaurant | Location | Original Air Date |
|---|---|---|---|---|---|
| 553 | 1 | Funky Fresh | Tortello | Chicago, Illinois | December 27, 2024 |
| 553 | 1 | Funky Fresh | Wally & Buck | Missoula, Montana | December 27, 2024 |
| 553 | 1 | Funky Fresh | Backwoods Crossing | Tallahassee, Florida | December 27, 2024 |
| 554 | 2 | Dallas Dumplings, Florida Fried and Chi-Tacos | Hello Dumpling | Dallas, Texas | February 21, 2025 |
| 554 | 2 | Dallas Dumplings, Florida Fried and Chi-Tacos | Cracklin’ Jacks | Naples, Florida | February 21, 2025 |
| 554 | 2 | Dallas Dumplings, Florida Fried and Chi-Tacos | Omarcito’s Latin Cafe | Chicago, Illinois | February 21, 2025 |
| 555 | 3 | Sauerkraut, Shoyu and Shank | Mykonos Kuzina | Naples, Florida | March 7, 2025 |
| 555 | 3 | Sauerkraut, Shoyu and Shank | Rye | Dallas, Texas | March 7, 2025 |
| 555 | 3 | Sauerkraut, Shoyu and Shank | Monster Ramen | Chicago, Illinois | March 7, 2025 |
| 556 | 4 | African, Sicilian and Sandwiches | Halisi Africa | Tallahassee, Florida | March 14, 2025 |
| 556 | 4 | African, Sicilian and Sandwiches | Sfera Sicilian Street Food | Chicago, Illinois | March 14, 2025 |
| 556 | 4 | African, Sicilian and Sandwiches | Fehrenbacher's Meats & Eats | Gainesville, Florida | March 14, 2025 |
| 557 | 5 | Flavortown Finds | Humble Wood Fire Bagel Shop | Gainesville, Florida | April 4, 2025 |
| 557 | 5 | Flavortown Finds | Phil's Oyster Bar & Seafood Restaurant | Baton Rouge, Louisiana | April 4, 2025 |
| 557 | 5 | Flavortown Finds | The Local Restaurant | Naples, Florida | April 4, 2025 |
| 558 | 6 | Sandwich Shenanigans | Slow Bone BBQ | Dallas, Texas | April 11, 2025 |
| 558 | 6 | Sandwich Shenanigans | The Paper Bag | Gainesville, Florida | April 11, 2025 |
| 558 | 6 | Sandwich Shenanigans | Dempsey's Poboys | Baton Rouge, Louisiana | April 11, 2025 |
| 559 | 7 | Sandwiches, Seafood and Sweets | Iverstine Butcher | Baton Rouge, Louisiana | April 18, 2025 |
| 559 | 7 | Sandwiches, Seafood and Sweets | Uppercrust | Gainesville, Florida | April 18, 2025 |
| 559 | 7 | Sandwiches, Seafood and Sweets | Pineappétit | Tallahassee, Florida | April 18, 2025 |
| 560 | 8 | Specialty Spots | Germain's Chicken Sandwiches | Gainesville, Florida | May 2, 2025 |
| 560 | 8 | Specialty Spots | El Palote Panaderia | Dallas, Texas | May 2, 2025 |
| 560 | 8 | Specialty Spots | Elsie's Plate & Pie | Baton Rouge, Louisiana | May 2, 2025 |
| 561 | 9 | Southeast Standouts | Cou-yon's | Port Allen, Louisiana | May 9, 2025 |
| 561 | 9 | Southeast Standouts | Bingo Deli & Pub | Gainesville, Florida | May 9, 2025 |
| 561 | 9 | Southeast Standouts | Yumbii | Atlanta, Georgia | May 9, 2025 |
| 562 | 10 | Barbecue, Beignets and Barbacoa | Smoke'N Ash BBQ | Arlington, Texas | May 23, 2025 |
| 562 | 10 | Barbecue, Beignets and Barbacoa | The 239 Naples | Naples, Florida | May 23, 2025 |
| 562 | 10 | Barbecue, Beignets and Barbacoa | El Tesoro | Atlanta, Georgia | May 23, 2025 |
| 563 | 11 | All Kinds of Cookin' | The Deer and The Dove | Decatur, Georgia | June 6, 2025 |
| 563 | 11 | All Kinds of Cookin' | Starship Bagel | Lewisville, Texas | June 6, 2025 |
| 563 | 11 | All Kinds of Cookin' | Al Noor Kitchen | Baton Rouge, Louisiana | June 6, 2025 |
| 564 | 12 | Funky Flavors | How Crispy Express | Atlanta, Georgia | June 20, 2025 |
| 564 | 12 | Funky Flavors | Oui Melrose | Los Angeles, California | June 20, 2025 |
| 564 | 12 | Funky Flavors | Cafe Mochiko | Cincinnati, Ohio | June 20, 2025 |

=== Season 42 (2025-2026) ===
| Total | Episode | Title | Restaurant | Location | Original Air Date |
|---|---|---|---|---|---|
| 565 | 1 | Trinidad, Thailand and Italy | Tassa's Roti Shop | Marietta, Georgia | July 11, 2025 |
| 565 | 1 | Trinidad, Thailand and Italy | Mae Malai Thai House of Noodles | Los Angeles, California | July 11, 2025 |
| 565 | 1 | Trinidad, Thailand and Italy | Camporosso | Fort Mitchell, Kentucky | July 11, 2025 |
| 566 | 2 | Sandwiches and Soul | Leftie Lee‘s | Avondale Estates, Georgia | July 25, 2025 |
| 566 | 2 | Sandwiches and Soul | Annie's Soul Delicious | Los Angeles, California | July 25, 2025 |
| 566 | 2 | Sandwiches and Soul | Industry | Austin, Texas | July 25, 2025 |
| 567 | 3 | Flavortown Flavorfest | Donna Jean | Sherman Oaks, Los Angeles, California | August 22, 2025 |
| 567 | 3 | Flavortown Flavorfest | The Pickled Pig | Cincinnati, Ohio | August 22, 2025 |
| 567 | 3 | Flavortown Flavorfest | Lao’d Bar | Austin, Texas | August 22, 2025 |
| 568 | 4 | Soup, Salad and Sorbet Spins | Ramen Del Barrio | Austin, Texas | August 29, 2025 |
| 568 | 4 | Soup, Salad and Sorbet Spins | Northside Yacht Club | Cincinnati, Ohio | August 29, 2025 |
| 568 | 4 | Soup, Salad and Sorbet Spins | Ruen Pair | Los Angeles, California | August 29, 2025 |
| 569 | 5 | Dirty, Crunchy, Sticky and Veggie | Boneyard Bistro | Sherman Oaks, Los Angeles, California | September 19, 2025 |
| 569 | 5 | Dirty, Crunchy, Sticky and Veggie | Sacred Beast Diner | Cincinnati, Ohio | September 19, 2025 |
| 569 | 5 | Dirty, Crunchy, Sticky and Veggie | Bouldin Creek Cafe | Austin, Texas | September 19, 2025 |
| 570 | 6 | Savoring Sicily | Tischi Toschi | Taormina, Messina, Italy | September 26, 2025 |
| 570 | 6 | Savoring Sicily | stritFUD | Taormina, Messina, Italy | September 26, 2025 |
| 570 | 6 | Savoring Sicily | Al Saraceno | Taormina, Messina, Italy | September 26, 2025 |
| 571 | 7 | Sicilian Adventure | Villa Zuccaro Pizzeria | Taormina, Messina, Italy | October 3, 2025 |
| 571 | 7 | Sicilian Adventure | Ethica Chef’s Table | Taormina, Messina, Italy | October 3, 2025 |
| 571 | 7 | Sicilian Adventure | Trattoria da Antonio | Giardini Naxos, Messina, Italy | October 3, 2025 |
| 572 | 8 | Global Mashup | Darwin's Charcoal BBQ Chicken | Calgary, Alberta, Canada | November 21, 2025 |
| 572 | 8 | Global Mashup | KG BBQ | Austin, Texas | November 21, 2025 |
| 572 | 8 | Global Mashup | KungFood Amerasia | Covington, Kentucky | November 21, 2025 |
| 576 | 9 | Smoked, Fried, and Aged | Good Hot Fish | Asheville, North Carolina | March 6, 2026 |
| 576 | 9 | Smoked, Fried, and Aged | Park by Sidewalk Citizen | Calgary, Alberta, Canada | March 6, 2026 |
| 576 | 9 | Smoked, Fried, and Aged | BJ's Barbecue | Sparks, Nevada | March 6, 2026 |
| 580 | 10 | Sloppy, Spicy, and Belly | Angkor | San Jose, California | April 24, 2026 |
| 580 | 10 | Sloppy, Spicy, and Belly | Nixtaco | Roseville, California | April 24, 2026 |
| 580 | 10 | Sloppy, Spicy, and Belly | NEVS Barbecue | Palm Beach Gardens, Florida | April 24, 2026 |
| 581 | 11 | From Bunny Chow to Chicken Oysters | El Halal Amigos | San Jose, California | May 8, 2026 |
| 581 | 11 | From Bunny Chow to Chicken Oysters | Bush Farmhouse | Black Mountain, North Carolina | May 8, 2026 |
| 581 | 11 | From Bunny Chow to Chicken Oysters | Driftwood | Boynton Beach, Florida | May 8, 2026 |
| 582 | 12 | Sandwiches, Sausage & Sweet Snacks | Tropical Smokehouse | West Palm Beach, Florida | May 22, 2026 |
| 582 | 12 | Sandwiches, Sausage & Sweet Snacks | Spoon and Fork | Sacramento, California | May 22, 2026 |
| 582 | 12 | Sandwiches, Sausage & Sweet Snacks | SuperNatural Food & Wine | Tampa, Florida | May 22, 2026 |

=== Season 43 (2026) ===
| Total | Episode | Title | Restaurant | Location | Original Air Date |
|---|---|---|---|---|---|
| 573 | 1 | Pizza, Pastrami, and Potato Skins | Jane Bond BBQ | Calgary, Alberta, Canada | January 23, 2026 |
| 573 | 1 | Pizza, Pastrami, and Potato Skins | R Town Pizza | Reno, Nevada | January 23, 2026 |
| 573 | 1 | Pizza, Pastrami, and Potato Skins | Mum Foods | Austin, Texas | January 23, 2026 |
| 574 | 2 | Southern, Sweets, and Spam | Papa What You Cooking | Reno, Nevada | January 30, 2026 |
| 574 | 2 | Southern, Sweets, and Spam | Pat & Betty | Calgary, Alberta, Canada | January 30, 2026 |
| 574 | 2 | Southern, Sweets, and Spam | Huli Sue's | Asheville, North Carolina | January 30, 2026 |
| 575 | 3 | Hot Dogs, Hot Knots, and Hot Ramen | Foothills Grange | Black Mountain, North Carolina | February 27, 2026 |
| 575 | 3 | Hot Dogs, Hot Knots, and Hot Ramen | Shiki Menya | Calgary, Alberta, Canada | February 27, 2026 |
| 575 | 3 | Hot Dogs, Hot Knots, and Hot Ramen | Smiling with Hope Pizza | Reno, Nevada | February 27, 2026 |
| 577 | 4 | Flavorworld | Moo Dang | Reno, Nevada | March 13, 2026 |
| 577 | 4 | Flavorworld | Namo Cafe Bistro | Calgary, Alberta, Canada | March 13, 2026 |
| 577 | 4 | Flavorworld | Little Chango | Asheville, North Carolina | March 13, 2026 |
| 578 | 5 | Funkalicious | Island Taste Caribbean Grill | San Jose, California | March 27, 2026 |
| 578 | 5 | Funkalicious | MF International | Sparks, Nevada | March 27, 2026 |
| 578 | 5 | Funkalicious | Regina's Westside | Asheville, North Carolina | March 27, 2026 |
| 579 | 6 | Buns, Burgers, and Bolognese | Tasty Dumpling | Sacramento, California | April 10, 2026 |
| 579 | 6 | Buns, Burgers, and Bolognese | Alaina's Cafe | Palm Beach Gardens, Florida | April 10, 2026 |
| 579 | 6 | Buns, Burgers, and Bolognese | Fox Tale Fermentation Project | San Jose, California | April 10, 2026 |
| 584 | 7 | Cajun, Asian, and 'Cue | The Bywater | Los Gatos, California | June 12, 2026 |
| 584 | 7 | Cajun, Asian, and 'Cue | Wok by the Beach | Riviera Beach, Florida | June 12, 2026 |
| 584 | 7 | Cajun, Asian, and 'Cue | Tank House BBQ | Sacramento, California | June 12, 2026 |
| 583 | 8 | Coast to Coast Creations | Pizza Supreme Being | Sacramento, California | May 29, 2026 |
| 583 | 8 | Coast to Coast Creations | Don Ramon Restaurant | West Palm Beach, Florida | May 29, 2026 |
| 583 | 8 | Coast to Coast Creations | Vietnoms | San Jose, California | May 29, 2026 |
| 584 | 9 | Hand to Mouth | Cousin Vinny's Sandwich Co. | Tampa, Florida | July 10, 2026 |
| 584 | 9 | Hand to Mouth | StreetZlan Restaurant | Elk Grove, California | July 10, 2026 |
| 584 | 9 | Hand to Mouth | La Santa Maria Kitchen | Tampa, Florida | July 10, 2026 |
| 585 | 10 | Beef, Chicken, and Pork | Mezzaluna Pasteria | Bentonville, Arkansas | August 7, 2026 |
| 585 | 10 | Beef, Chicken, and Pork | The Boozy Pig | Tampa, Florida | August 7, 2026 |
| 585 | 10 | Beef, Chicken, and Pork | Saiwok Vietnamese Street Food | Rogers, Arkansas | August 7, 2026 |
| 586 | 11 | Smoke, Seafood, and Shawarma | Toot Beirut | Rogers, Arkansas | August 21, 2026 |
| 586 | 11 | Smoke, Seafood, and Shawarma | The Liberty Smokehouse | Tampa, Florida | August 21, 2026 |
| 586 | 11 | Smoke, Seafood, and Shawarma | Blu Fish House | Bentonville, Arkansas | August 21, 2026 |
| 587 | 12 | Beef, Bowls, and Burritos | Lupe's Situ Tacos | Seattle, Washington | September 11, 2026 |
| 587 | 12 | Beef, Bowls, and Burritos | Ramen Nara | Rogers, Arkansas | September 11, 2026 |
| 587 | 12 | Beef, Bowls, and Burritos | Danger Dave's | Bentonville, Arkansas | September 11, 2026 |

=== Season 44 (2026) ===
| Total | Episode | Title | Restaurant | Location | Original Air Date |
|---|---|---|---|---|---|
| 588 | 1 | Sandwiches, Seafood & Soba Noodles | Kamonegi | Seattle, Washington | November 6, 2026 |
| 588 | 1 | Sandwiches, Seafood & Soba Noodles | Wicked Oak BarbeQue | Tampa, Florida | November 6, 2026 |
| 588 | 1 | Sandwiches, Seafood & Soba Noodles | Local Tide | Seattle, Washington | November 6, 2026 |
| 589 | 2 | Northwest, Southeast | Brisket | North Myrtle Beach, South Carolina | November 13, 2026 |
| 589 | 2 | Northwest, Southeast | Mean Sandwich | Seattle, Washington | November 13, 2026 |
| 589 | 2 | Northwest, Southeast | Krave Bagel | North Myrtle Beach, South Carolina | November 13, 2026 |
| 590 | 3 | Fries, Pies, and Taco-fied | | Seattle, Washington | December 4, 2026 |
| 590 | 3 | Fries, Pies, and Taco-fied | | Myrtle Beach, South Carolina | December 4, 2026 |
| 591 | 4 | Guam, Laos and Low Country | | Myrtle Beach, South Carolina | December 11, 2026 |
| 591 | 4 | Guam, Laos and Low Country | | Seattle, Washington | December 11, 2026 |
| 592 | 5 | Butcher, Baker and Pizza Maker | | Seattle, Washington | December 18, 2026 |
| 592 | 5 | Butcher, Baker and Pizza Maker | | Richmond, Virginia | December 18, 2026 |
