= Alexis Restaurant =

Former Greek restaurant in Portland, Oregon, U.S.

- Interactive map of Alexis Restaurant

Restaurant information
- Established: 1981
- Closed: November 7, 2016
- Previous owners: Gerry Tsirimiagos; Alexis Bakouros
- Food type: Greek
- Location: 215 West Burnside Street, Portland, Multnomah, Oregon, 97209, United States
- Coordinates: 45.52345°N 122.67290°W
- Website: www.alexisfoods.com

Alexis Restaurant (sometimes Alexis Greek Restaurant) was a Greek restaurant in Portland, Oregon's Old Town Chinatown neighborhood, in the United States. It was established in 1981 and closed on November 7, 2016.

== Description ==
The family-operated and "family oriented" Greek restaurant operated on West Burnside Street in Portland's Old Town Chinatown neighborhood. The business was housed in a streetcar era commercial style building designed by Harold Marsh and completed in 1926. Fodor's said the interior had white walls and "basic" furnishings. The menu included souvlaki, spanakopita, moussaka, saganaki, braised lamb shanks, fried calamari, dolmathes, and pastitsio.

== History ==
Gerry Tsirimiagos opened Alexis Restaurant in 1981, a few years after immigrating from Greece. The business was the city's first to serve fried calamari.

In 2013, Tsirmiagos said business declined following the establishment of the Right 2 Dream Too encampment. Jim Huffman also commented on how Alexis and nearby businesses were impacted by homeless camps.

In 2015, Matthew Korfhage of Willamette Week said the restaurant's co-owner Alexis Bakouros was among "multiple Greek families who helped keep the center of town vital in the lean Portland '80s and '90s", along with Ted Papaioannou of Berbati's Pan, Ted Papas of Greek Cusina, and George Touhouliotis of Satyricon.

In 2015, Tsirimiagos bought out Bakouros, who continued ownership of Alexis, Inc., a grocery store and catering business that had been affiliated with the restaurant. On November 7, 2016, after operating for 36 years, Alexis Restaurant closed. Tsirimiagos said he was closing the restaurant to focus on his family and traveling. Alexis was replaced with, Nyx, a two-story nightclub that planned to include elements of Greek mythology in its décor as a tribute to the restaurant, and later a strip club. Alexis, Inc. remained open for importing and distributing foods as well as catering.

== Reception ==
According to the Portland Mercury, the magazine Portland Downtowner said Alexis was among the city's best restaurants in 1986. Portland Best Places (1990) called Alexis "a temple of good times that has evolved ... into something far beyond a little Greek eatery". Moon Oregon (2007) said the restaurant offered Oregon's best traditional Greek food.

== See also ==
- List of Greek restaurants
