= Mad Greek Cafe =

Restaurant in Baker, California, U.S.

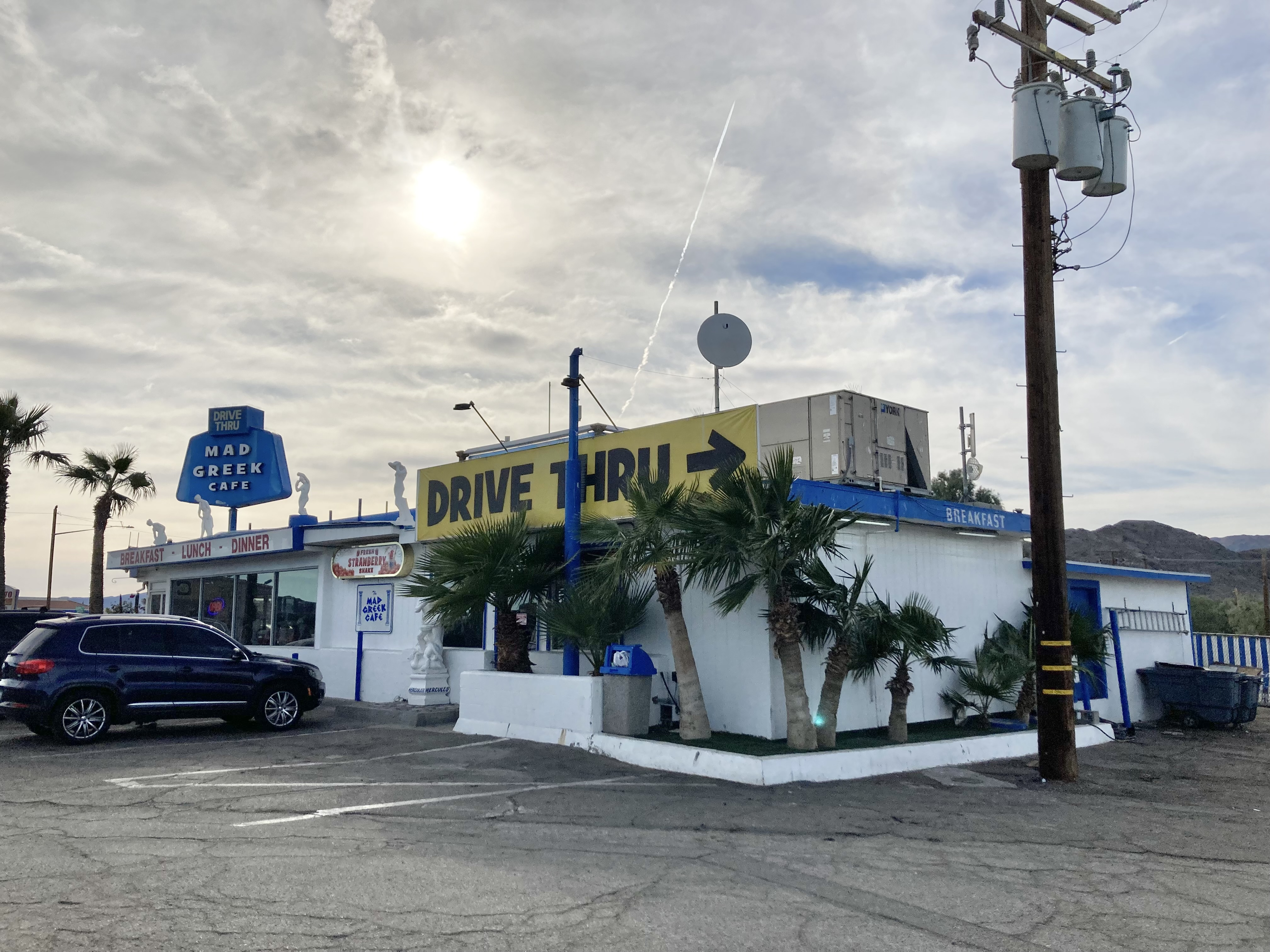
- Interactive map of Mad Greek Cafe

Restaurant information
- Food type: Greek
- Location: 72112 Baker Boulevard, Baker, California, 92309, United States
- Coordinates: 35°15′57″N 116°4′29″W

Mad Greek Cafe is a Greek restaurant in Baker, California. It appeared in the very first episode of Guy Fieri's Diners, Drive-Ins and Dives in 2007.

== See also ==
- List of Diners, Drive-Ins and Dives episodes
- List of Greek restaurants
