= Bluto's =

Greek restaurant in Portland, Oregon, U.S.

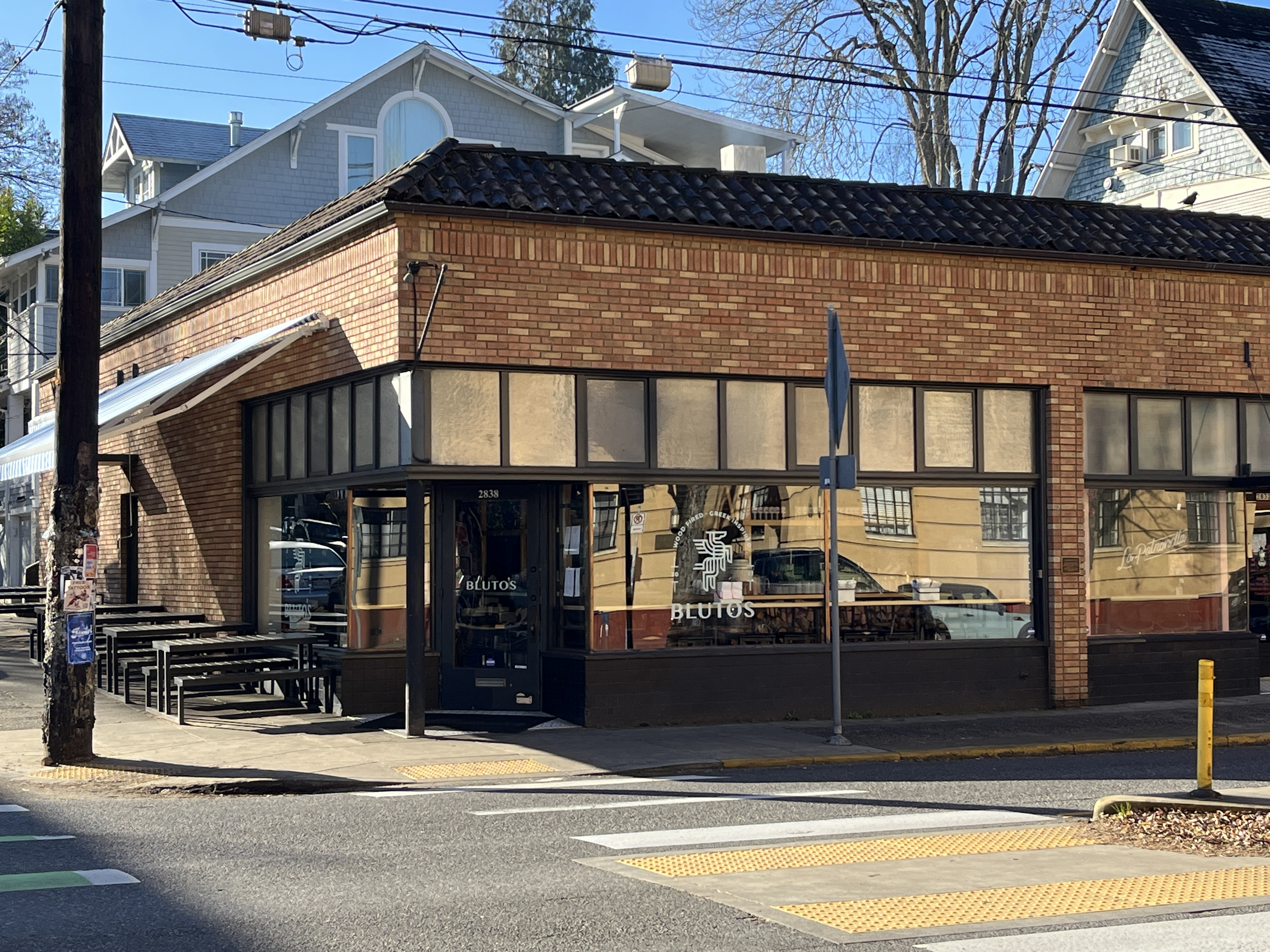
- The restaurant's exterior, 2025
- Interactive map of Bluto's

Restaurant information
- Established: 2022
- Food type: Greek
- Location: 2838 Southeast Belmont Street, Portland, Multnomah, Oregon, 97214, United States
- Coordinates: 45.5163°N 122.6363°W

Bluto's is a Greek restaurant in the Portland metropolitan area, in the United States. The original restaurant is in Portland and an outpost operates in downtown Beaverton.

== Description ==
Named after John Belushi's character in the 1978 comedy film Animal House, Bluto's is a Greek restaurant with two locations in the Portland metropolitan area. In Portland, the business operates on Belmont Street in southeast Portland's Sunnyside neighborhood. A second location operates in Beaverton.

=== Menu ===
The menu includes souvlaki, spinach lentil soup, salads (including a citrus and chicory variety), hummus, pita, and soft serve yogurt (chocolate or vanilla). Sides includes spanakopita hand pies and braised beans. Greek-themed toppings like halvah and honey are available for the ice cream.

== History ==
Established in early 2022, Bluto's operates in the space that previously housed the Japanese restaurant Tonari. The restaurant was established by Rick Gencarelli (Grassa, Lardo) and the ChefStable restaurant group.

A second location operates at Cedar Hills Crossing in Beaverton. It opened in the space that previously housed Afuri.

The restaurant participated in Portland's Dumpling Week in 2026.

== Reception ==
Bluto's ranked sixth on The Oregonian's list of the best new restaurants of 2022. The newspaper's Michael Russell recommended ordering "as much souvlaki, flatbread and hummus as you can eat". He later included the business in the newspaper's 2025 list of the 21 best restaurants in southeast Portland. Russell also ranked Bluto's number 37 in The Oregonian's 2025 list of Portland's 40 best restaurants.

Andrea Damewood included the hummus in the Portland Mercury's "best bites" in Portland in 2022. Emily Harris and Meira Gebel included Bluto's in Axios Portland's overview of the city's best soft serve ice cream. Bluto's was a runner-up in the Best Mediterranean Restaurant category of Willamette Week's annual 'Best of Portland' readers' poll in 2024. It was a finalist in the same category in 2025 and 2026. Hannah Wallace included the business in Condé Nast Traveler's 2025 list of Portland's 23 best restaurants.

== See also ==
- List of Greek restaurants
