= Mad Greek Deli =

Greek restaurant in Portland, Oregon, U.S.

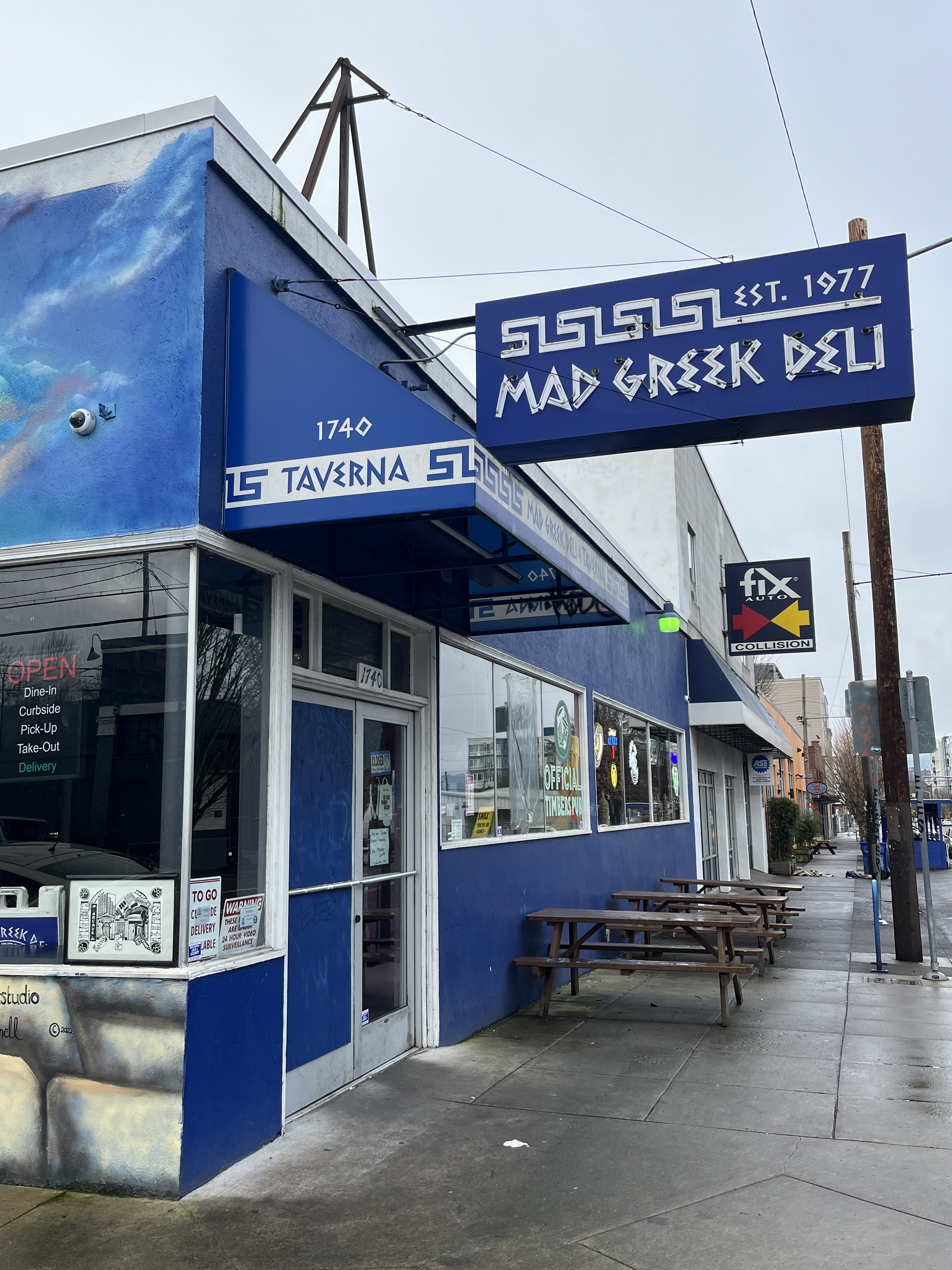
- The restaurant's exterior in 2025
- Interactive map of Mad Greek Deli

Restaurant information
- Established: 1977
- Previous owners: George Athanasakis; Pantelis "Pondo" Kosmas
- Food type: Greek
- Location: 1740 East Burnside Street, Portland, Multnomah, Oregon, 97214, United States
- Coordinates: 45.5228°N 122.6477°W
- Website: madgreekdeli.com

Mad Greek Deli is a Greek restaurant in Portland, Oregon, United States. George Athanasakis opened the original restaurant in Washington County in 1977, and the current location on East Burnside Street in southeast Portland's Buckman neighborhood opened as an outpost in 2012. The original location closed in 2015.

== Description ==
The Greek restaurant Mad Greek Deli operates on East Burnside Street, in southeast Portland's Buckman neighborhood. The restaurant has long hosted members of the Timbers Army and the interior has many Portland Timbers scarves displayed. Mad Greek Deli has hosted musicians.

The menu includes dolmas, sandwiches, spanakopita, moussaka, falafel, gyros, souvlaki, fried chicken, and "Greek fries", or French fries served with pieces of chicken and an "Omega" sauce made of feta, mayonnaise, and Mediterranean spices. The Pondo Tots have feta, oregano, lemon juice, and olive oil.

== History ==
In 1977, George Athanasakis opened the original Mad Greek Deli on Northwest West Union Road in Washington County. The restaurant operated in a building previously known as the Bethany General Merchandise Store, and later the Valley West Grocery and Deli.

Athanasakis's son, Pantelis "Pondo" Kosmas, began working at the restaurant at the age of 19. Kosmas eventually took over ownership of the business. Mad Greek Deli opened an outpost in Buckman in 2012, in the space that previously housed Foti's Greek Deli.

In 2015, the original restaurant closed. Kosmas died in 2016, and the building that had housed the original restaurant was demolished in 2018.

According to Eater Portland, Mad Greek Deli hosted an eating contest in 2014, during which a woman from Nebraska ate a 12-pound sandwich, one pound of fries, and a large soda in 54 minutes.

== Reception ==
Andy Kryza included Mad Greek Deli in Thrillist's 2013 list of Portland's five best "chicken and jojos fixes". In her Food Lovers' Guide to Portland, Oregon (2014), Laurie Wolf recommended the moussaka and spanakopita. In 2015, Wendy Owen of The Oregonian wrote, "In its heyday, the Mad Greek Deli in Rock Creek was the place to eat. The only restaurant in the area, on West Union and Northwest 185th Avenue, it drew everyone from farmers to Intel workers."

In Eater Portland's 2022 overview of "where to find serious Greek food" in the metropolitan area, Maya MacEvoy called Mad Greek Deli a "neighborhood stalwart" that "blends the traditional ... with more free-wheeling dishes". Krista Garcia and Janey Wong included the Pondo Tots in the website's 2024 overview of "where to find tasty totchos and other loaded tots" in the city.

== See also ==
- List of Greek restaurants
