= Mr. D's Greek Delicacies =

Greek restaurant in Seattle, Washington, U.S.

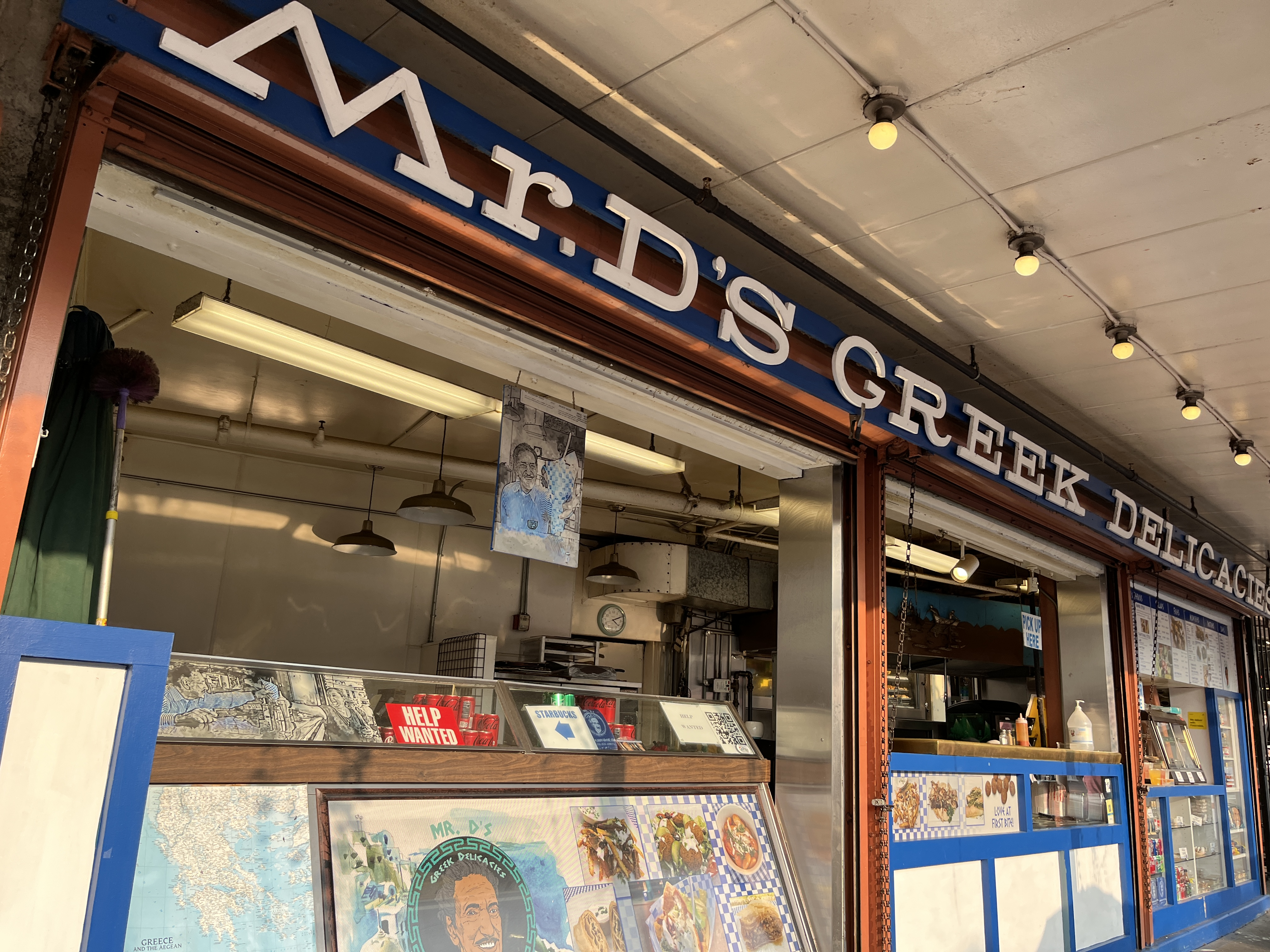
- The restaurant's exterior, 2022
- Interactive map of Mr. D's Greek Delicacies

Restaurant information
- Owner: Demetrios Moraitis
- Food type: Greek
- Location: 1518 Pike Place, Seattle, King, Washington, 98101, United States
- Coordinates: 47.6092°N 122.3412°W
- Website: mrdsgreek.com

Mr. D's Greek Delicacies (sometimes Mr. D's Greek Deli) is a Greek restaurant at Seattle's Pike Place Market, in the U.S. state of Washington.

== Description ==
Mr. D's Greek Delicacies is a Greek restaurant in Pike Place Market's Triangle Building, in Seattle's Central Waterfront district. The menu includes gyros, and the business also sells feta and pita.

== History ==
The business is owned by Demetrios Moraitis, who also owns Mr. D's Greek Restaurant and Lounge. He is known for sculpting famous people out of meat. During the COVID-19 pandemic, the restaurant operated via take-out and delivery, and utilized a "pop-up" patio for outdoor dining.

== Reception ==
Seattle Metropolitan says, "If 'yeeros' at Mr. D's charmingly worn street-eats shop stretch the word delicacies—meat a smidge too salty, tzatziki more like a yogurty ranch dressing—they're still satisfying as hell." In Seattle Magazine's 2013 guide to "cheap eats" in Seattle, Leslie Kelly and Allison Austin Scheff wrote:

Yes, there really is a Mr. D, and Greek-bred Demetrios Moraitis is our hero. (Make that our gyro.) Those wonderfully messy sandwiches are dripping with flavor, especially the lamb 'yeero' ... This walk-up window attracts a huge crowd around lunchtime, but it moves swiftly.

Sonja Groset included Mr. D's in Eater Seattle's 2015 "guide to the best cheap eats" at Pike Place Market.

== See also ==
- List of Greek restaurants
- List of restaurants in Pike Place Market
