= Papa Cristo's =

Former Greek restaurant and market in Los Angeles, California, United States

Coordinates: 34.047433°N 118.299675°W

- Industry: Restaurant
- Founded: October 1948; 77 years ago
- Founder: Sam Chrys
- Defunct: May 4, 2025; 13 months ago
- Fate: Closed
- Headquarters: Los Angeles, California, United States
- Owner: Chrys Chrys
- Website: papacristos.com

Papa Cristo's was a taverna-styled Greek restaurant and market located in the Byzantine-Latino Quarter across the street from Saint Sophia's Church Greek Orthodox Church in Los Angeles, California.

== History ==
Papa Cristo's was founded in October 1948 as an importing and exporting company bringing produce from Greece. The company, which was initially called C & K Importing, was founded by Greek immigrant Sam Chrys. In 1968, Sam Chrys's son Chrys carried on the business and opened a Greek restaurant in addition to the importing business. Chrys eventually traveled across many different parts of Greece in order to attain a better understanding of Greek food and its specialties. In the 1990s, the taverna was opened. The restaurant used ingredients and foods brought directly from Greece through the importing company. In 1990, the restaurant established a catering service which served the Greater Los Angeles area and Orange County. In 2010, Chrys Chrys' youngest daughter Annie joined the management team, becoming the third generation of the family to run the business. On May 4, 2025, Papa Cristo's permanently closed after 77 years in business, due to high rent.

== Restaurant ==
The restaurant featured a "My Big Fat Greek Family-Style Dinner" every Thursday night which included various types of entertainment including live bouzouki performances and belly dancing. Due to its popularity, the event was usually sold-out.

The restaurant served many different types of Greek food and desserts including:

- Chicken and lamb Gyros
- Souvlaki
- Loukaniko
- Falafel
- Tsipoura
- Kefta
- Oktapodakia (Grilled Octopus)
- Loukoumades
- Taramosalata (Greek caviar)
- Gigandes plaki

== Market ==
The market included 3,000 imported goods from Greece such as frappé coffee, olive oil, various ouzo's spanakopita, feta and kasseri cheeses and tiropita. The market also featured dozens of selections of imported Greek wine such as Retsina and Muscat from the island of Samos. The market also featured many Ethiopian foods and products.

== Reception ==
In 2011, Papa Cristo's was awarded Best Greek Restaurant in Los Angeles by Zagat.

It was considered one of the top 7 family styled restaurants in Los Angeles by ABC 7 news in 2007.

In 2010, Los Angeles Magazine featured Papa Cristo's Roasted Lamb and Feta sandwich as one of the top 17 great sandwiches in Los Angeles.

The food appearing in the 2002 film My Big Fat Greek Wedding and the 2003 CBS TV series My Big Fat Greek Life was provided by Papa Cristo's.

Papa Cristo's was featured in the Los Angeles Times as one of "the most delicious deals you'll find around town."

In June 2020, rapper Ja Rule made a commercial for Papa Cristo's as part of the TBS reality show Celebrity Show-Off. The commercial went viral on social media and helped to bring more business to the restaurant so it wouldn't fall victim to the COVID-19 pandemic.

== See also ==
- List of Greek restaurants
