= Pithari Taverna =

Coordinates: 40.500698°N 74.421881°W

- Interactive map of Pithari Taverna

Restaurant information
- Established: September 2006
- Owners: Tassos and Chrisanthe Stefanopoulos
- Food type: Greek
- Location: 28 Woodbridge Avenue, Highland Park, New Jersey, Middlesex County, New Jersey, New Jersey, 08904, United States
- Website: http://www.thepithari.com/

Pithari Taverna is a Greek restaurant located in Highland Park, New Jersey. The restaurant was founded by Tassos and Chrisanthe Stefanopoulo in 2006; the two had gained experience after operating a Greek foods store next door, New Athens Corner.

Reception of the restaurant included multiple favorable reviews in The Star-Ledger, the New Jersey section of The New York Times, and New Jersey Monthly.

== History ==
The restaurant was founded by Tassos and Chrisanthe Stefanopoulos. They gained experience in the food industry by operating a Greek foods shop, called New Athens Corner, and opened the establishment next door in September 2006. The indoor dining room of the facility sat 60 people in 2007. Tassos Stefanopoulos commented to The Star-Ledger on the opening of the restaurant in 2006 that he wished to share the tradition of Greek cuisine with others.

== Cuisine ==
The establishment is a neighborhood restaurant; Greek food is prepared in the form of an open kitchen. Dishes include "grilled octopus in oil, vinegar and oregano ... lamb-and-orzo casserole sealed with Greek cheese and baked" and "yogurt with nuts and honey". Eggplant is a frequent ingredient on the menu at the restaurant. "Ultimate Greek Spread" dishes include "dolmades (grape leaves), tzatziki (yogurt-based sauce), taramosalata (caviar dip), and melitzanosalata (eggplant)". For the recommended seafood option, the restaurant displays the "catch of the day", on ice in the dining room.

== Reception ==
In November 2006, The Star-Ledger highlighted Pithari Taverna as a local Greek restaurant and among "favorite places to eat" in Highland Park, New Jersey. In a December 2006 review of the restaurant for The Star-Ledger, Peter Genovese commented, "The appearance of a Greek restaurant is welcome news enough; the fact that Pithari Taverna serves up top-notch food in a colorful, casual setting is cause for celebration, with or without a bouzouki." A 2007 review in The New York Times included the restaurant in a piece, "Standouts Among the Year's Best", giving the restaurant a rating of "very good". Zagat Survey listed Pithari Taverna as "top listed" in "Greek Tops".

== See also ==
- Greek cuisine
- List of Greek restaurants
