= Greek Cusina =

Defunct pair of restaurants in Oregon, U.S.

Restaurant information
- Closed: 2010
- Owner: Ted Papas
- Location: Portland; Tualatin, Oregon, United States

Greek Cusina was a Greek restaurant with two locations in the Portland metropolitan area, in the United States. The restaurants were located in downtown Portland and Tualatin. Both closed in 2010.

Owner Ted Papas blamed the city for the closure. In 2011, Papas led a protest march to City Hall with approximately 50 participants. According to The Oregonian's Anne Saker, "Wearing a black leather jacket with the embroidered image of the Greek Cusina's iconic purple octopus, Papas accused the city of corruption in its efforts to force adherence to the fire code for the space that housed his 36-year-old restaurant."

The steel, foam, and fabric purple octopus which was displayed on the exterior of the downtown restaurant was relocated to Brick's Barber, and later available on Craigslist.

== See also ==
- List of Greek restaurants
