= Philotimo (restaurant) =

Restaurant in Washington, D.C., U.S.

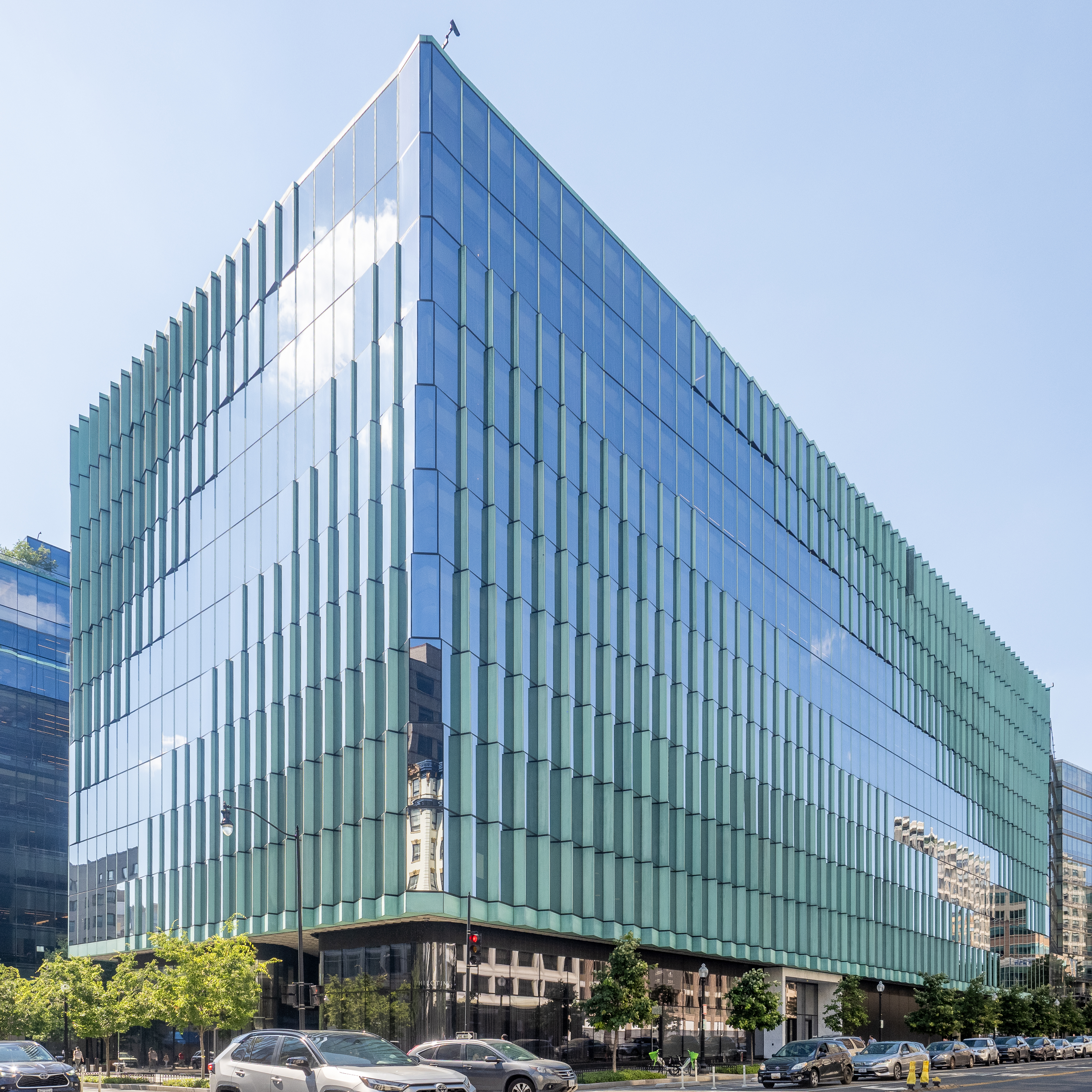
- Philotimo was located on the ground floor corner of Midtown Center in Washington, D.C.
- Interactive map of Philotimo

Restaurant information
- Established: January 22, 2022
- Closed: May 2024
- Chef: Nicholas Stefanelli
- Food type: Greek
- Location: 1100 15th Street NW, Washington, D.C., 20005, United States
- Coordinates: 38°54′14″N 77°2′6″W
- Website: philotimodc.com

Philotimo was a Greek restaurant in Downtown Washington D.C., United States. Nicholas Stefanelli was the chef. Philotimo opened on January 22, 2022, and closed in May 2024.

== See also ==
- List of Greek restaurants
