= Zenon Taverna =

Greek and Cypriot restaurant in Astoria, Queens, New York, U.S.

- Interactive map of Zenon Taverna

Restaurant information
- Established: 1988
- Closed: November 28, 2021
- Food type: Greek; Cypriot
- Location: 34-10 31st Ave,, Astoria, New York, 11106, United States
- Coordinates: 40°45′47″N 73°55′15″W
- Website: zenontaverna.com

Zenon Taverna was a restaurant serving Greek and Cypriot cuisine on 31st Avenue in Astoria, Queens, in the U.S. state of New York.

== History ==
The restaurant launched an online cooking series in February 2021. It closed in 2021.

== Reception ==
Eater New York's Alexandra Ilyashov included Zenon in her 2018 list of "Where to Feast on Greek Food in NYC". The website's Robert Sietsema included the restaurant in his 2020 list of "10 Great Seafood Dishes Still Available in NYC".

== See also ==
- List of defunct restaurants of the United States
- List of Greek restaurants
