= Koutoukia =

Koutoukia (singular: koutouki) are informal or underground restaurants or taverna, typically run by women, in Greece. The typical koutouki has between eight and ten tables and are often run in the owner's house. Some are operated in back yards, gardens, or basements. Traditionally koutoukia served only men.

== See also ==
- Kafenio
