= Niko Niko's =

Greek restaurant in Houston, Texas, U.S.

Coordinates: 29.7465°N 95.3922°W

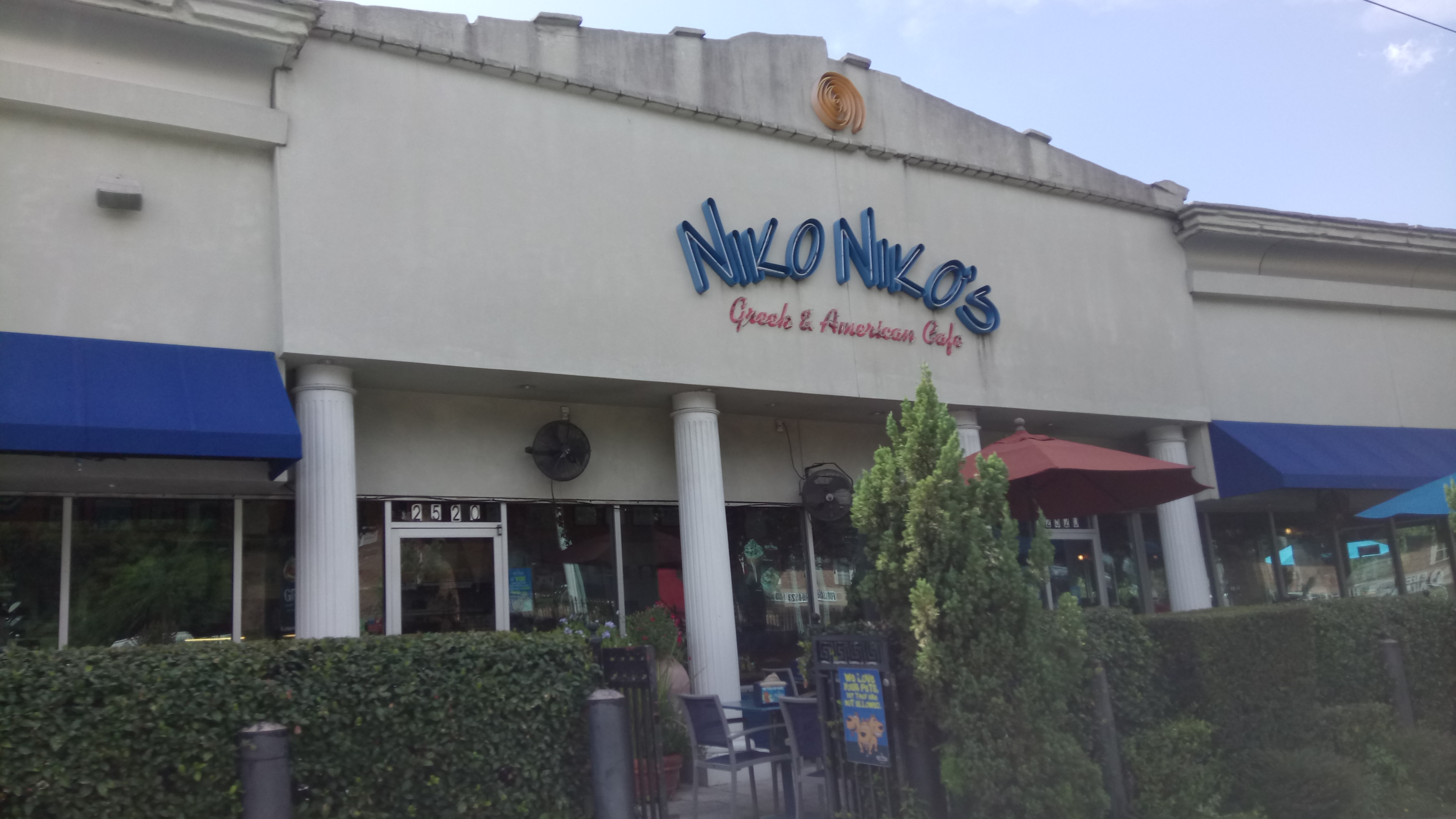
- The restaurant's exterior in 2017
- Interactive map of Niko Niko's

Restaurant information
- Established: 1977
- Owner: Dimitri Fetokakis
- Food type: Greek cuisine
- Location: 2520 Montrose, Houston, Texas, 77006, United States
- Other locations: Spring Branch, Woodlands
- Website: www.nikonikos.com

Niko Niko's Greek & American Café (more commonly known as Niko Niko's) is a restaurant located in Montrose District, Houston, Texas known for serving Greek cuisine. Chrisanthios Fetokakis opened the restaurant in 1977, and ownership was eventually passed on to his son, Dimitri Fetokakis.

== History ==
According to Niko Niko's official site, Chrisanthios Fetokakis opened a walk-up window restaurant on May 1, 1977, earning $15 the first day it operated. After an initial struggle to open, Fetokakis received assistance from Pete Pappas of the Pappas Restaurants franchise. Eventually, Fetokakis' son Dimitri became owner of the restaurant. Dimitri considered Pappas a lifelong mentor, and was saddened by his death in 2005.

In 2005, owner Dimitri Fetokakis began landscaping the median across from the restaurant as part of a commitment to Montrose Boulevard Conservancy's "beautification" project. Before the Houston recycling program known as RecycleBank went into effect in 2009, Niko Niko's used polystyrene plates, bowls, and cups to serve food and drinks. Since the program's implementation, Fetokakis made the decision to switch to environmentally friendlier (though also more expensive) "enviroware" plates and degradable plastic bags. Houston residents participating in the incentive program can earn points for recycling and redeem them at the restaurant.

After more than 30 years of doing business from its location in Neartown, Niko Niko's expanded in 2010 by adding a kiosk in Market Square Park in Downtown Houston. The 375-square-foot (34.8 m^{2}) "sidewalk cafe-style operation" focuses on "to-go" foods such as gyro sandwiches, shish kababs and hummus.

Niko Niko's has sponsored World Gyro Eating Championships at the annual Festival of Greece. In 2009, the restaurant hosted a viewing party after being featured on the Food Network's television program Diners, Drive-Ins and Dives. The restaurant appeared on the show again 11 years later in 2020.

In May 2014 the restaurant announced it was opening a new restaurant in an H-E-B at Farm to Market Road 518 at Texas State Highway 288 in Pearland, Texas.

== Reception ==
Houston Press has awarded Niko Niko's with the following recognitions: Best Pork Chops (2001), Best Chicken Soup for the Soul (2003), Best Pork Chop (2005), and Best Family-Owned Restaurant (2008). In a 2010 review, Amber Ambrose of the Houston Press criticized the restaurant's Athenian Mushroom Burger, but conceded that "no rain nor sleet nor snow and now no dry burger could ever keep Niko Niko's off the Houston favorites list".

== See also ==
- Cuisine of Houston
- Houston Greek Festival
- List of Greek restaurants
