= Dio Deka =

- Interactive map of Dio Deka

Restaurant information
- Food type: Greek; Hellenic; Mediterranean
- Location: 210 East Main Street, Los Gatos, California, 95030, United States
- Coordinates: 37°13′15.2″N 121°58′37.8″W

Dio Deka is a restaurant in Los Gatos, California. The restaurant serves Greek/Hellenic/Mediterranean cuisine and has received a Michelin star.

== See also ==
- List of Greek restaurants
- List of Michelin-starred restaurants in California
