= Georgia's Greek Restaurant & Deli =

Restaurant in Seattle, Washington, U.S.

- Interactive map of Georgia's Greek Restaurant & Deli

Restaurant information
- Food type: Greek
- Location: 8007 Lake City Way NE, Seattle, King, Washington, 98115, United States
- Coordinates: 47.6873°N 122.3129°W

Georgia's Greek Restaurant & Deli is a Greek restaurant in Seattle, in the U.S. state of Washington. Guy Fieri visited to film for the Food Network series Diners, Drive-Ins and Dives.

== History ==
The restaurant was damaged by a fire in 2021.

== See also ==
- List of Diners, Drive-Ins and Dives episodes
- List of Greek restaurants
