= Jimmy the Greek (restaurant) =

Canadian restaurant franchise

- Type: Private
- Industry: Restaurants
- Founded: Toronto, Ontario, Canada (1985)
- Headquarters: Toronto, Ontario, Canada
- Key people: Jim Antonopoulos
- Products: Greek cuisine
- Website: www.jimmythegreekgroup.ca

Jimmy the Greek is a quick service restaurant franchise serving Greek and Mediterranean cuisine. In 1963, Jim Antonopoulos from Nafplio, Greece, arrived in Toronto, Ontario, Canada. He started the Epikourion, Exquisite Greek Restaurant & Bar in First Canadian Place of the busy Bay Street district of Toronto. The success of the restaurant spun off the current franchise which now has over 50 locations across Canada in Alberta, Manitoba & Ontario, including more than 50 in the Greater Toronto Area. There are also locations in Dubai, UAE. Its outlets are almost exclusively located in the food courts of office towers and AAA malls. Their menu offers a variety of Greek plates, including chicken and pork souvlaki, schnitzel, lamb dishes, calamari, moussaka and more. They also offer pitas stuffed with different items, traditional Greek style. Additionally, they provide catering services for large parties.

== See also ==
- List of Greek restaurants
