= List of Greek restaurants =

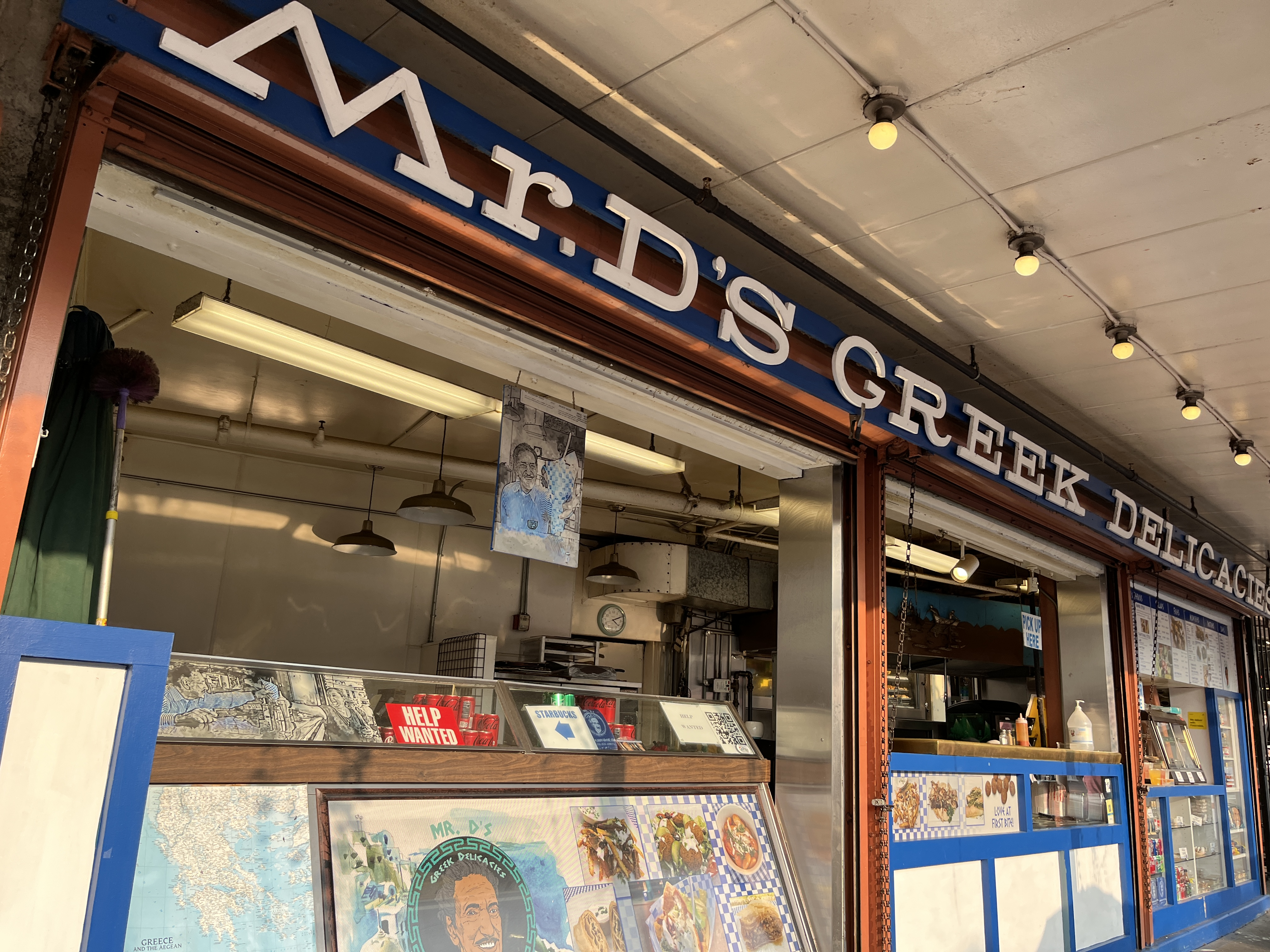
Mr. D's Greek Delicacies, Seattle

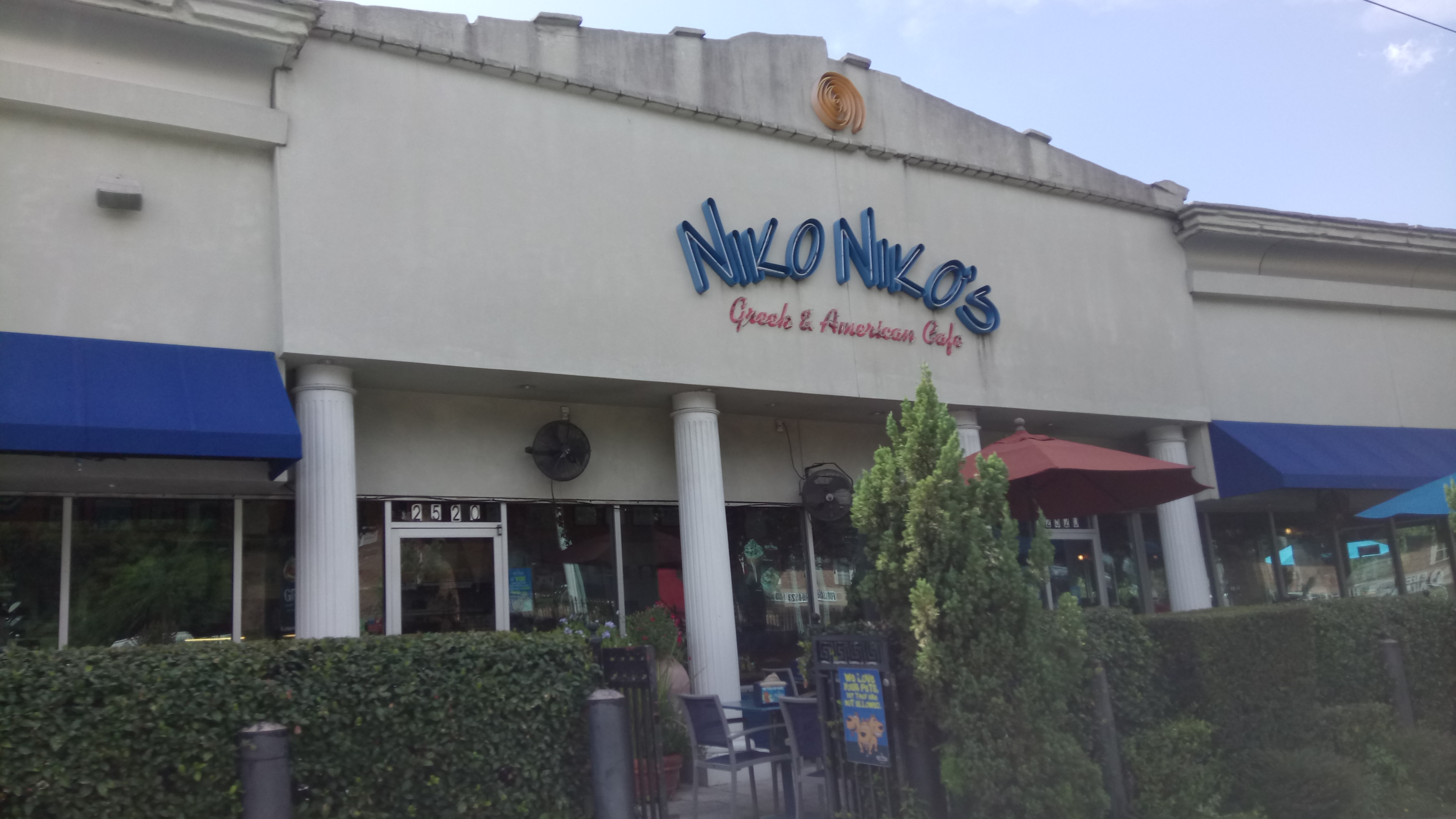
Niko Niko's, Houston, Texas

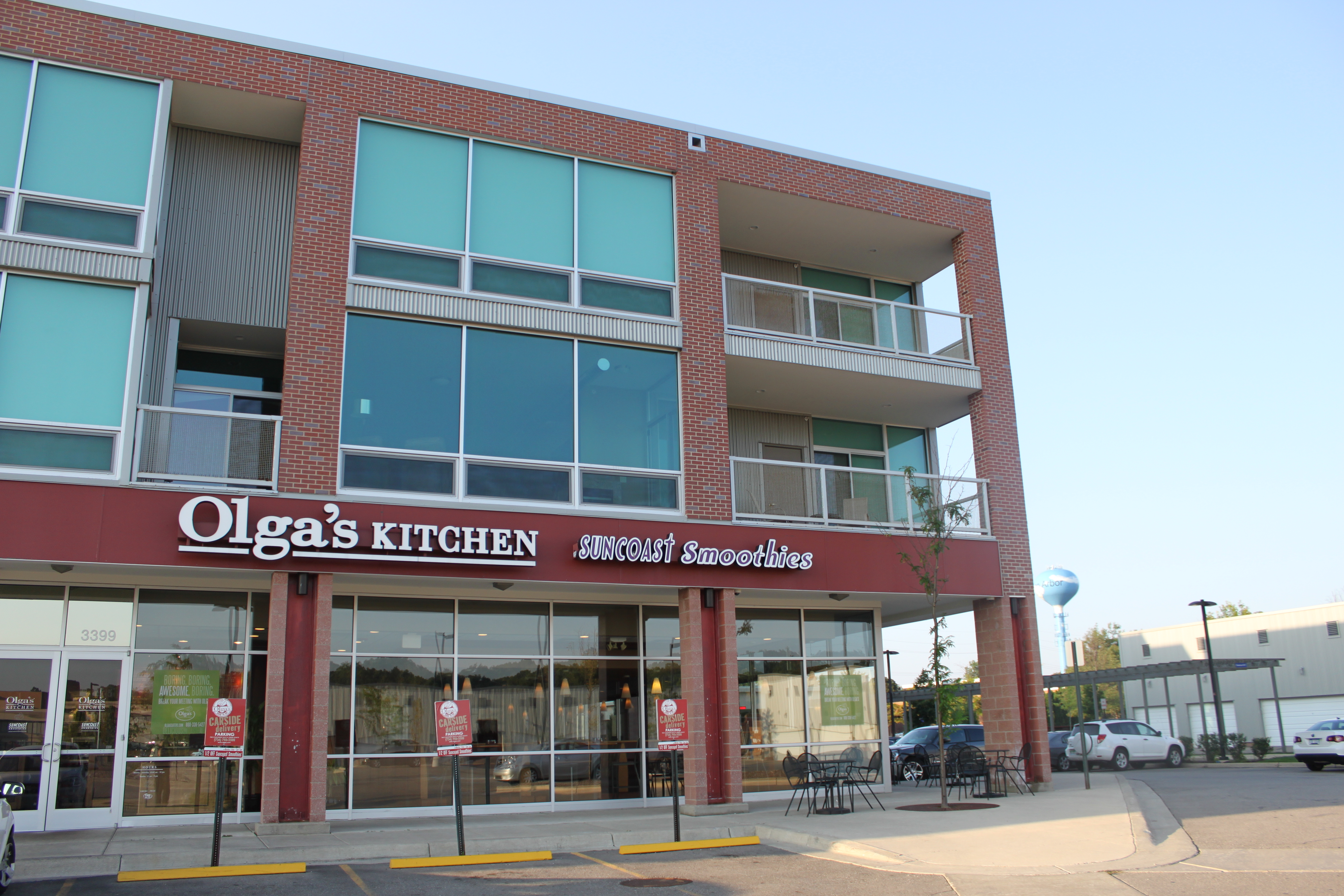
Olga's Kitchen, Ann Arbor, Michigan

Following is a list of notable Greek restaurants, which typically specialize in Greek cuisine:

- Anthos, New York City
- Berbati's Pan – Portland, Oregon
- Bluto's – Portland, Oregon
- Burger Continental – Pasadena, California
- Daphne's Greek Cafe – United States
- Dio Deka, Los Gatos, California
- Georgia's Greek Restaurant & Deli, Seattle
- Greek Cusina – Portland, Oregon
- Greek Islands – Illinois, U.S.
- Jimmy Grants - Melbourne, Australia
- Jimmy the Greek – Canada
- Komi – Washington, D.C.
- Little Greek – United States
- Mad Greek Cafe, Baker, California
- Mad Greek Deli, Portland, Oregon
- Mr. D's Greek Delicacies, Seattle, Washington
- Niko Niko's – Houston, Texas, U.S.
- Olga's Kitchen – United States
- Omega Ouzeri – Seattle
- Papa Cristo's – Los Angeles, California
- Philotimo, Washington, D.C.
- Pithari Taverna – Highland Park, New Jersey
- Showmars – based in Charlotte, North Carolina
- Stalactites - Melbourne, Australia
- Yia Yia Mary's – Houston
- Zenon Taverna – New York City

== See also ==
- Lists of restaurants
