= Berbati's Pan =

Defunct restaurant and nightclub in Portland, Oregon, U.S.

Coordinates: 45°31′21.5″N 122°40′22.9″W

- Interactive map of Berbati's Pan
- Address: Portland, Oregon; U.S.
- Type: Greek restaurant; bar; music nightclub

Berbati's Pan (originally Berbati's Restaurant or simply Berbati's) was a Greek restaurant, bar and music nightclub in Portland, Oregon, United States. It was located at 231 Southwest Ankeny Street and operated from 1985 to 2010.

== Description and history ==
Originally, the business operated as a restaurant called Berbati's, but when the adjacent 24 Hour Church of Elvis moved to a new space in 1994, the owner Ted Papaioannou expanded the restaurant into the former location of the Church of Elvis to include a music venue and renamed the business Berbati's Pan. The bar operated with a jukebox and pool tables, and the restaurant hosted cabaret shows with belly dancing. The venue had a large L-shaped dance floor and three hard liquor bars. It has been described as a "quaint little Greek spot".

According to one reviewer of the Willamette Week, the venue had a consistent "sound" compared to other Portland venues, and credited sound technician Dave Hite. From the 1990s to 2000s, the venue hosted dance and hip hop DJ nights, and during the height of its popularity booked live bands almost nightly. The seating capacity was approximately 500 people in 2009.

The nightclub closed down shortly after the death of the owner Ted Papaioannou on November 8, 2010, but the restaurant continued to operate. In 2015 the business was sold to the owner of Dante's and Star Theater in Portland; Voodoo Doughnut had previously expanded into the former atrium of the nightclub in 2011.

The first group to perform at the club was Five Fingers of Funk and they were also the last to play at the club on New Year's Eve 2010. Alanis Morissette performed at the venue in 1995. Tour dates for The Bad Plus, Creeper Lagoon, Ellegarden, Harvey Danger, and RJD2 were also scheduled.

== Reception ==
Moon Oregon (2007) called Berbati's the city's "leading late-night live music club". In America, Welcome to the Poorhouse (2009), Jane White called the business "one of Portland's best and most popular rock clubs". The eighth edition of Best Places: Portland (2010) described Berbati's as "a favored destination for live-music lovers".

== See also ==
- Culture of Portland, Oregon
- List of Greek restaurants
- Music of Oregon
