= Showmars =

American restaurant chain

GPS Air
- Company type: Private
- Industry: Restaurant
- Genre: Restaurant chain
- Founded: 1982
- Founder: George Couchell
- Headquarters: Charlotte, North Carolina, U.S.
- Website: showmars.com

Showmars is a Charlotte, North Carolina–based restaurant chain, serving a mix of American and Greek cuisines. It was founded by George Couchell (pronounced "coo-shell") in 1982. As of February 2024, Showmars operates 31 locations and employs over 1,000 employees.

== Company history ==
=== Founding ===
George Couchell, founder of Showmars, was a first-generation Greek immigrant, a graduate of Duke University and served as an officer in the United States Navy. He started in the restaurant industry working at Johnny's Grill, a Charlotte-area restaurant owned by his parents. Couchell opened a fried chicken restaurant, Mr. C's, in 1968 in Charlotte and opened the first Showmars in 1982 in Monroe. The chain was named after a Mr. C's employee named Showmar.

Most Showmars stores are in the Charlotte metro area but the chain has expanded as far south as Lexington and north to the Research Triangle.

== See also ==
- List of Greek restaurants
