= Taverna =

Traditional Greek eatery

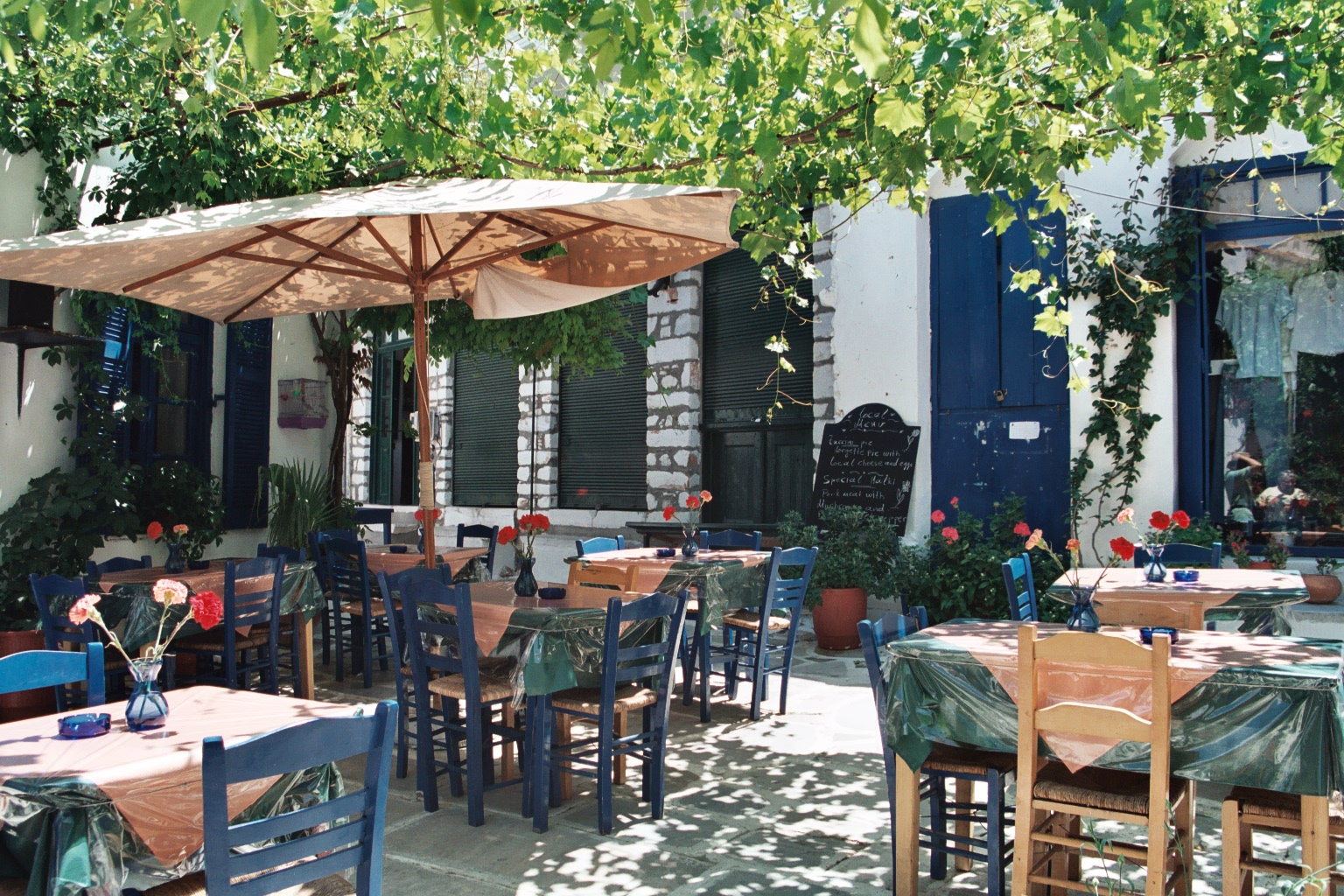
A taverna on the Greek island of Naxos

A taverna (/təˈvɜːrnə/; Greek: ταβέρνα pronounced [taˈverna]) is a small Greek restaurant that serves Greek cuisine. The taverna is an integral part of Greek culture and has become familiar to people from other countries who visit Greece, as well as through the establishment of tavernes (ταβέρνες, plural) in countries such as the United States and Australia by expatriate Greeks.

== Etymology and history ==
Ταβέρνα is a word taken from the Latin: taberna (in plural tabernae), meaning 'shop' (see Roman taberna). The Latin word derived from tabula, meaning 'table'.

The earliest evidence of a Greek restaurant was discovered at the Agora of Athens during excavations conducted by the American School of Classical Studies in the early 1970s. Large quantities of cooking and eating utensils were found at the taverna such as plates, mixing bowls, lidded casseroles, spits for broiling meat, mortars for chopping and grinding, as well as a cooking bell and a variety of jugs. Large amounts of fish bones and shellfish remains were also found, revealing the restaurant's offerings of oysters, mussels, murex, and large fish. A nearby wine shop, possibly in association with the restaurant, served local Attic wine, as well as a wide variety of wines imported from Chios, Mende, Corinth, Samos and Lesbos.

Establishments serving wine were also present in the Byzantine Empire, as evidenced by a 10th-century CE ordinance setting a curfew to prevent alcohol-induced "violence and rioting".

== Cuisine ==
A typical menu for a modern taverna often includes:

- Bread, usually loaf bread, sometimes flat bread
- Meat such as lamb, pork and beef
- Salads such as Greek salad
- Appetizers or entrées like tzatziki (yogurt, garlic and cucumber dip), melitzanosalata (eggplant dip), tirokafteri (whipped feta cheese, with hot peppers and olive oil dip), spanakopita and dolmades or dolmadakia (rice mixture with fresh herbs such as mint and parsley and sometimes pine nuts-and in some regions minced meat is added-tightly wrapped with tender grape leaves and served with a thick and creamy, lemony sauce)
- Soups such as avgolemono (egg-lemon soup) and fasolada (bean soup)
- Pasta such as spaghetti napolitano, pastitsio (baked layers of thick pasta and minced meat mixture topped with a thick béchamel sauce)
- Fish and seafood dishes such as baked fresh fish, fried salt cod served with skordalia (garlic sauce), fried squid and baby octopus
- Baked dishes (magirefta) including a wide variety of seasonal vegetable dishes such as moussaka (eggplant or zucchini, minced meat, and béchamel sauce)
- Grilled dishes such as souvlaki
- Wine including retsina, mavrodafni and other Greek red/white wine varieties
- Beer
- Spirits such as ouzo, tsipouro and Metaxa brandy
- Fruit
- Desserts such as baklava, galaktoboureko, etc.

== Operations ==
Tavernes usually open at noon, with dinner hours starting at 20:00 and reaching a peak around 22:00. As tourism has grown in Greece, many tavernes have attempted to cater to foreign visitors with English menus and touts or "shills" being employed in many tavernes to attract passing tourists. Similarly, tavernes in tourist areas pay commissions to tour guides who send business their way.

== In literature and art ==
The lead character in the play and film Shirley Valentine written by Willy Russell leaves her husband and family in Liverpool for a vacation where she has an affair with a waiter at the taverna and ends up working in the taverna.

== Gallery ==
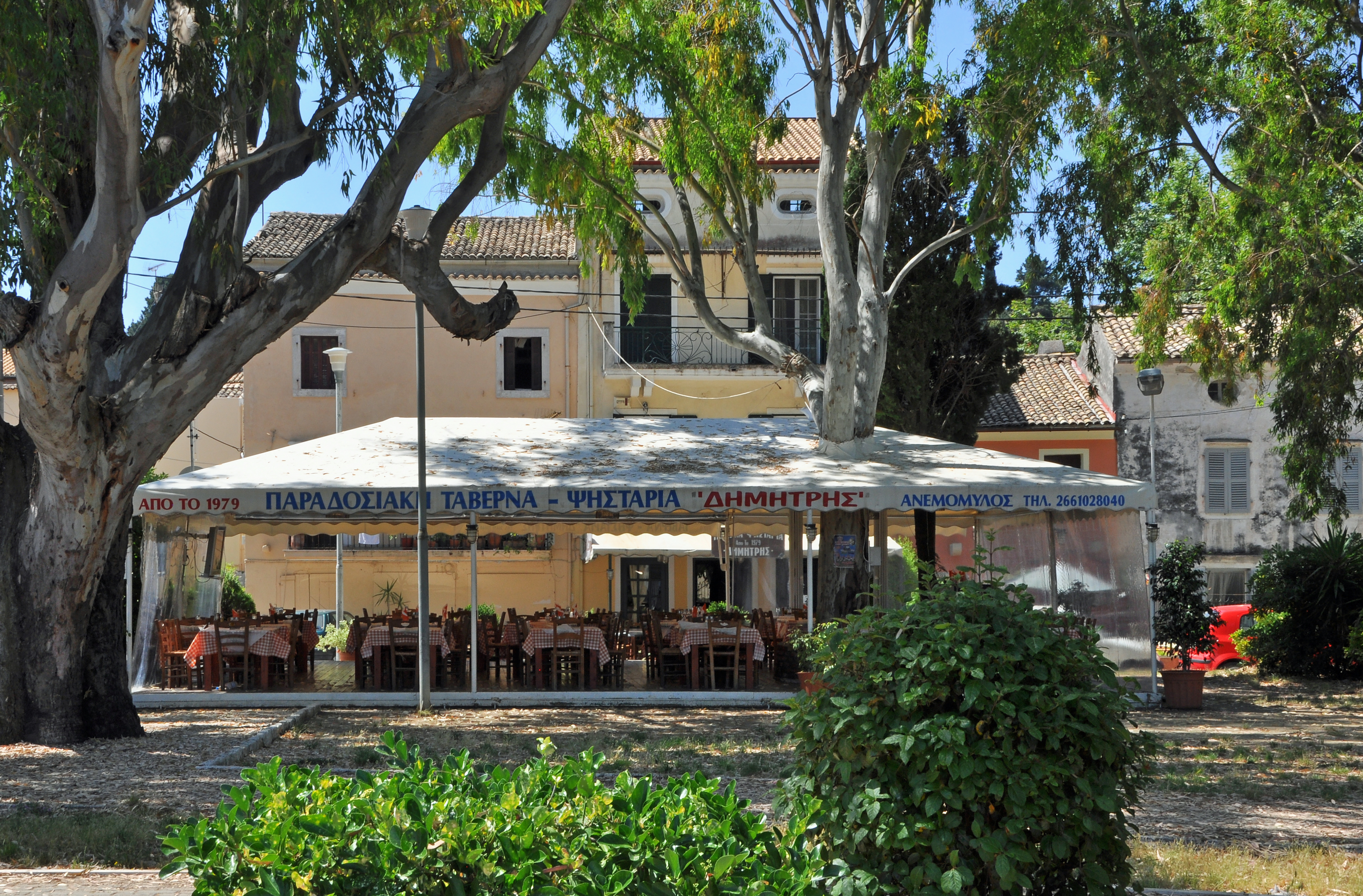
A taverna in the Anemomilos district of Corfu town.

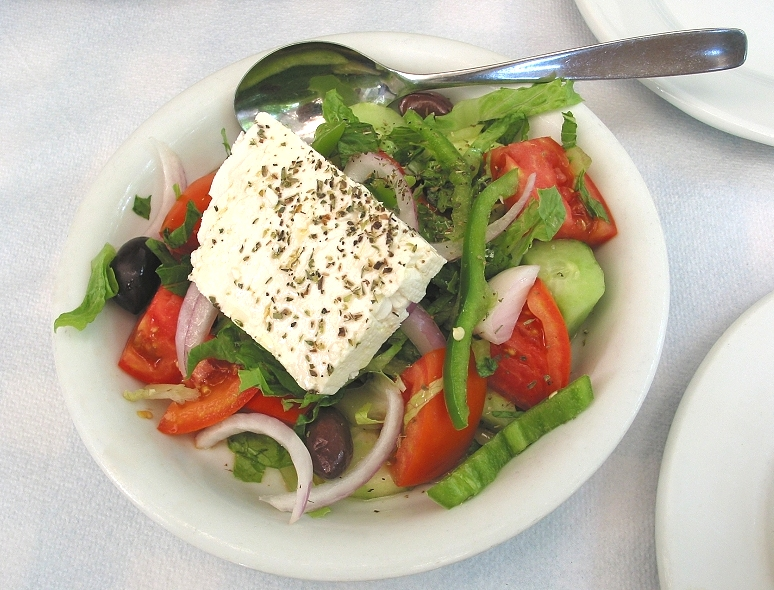
Choriatiki, a Greek salad typically served at a taverna.

== See also ==
- List of Greek restaurants
