= Burger Continental =

Restaurant in Pasadena, California, US

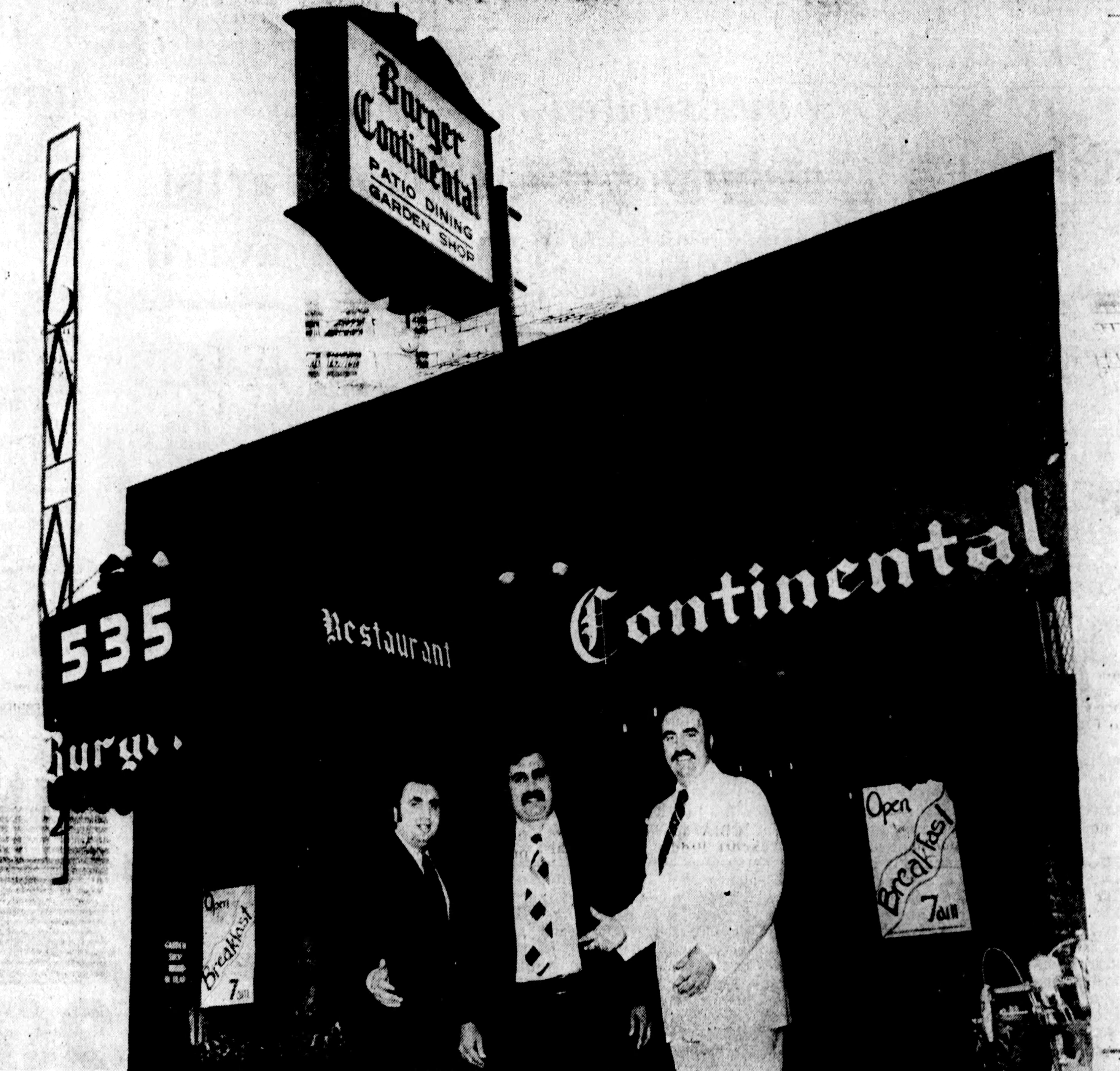
- Burger Continental, pictured with its owners Gary and Harry Hindoyan along with Andre Hindoyan who owned the nearby Le Papillon restaurant, in 1980
- Interactive map of Burger Continental

Restaurant information
- Established: 1964; 62 years ago
- Closed: 2015; 11 years ago
- Previous owners: Gary and Harry Hindoyan
- Food type: Hamburgers; Greek; Middle Eastern
- Location: 535 South Lake Avenue, Pasadena, California, 91101, United States
- Coordinates: 34°08′12″N 118°07′57″W
- Website: Last snapshot of official website at the Wayback Machine (archived 2009-05-20)

Burger Continental was a restaurant in Pasadena, California, United States. It served hamburgers and Mediterranean cuisine. As a caterer for the Los Angeles Criminal Court, it became known for feeding jurors during high-profile trials, including the murder trial of O. J. Simpson. The restaurant closed in 2015 following multiple health code violations.

== Description ==
It was a casual restaurant known for its "eclectic menu", featuring hamburgers, Middle Eastern and Greek cuisine. The Hindoyans served dishes including hummus, kebabs, shish kebab, and shrimp skewers. It was known for serving Chicken Corinthian, a signature dish baked in filo dough with spinach and feta cheese. The restaurant offered brunch and lunch buffets. Both its burgers and its Mediterranean food were popular with customers.

On weekend nights, the restaurant had live music and belly dancers as entertainment. It typically featured a quartet of Greek musicians. A review from the Los Angeles Times called it "a place where you get a belly dancer and three-piece jazz band interpreting Radiohead's "Kid A" — at noon, on a Sunday."

It had a reputation of serving inexpensive food and alcohol. An article from LAist described it as a "no-frills" establishment "where you could sit outdoors, watch a belly dancing performance and drink a cheap pitcher of beer." The Rough Guide to Los Angeles stated that "you can get mounds of chicken and lamb kebabs for no more than a few dollars." Due to the large number of Caltech and NASA JPL scientists and engineers that were known to dine regularly at this establishment during the Cold War era, the LA Weekly labeled this restaurant as the "First Burger Joint To Go When the Russians Drop the Bomb".

== History ==
Burger Continental was established in 1964 by Gene Mays. It was located at 535 South Lake Avenue. It was originally known for serving the Burger Continental burger, with a quarter-pound beef patty, bacon, red onions, and blue cheese. It also served pies and hot sandwiches.

After 1969, it was owned by brothers Gary and Harry Hindoyan. Their older brother Andre Hindoyan was a successful businessman who owned Le Papillon supper club in Monrovia, California. The Hindoyan family was of Armenian descent. They served a menu featuring hamburgers, Greek and Middle Eastern cuisine at Burger Continental.

The restaurant was a caterer for the Los Angeles Criminal Courthouse. Co-owner Harry Hindoyan claimed that this was because the restaurant was a favorite of district attorney Ira Reiner's wife. The restaurant often catered for jurors in important court cases, to ensure that they remained sequestered from the media instead of visiting public restaurants. It provided catering for jurors in the O. J. Simpson trial, Menendez brothers trial, the Robert Blake murder trial, the Reginald Denny trial, and the Phil Spector murder trial.

Many of these trials lasted for long periods of time, so the Hindoyans developed menus with a lot of variety for the jurors. They served signature dishes such as "Chicken Erotica", which was made of bacon-wrapped chicken breasts stuffed with shrimp.

In addition to catering for jurors, the restaurant also catered events for Pasadena City Hall, the health department, and Democratic Party fundraisers. The restaurant was also popular with students attending the California Institute of Technology. Quantum physicists Kip Thorne, Richard Feynman, and John Archibald Wheeler would discuss physics theories while eating lunch there during the early 1970s. In 2012, aerospace engineer Adam Steltzner brought the Entry, Descent & Landing team working on the Curiosity Mars mission to lunch at Burger Continental the day before the landing.

In 2007, the restaurant closed indefinitely due to a fire. In later years, the restaurant's business reportedly slowed and it was unable to invest in necessary maintenance and improvements to its premises.

In 2013, the restaurant was closed temporarily due to multiple health code violations. It was reopened two weeks later after making repairs and purchasing new equipment to bring the restaurant into compliance with health codes. The restaurant was temporarily closed again in 2014 after cockroaches were found on the premises. It closed permanently in 2015 due to health code violations after the city of Pasadena updated its food grading system. The signs were removed from the building it occupied in 2020.

== See also ==
- List of hamburger restaurants
