= Little Greek Fresh Grill =

American chain of Greek-style restaurants

- Industry: Restaurants
- Founded: June 1, 2004; 22 years ago Palm Harbor, Florida, US
- Founders: Sigrid Bratic
- Number of locations: 44
- Area served: Arkansas, Florida, Illinois, Kentucky, Ohio, and Texas
- Products: Greek style food
- Website: littlegreekfreshgrill.com

Little Greek Fresh Grill, formerly Little Greek, is a chain of fast-casual Greek-style restaurants that was founded in Florida by Estonian immigrant Sigrid Bratic in 2004. As of April 2020, there were 44 locations across six states.

== History ==
Bratic visited Florida in search of an opportunity to start her own business, and while working in the restaurant business, discovered a small Greek restaurant named Happy Greek for sale in Palm Harbor. On June 1, 2004, Bratic purchased the then-struggling business. The inaugural location of the original restaurant was in 320 East Lake Road in Palm Harbor, and was later renamed "Little Greek." Following Bratic's changes, the restaurant increased its sales.

Nick Vojnovic invested in the Little Greek concept following his twelve-year corporate presidency of Beef O'Brady's. On April 27, 2011, Bratic and Vojnovic signed a partnership agreement, with a goal of opening franchised Little Greek restaurants throughout the Tampa Bay area and across the US.

In April 2012, the company opened a more upgraded prototype restaurant with an updated look.

As of February 2015, there were 19 locations across Florida, Arkansas and Texas.

In 2015, the company commissioned a study that recommended a name change, and the company became Little Greek Fresh Grill. The company also started looking for sites in Louisville for its first restaurant in Kentucky.' In July 2016, Little Greek Fresh Grill brought on Bryan St.George as Vice President of Operations and later to promote as both Chief Operating Officer and current vested minority owner.

By January 2022 the company operated 44 restaurants in Arkansas, Florida, Illinois, Kentucky, Ohio, and Texas.

== Fare and operations ==
The company provides Americanized versions of Greek-style food, and bills itself as having a “Greek-style menu.” Food is ordered at the counter, and there's an open galley kitchen. Growth continues to move forward as the Greek segment becomes more and more popular.
