= Greek restaurant =

Restaurant that specializes in Greek cuisine

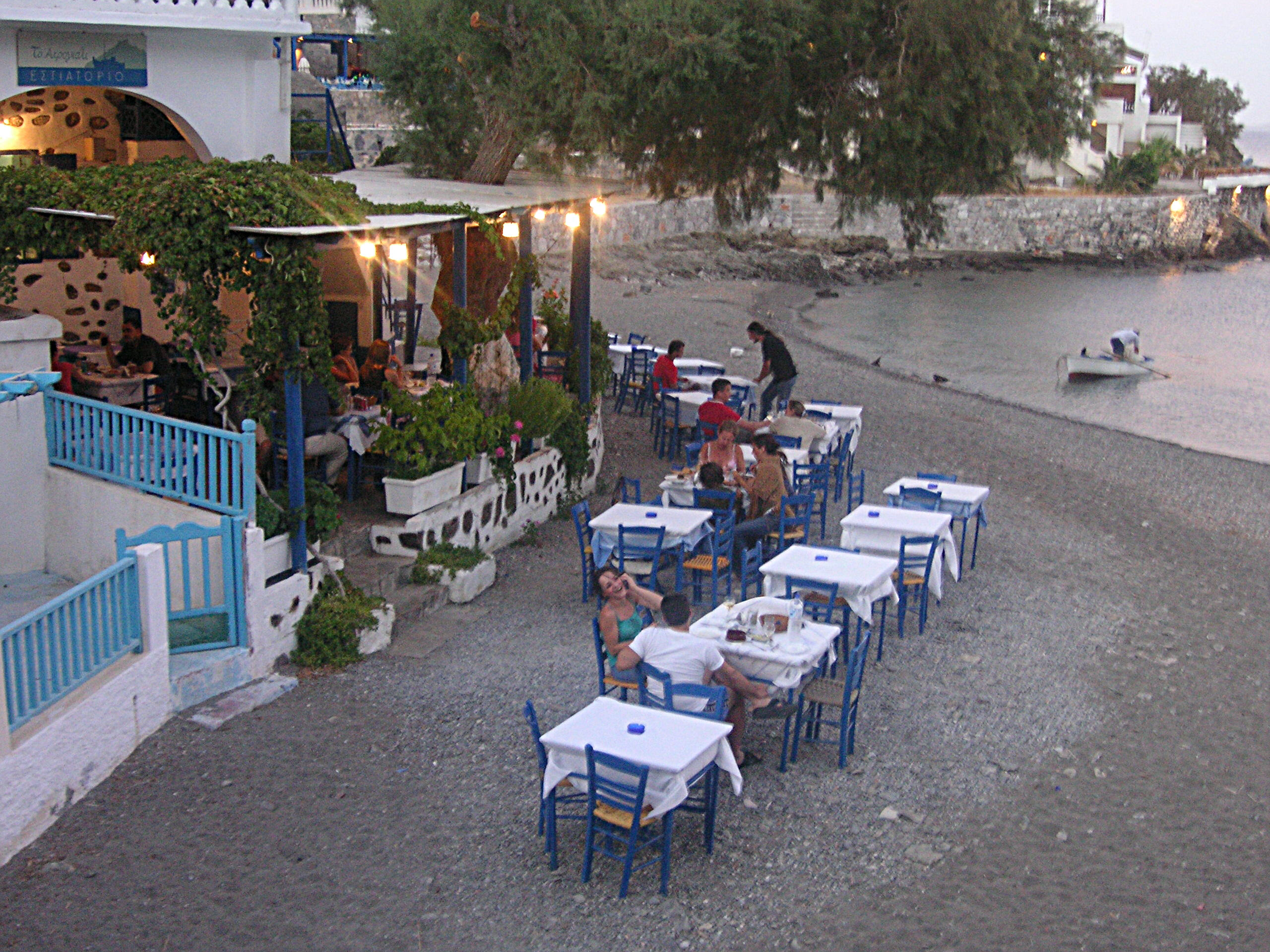
Patrons dining outdoors at a Greek restaurant

A Greek restaurant is a restaurant that specializes in Greek cuisine.

== By type ==
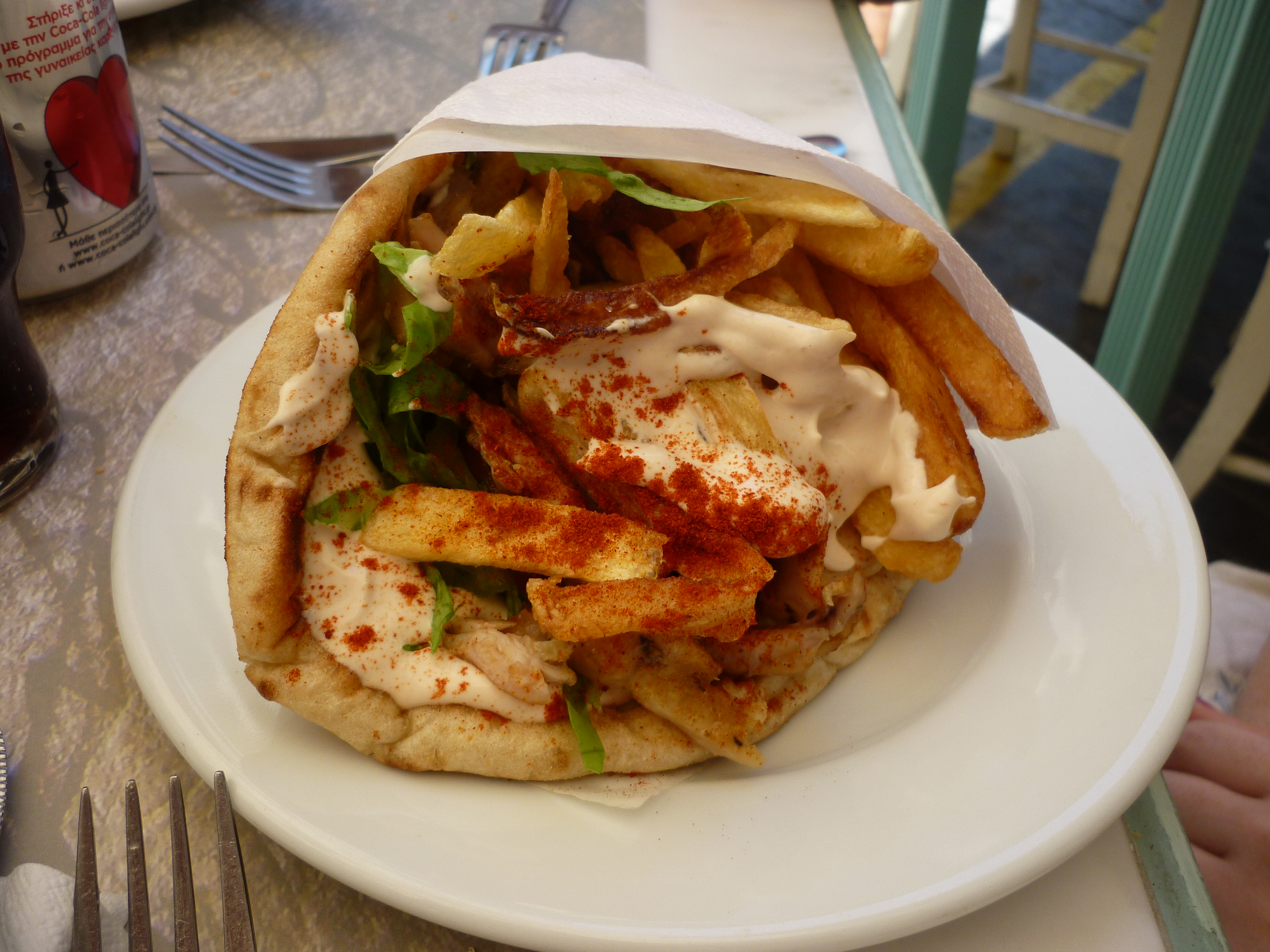
Gyros may be served in a gyrádiko restaurant.

=== Estiatório ===
The estiatório (plural estiatória) is a type of modest restaurant in Greece. It has been described as "something of a vanishing breed." This form of eatery was more active during the early 1900s. An estiatório serves dishes such as casseroles, meat and game stews, baked meat and fish, macaroni pie, and mayirefta in the form of moussaka. Estiatória serve dishes cooked in the oven called magerefta. In addition, they can have grilled-to-order foods called tis oras, fish, appetizers (mezedes), and salads.

=== Psitopolío ===
A psitopolío (plural psitopolía) is a grill house, usually serving, next to grilled meat dishes, a variety of appetizers and salads. The menu may contain gyros and souvlaki, while many psitopolía also offer steak and chicken.

=== Gyrádiko (souvlatzidiko) ===
Gyrádiko (plural girádika) restaurants serve the popular Greek dish gyros. In Greece, gyros are typically prepared using spiced ground pork shoulder meat on a pita with tzatziki sauce, while in the United States, they are commonly prepared with ground lamb sliced from a vertical rotisserie spit.

Souvlatzidiko restaurants serve souvlaki. Souvlaki is prepared using cubed pork or chicken meat that is cooked like a kebab.

=== Koutoukia ===
A koutouki (plural: koutoukia) is a small, traditional taverna, usually underground.

=== Mezedopoleío ===
Meze restaurants are known as mezedopoleío (singular) or mezedopoleía (plural) and serve appetizers known as meze or orektiko (plural mezedes/orektika) to complement beverages. Some meze restaurants do not offer a menu and serve whatever has been prepared that day. Meze restaurants are common in Greece, especially Psiri, Athens, and are regarded as the most expensive Greek Restaurant.

=== Ouzerí ===
Establishments known as ouzerí are a type of café that serve drinks such as ouzo or tsipouro. They are similar to mezedopoleio restaurants and also provide similar food and service. A tsipourádiko is a "local variant of an ouzerí."

=== Taverna ===
Tavernas, originating in Greece, are typically medium-sized restaurants with affordable pricing that serve a variety of Greek dishes, foods, and beverages. Locations with outdoor seating are popular during the summer season.

Greek restaurants by type

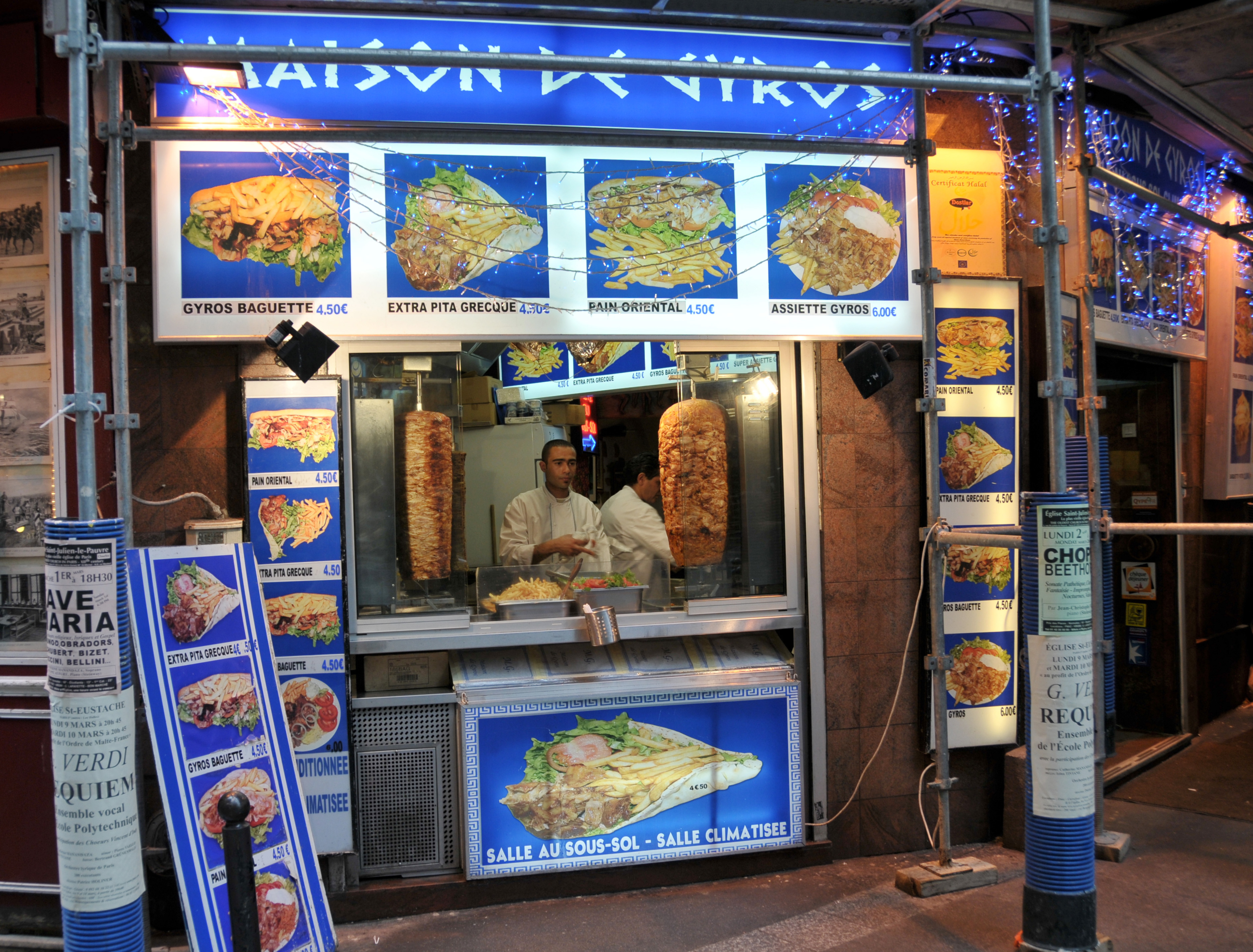
A gyro restaurant (gyrádiko) in Latin Quarter, Paris

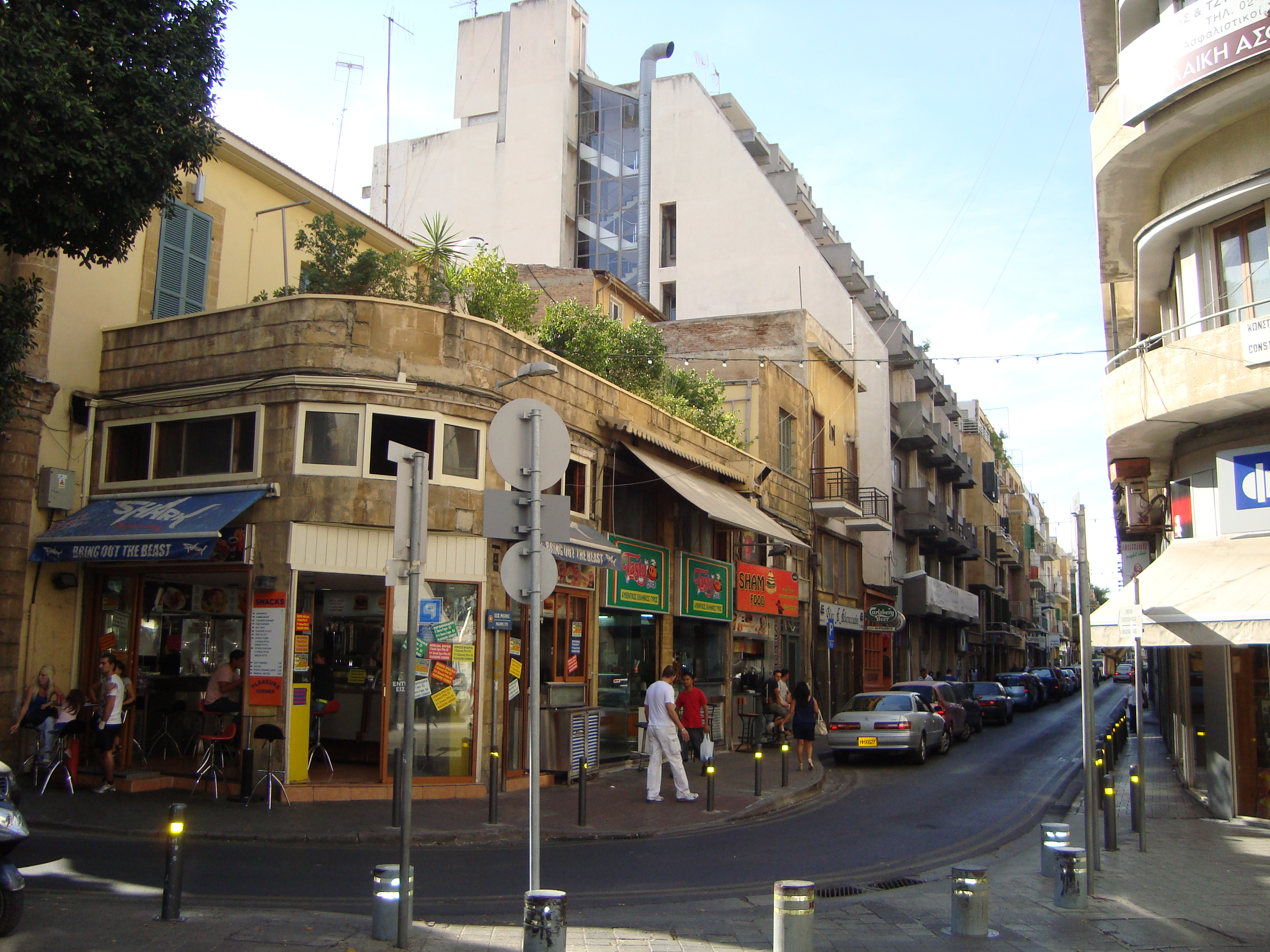
A gyrádiko in Cyprus (left corner)

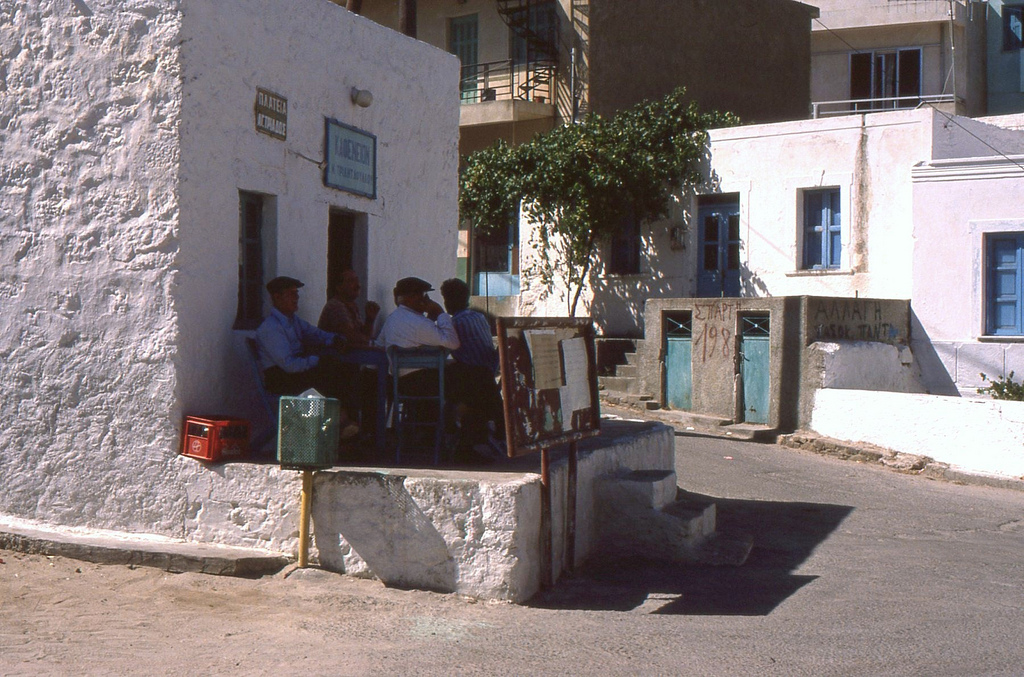
A traditional ouzeri on the Greek island of Kos

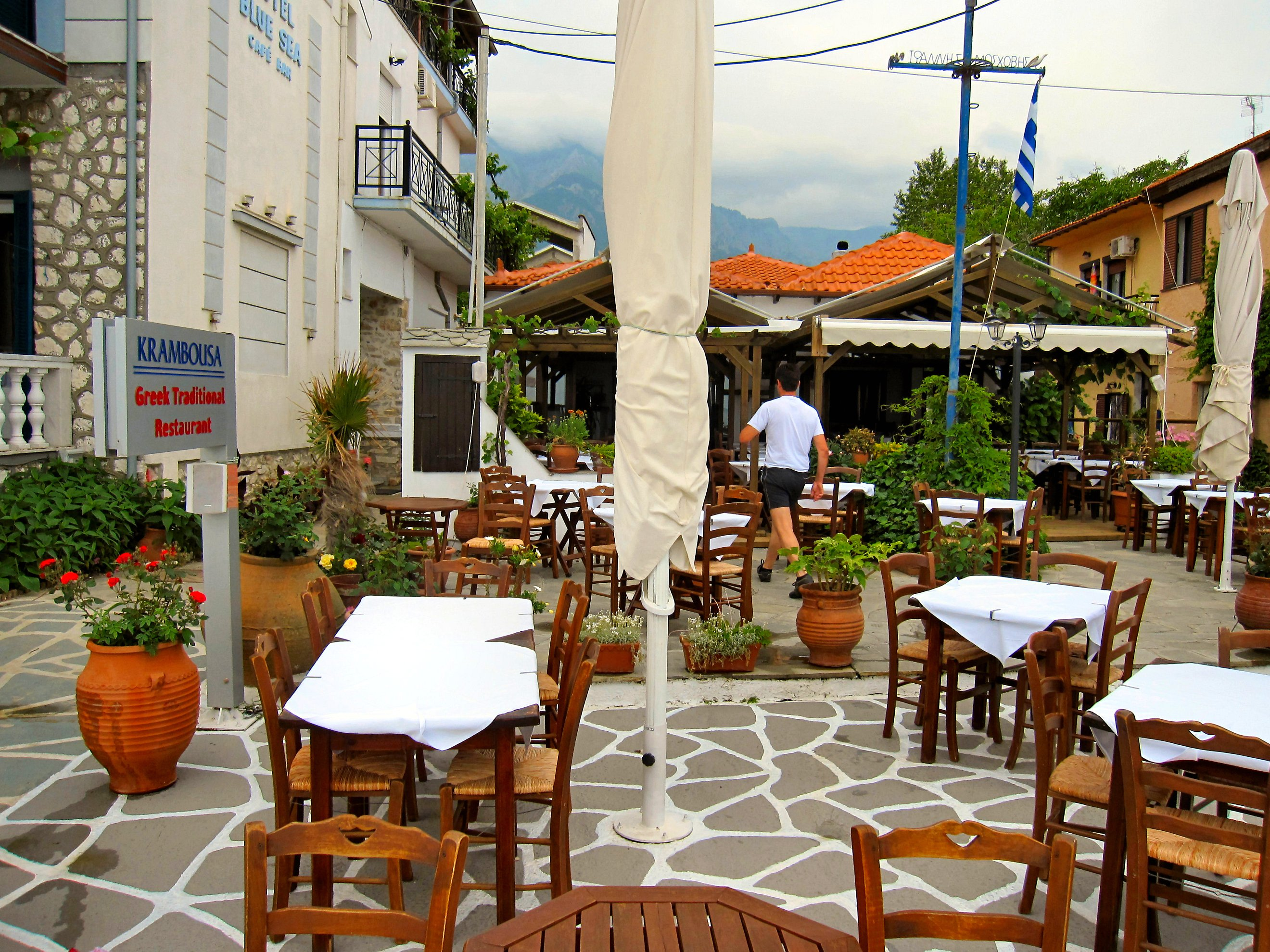
Taverna in Thasos

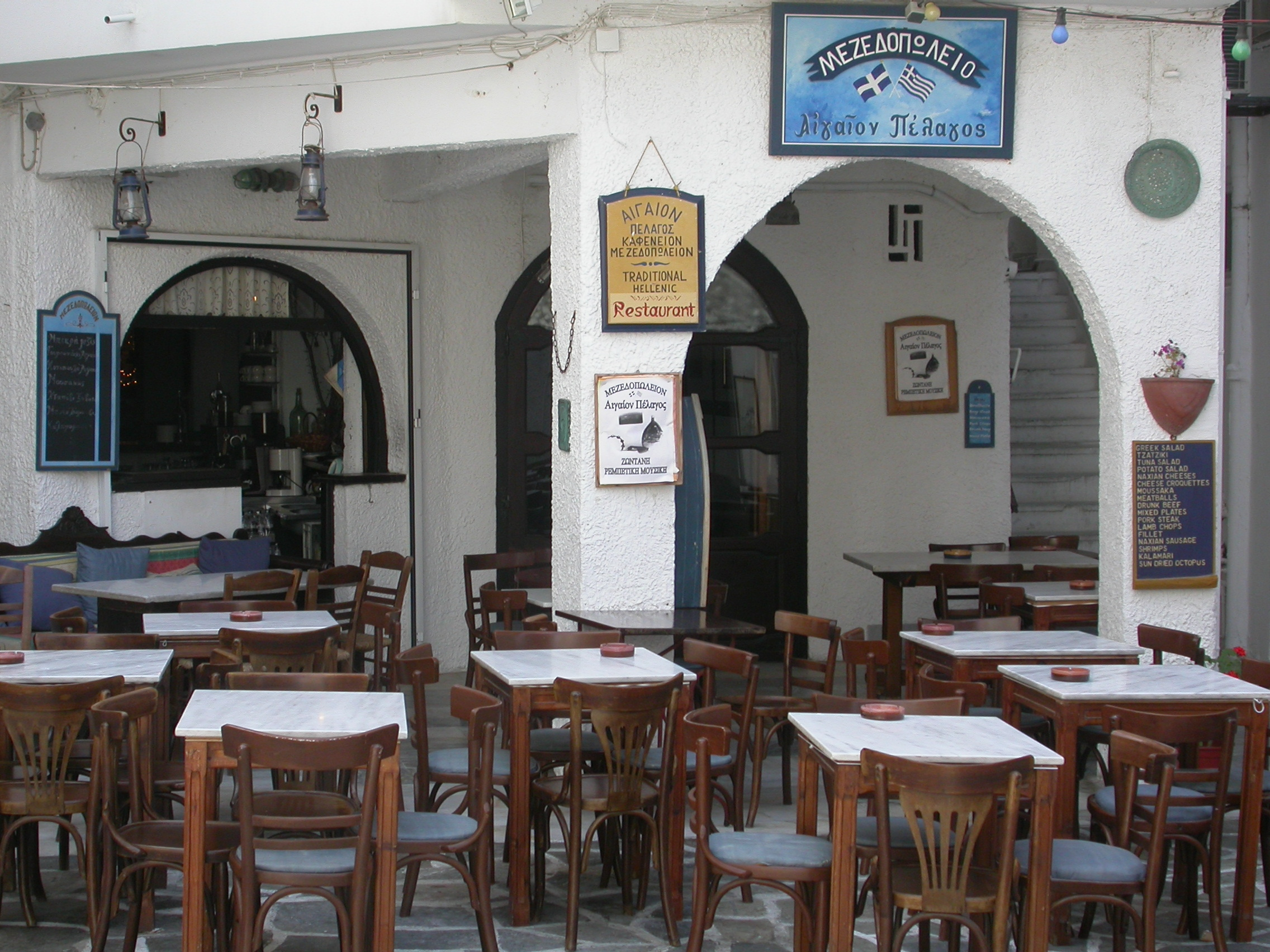
Mezedopoleio in Naxos

== By country ==
=== Greece ===
In many Greek restaurants, it is not considered impolite for guests to enter the kitchen to see what is cooked before ordering; however, this is not typical in fine dining and hotel restaurants. After visiting the kitchen, a waiter will be notified of guests' choices. Table service is usually relaxed and laid-back and patrons may need to flag down or wait for staff to order and request items. Wine is commonly consumed during lunch and dinner.

=== United States ===
In the U.S., Greek restaurants provide authentic Greek cuisine and dining customs. They vary in types of service, cuisine, menu offerings, table settings, and seating arrangements. They may also offer dishes from other cuisines. Immigrants from Greece have opened many Greek restaurants in the U.S., some of which began due to new health codes during the early 20th century that limited or restricted food carts. Per the restrictions during this time, people opened Greek restaurants instead of operating food carts. Additionally, many Greek confectioneries and sweet shop businesses declined during this period due to an increase in manufactured candies and sweets. Many of these companies transformed their businesses into lunchrooms, and later, restaurants.

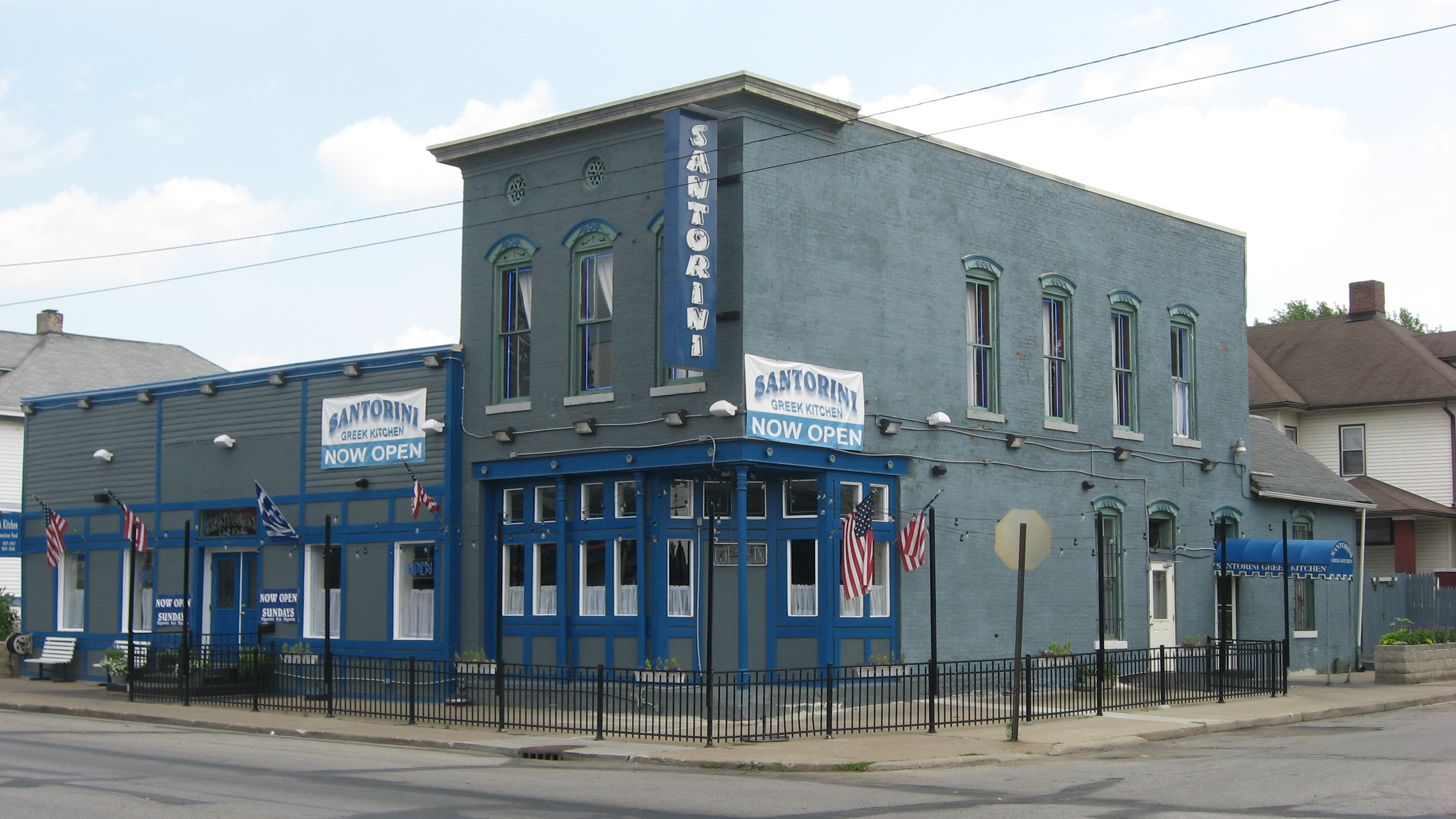
A Greek restaurant in Indianapolis, Indiana, United States

During the early 1900s, some Greek immigrant restaurants expanded their operations into chain restaurants. At the time, Greek restaurant chains included (by location):

- Chicago – The Katsivalis (Teddy) Family owned 15 Restaurants and 6 Hotels with Restaurants in them.
- New York – Foltis, Stavrakas, Litzotakis
- North Carolina, South Carolina, and Virginia: Lambropoulos

In 1913, there were "several hundred Greek-owned lunchrooms and restaurants in Chicago."

It is estimated that approximately 7,000 Greek restaurants existed in the U.S. by the beginning of the Great Depression in 1929. However, many U.S. Greek restaurants went out of business due to the Great Depression. As a result, more patrons could not afford to eat out in restaurants during this time. In addition, competition rose due to an increase in affordably-priced lunch counters opening in various types of stores, such as drug stores and department stores.

During the 1950s and 1960s, the number of Greek restaurants increased, and by the 1970s, they were considered a significant pillar in the U.S. restaurant landscape.

== Cuisine ==
=== Appetizers and light meals ===
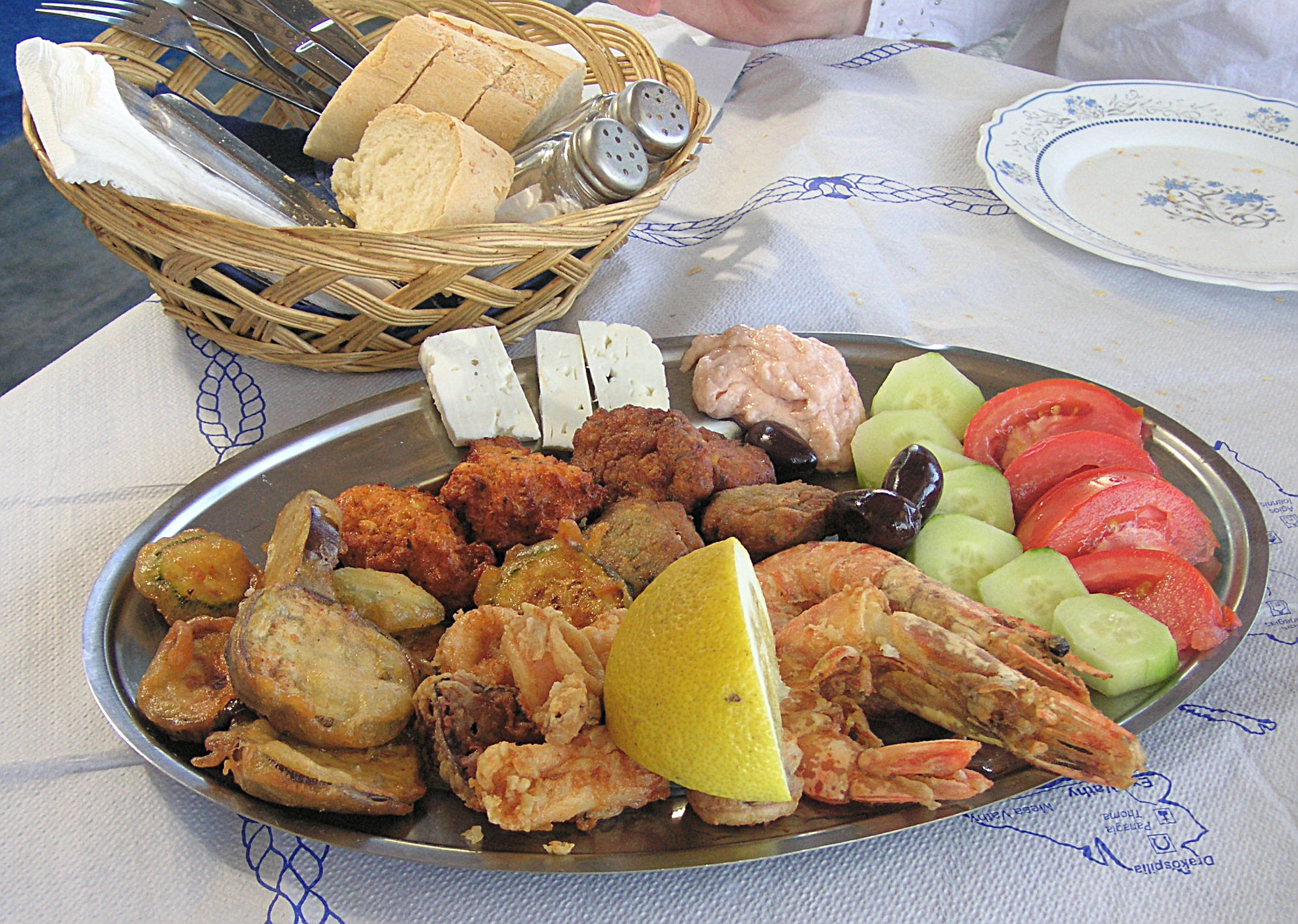
A pikilía variety platter with a variety of mezedes served at a Greek restaurant

A tavérna or estiatório may offer a meze as an orektikó. Many restaurants offer their house pikilía, a platter with a variety of various mezedes that can be served immediately to customers looking for a quick or light meal. Krasomezédhes (literally "wine-meze") are mezedes that go well with wine; ouzomezédhes are mezedes that go with ouzo, a Greek beverage. Psomi oretiko is a bread appetizer that is common in Greek restaurants.

=== Main courses ===
In Greece, the main courses may be ordered directly from the kitchen, a menu board or physical menus. In coastal Greek restaurants, fish dishes may be weighed and sold by the kilogram, which occurs before cooking. Frozen fish is sometimes used, which may be described on menus as katepsigmenos. Seafood dishes that are staples include swordfish, octopus, squid, sardines, and prawns.

=== Beverages ===
Most Greek restaurants will have traditional water, sparkling water, soda, wine and beer. Some restaurants will also have specialty cocktails and wine. "Greece is one of the oldest wine-producing regions in the world and among the first wine-producing territories in Europe." Some restaurants may also serve Ouzo, a dry anise-flavored aperitif that is widely consumed in Greece and Cyprus. It is made from rectified spirits that have undergone a process of distillation and flavoring. It is a tradition to have Ouzo in authentic Greek restaurants as an aperitif, served in a shot glass, and deeply chilled before the meal is started.

Greek restaurant cuisine

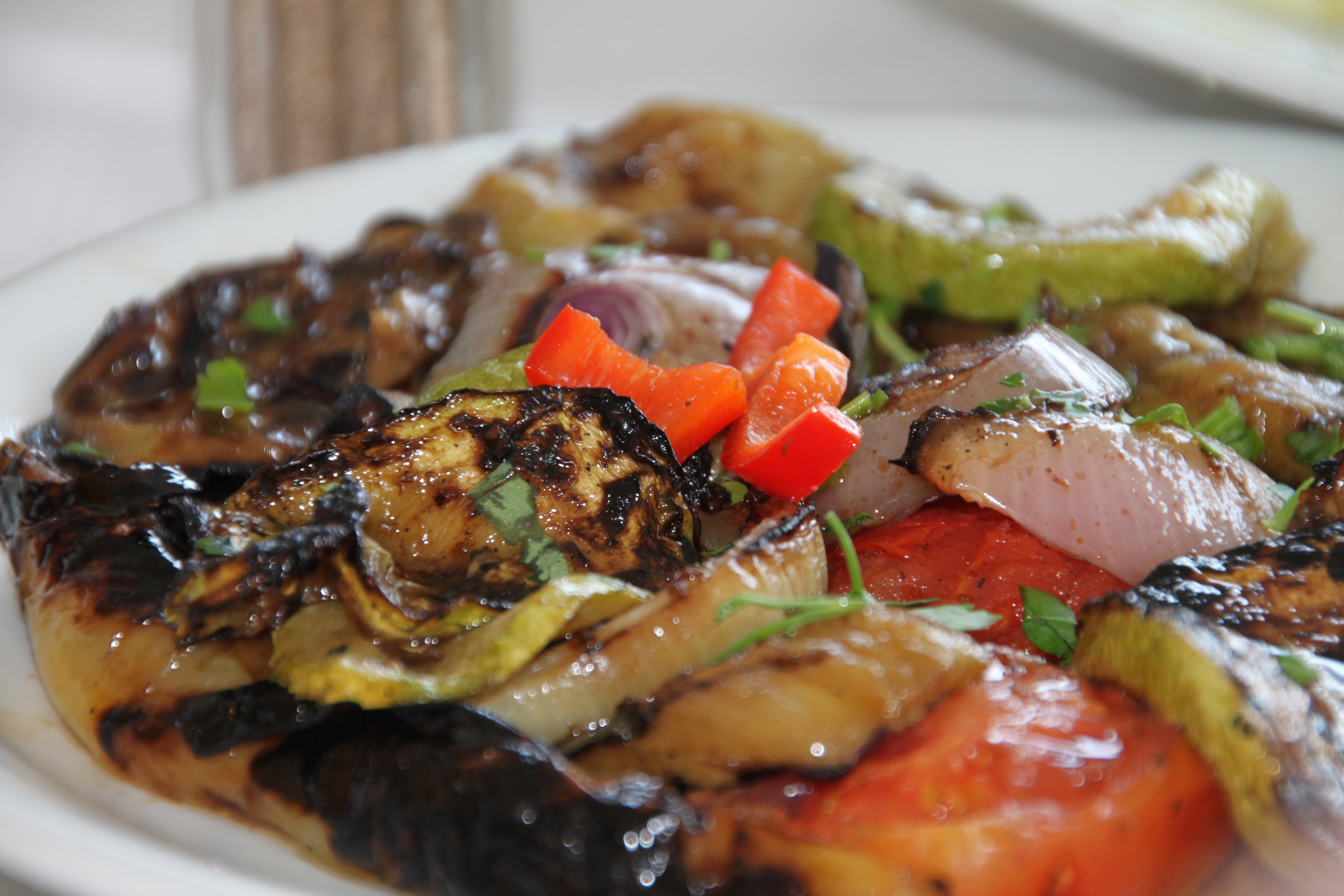
Grilled vegetables at a Greek and Santorinian restaurant

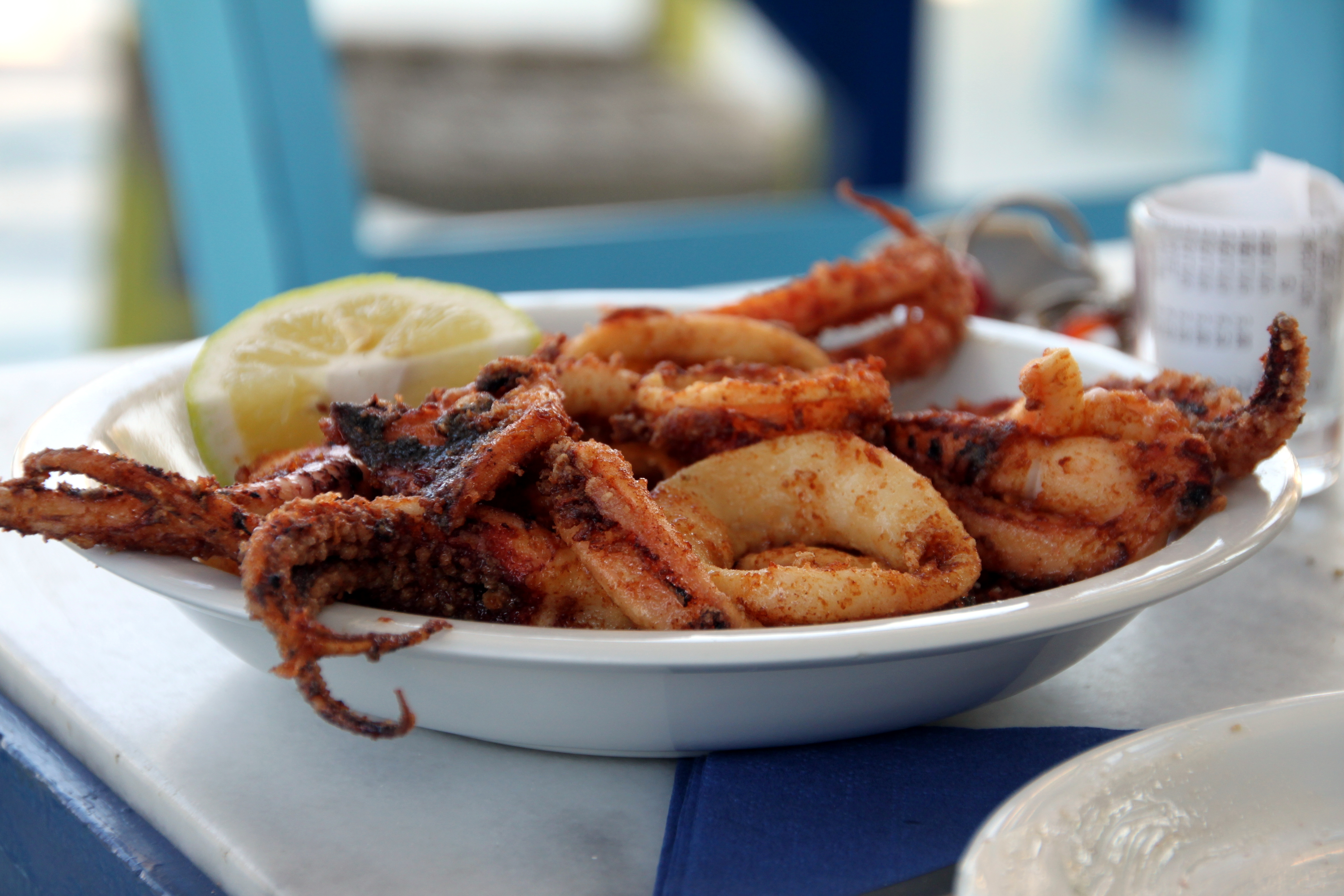
Fried squid at a Greek restaurant

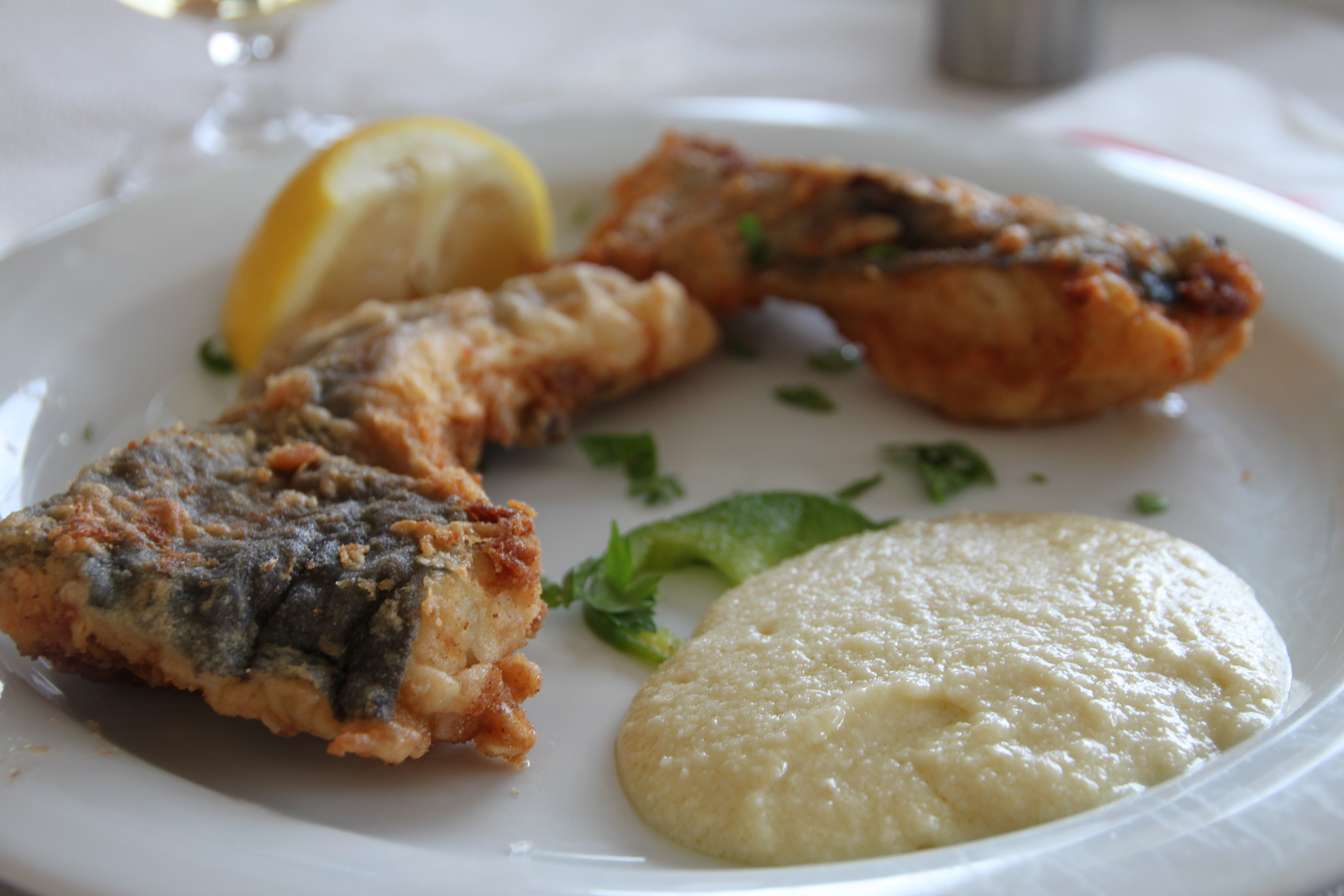
Salted cod with garlic sauce, a traditional Greek dish for the day of the Annunciation, served at a Greek restaurant

== Gallery ==
Depiction of a Greek road sign signifying dining in an area

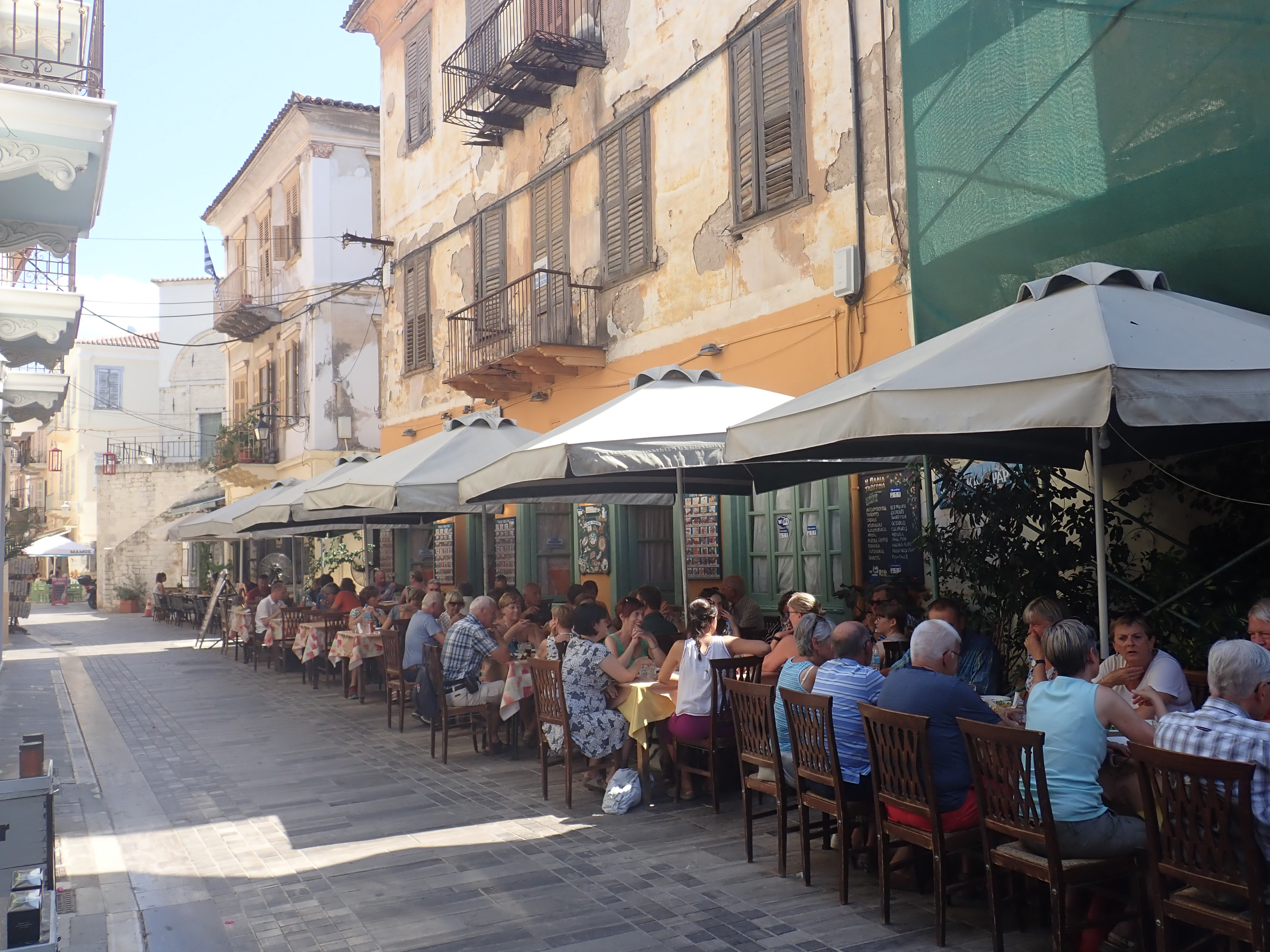
Restaurants in Nafplio

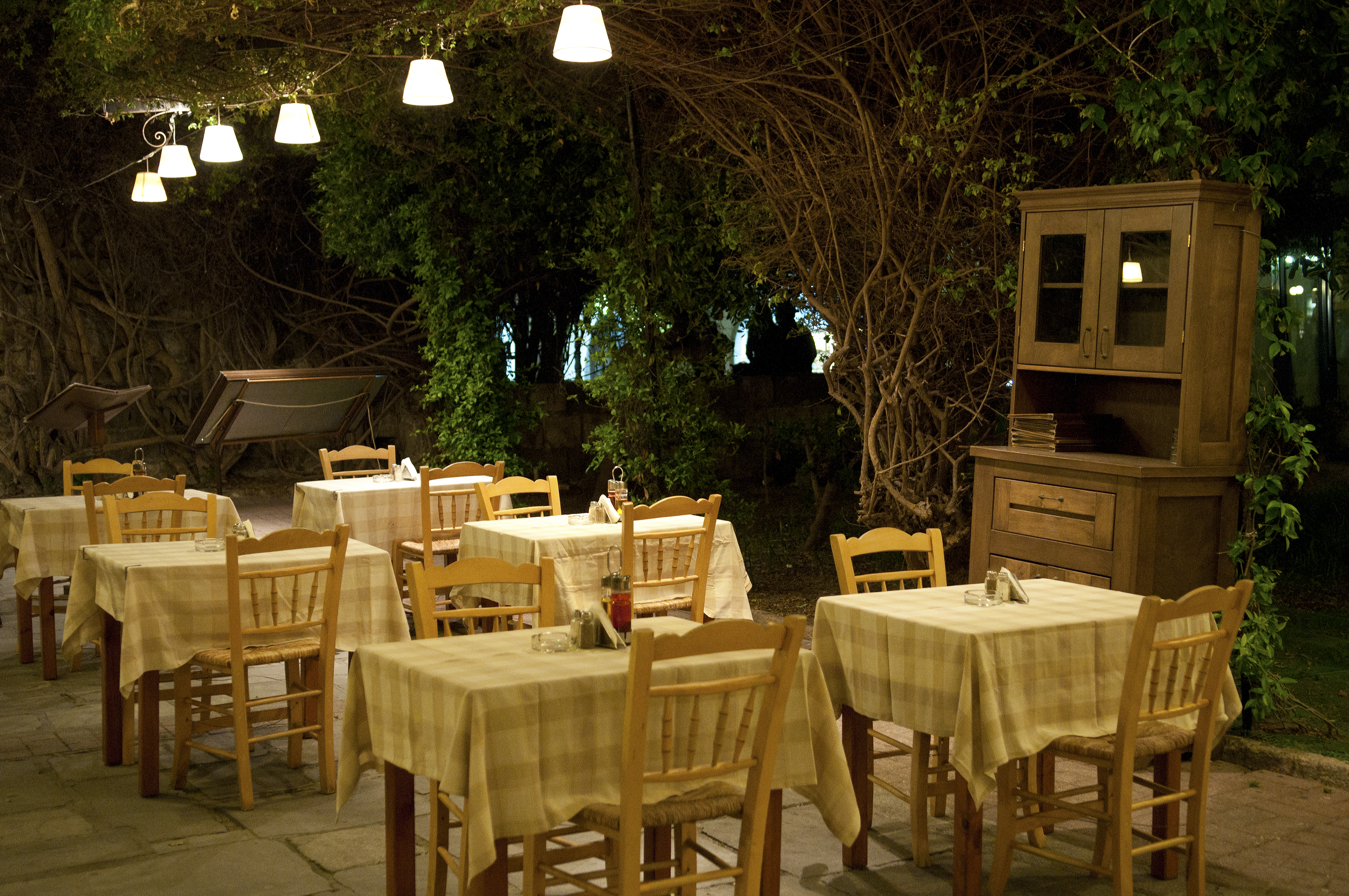
Interior of a taverna in Kos

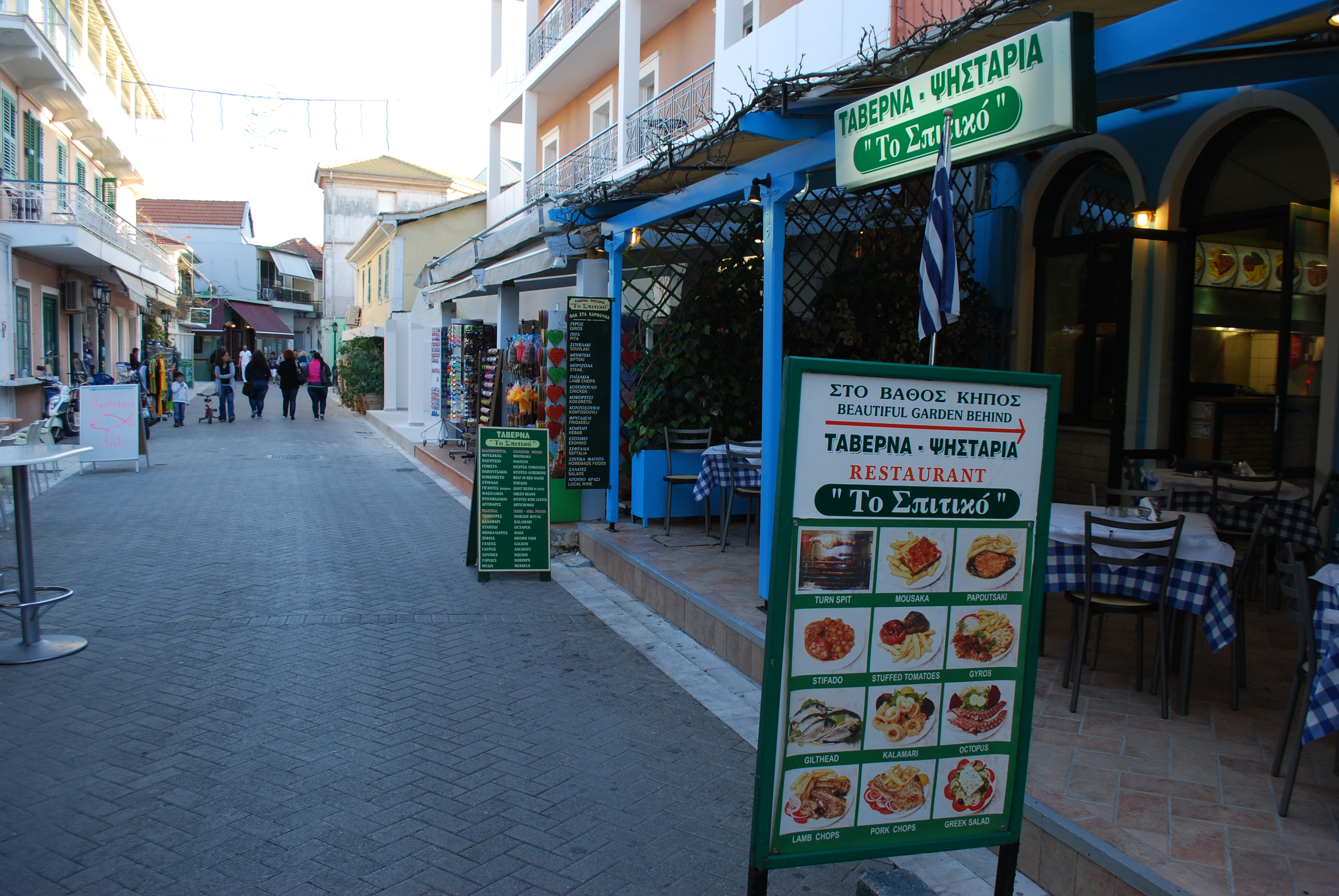
A fast casual Greek restaurant

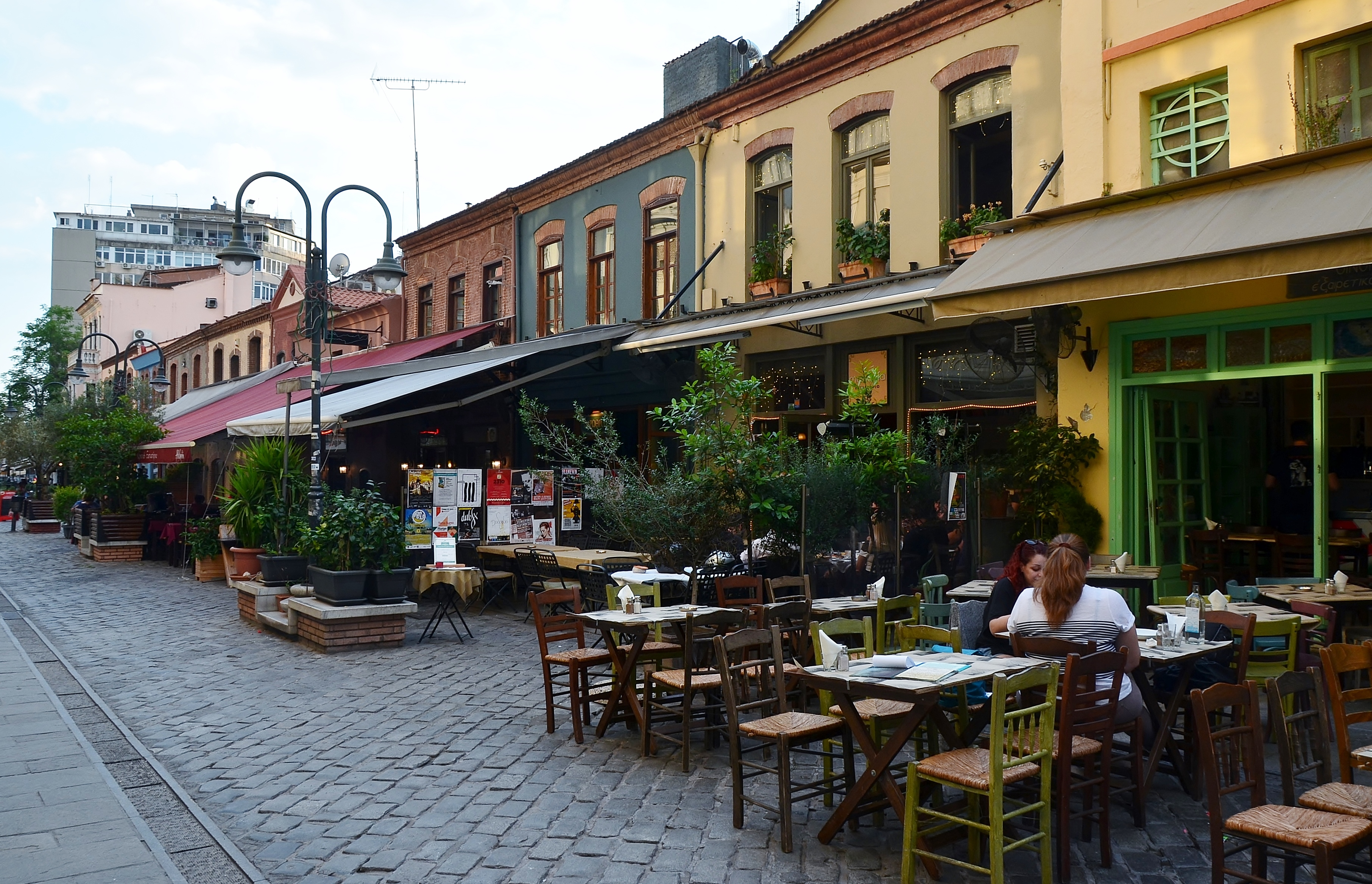
Restaurants in Thessaloniki

== See also ==
- Greek food products
- Greek pizza
- List of Greek restaurants
- Mediterranean cuisine
- Types of restaurant
