= Sach =

Sach may refer to:

- Sach people, an ethnic group of Vietnam
- Sach language, an Austroasiatic language
- Saj, Iran, also known as Sach, a village in Iran
- Sač, a utensil used in Balkan cuisine

== People with the name ==
- Sach, member of the hip-hop duo The Nonce
- Amelia Sach (1873–1903), British murderer
- Andrew Sach, Christian speaker and author
- Andrii Sach (born 1990), Ukrainian cyclist
- Tomáš Šach (born 1947), Czechoslovak canoer
- Warren Sach (born 1946), UN official

== See also ==
- Saach Pass, a mountain pass in North India
- Sachs
- Satch (disambiguation)
- Sache (disambiguation)
