= Satchel (disambiguation) =

A satchel is a type of carrying bag.

Satchel may also refer to:

- Satchel, an Australian pre-paid mail sack

== People ==
- Alex Broome (1921–?), American Negro league baseball pitcher
- Satchel Davis (1918–2013), American Negro league baseball pitcher
- Satchel Paige (1906–1982), American Negro league and Major League Baseball pitcher
- Satchel Ronan Farrow (born 1987), American journalist, son of Mia Farrow and Woody Allen
- Blanche Satchel (fl. 1920s–1930s), Australian dancer
- Satchel (musician), Russell Parrish (born 1970), American guitarist for the band Steel Panther

== Fictional characters ==
- Comrade Satchel, a spy codename from the film Atomic Blonde
- Satchel Pooch, a fictional character in the comic strip Get Fuzzy
- Andrey Satchel, a fictional character created by Thomas Hardy
- Satchel, a character in the American television series The Skatebirds

== Other uses ==
- Satchel (band), American rock band
- Satchel's Pizza, a restaurant in Gainesville, Florida, U.S.

== See also ==
- Satchel charge, a demolition explosive in a bag
- Satchel-mouth (disambiguation)
- Satch (disambiguation)
