= Satchel-mouth (disambiguation) =

A satchel-mouth (Lophius americanus) is a goosefish native to the eastern coast of North America.

Satchel-mouth or Satchelmouth may also refer to:

- Satchel-mouth, an epithet for Margaret, Countess of Tyrol (1318-1369)
- Satchelmouth or Satchmo, a nickname for Louis Armstrong (1901-1971), American jazz musician
- Mr. Satchelmouth Lemon, a fictional character from the 1994 novel Soul Music by Terry Pratchett

== See also ==
- Satchel (disambiguation)
- Mouth (disambiguation)
