= Satchell =

Satchell is a surname. Notable people with the surname include:

- Elizabeth Satchell (1763–1841), English actress
- Kevin Satchell (born 1988), English boxer
- Paige Satchell (born 1998), New Zealand women's footballer
- Sydney Satchell (born 1992), American sitting volleyball player
- William Satchell (1861–1942), New Zealand horticulturalist and writer

== See also ==
- Satchel (disambiguation)
