= Jean Ackerman (actress) =

American actress (1903–1960)

- Ackerman in 1928, photographed by Alfred Cheney Johnston
- Born: Jeanette MacCraw; 11 December 1903; New York City, New York, U.S.
- Died: 26 November 1960 (aged 56); Miami Beach, Florida, U.S.
- Years active: 1927–1931
- Spouse(s): Richard Ackerman (m. 1921; div. 1930) Walter Hirshon (m. 1931; div. 1940)

Jean Ackerman (née MacCraw; 11 December 1903 – 26 November 1960) was an American actress, Ziegfeld girl and showgirl.

== Biography ==
From left to right: Claudia Dell, William Moulton Marston, Jean Ackerman.

Ackerman was born in 1903 in New York City. She first appeared in the comic opera The Mikado at the 44th Street Theatre in April 1925. She joined the Ziegfeld Follies of 1927 and appeared in the musical Whoopee in December 1928, and in Ziegfeld Midnight Frolic and Smiles in November 1930. She also appeared in promotional photographs for Lucky Strike in 1927 alongside other Ziegfeld girls Muriel Finley, Blanche Satchel and Myrna Darby and in another in 1928 with Gladys Glad.

In 1928 she was subject to pseudo-scientific tests by William Moulton Marston on the difference in emotions between blonde and brunette haired women while watching romance films, Claudia Dell was the other subject. She was married to Richard Ackerman through much of her acting career, later also marrying stockbroker Walter Hirshon, which she adopted her daughter Wendy Jean with. She is also known to have had brief affairs with New York mayor Jimmy Walker and comedian Ed Wynn.
