= Takling La =

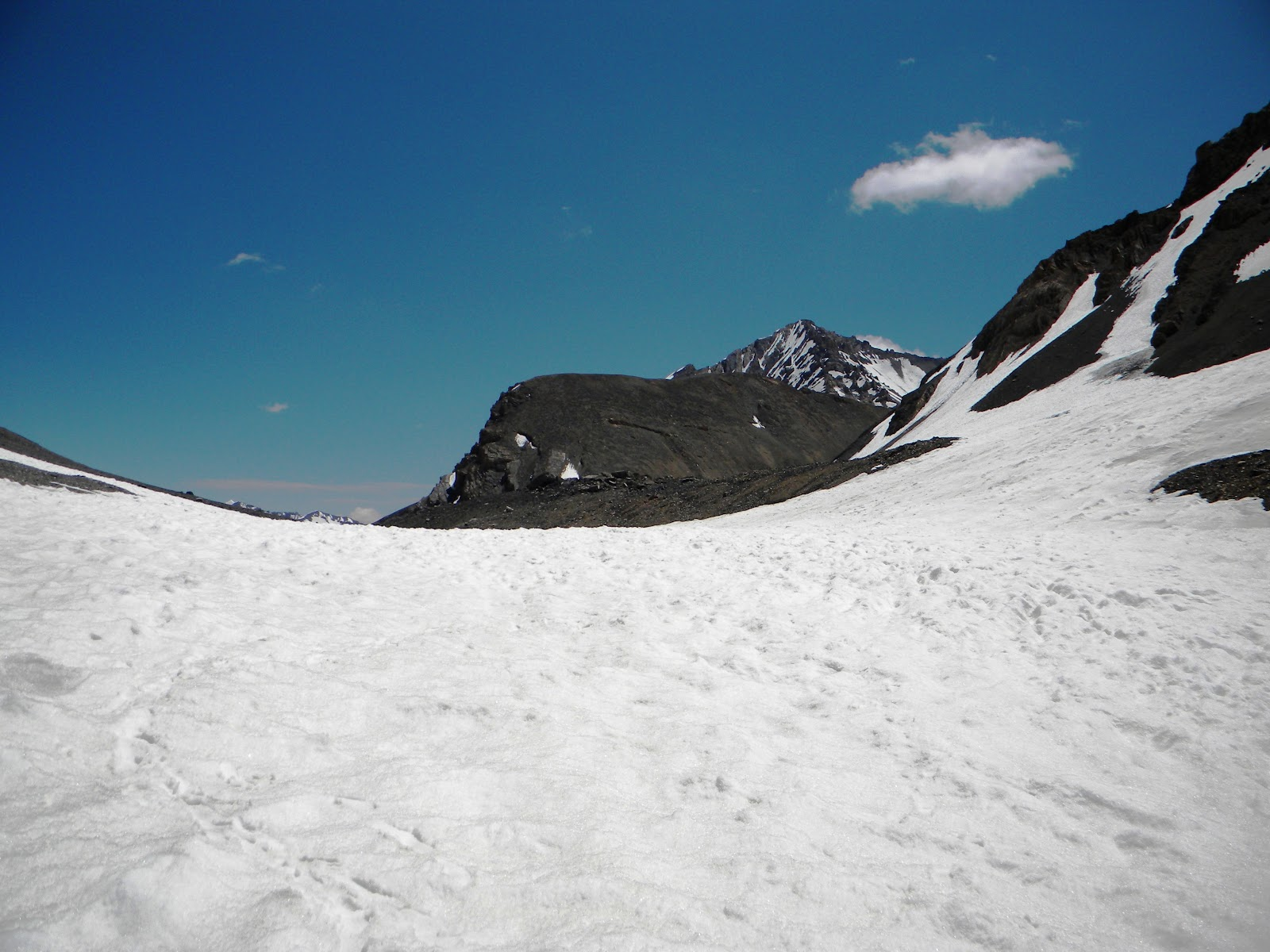
- Above the Takling pass

- Location within Himachal Pradesh
- Elevation: 5,575 metres (18,291 ft)
- Traversed by: Spiti to Ladakh

Third Approach
- Location: India
- Range: Himalayas
- Coordinates: 32°30′12″N 77°59′01″E

Takling La is a parallel trek route through the Parana La (pass), located in the Himalayan Mountains. Parana La is the most famous trek route of Spiti and connects Kaza to Karzok. It has an altitude of 18,290 ft (5575 Meters) and follows the traditional trade route between Ladakh and Spiti Valley.

This pass was initially used as a trade route between Spiti and Ladakh and was popular throughout the 19th century. Over the years, it diminished in use. In 1993, Romesh Bhattacharjee led a group of students from Delhi through this pass. According to Bhattacharjee, many points along the trail serve as the passage across the ridge known as Takling La (Pass).

== Geography ==
Takling La is a mountain pass located in the Spiti region of Himachal Pradesh, India. It is a 5,575 metres (18,291 ft) high pass and is parallel to Parang La. Takling La is located in between Takling Chu and Spiti rivers and can be most easily trekked between June and September. The Takling Chu stream originates northwest of Takling La from the Takling Glacier, flows east, joining Pare Chu near Dutung.

== Tourism ==
The tradition Takling La trek starts at Kibber village or Kyoto and runs towards the Korzoke village of Tso Morrori, The temperature starts to drop between late August and the beginning of September. Late June to mid-August is best for trekking due to the weather. As of 2025–26, the new treks and tourism opportunities will open up once the under-construction Hanley-Kaza-Takling La-Kiato-Kaza-Tabo Road is completed.

== Transport ==
Takling La lies on the 125 km long Kiato-Karzok Road (partially overlaps with the Hanle-Kaza-Tabo Road), connecting Kiato in south in Lahaul Valley with Karzok in north on the shores of Tso Moriri, being constructed by the BRO as the fourth road to Ladakh. BRO has invited the bids in April 2025 for preparation of DPR for this road and Takling La Tunnel which lies on this road. A road is being constructed over the Takling La, and simultaneously a tunnel will also be built under the Takling La for the all-weather connectivity for which DPR is being prepared.

== Gallery ==
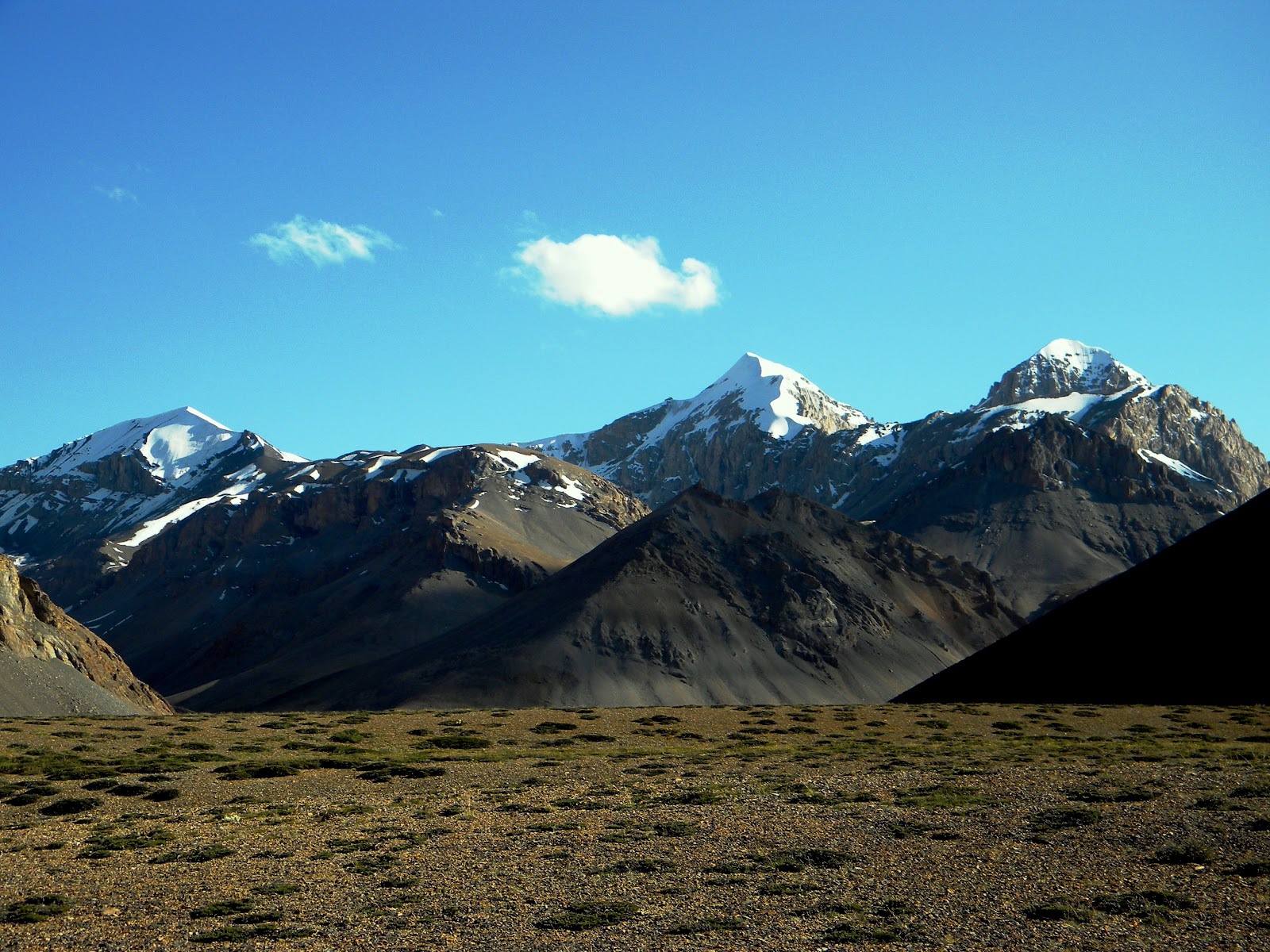
Takling valley other side view

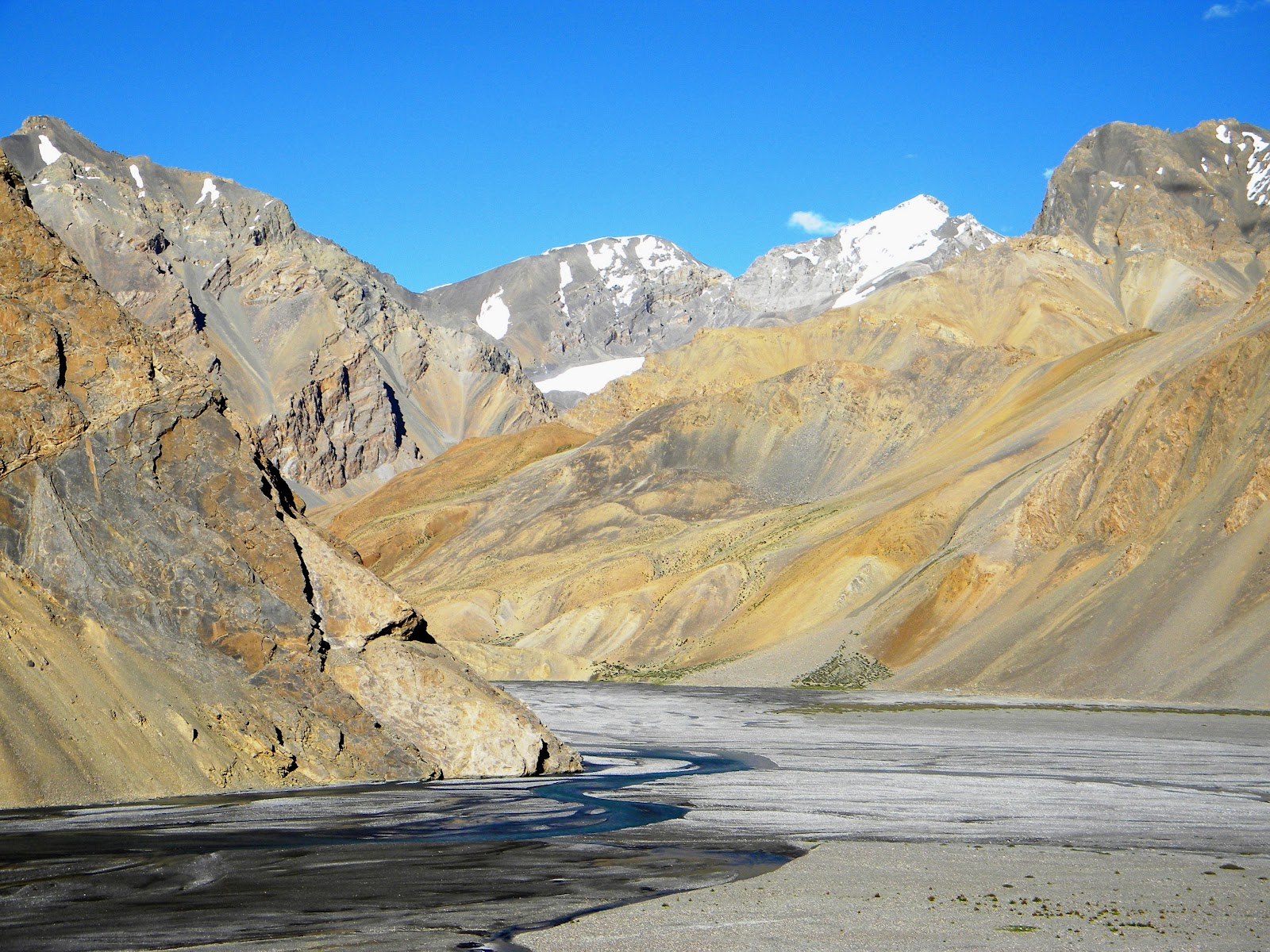
Takling Nala camp

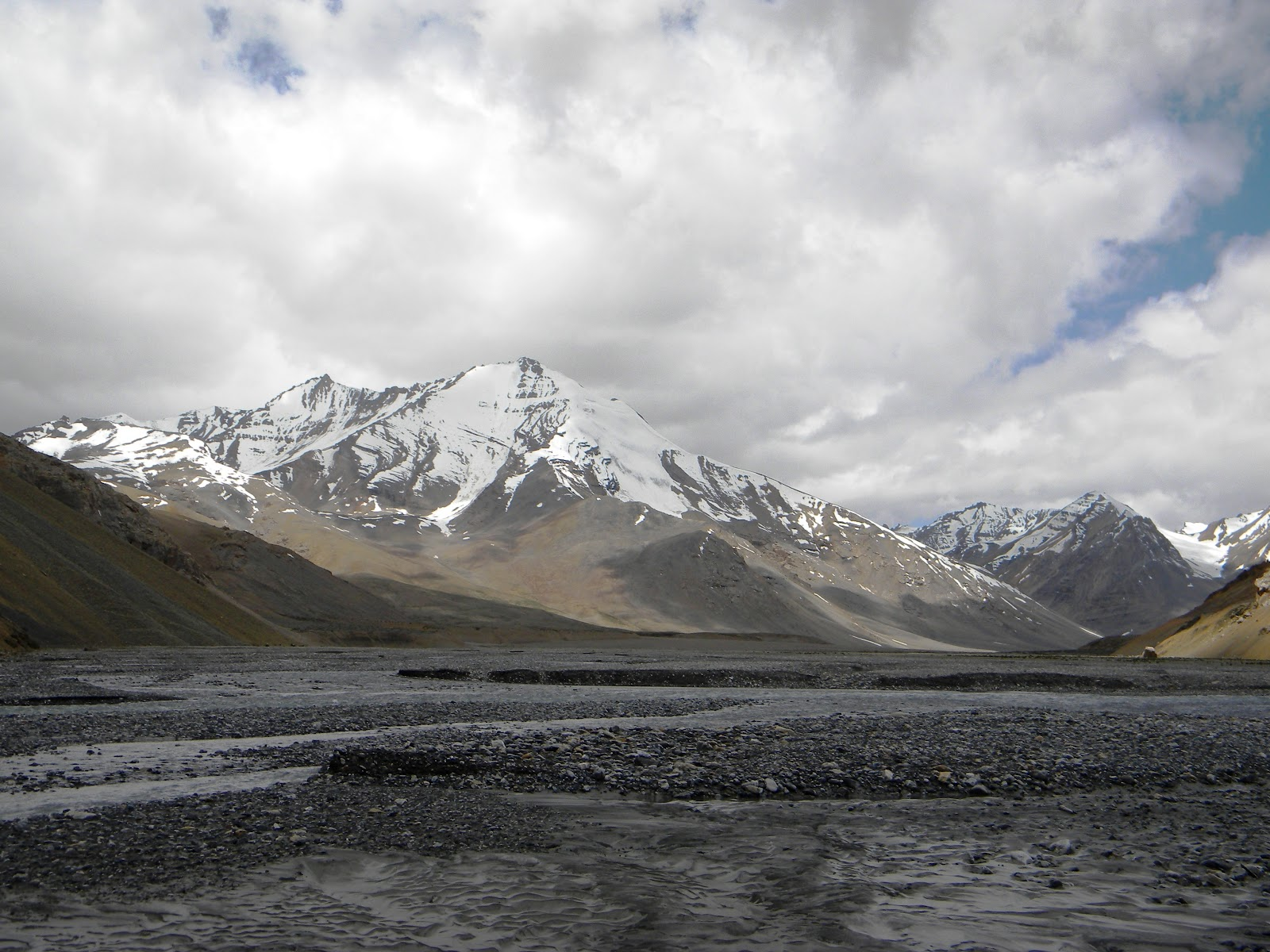
Takling valley

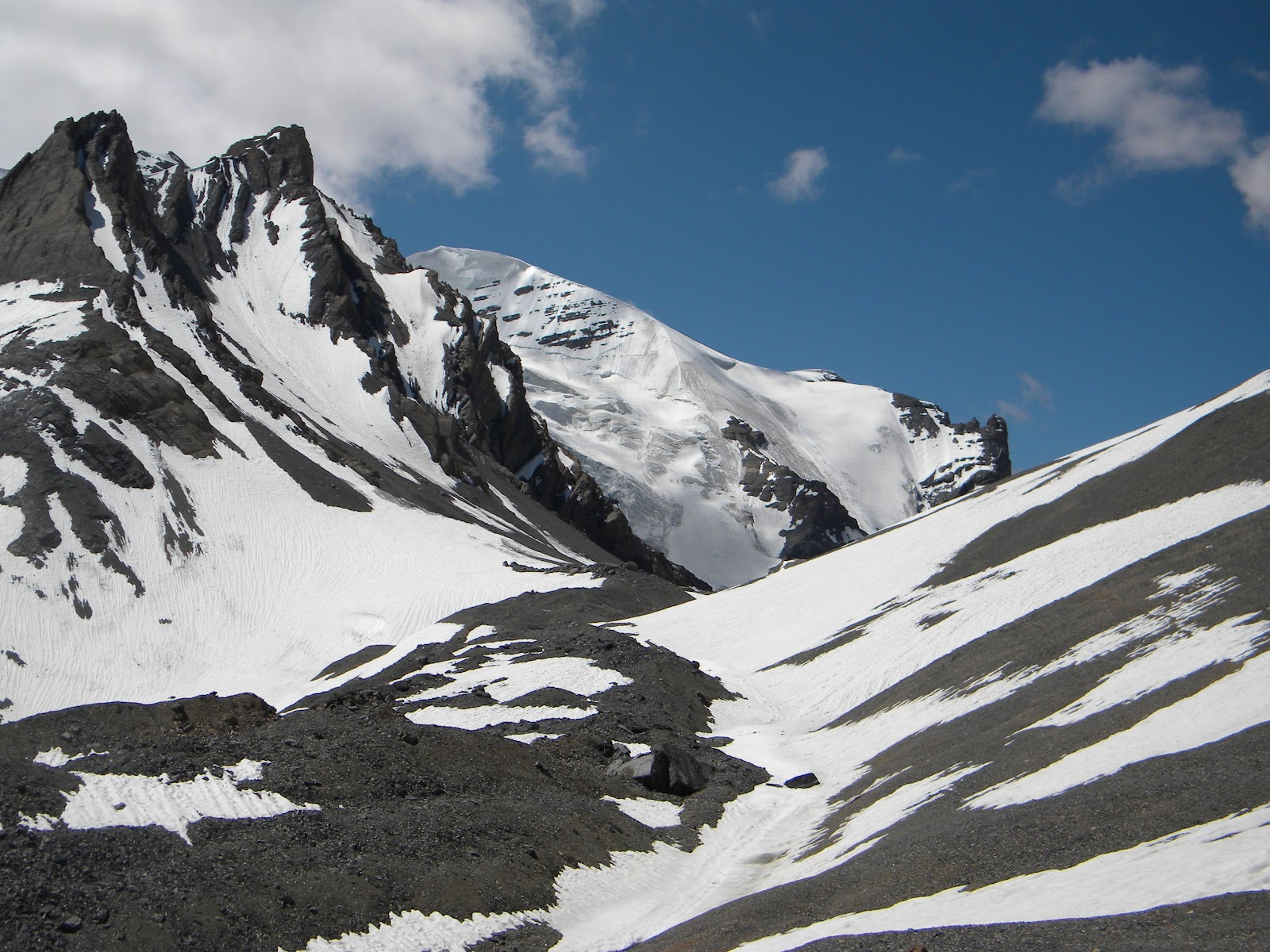
Takling Pass

== See also ==
- Geography of Ladakh
- Tourism in Ladakh
- Borasu pass, on border of Himachal and Uttarakhand near Tibet border
- Saach Pass, on border of Himachal and Uttarakhand south of Borasu pass
- Rupin Pass, in Uttarakhand near the Tibet border
- Pin Parvati Pass, in Uttarakhand further south of Rupin pass
