= Pin Parbati Pass =

Mountain pass in Himachal Pradesh, India

Coordinates: 31.8437°N 77.8421°E

The Pin Parbati Pass (also written Pin Parvati Pass) is a mountain pass in Himachal Pradesh, India, at 5,319 m (17,451 ft). Records show it was first crossed in August 1884 by Sir Louis Dane in search of an alternate route to the Spiti valley, but the shepherds from spiti used to do it often for grazing their sheep in the lush green parvati valley. This pass connects the fertile and lush Parbati valley on the Kullu side with the barren high-altitude Pin valley on the Spiti side.

It is a popular trekking route today. The trek route starts from Mud village on the Spiti side. An Army expedition attempted the 155 km route in 2013.

== See also ==
- Takling La (Pass), on borer of Himachal and Ladakh
- Borasu pass, on border of Himachal and Uttarakhand near Tibet border
- Saach Pass, on border of Himachal and Uttarakhand south of Borasu pass
- Rupin Pass, in Uttarakhand near the Tibet border
- Pin Valley National Park, and Pin Parvati Pass Uttarakhand are further south of Rupin pass
