= Dhaula =

Coordinates: 30°10′N 74°34′E

- village
- Interactive map of Dhaula
- Country: India
- State: Uttarakhand
- District: Uttarkashi
- Elevation: 1,500 m (4,900 ft)

Languages
  - Official: Hindi
- Time zone: UTC+5:30 (IST)
- Vehicle registration: UK
- Website: uk.gov.in

Dhaula is a small hamlet in Uttarkashi district of Uttarakhand. It is the starting point for the Rupin Pass trek.
