= Borasu Pass =

Mountain pass on Kinnaur-Garhwal Himalayan range

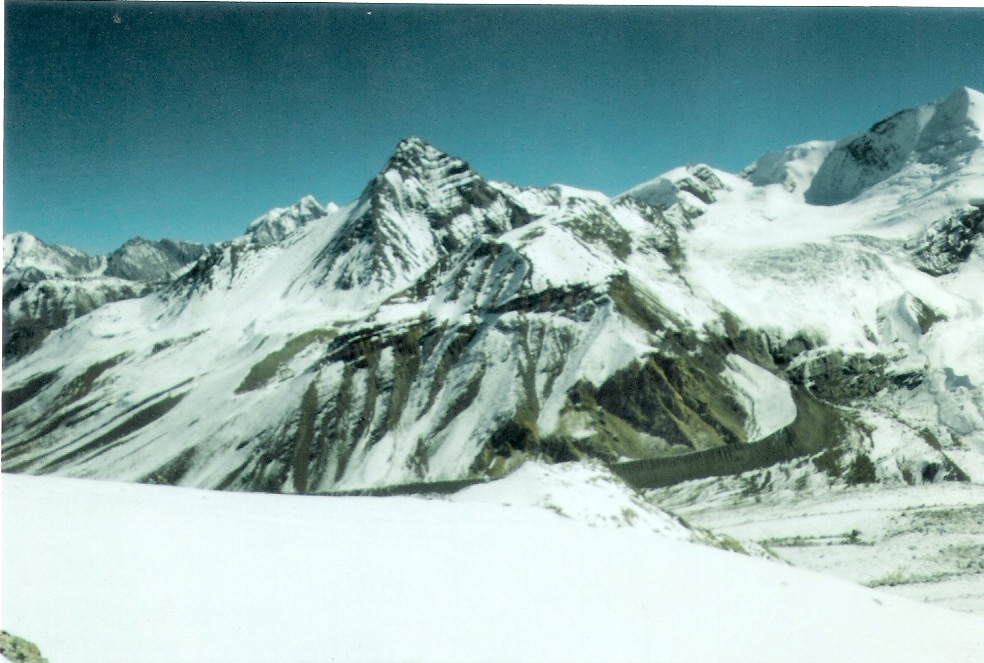
- Borasu Pass frontside
- Interactive map of Borasu Pass
- Elevation: 5,450 metres (17,880 ft)

Third Approach
- Location: Har Ki Doon, Uttarakhand
- Range: Western Himalaya-Garhwal Himalaya Range
- Coordinates: 31°14′00″N 78°29′00″E

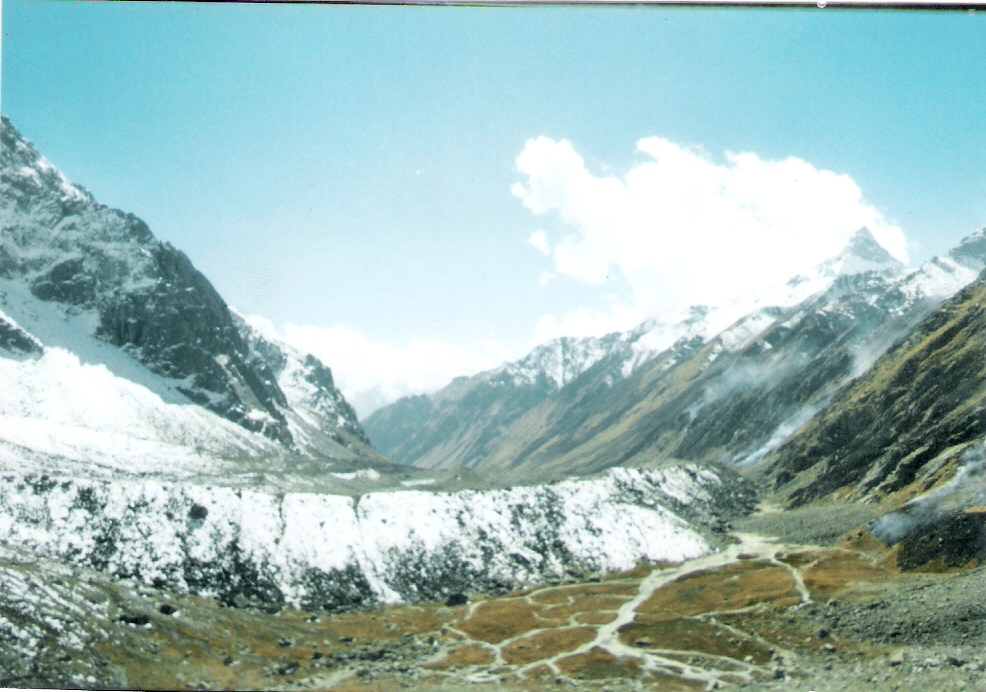
View from Lamjoonga

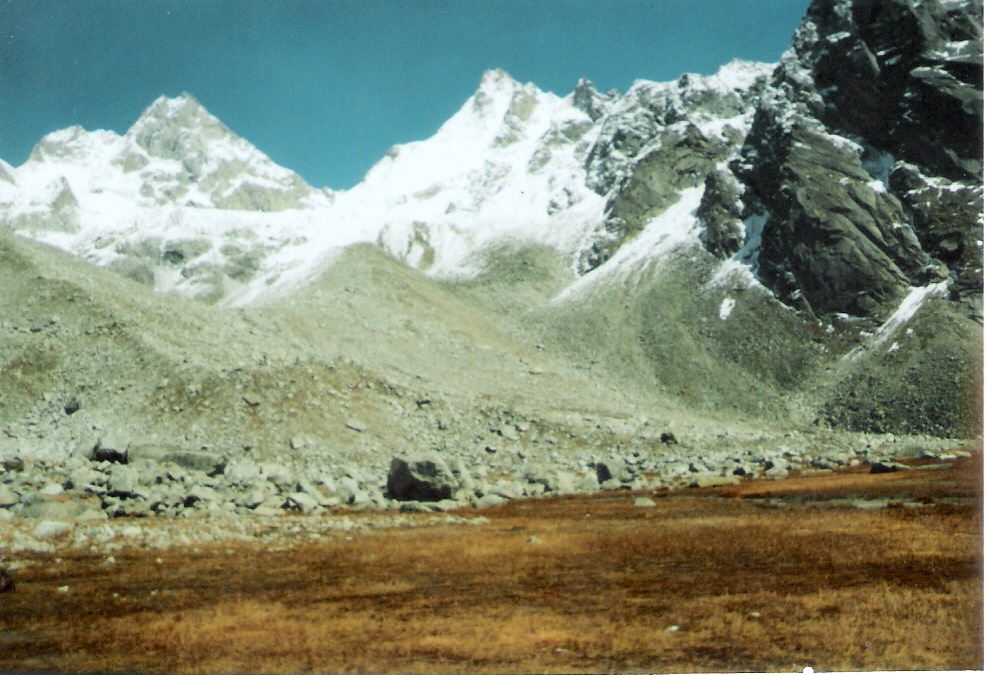
Borasu Pass from Rathado campsite

Borasu Pass or Bara-su (el. 5,450 m or 17,880 ft) is a high mountain pass in the Himalaya Mountains of Uttarakhand in the India. The pass is located on the border of Uttarakhand and Himachal Pradesh near the border with Tibet. It was an ancient trade route between Har Ki Doon valley and Kinnaur valley.

== Geography ==
Borasu Pass divides Uttarakhand from Himachal Pradesh. The pass is located only a few kilometers from the Tibet border. The east part of the Borasu area comes out from Tons valley and the north-west part is merged with Baspa valley. Its north-west range comes down on Jhukia Glacier. The nearest village, Chitkul, is 20.3 km (12.6 mi)away from the pass. on the Himachal Pradesh (Kinnaur valley) side and Osla village on the Uttarakhand side of the pass.

Approach to the pass is marked by grasslands. Mountains Bandarpunch, Black Peak or Kalanag, Swargarohini and Har Ki Doon may be observed from the pass.

== Climate ==
In summer, temperatures range from 0 °C (32 °F) to more lower. After November, the temperature falls down to several degree lower from 0 °C (32 °F). Precipitation in Baspa Valley is low in scale. Comparatively in the side of Tons valley rainfall is often common. Generally, snowfall is received after October.

== See also ==
- Takling La (Pass), on borer of Himachal and Ladakh
- Saach Pass, on border of Himachal and Uttarakhand south of Borasu pass
- Rupin Pass, in Uttarakhand near the Tibet border
- Pin Parvati Pass, in Uttarakhand further south of Rupin pass
