= 4th Ave Food Park =

Community center in Gainesville, Florida

Coordinates: 29°38′53″N 82°19′44″W

- Location: 409 SW 4th Ave; Gainesville, Florida, US
- Opening date: 2019
- Owner: Tim and Bret Larson
- Environment: Outdoor, open-air
- Goods sold: Food
- Days normally open: Every day
- Number of tenants: 6
- Website: 4thavefoodpark.com
- Interactive map of 4th Ave Food Park

4th Ave Food Park is a community center in Gainesville, Florida, located in the city's Innovation District and Porters neighborhood. It is the location of various restaurants and hosts local community markets.

The food park began operation in 2019, and as of 2026, it houses six eateries.

== History ==
Tim and Bret Larson originally bought the land the food park is on to house the roasting facility for their local Opus Coffee business. Though the food park began operating in 2019, the space held a ceremony for the completion of its outdoor space and the grand opening of the Opus Airstream location on January 11, 2020. When it began operating in 2019, the food park was noted for housing Humble Wood Fire, a pizza food truck; the then-named Fehrenbacher's Artisan Sausages; Sublime Tacos, a taco shop formerly named Cilantro Tacos; and the Opus Airstream. Humble Wood Fire later transitioned its 4th Ave Food Park location into a bagel shop, with the business moving its pizza operations to the city's South Main Station. Feliz Flavors, an ice cream food truck operating during weekends, opened up at the park in 2021. In 2022, the city banned parking in the empty lot next to the food park, causing parking issues.

Other businesses have since opened at the food park including Muñecas Taco Garden and Bar, Dry Wrought Cider Tap Room, and Satch^{2} (or Satch Squared; later renamed SquareHouse Pizza). The latter was opened up by Stephen "Satchel" Raye and Mark Rodriguez on July 2020. Raye founded Satchel's Pizza in Gainesville, while Rodriguez was a daytime general manager at the pizzeria and maintained involvement in the restaurant's leadership and operations. After visiting Detroit with a restaurant manager in the fall of 2019 for a pizza tour, Raye was inspired to introduce Detroit-style pizzas to Satchel's. Announced in early 2020, Satch^{2} was opened up at 4th Ave Food Park on July 20, 2020. In June 2023, Rodriguez bought all of Raye's shares in the 4th Ave Food Park location, renaming it to SquareHouse Pizza.

Dry Wrought opened on November 10, 2023, serving items using only vegan and gluten-free ingredients. Muñecas Taco Garden and Bar opened its 4th Ave location in January 2024, with the restaurant holding a Roaring '20s-themed grand opening party and organizing a raffle to benefit the local Porters Quarters Community Farm. Founded in 2017, it was previously located next to Bo Diddley Community Plaza.

== Businesses ==
4th Ave Food Park is located at 409 SW 4th Ave, on the eastern side of Gainesville, Florida's Innovation District. The space is also within the city's Porters neighborhood. The location houses various eateries and food trucks.

As of 2026, the food park's eateries include:

- BakerBaker, a bakery. The bakery's owner bakes the pastries for Opus.
- Fehrenbacher's Meats & Eats, a meat market and eatery
- Humble Wood Fire Bagel Shop, a bagel shop which originally served pizza
- Muñecas Taco Garden and Bar, owned by local restaurateur Art Guy. Using locally-sourced ingredients, the restaurant serves South Florida-inspired and Asian fusion tacos, burritos, and quesadillas.
- Opus Coffee Airstream, a location of the local coffee chain. Opened in 2019, the location serves its coffee out of a renovated 1976 Airstream trailer.
- SquareHouse Pizza, a pizzeria serving Detroit-style pizza and square waffles.

== Culture ==
The location has also hosted several maker events featuring local businesses; makers in the queer community have been specifically highlighted at these events.

One staff writer for the Gainesville Sun wrote that the food park "provides a proper showcase for local eateries", adding "certainly it better distinguishes our community than the chain restaurants and stores in Butler Plaza and Celebration Pointe". Writing for The Independent Florida Alligator, Emily Moreno opined that "The 4th Ave Food Park is a quintessential example of the cultural identity of Gainesville."

In March and April 2025, respectively, Humble Wood Fire and Fehrenbacher's were featured in two separate episodes of Diners, Drive-Ins and Dives series on the Food Network, hosted by restaurateur and television presenter Guy Fieri.

On January 30, 2026, Humble Wood Fire's bagel shop closed in solidarity of nationwide protests in response to actions conducted by U.S. Immigration and Customs Enforcement (ICE) during the agency's operations in Minnesota.
