= Rupin Pass =

High altitude pass across the Himalaya mountain range

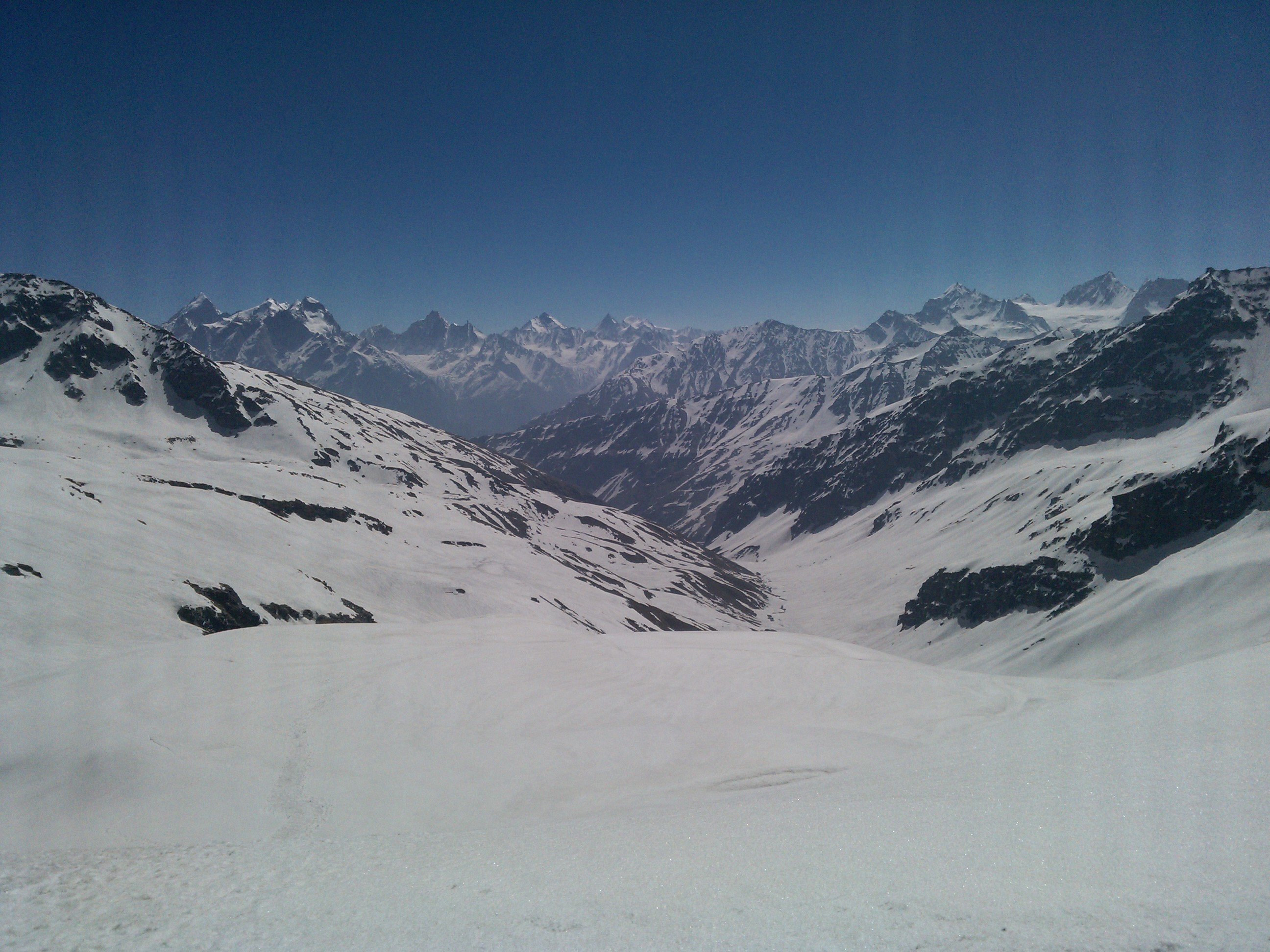
- View from Rupin Pass

- Location within Himachal Pradesh
- Elevation: 4,650 m (15,260 ft)
- Traversed by: From Rupin Valley, Uttaranchal to Sangla Valley, Himachal Pradesh

Third Approach
- Location: India
- Range: Dhauladhar
- Coordinates: 31°20′41″N 78°09′52″E

Rupin Pass is a high altitude pass across the Himalaya mountain range in Himachal Pradesh, India. It lies on a traditional shepherd and hiking route which starts from Dhaula in Uttarakhand and ends in Sangla in Himachal Pradesh. The path itself is located across mostly uninhabited areas in the Himalayan ranges at an elevation of 15,250 ft (4,650M) above sea level. Sarasvati Glacier at Sarasvotri at this pass has been identified by some sources as the origin of paleo-river Sarasvati which turned in to icy waters at Netwar, flowing through Paonta Sahib and Adi Badri, Haryana, Punjab, Rajasthan and Gujarat.

== Description ==
Rupin Pass consists of trails dug out of rock faces and wooden bridges, cut through deep dark folds in the mountain, glaciers and icy slopes, and over snow fields. Along the way there are white Rhododendrons and expanses of green meadows.

There are different trails that access the Rupin Pass. One of them starts at the sleepy village of Gosangu which is the last road head of Himachal Pradesh. Generally, trekkers and adventurers travel to Gosangu by road from Shimla via Rohru. The alternate route to Rupin Pass starts from Naitwar, which is accessible from Dehradhun via Dhaula. From either of the two road heads, the first camp is Jhaka, the hanging village and the last stop for replenishing stocks and a look at the civilization. Traveling the Rupin Pass is a moderate – difficult level of climbing. The trails follow the Rupin river all the way to the top (Upper waterfall camp).

Rupin pass is unique in a way that the ice melting on the one side of the pass forms the Rupin river that merges with Yamuna and eventually flows into the Bay of Bengal while the snow melting on the Sangla side of the pass merges into a stream the eventually flow into Sutlaj and hence flows into the Arabian sea.

=== Access ===
Rupin pass is at an altitude of 15250 ft above MSL and to reach here follow the Dhaula 5,100 ft to Gosangu 6,300 ft.11 km. Via Sewa – Gosangu 6,300 ft to Jhaka 8,700 ft.9 km Via Jiskun 7,600 ft. - Jhaka 8,700 ft to Saruwas thatch 11,150 ft. 6 km. Via Uduknal – Saruwas thatch 11,150 ft to thatch 11,680 ft (lower water fall camp) 6 km. - thatch 11,680 ft to the top of the Rupin waterfall 13,120 ft – thatch 11,680 ft to Rupin pass 15,250 ft

== Gallery ==
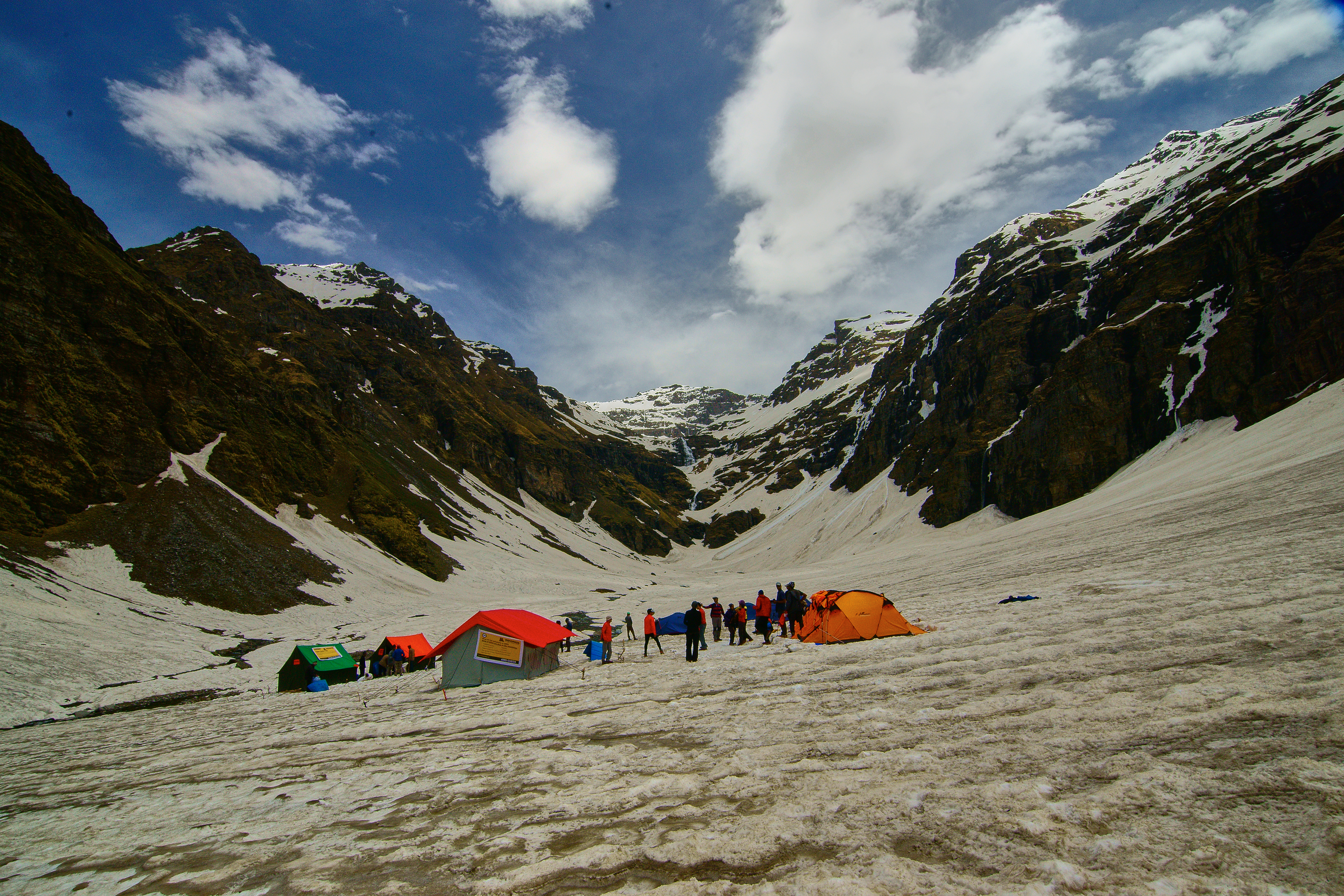
View of Rupin Waterfall

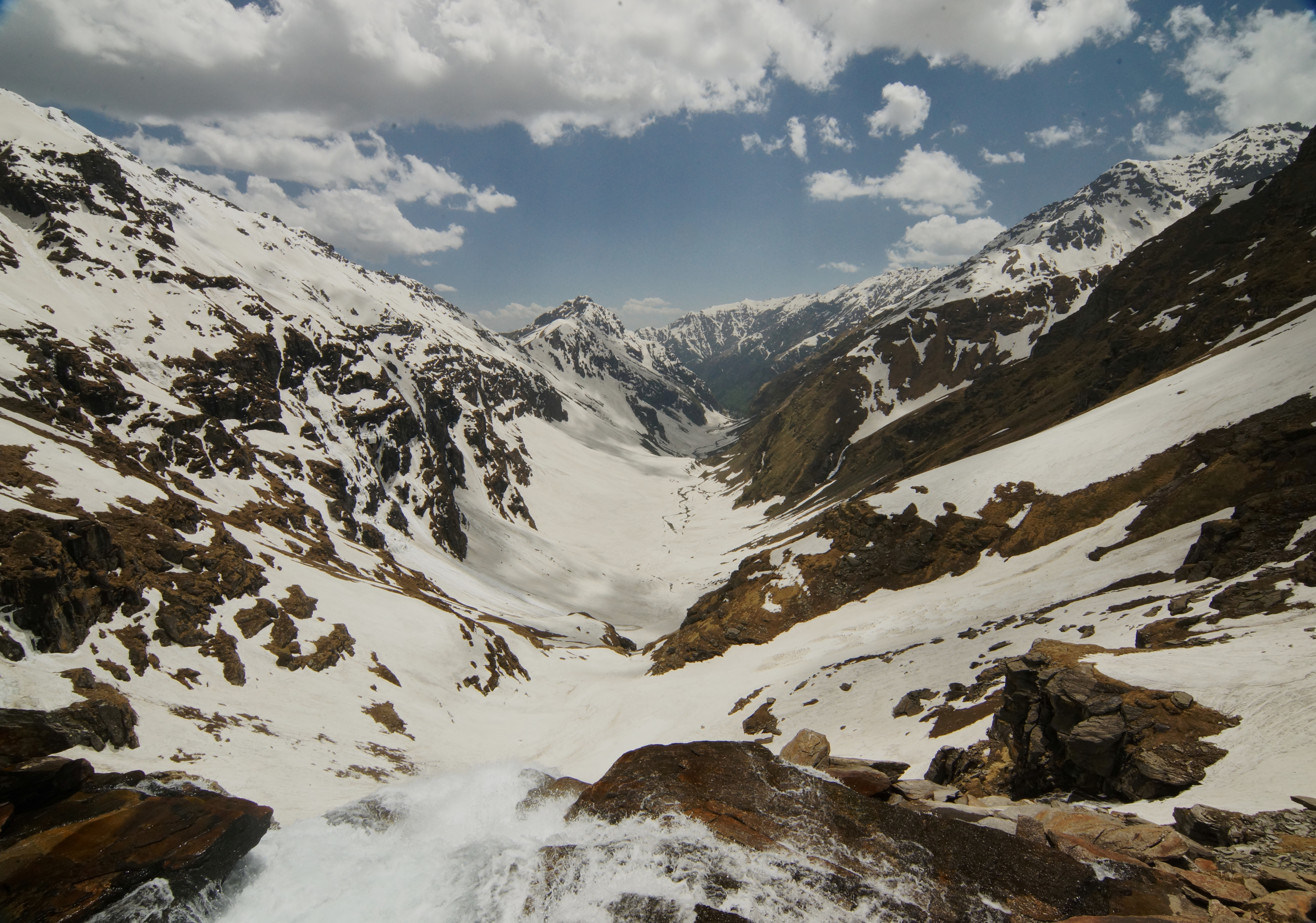
View of the valley from Rupin waterfall en route to Rupin Pass

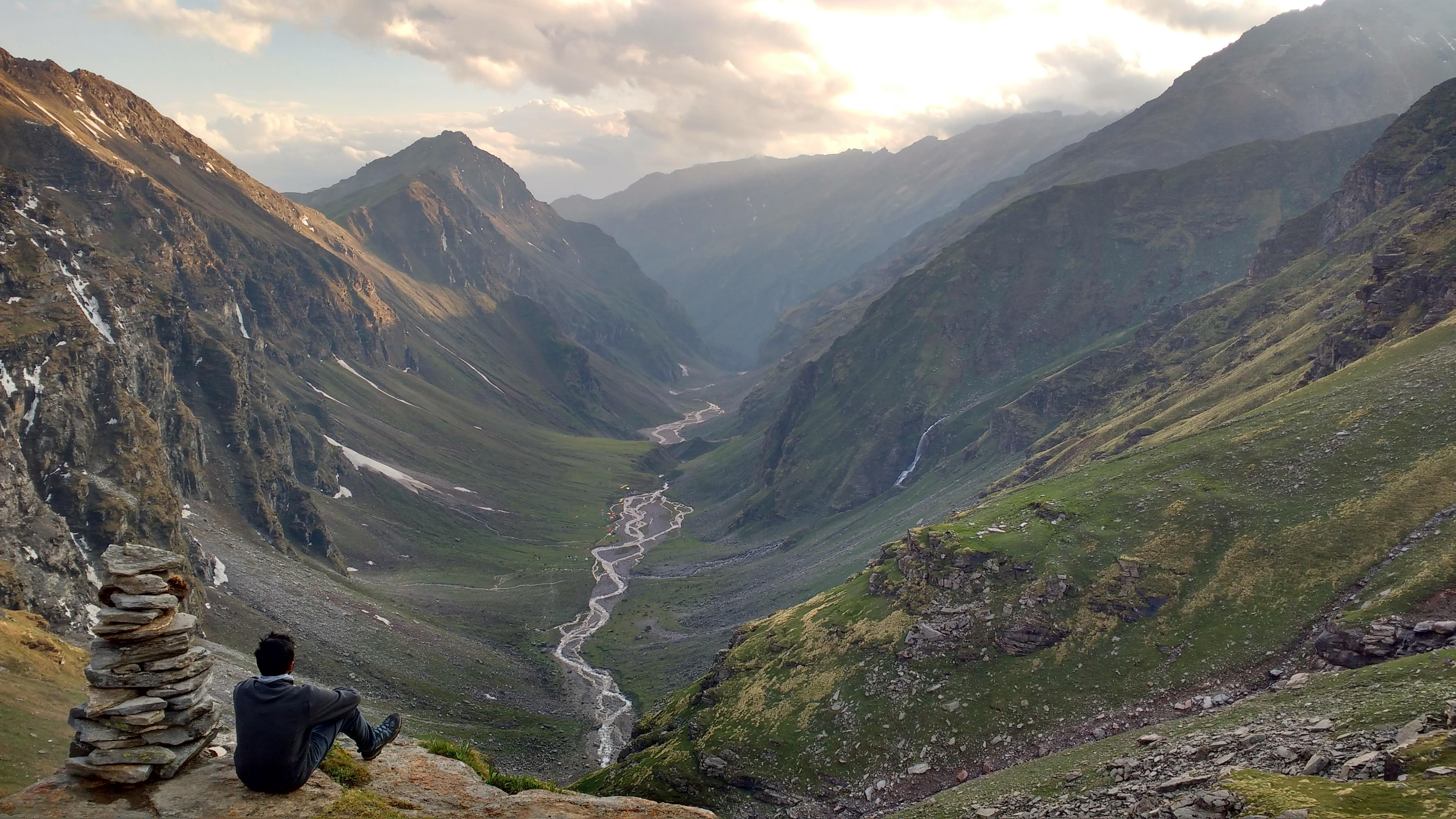

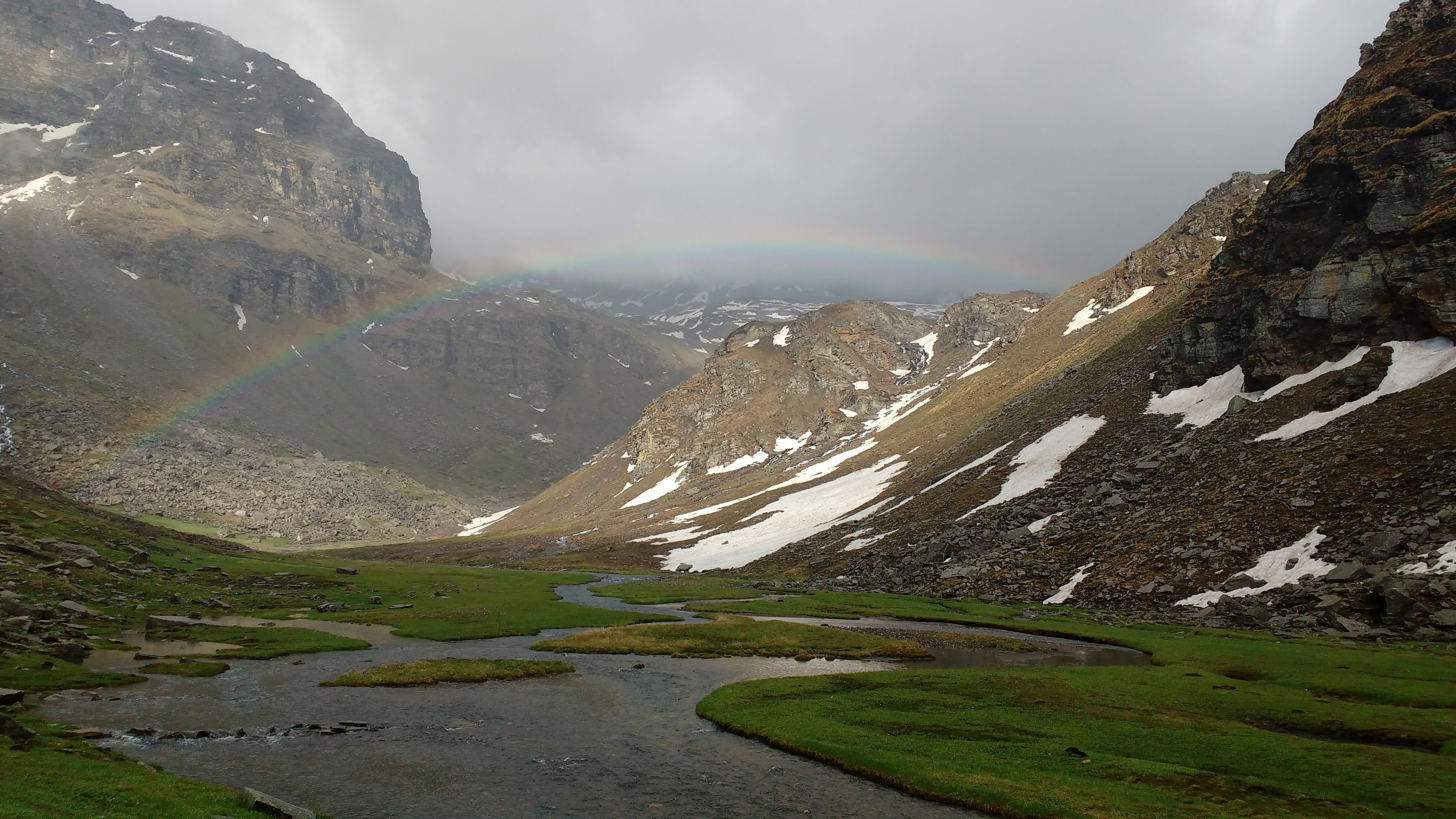

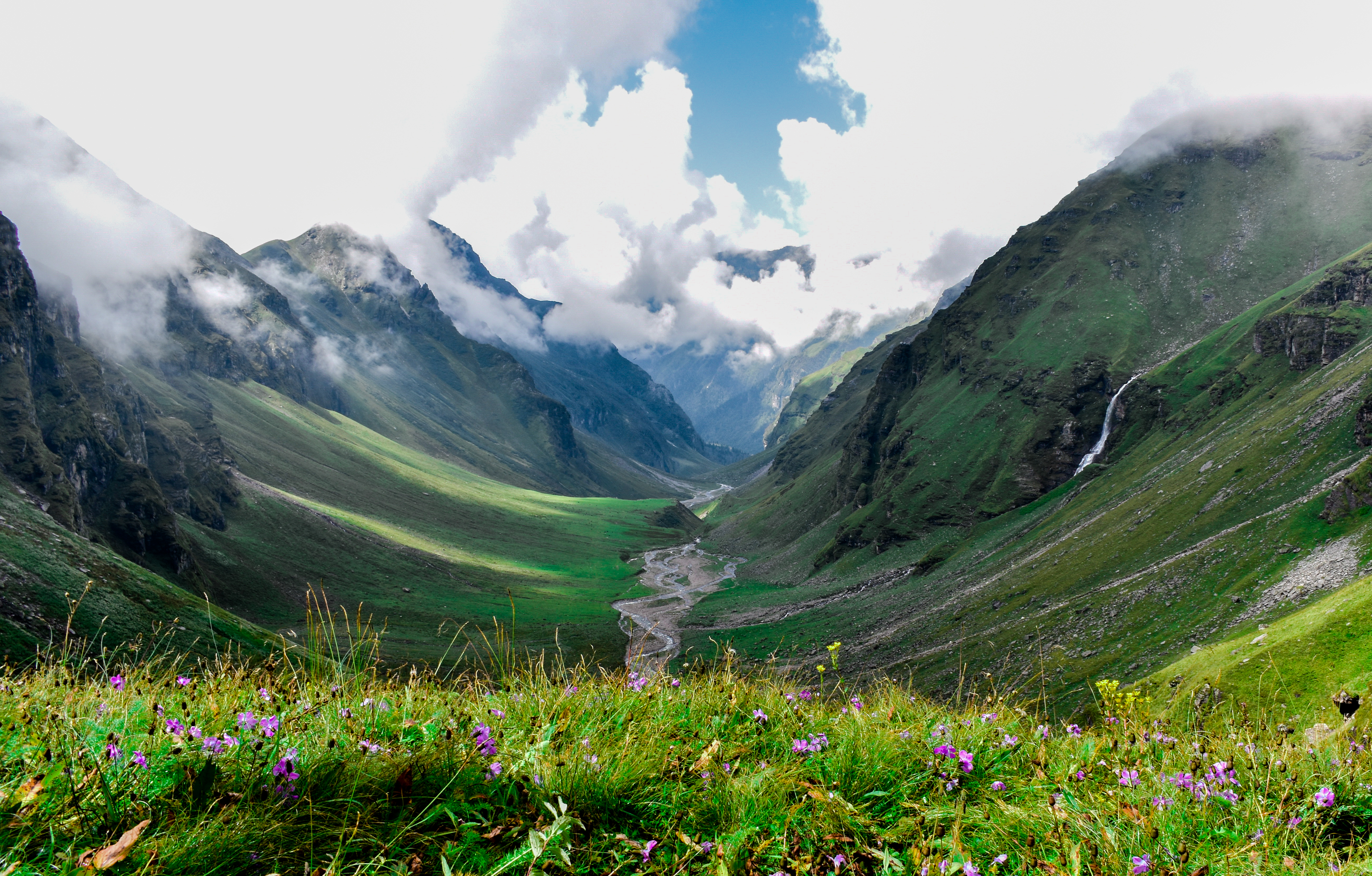
View of the Meadows in Rupin Pass

== See also ==
- Takling La (Pass), on borer of Himachal and Ladakh
- Borasu pass, on border of Himachal and Uttarakhand near Tibet border
- Saach Pass, on border of Himachal and Uttarakhand south of Borasu pass
- Pin Parvati Pass, in Uttarakhand further south of Rupin pass
