= Blanche Satchel =

Ziegfeld Girl

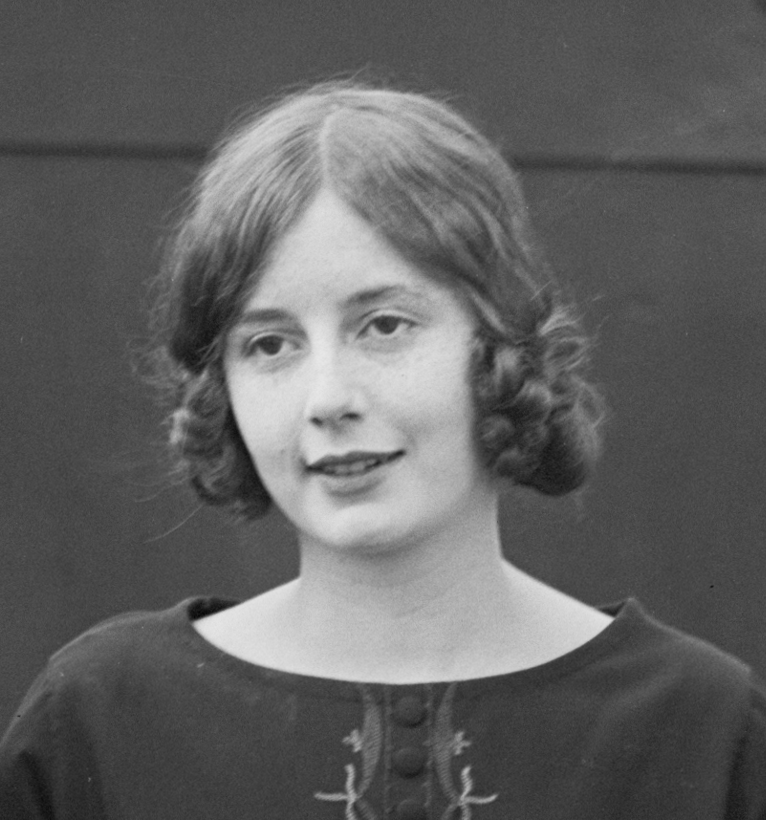
Blanche Satchel

Blanche Satchel was an Australian dancer and model.

== Biography ==
Satchel appeared in the Ziegfeld Follies and Earl Carroll's Vanities and was once Miss Australia. She came from London, England, with the Follies in 1925. Her height was 5'7", she weighed 123 pounds, and she had brown eyes. Her mother was an actress. She was linked romantically to aviator Charles Lindbergh according to newspaper stories in 1928.

Satchel was the subject of a number of nude paintings rendered by Howard Chandler Christy, who is famous for the Christy Girl. She is noted for posing for a portrait of Juliet which was presented to the Shakespeare Foundation. She also modeled for a series of murals which were displayed in an elegant hotel in Buffalo, New York. Christy once described her as "the most beautiful Titian-blonde in the world". In 1927 Satchel posed for a Lucky Strike cigarette advertisement with fellow Ziegfeld Girls Murrell Finley, Myrna Darby and Jean Ackerman.

== Personal life ==
She was the second wife of millionaire broker Max Bamberger. They wed in Greenwich, Connecticut on 20 June 1933. Satchel was awarded a divorce on a cruelty charge in September 1938. She died in New York in 2004.
