= Satchel's Pizza =

Pizzeria in Gainesville, Florida

Coordinates: 29.673952°N 82.301869°W

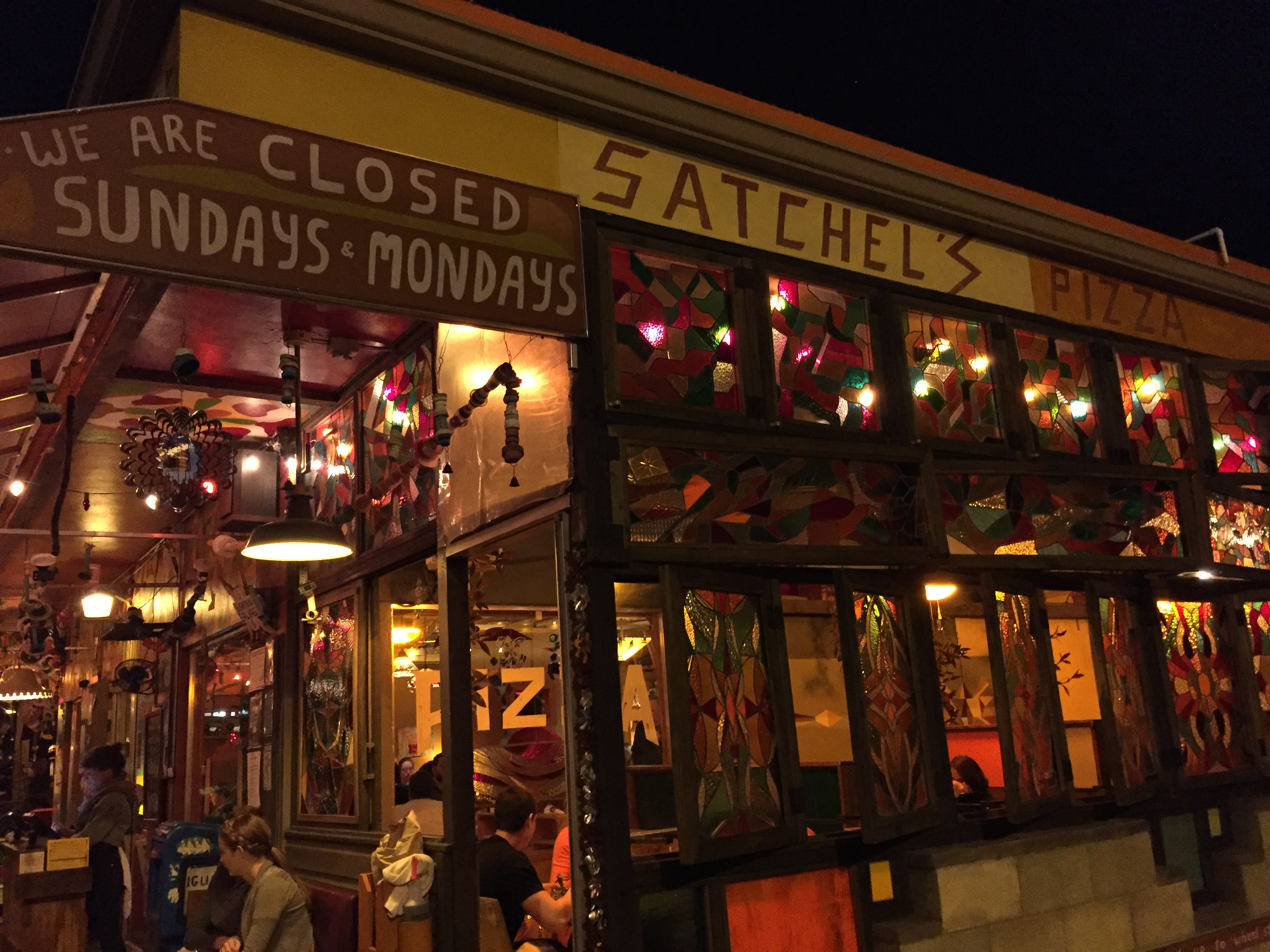
- Type: Private
- Industry: Restaurant
- Founded: Gainesville, Florida (2003)
- Key people: Satchel Raye, founder and owner
- Number of employees: 47
- Website: www.satchelspizza.com

Satchel's Pizza is a pizzeria in Gainesville, Florida. It was opened on March 7, 2003 by Satchel Raye.

Satchel's in Gainesville has become a well known and popular restaurant.

== History ==
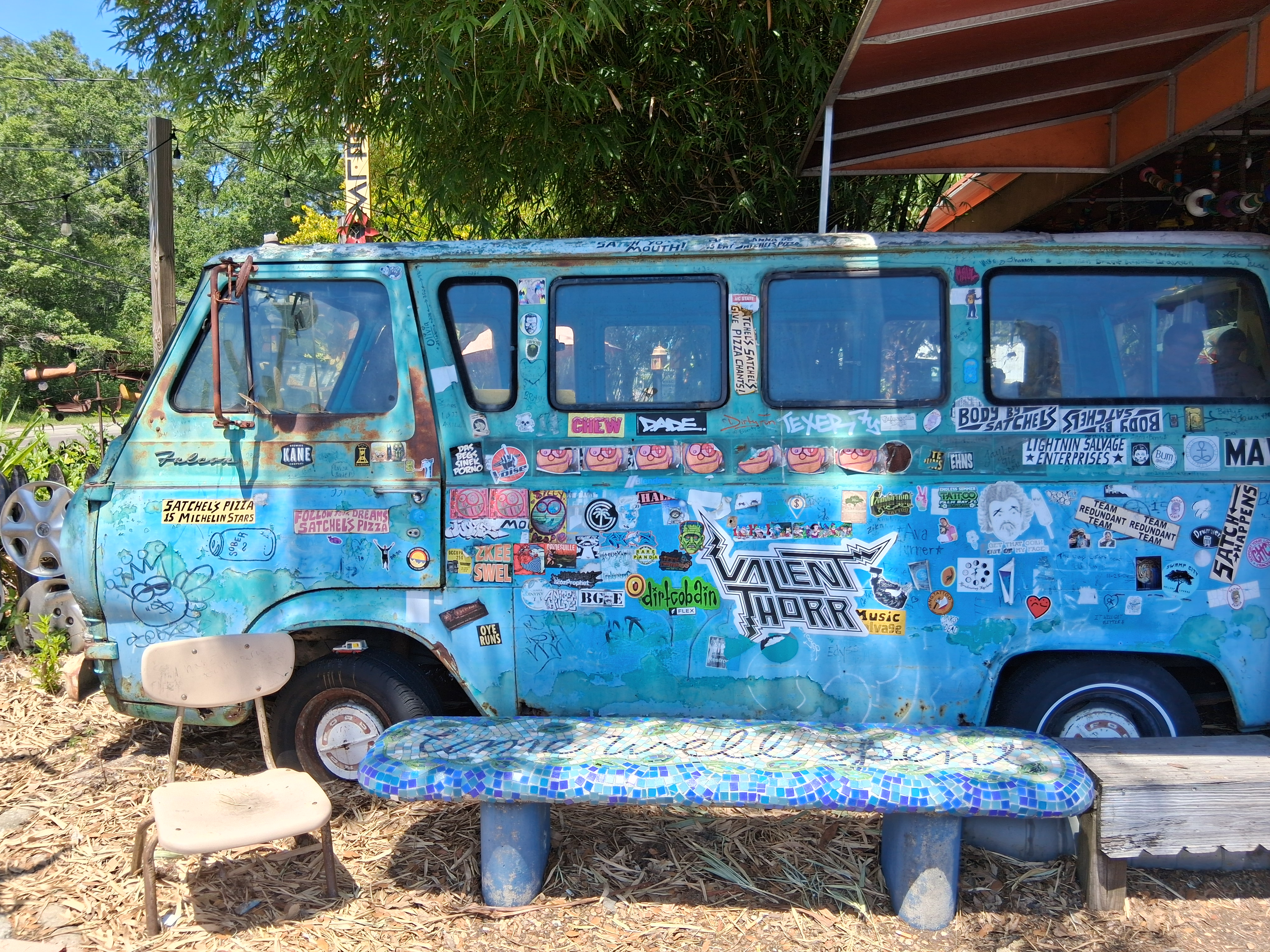

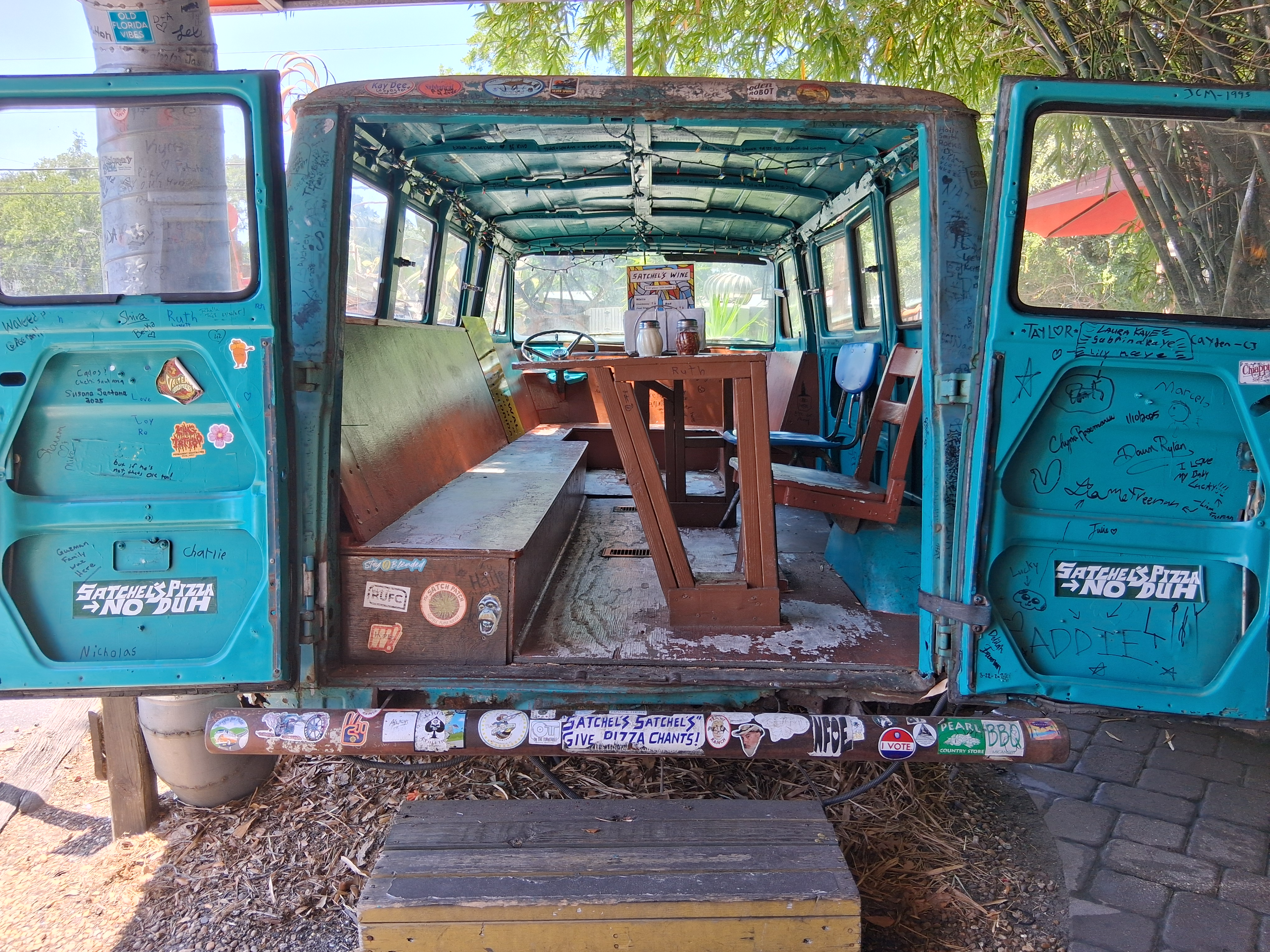
Raye Satchel's former travel van makes up part of the restaurant's outdoor seating

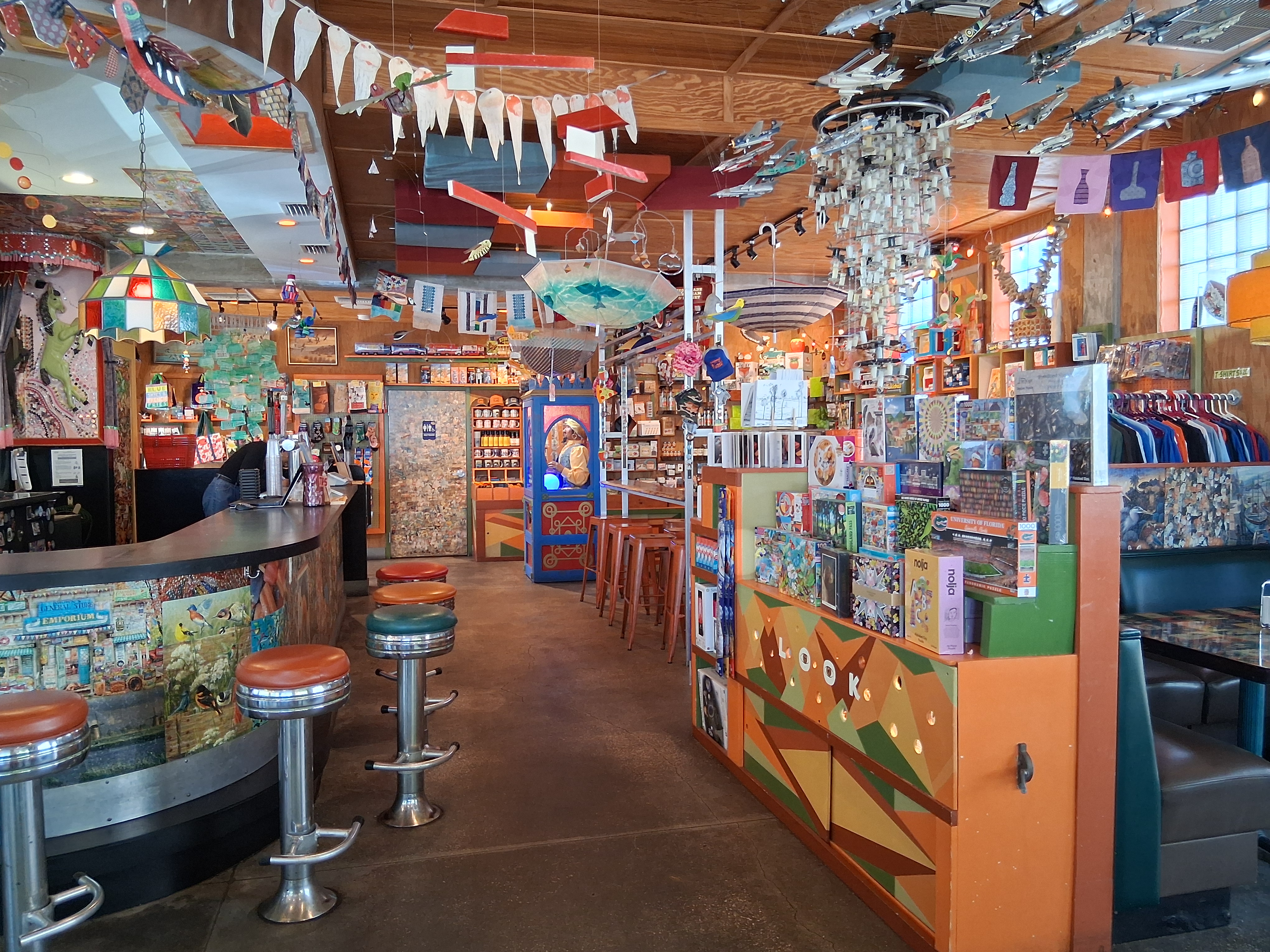
The restaurant's gift shop, known as Lightnin' Salvage

Satchel's Pizza was opened on March 7, 2003 by Satchel Raye, the founder and owner of the restaurant.

Raye decorated the restaurant with souvenirs that he had collected while traveling around the country after college. The van he used for travel is parked outside the restaurant and makes up part of the restaurant's outdoor seating.

=== Restaurant fire ===
On February 28, 2012, the restaurant caught fire. It reopened on June 14 of the same year. During the downtime, Satchel Raye used Indiegogo to raise funds for its 47 employees. Nearly 700 people made contributions in a 16-day period, providing a total of $37,696 to the restaurant.

=== Gift shop fire ===
On December 5, 2016, the restaurant's outdoor seating area and gift shop, known as Lightnin' Salvage, caught fire and was destroyed. The restaurant itself was unharmed and remained open. In November 2017, Raye announced plans to reopen Lightnin' Salvage as a two-story building.

The gift shop and live music venue reopened on December 5, 2017. A grand reopening event was later held on June 1, 2018.

=== Expansion ===
In 2018, a new outdoor playground was built by University of Florida architecture students.

In February 2020, Raye announced that he would be opening a second location named Satch^{2} at 4th Ave Food Park. The new location was officially opened on July 20, 2020. It was later sold off to a new owner and renamed SquareHouse Pizza in June 2023.

In May 2022, the University of Florida's new food provider Chartwells proposed the creation of a Satchel's Pizza location on campus during their contract negotiations.

=== Van fire ===
In December 2024, the restaurant's dining van was deliberately set on fire and sprayed with graffiti. The suspect was recorded by the restaurant's surveillance cameras and spotted at a nearby bar, but a miscommunication between the fire department and police department led to a delay in his arrest. The van was damaged but not destroyed and was reopened for seating after several weeks of renovations.

== Community involvement ==
Satchel's Pizza has periodically organized fundraisers for local and national charities, including a $4,000 donation to Girls on the Run.
