= Sache =

Sache or Saché may refer to:

== Places ==
- Saché, Indre-et-Loire, a commune in France
- Sache, Ethiopia, a town in Supena Sodo woreda, Oromia Region, Ethiopia
- Dôme de la Sache, mountain in Savoie, France

== Other uses ==
- Saché, a character in the Star Wars series
- Sač, a cooking utensil
- Mike Jones (rapper), American rapper who previously used the name "Sache"
