= Mouth (disambiguation) =

The mouth is the orifice through which an organism intakes food.

Mouth may also refer to:

- Human mouth
- River mouth, the source or terminus of a water body
- "Mouth" (Merril Bainbridge song), 1995
- "Mouth" (Bush song), 1996
- Mouth series, a collection of mashup albums by Neil Cicierega
- Mouth (hieroglyph), an Egyptian language symbol
- Mouth, a type of vertex in mathematics
- Mike Matusow (born 1968), professional poker player nicknamed "the Mouth"
- Half of the Dutch pop duo Mouth and MacNeal

Fictional characters

- Marvin "Mouth" McFadden, a character in the TV series One Tree Hill
- Mouth of Sauron, a character in J. R. R. Tolkien's Middle-earth legendarium
- Hoof and Mouth, characters in the Disney series Darkwing Duck

== See also ==
- Sigurd II of Norway (1133–1155), king of Norway whose epithet, Munn, means "the Mouth" in Old Norse
