= Satch =

Satch is a nickname for the following people:

- Joe Satriani (born 1956), instrumental rock guitarist
- Anand Satyanand (born 1944), Governor-General of New Zealand
- Satchel Paige (1906–1982), African-American baseball player
- Louis Armstrong (1901–1971), American jazz trumpeter and singer

== See also ==
- Satchel (disambiguation)
