= Saach Pass =

Mountain pass in Chamba District, Himachal Pradesh, India

Sachche Pass
- Saach Pass
- Location within Himachal Pradesh

Third Approach
- Coordinates: 33.006°N 76.240°E

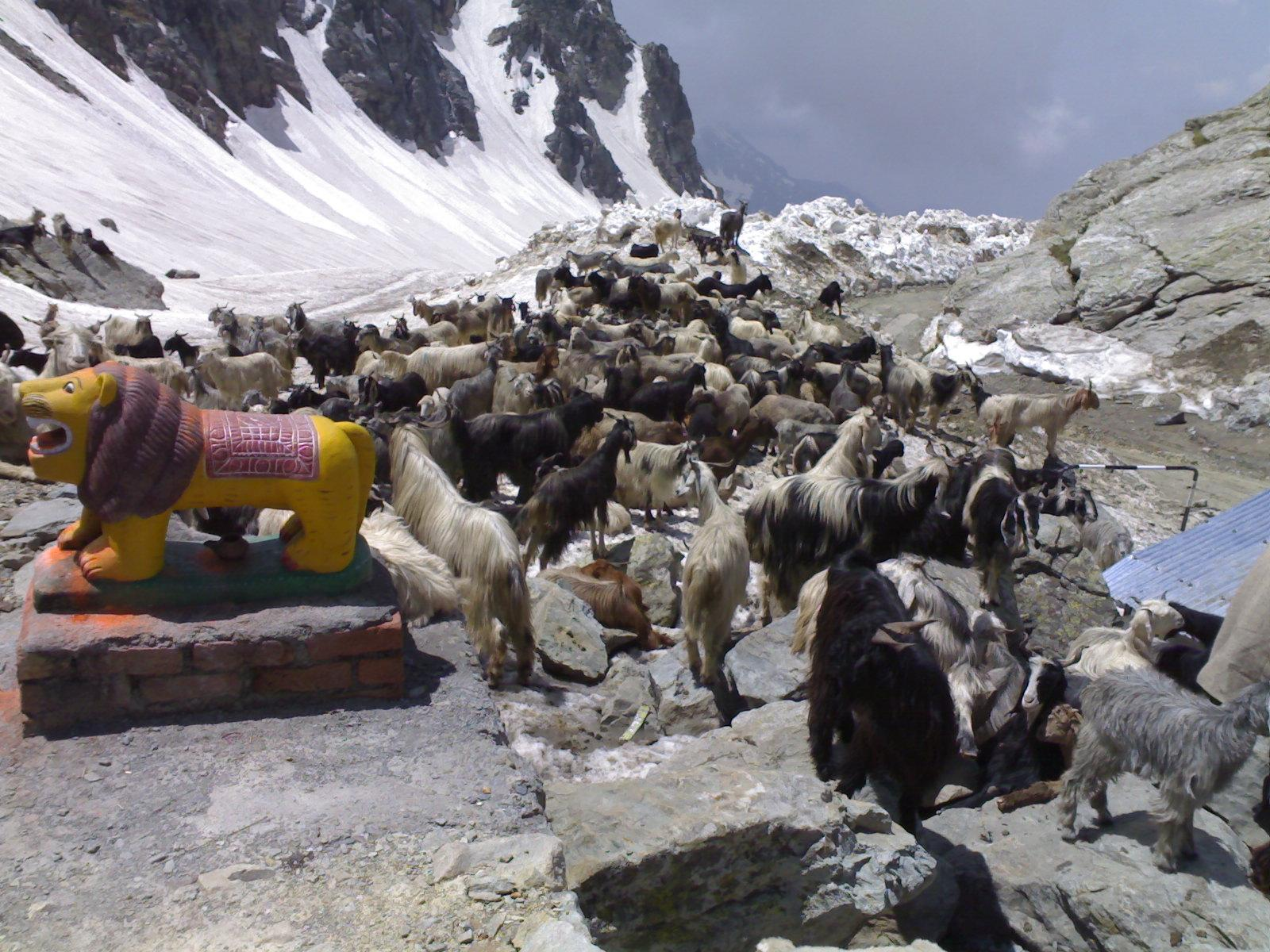

Sachche Pass also known wrongly as "Sach Pass", is a 4,414-metre-high (14,482 ft) mountain pass in Chamba District, Himachal Pradesh, India on the Pir Panjal range of the Himalayas. It is 127 km (79 mi) from the District Headquarters. It connects the Chamba valley with the Pangi valleys of Himachal Pradesh, India. There is a helipad on the ascent towards Sach pass from Bairagarh of Himachal Pradesh.

== Overview ==
The pass is open from June or early July to mid October. The road is narrow and unmetalled. It is the gateway to the Pangi Valley. It is the shortest and toughest route from Chamba to the Killar (170 km) and was newly constructed. Pangi is also accessible year-round from the Paddar Valley (Jammu & Kashmir) but it is a longer route as one has to take the Chamba to Baderwah or Udhampur road in Jammu & Kashmir.

== History ==
1998 Chamba massacre also took place at Satrundi & Kalaban when 35 Hindus and some buddhist, mostly labourers, were shot down by terrorists, and 11 were injured. They were working on the Saach Pass road. There was a lack of security but now whole area is under surveillance and is now getting more popular among trekkers and tourists.

== Importance ==
It is the shortest route to Killar. With the completion of this road (Sach Pass) the distance from Pathankot to Leh via Saach pass has been reduced to 670 km while the distance from Pathankot to Leh via Manali is 800 km (497 mi). So this road can be used by Indian Army.

== Transport ==
Sach pass can be reached from three directions, via Pathankot-Dalhousie road, Manali-Udaipur road, and Udhampur/Anantnag-Kishtwar-Paddar-Pangi road. The first is the shortest, more treacherous, and most popular route, given that the other routes are very long in comparison.

Sach Pass Tunnel is planned. See also tunnels in North West India.

The distance of Sach Pass from a few major places on all three routes are below.

Place	Distance (km)	Comments
Chamba	131	
Pathankot	250	It has railway connectivity.
Dalhousie		
Udhampur	300	It has railway connectivity.
Kishtwar	150	
Anantnag	300	
Udaipur	110	

== Gallery ==
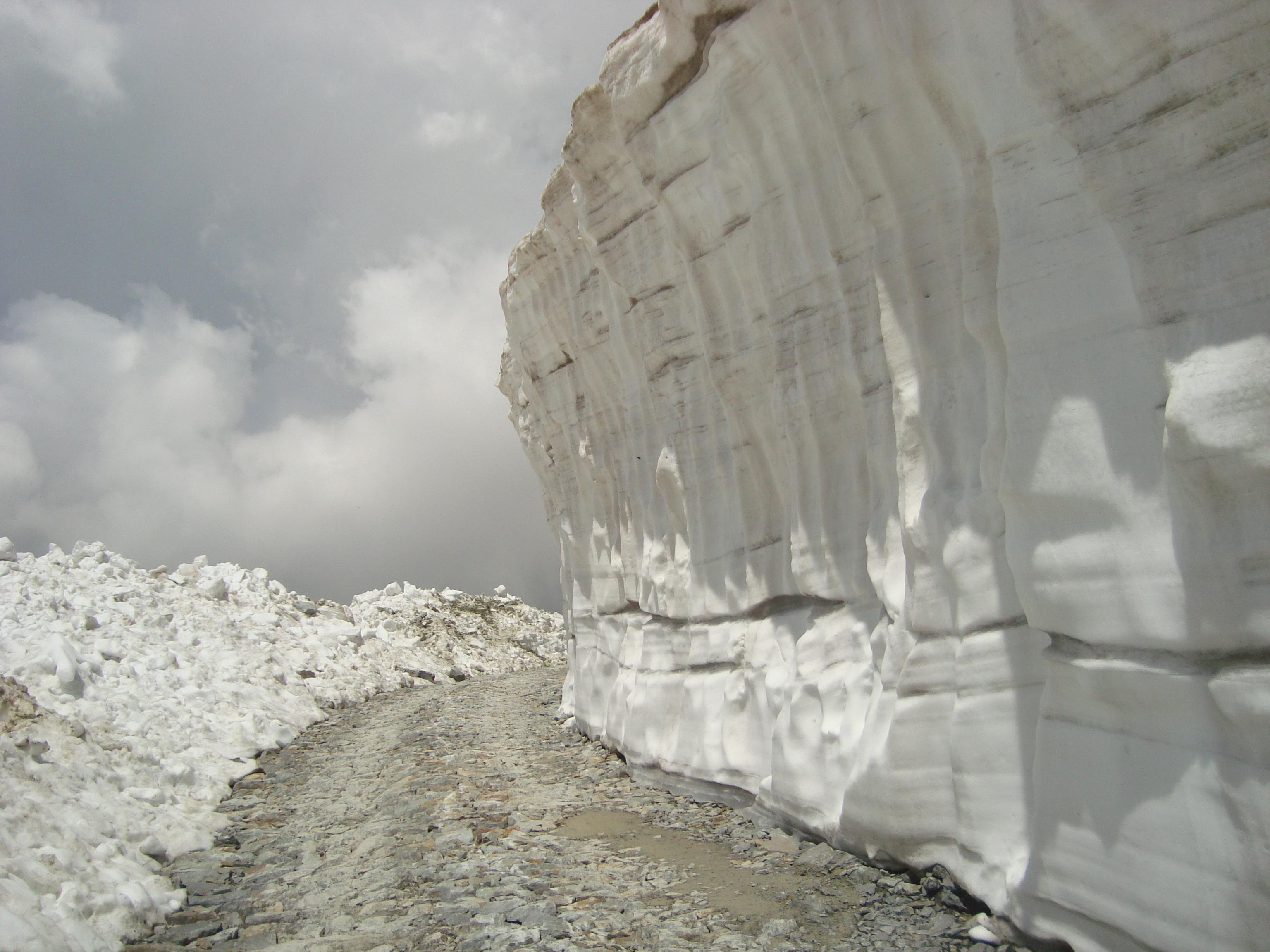
Snow walls on side of road

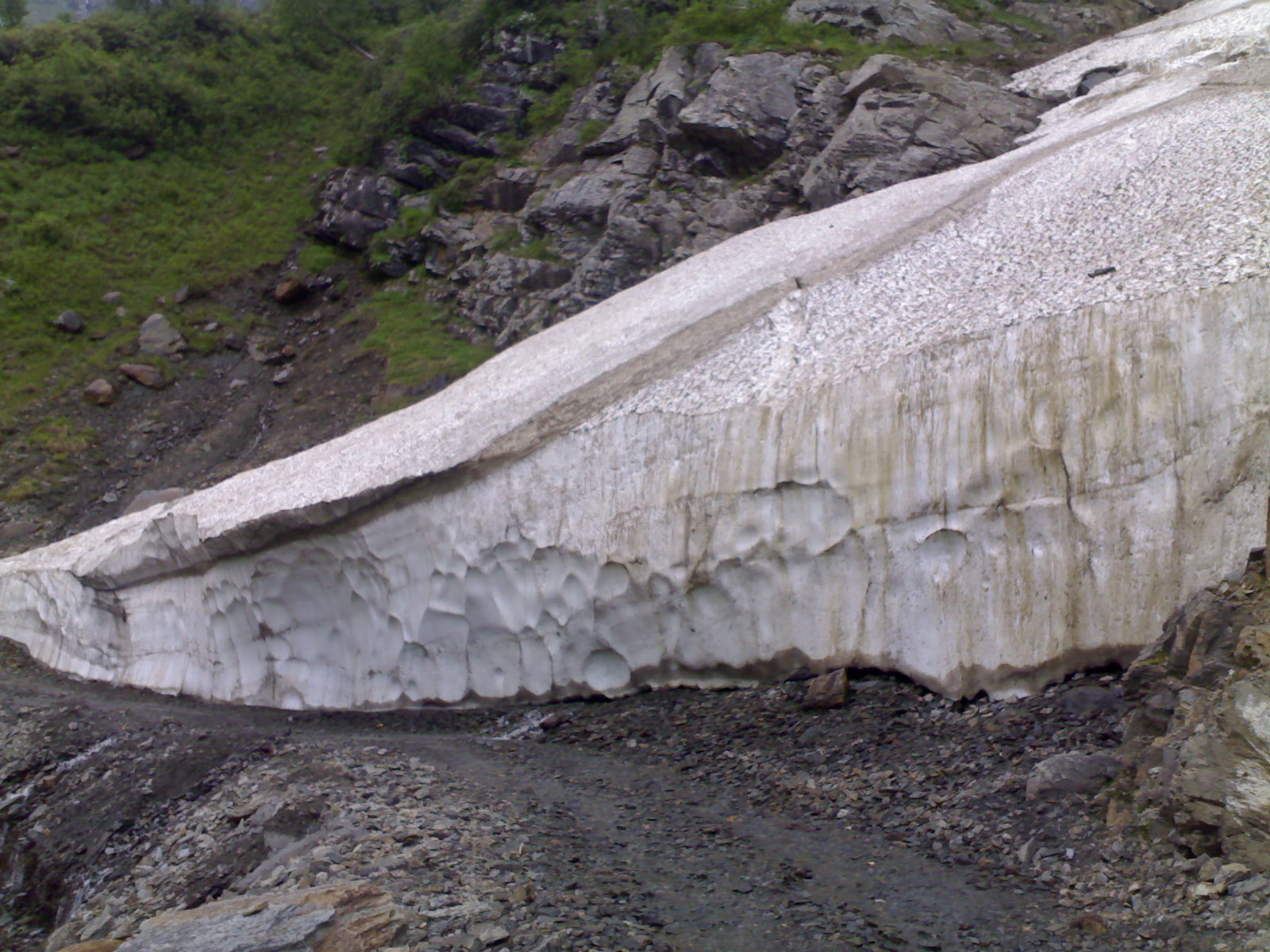
A glacier at Satrundi

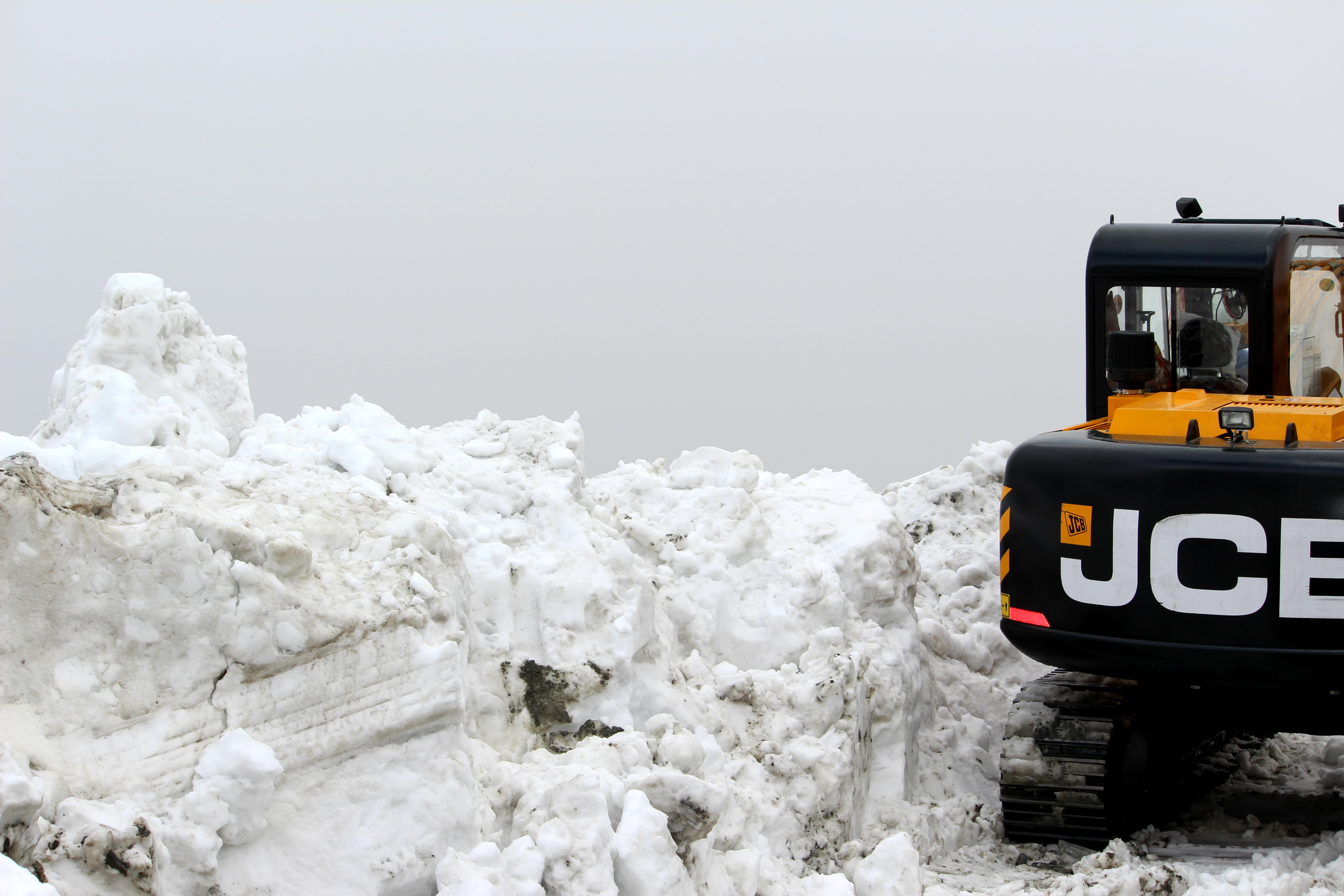
Road clearing machinery at the top of Saach Pass

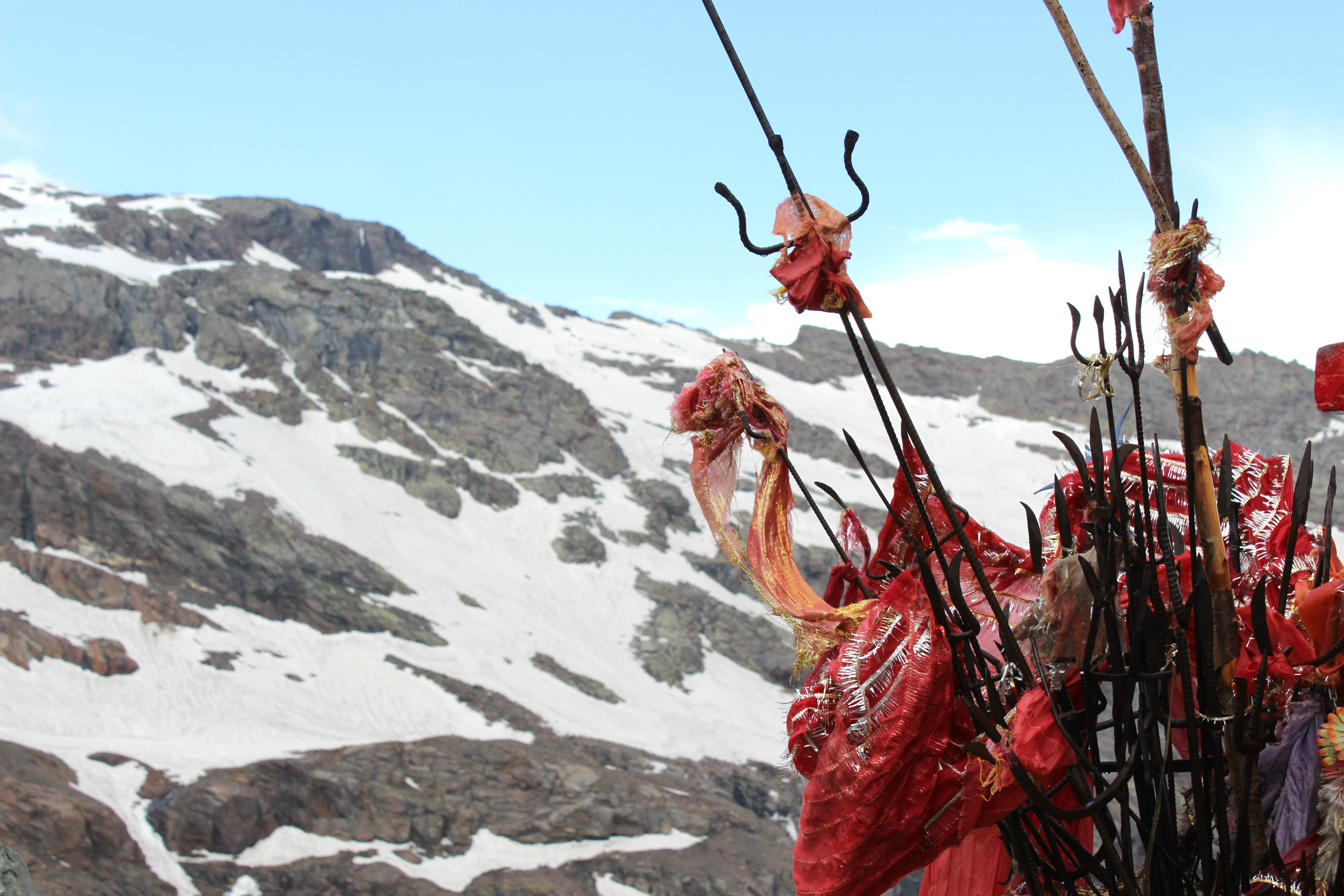
A temple at the Saach Pass

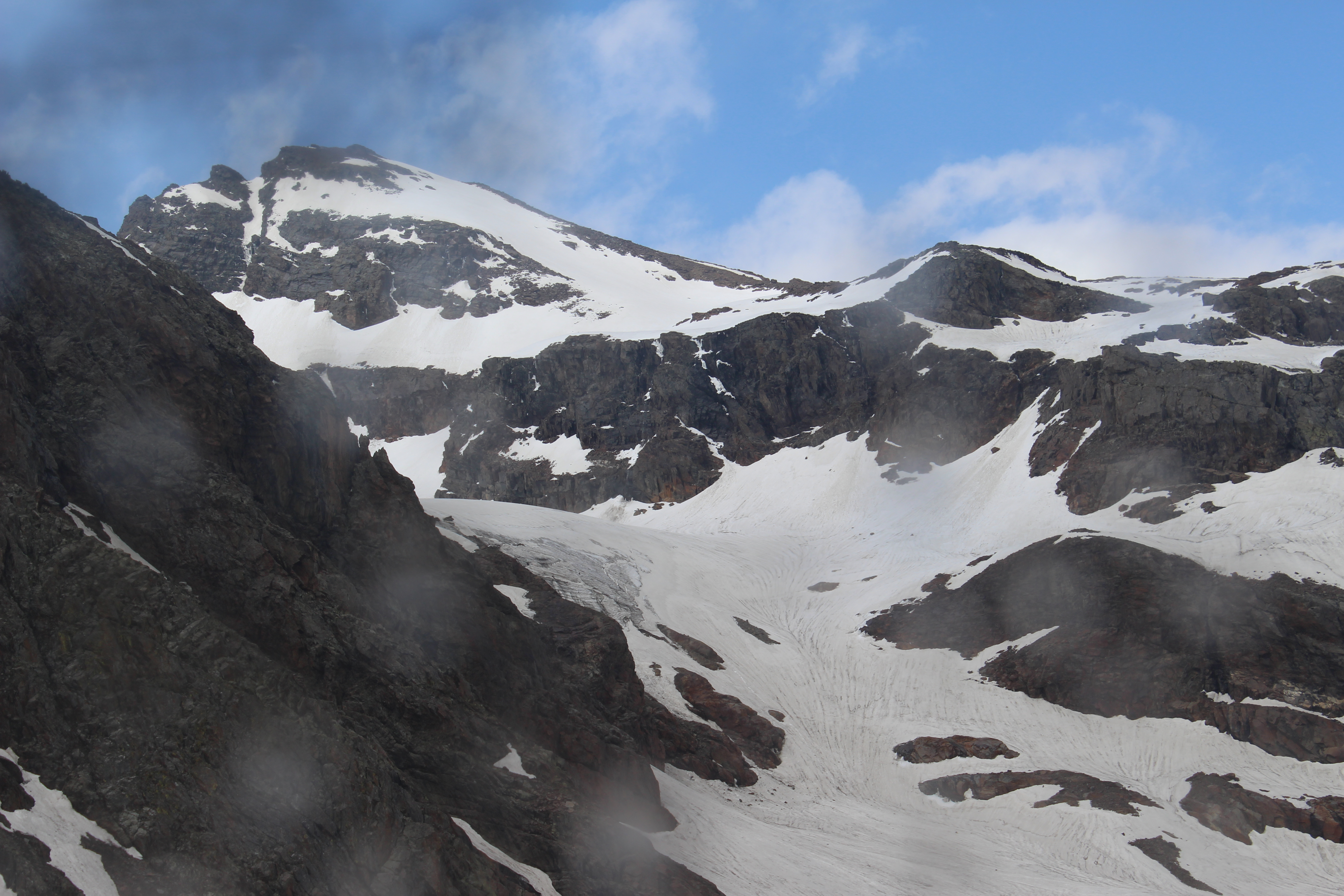
View from Saach Pass

== See also ==
- Takling La (Pass), on border of Himachal and Ladakh
- Borasu pass, on border of Himachal and Uttarakhand near Tibet border
- Rupin Pass, in Uttarakhand near the Tibet border
- Pin Parvati Pass, in Uttarakhand further south of Rupin pass
