= Regional street food =

Regional street food is street food that has commonalities within a region or culture.

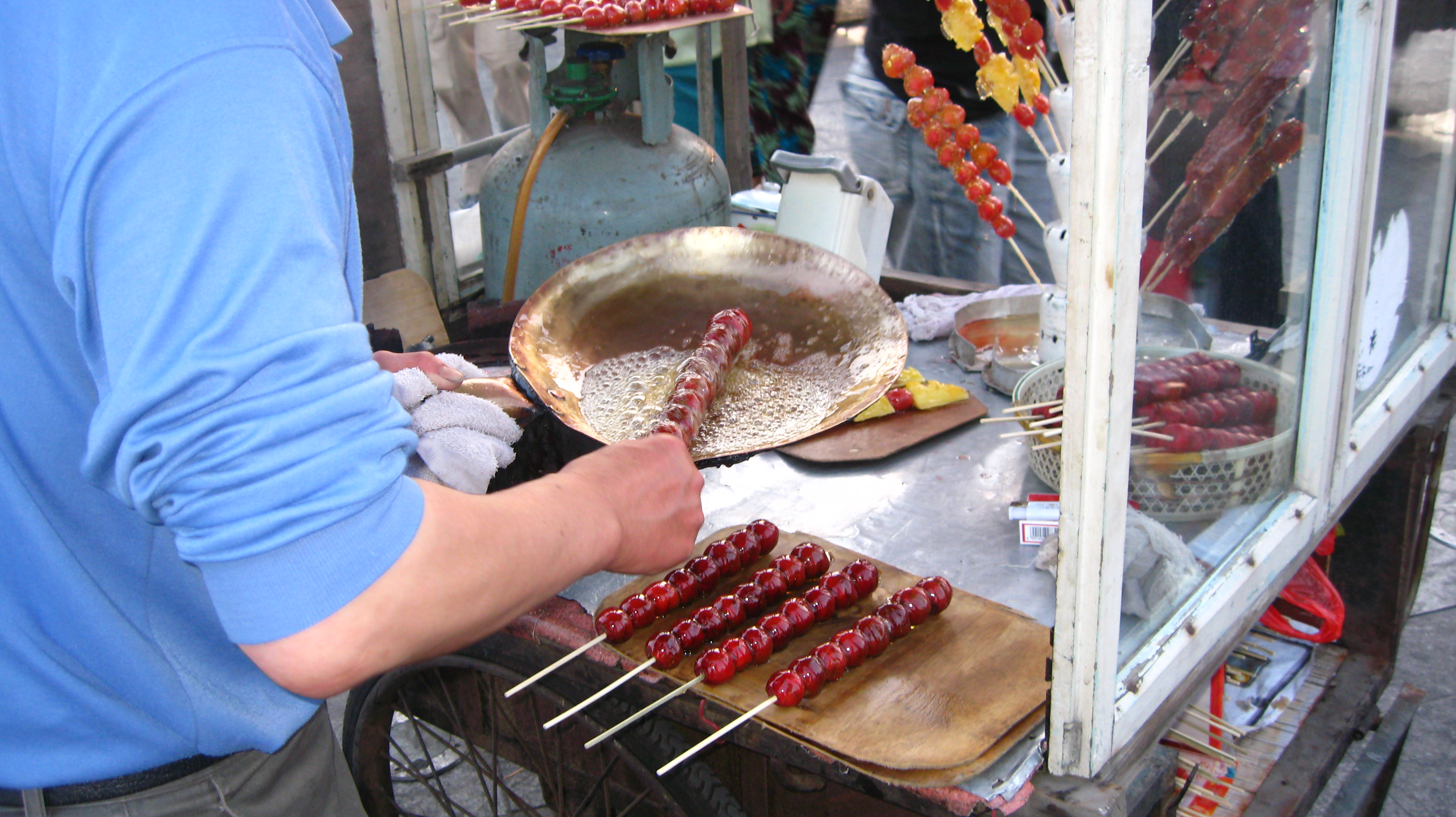
Tanghulu for sale on a street in Tianjin, China

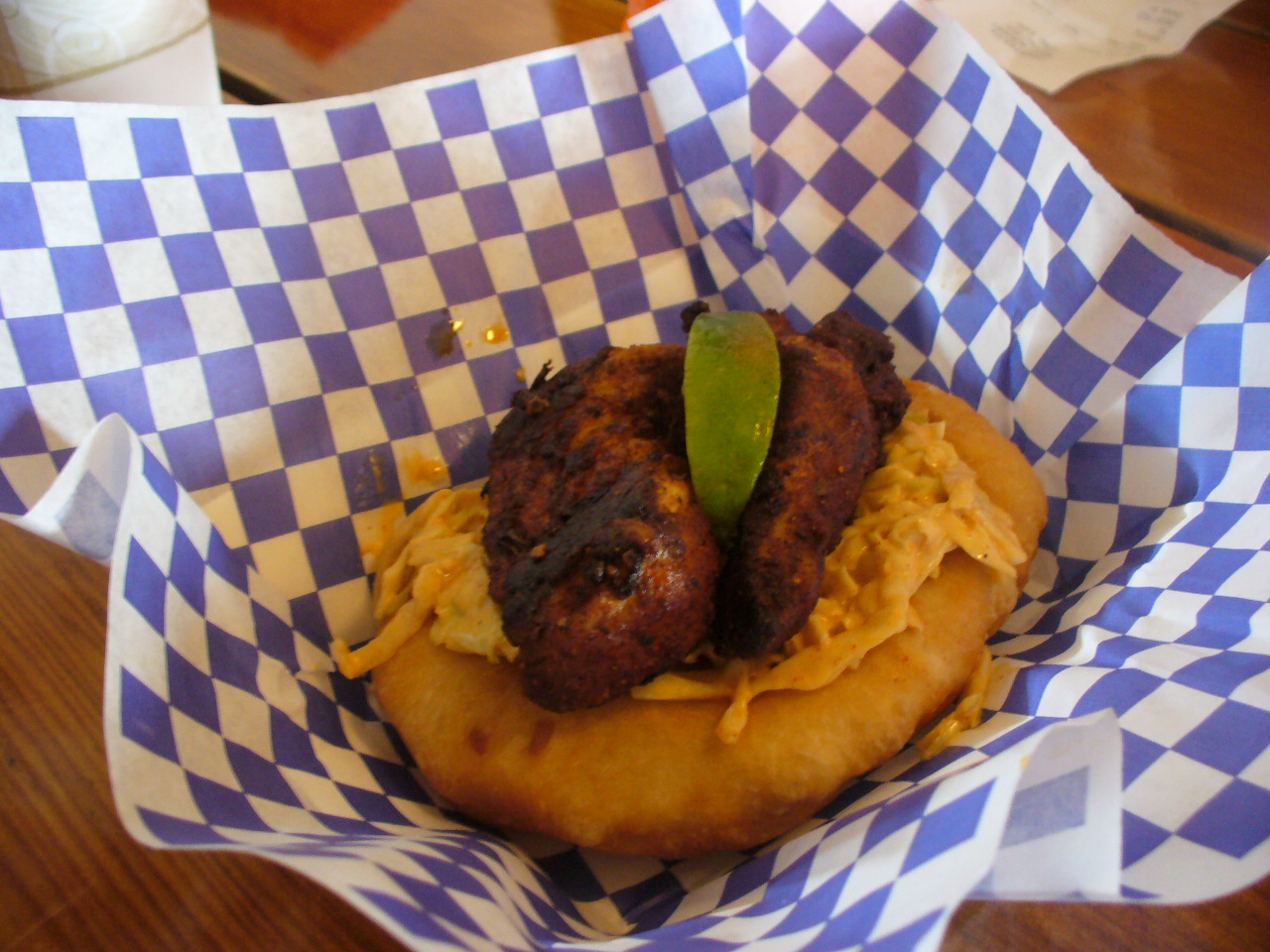
A fish taco served on fry bread in Alaska

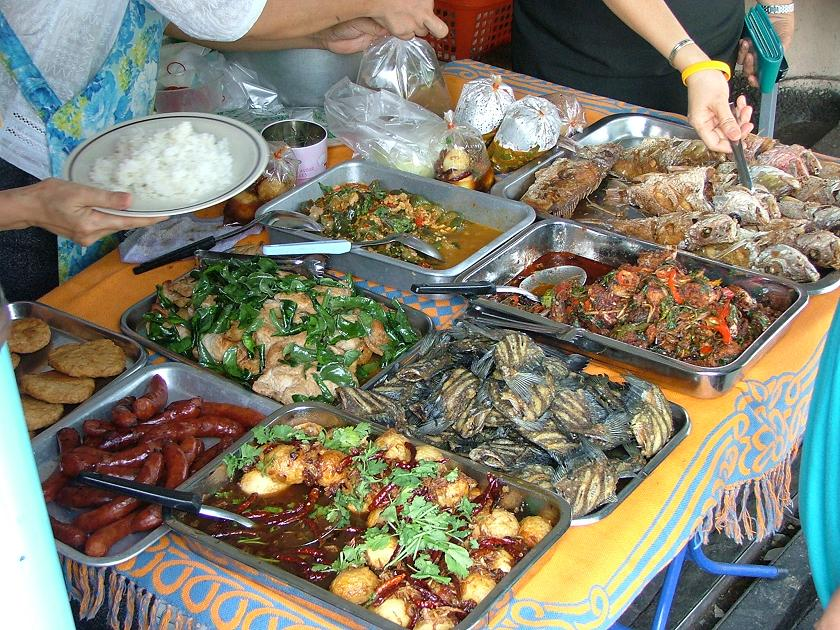
Street food packaged in plastic bags in Bangkok, Thailand

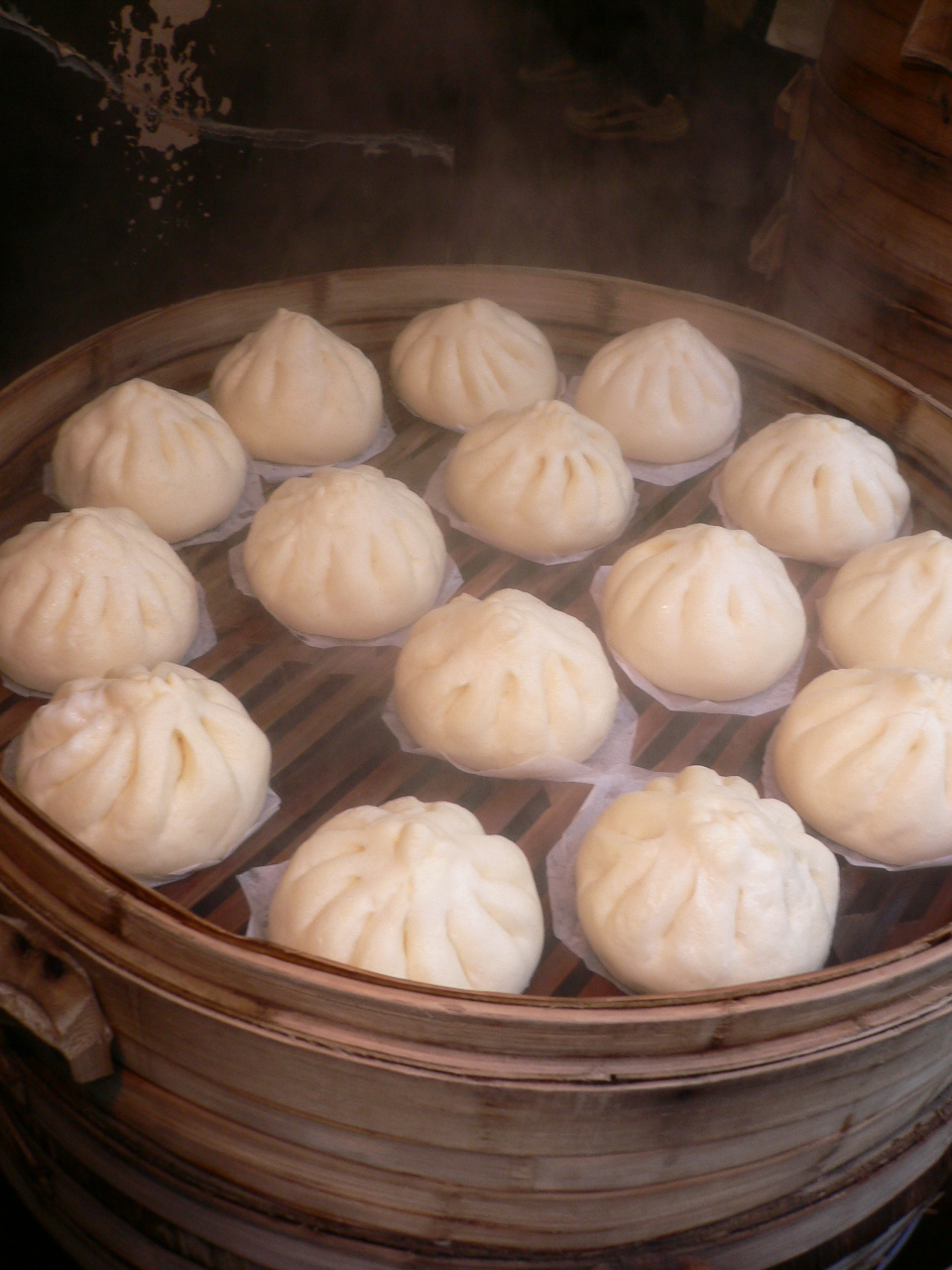
Nikuman in Japan

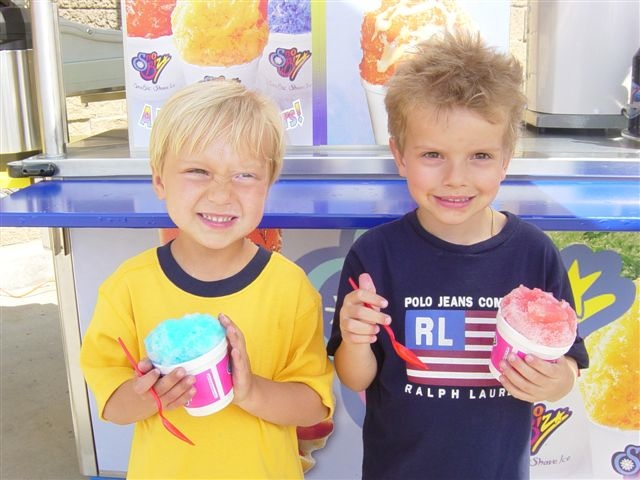
Shave ice is a traditional street food in Hawaii

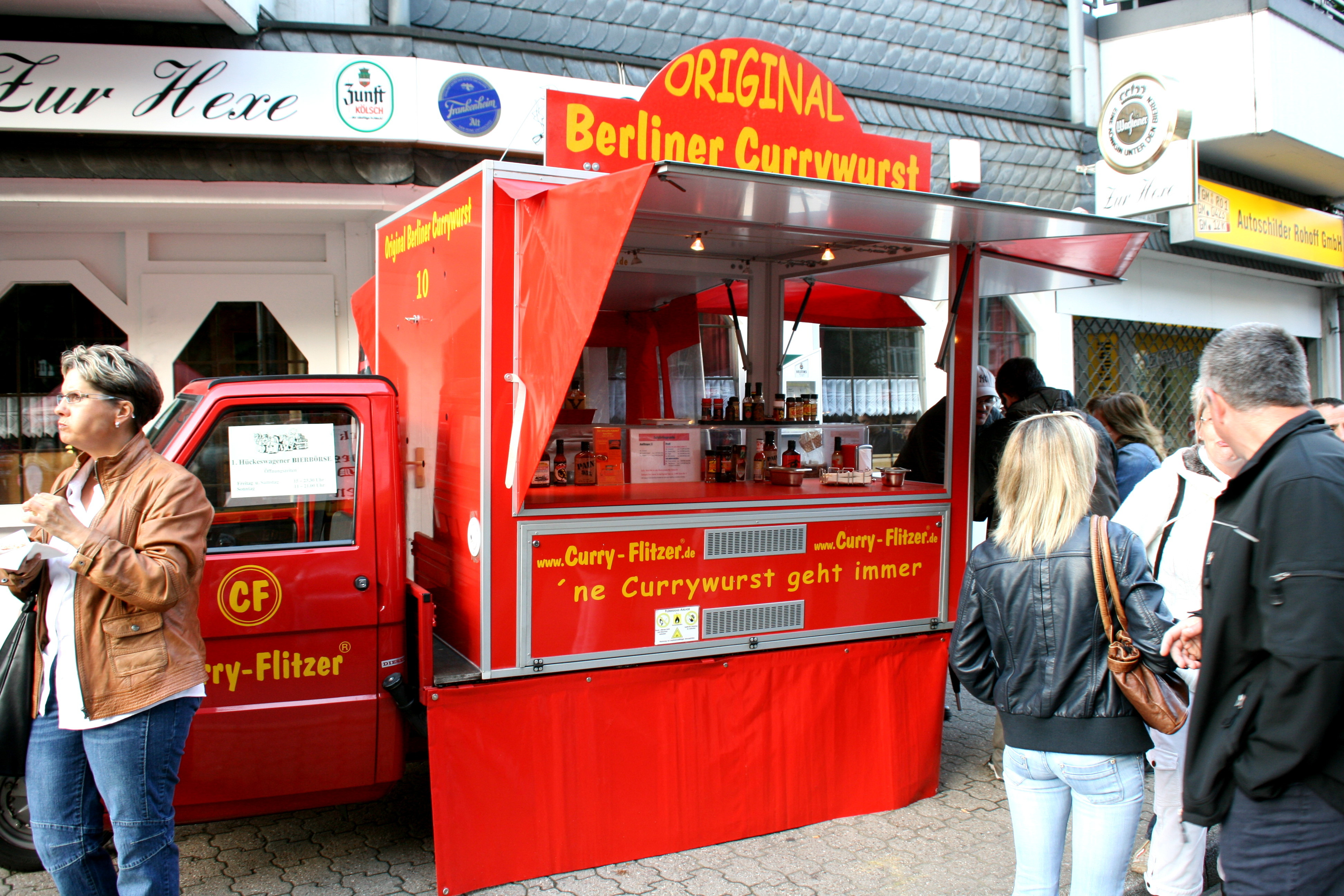
A German currywurst vendor

== Description ==
Street foods—ready-to-eat food or drink sold in a street or other public place, such as a market or fair, by a hawker or vendor, often from a portable stall— have variations within both regions and cultures. For example, Dorling Kindersley describes the street food of Vietnam as being "fresh and lighter than many of the cuisines in the area" and "draw[ing] heavily on herbs, chile peppers and lime," while street food of Thailand is "fiery" and "pungent with shrimp paste... and fish sauce" with New York City's signature street food being the hot dog, although the offerings in New York also range from "spicy Middle Eastern falafel or Jamaican jerk chicken to Belgian waffles." In Hawaii, the local street food tradition of the "plate lunch" (rice, macaroni salad and a portion of meat) was inspired by the bento of the Japanese who had been brought to Hawaii as plantation workers.

== Regional trends ==
=== Africa ===
==== Madagascar ====
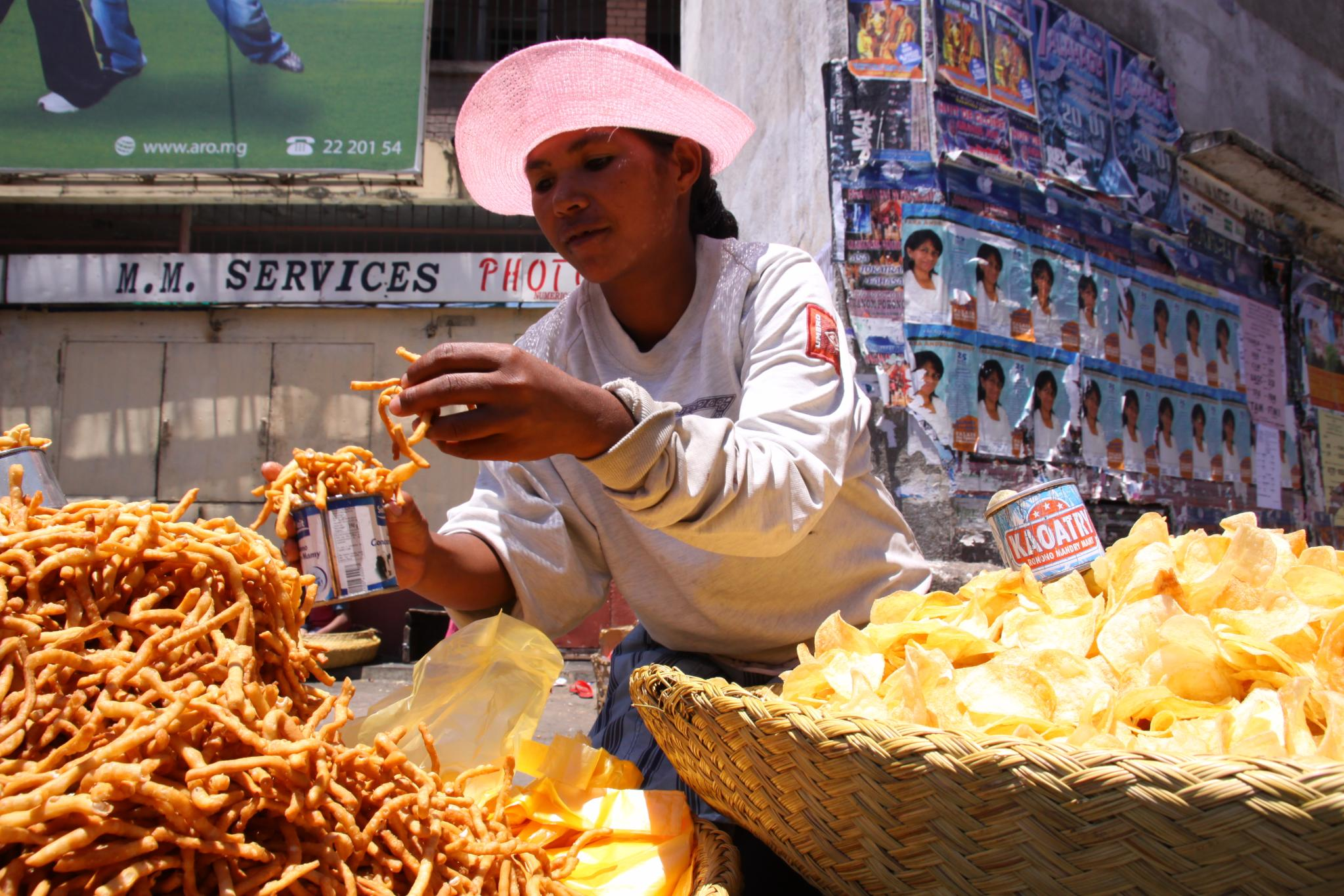
A street vendor selling fresh potato chips and kaka pizon

A variety of cakes and fritters collectively known as mofo are available from kiosks in towns and cities across Madagascar. The most common is mofo gasy, "Malagasy bread", made from a batter of sweetened rice flour poured into greased circular molds and cooked over charcoal. Mofo gasy is a breakfast food and is often eaten with coffee, also sold at kiosks. In coastal areas this mofo is made with coconut milk and is known as mokary. Other sweet mofo include a deep-fried doughnut called menakely and a fried dough ball called mofo baolina, as well as a variety of fruit fritters, with pineapple and bananas among the most common fruits used. Savory mofo include ramanonaka, a mofo gasy salted and fried in lard, and a fritter flavored with chopped greens, onions, tomatoes, and chilies called mofo sakay, "spicy bread."

In marketplaces and gas stations one may find vendors selling koba akondro, a sweet made by wrapping a batter of ground peanuts, mashed bananas, honey, and corn flour in banana leaves and steaming or boiling the small cakes until the batter has set. Peanut brittle, dried bananas, balls of tamarind paste rolled in colored sugar, deep-fried wonton-type dough strings called kaka pizon, meaning "pigeon droppings," are also eaten in neighboring Reunion Island, and home-made yogurts, are all commonly sold on the street. In rural areas, steamed cassava or sweet potatoes are eaten, occasionally with fresh or sweetened condensed milk.

==== Morocco ====
Typical street food includes bessara, crumbed liver, spicy sardines, and brochettes, Fricassé de saucisses, Boubouch (Hot spicy snail soup), Salty Chips Cornet, Jaban (Candy), Soffa (coton candy), Kefta Sandwich, Corn, Hommos Kamún, And a wide range of soups according to the region.

In the northern side of the country, Ze3za3 (a typical juice) and calenté (Or karane, calentica) are very famous.

In the cities of the Atlantic Coast (Casablanca, Safi, Essaouira, Agadir) fish and seafood are often found.

==== Nigeria ====
Chin chin is a meal served in Nigeria and west Africa. Other Nigerian street foods include suya (barbecued meat), boli (roasted plantain), fried yam and fish, roasted corn, and akara and moi-Moi (fried or steamed bean cakes, respectively). Pure water or sachet water is also sold, frequently by children.

==== South Africa ====
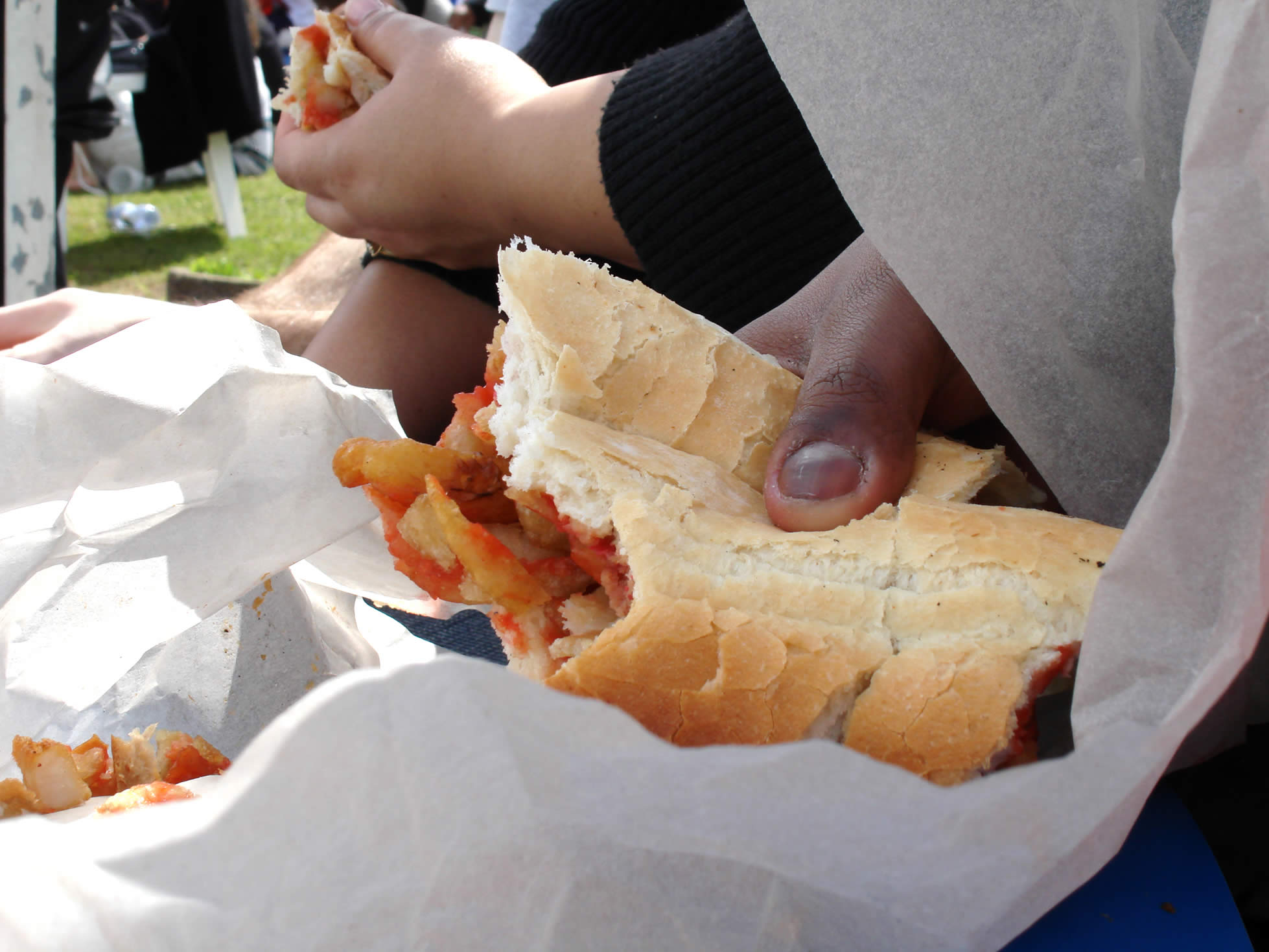
A Gatsby sandwich

In South Africa, boerewors and other braai foods are available in the street. In townships, ethnic foods are available.

In Cape Town, the Gatsby, a baguette filled with meat (often bologna sausage), salad, cheese, and chips is sold as street food. It is said to have originated from a single restaurant.

Bunny chow is a scooped out loaf with Curry or atchar inside and with the scooped out bread placed on top.

==== Uganda ====
In Uganda, a popular street food item is the rolex, where chapati, a tortilla-like flatbread, is wrapped around eggs and a selection of vegetables.

=== Asia ===
==== Bangladesh ====
Dhaka street food vendors sell pitha, chotpoti, puchka, jhalmuri, badam, and various fried items. There are also other unique street foods at the Dhaka new market such as burnt corn on the cob covered in a special sauce, and egg burgers. Some of the most popular street foods in Bangladesh are full chickens that are marinated in over 40 spices then fried in oil, egg sandwiches that are full of eggs and then battered and fried, and rasmalai, labang, and patishapta which look like crepes.

==== China ====
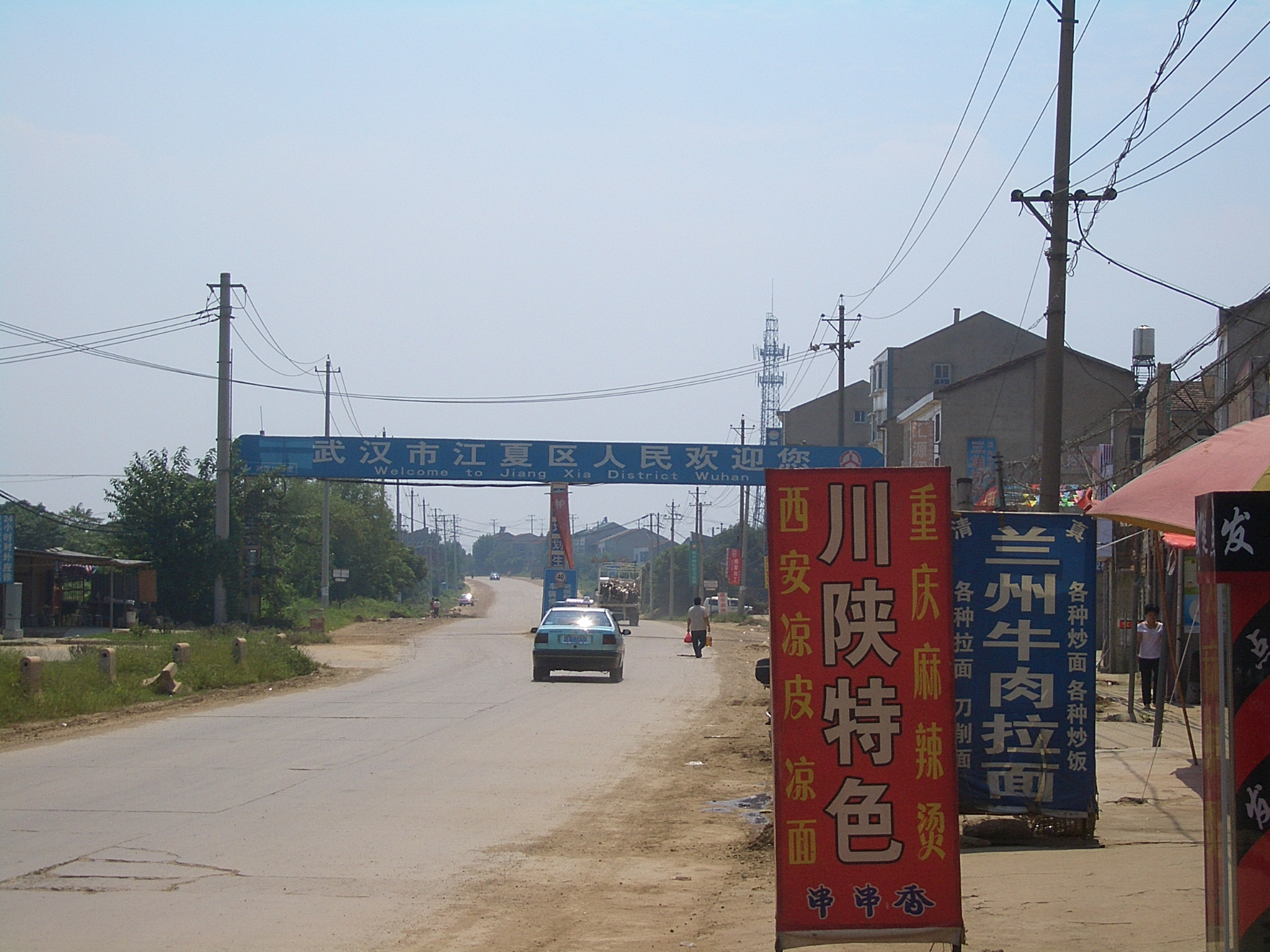
Signs by the country road near Wuhan, Hubei, announce dishes from three other provinces – Lanzhou (Gansu) halal beef noodles, Chongqing (Sichuan) mala bunch, and Xi'an (Shaanxi) cold noodles

Street vendors of snack foods (xiaochi) are becoming less common as local governments cut down on the practice, citing safety and traffic congestion as problems. Many vendors have also moved towards opening small restaurants and shops, and "street food" is now commonly eaten indoors at established locations.

Bing, a flatbread made of flour and fried in oil, was once a Northeastern street food that can also be found in many areas around the country. They can be served plain or stuffed with meat or eggs, or seasoned with scallions, sauces, or other flavours. One variety originating in Shandong and now found throughout China, jianbing guozi (煎饼果子), is made with the batter poured directly onto an iron skillet and evened out into a thin pancake. An egg is cracked on top, then various seasonings are added. It is rolled for portability.

==== South Korea ====
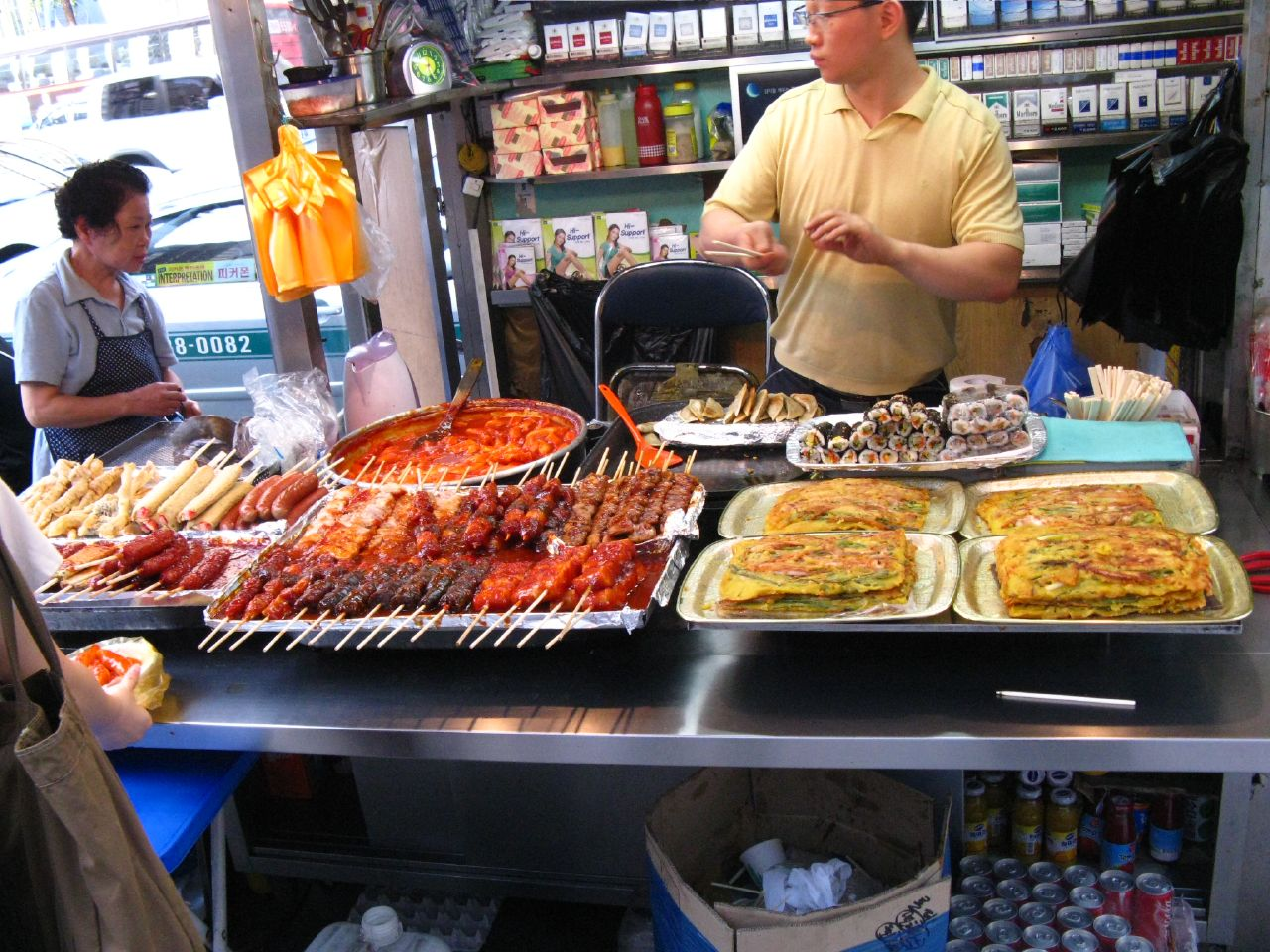
Korean Street Food

In the culture of South Korea, popular street food consists of spicy rice cakes (Tteokbokki), fish cakes, live octopus, mung bean pancake (Bindaetteok), blood sausage, Korean roll (Kimbap), and many more. The spicy rice cakes are a stable, traditional food. They are made with a spicy sauce and chewy rice cakes; many vendors add fish cakes and scallion in the soup. Street vendors reside within the residential areas and near schools. The ready-to-go food attracts business at each street corner.

==== North Korea ====
Street food vendors in North Korea are illegal, and they are named as the "grasshopper market" due to their speed to move around. The ones that are legal must pay a fee to the state to sell their products. The majority of street foods are low in nutrients. These include man-made meat (injogogibab), textured vegetable protein (injogogi), dried sausage, tofu rice, and bread snacks. They are often sold in a package form. For those who could not afford rice, corn is used to replace it in the recipes.

==== Hong Kong ====
In Hong Kong notable foods include skewered beef, curry fish balls, stuffed peppers and mushrooms, and dim sum. Street side food vendors are called gaai bin dong (Chinese: 街邊檔; lit. 'street side stalls'). Street food in Hong Kong can grow into a substantial business with the stalls only barely "mobile" in the traditional street food sense (see dai pai dong).

==== India ====
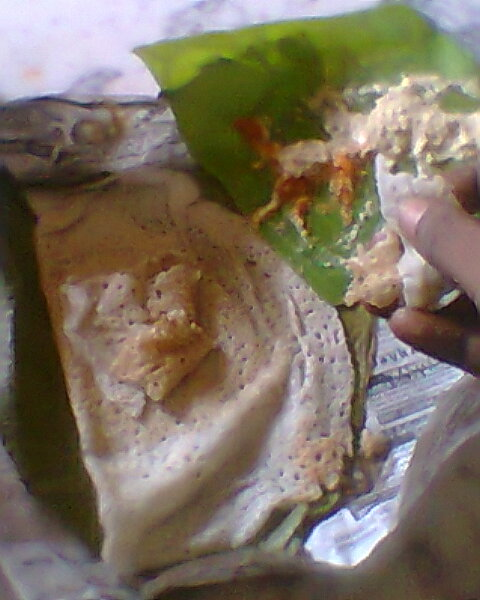
Dosa in Ongole, Andhra Pradesh

Each region of India has street food specialties.

In the areas of Maharashtra, such as Mumbai, street food culture includes vada paav, panipuri, Kheema pav, kacchi daabeli, sevpuri, dahipuri, pav bhaji, egg bhurji, chanachur, buddhi ke baal, and gola. Mumbai, Maharashtra, is where vada pav originated. In Punjab, golgappe, kulcha, chole bhature, naan, and lachhey are common.

New Delhi's cuisine is highly influenced by its neighbours Uttar Pradesh, Haryana, and Punjab, as well as Mughalai cuisine. Vegetarian dishes include sabzi kachauri (sabzi is usually spicy potato curry; kachauri can be plain as well as stuffed), dahi bhalla, and various other varieties of chaat. Certain parts of Old Delhi which include Chandani Chowk and Chawri Bazar have numerous street food vendors who have been selling street food for three or more generations.

==== Indonesia ====
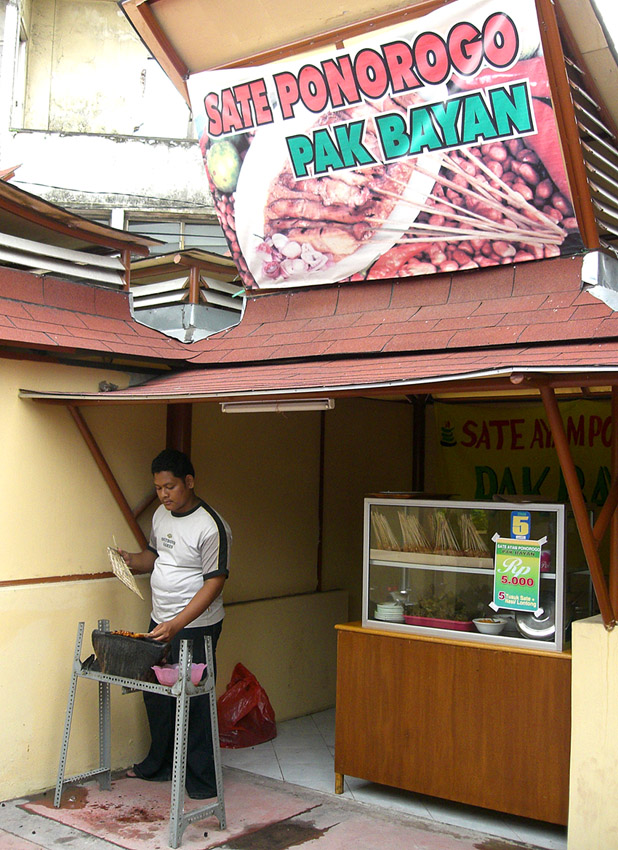
Satay stall in Indonesia

Street foods are sold by hawkers peddling their goods on carts, bicycles, motorbikes, by five foot way (kaki lima) trader, or by road-side stalls with easy access from the street. The food being sold may include Indonesian food like nasi campur, nasi goreng, gado-gado, soups (such as soto ayam), satay, desserts and beverages like bubur kacang hijau, es cendol, and es cincau.

In most cities, it is common to see Chinese dishes such as bakpao (steamed buns with sweet and savoury fillings), bakmie (noodles), and bakso (meatballs) sold by street vendors and restaurants, often adapted to become Indonesian-Chinese cuisine. One common adaptation is that pork is rarely used since the majority of Indonesians are Muslims.

==== Japan ====
The most popular and well-known street food in Japan is takoyaki, consisting of fried batter filled with octopus, onions, ginger, and tempura pieces. Traditionally, it is cooked in an iron pan with round holes to create the shape of a takoyaki and it comes in a shape of a ball with fish shaving and sauce. This dish originated from Osaka. The custom of street food is not to eat in the streets because of tradition. It is more acceptable to eat sitting under a roof, at home, or designated eating area.

==== Nepal ====
Nepalese street foods mainly includes momo (dumpling), cephali, fried potato, fish, chicken drumstick (poultry), alu-paratha (chapati with boiled and crushed potato inside), pakoda, sausage, panipuri, chatpate, different types of chat, paan, and various other Nepali dishes.

==== Pakistan ====
Some of the common items in Pakistan include bun kabab sandwiches, samosas, kulfi ice cream, popcorn, fried or grilled fish, sugar cane juice, chickpea juice (sutthu), lemonade (limno paani), sliced coconut, dried fruits and nuts (almonds, peanuts, walnuts, figs, pine nuts, etc.), haleem, biryani, pakoras, falsa fruit (Grewia asiatica), grilled chicken (chicken charga), french fries (often called 'finger chips'), paan, gol guppay, spiced chickpeas (chana masala) and papri chaat.

==== Philippines ====
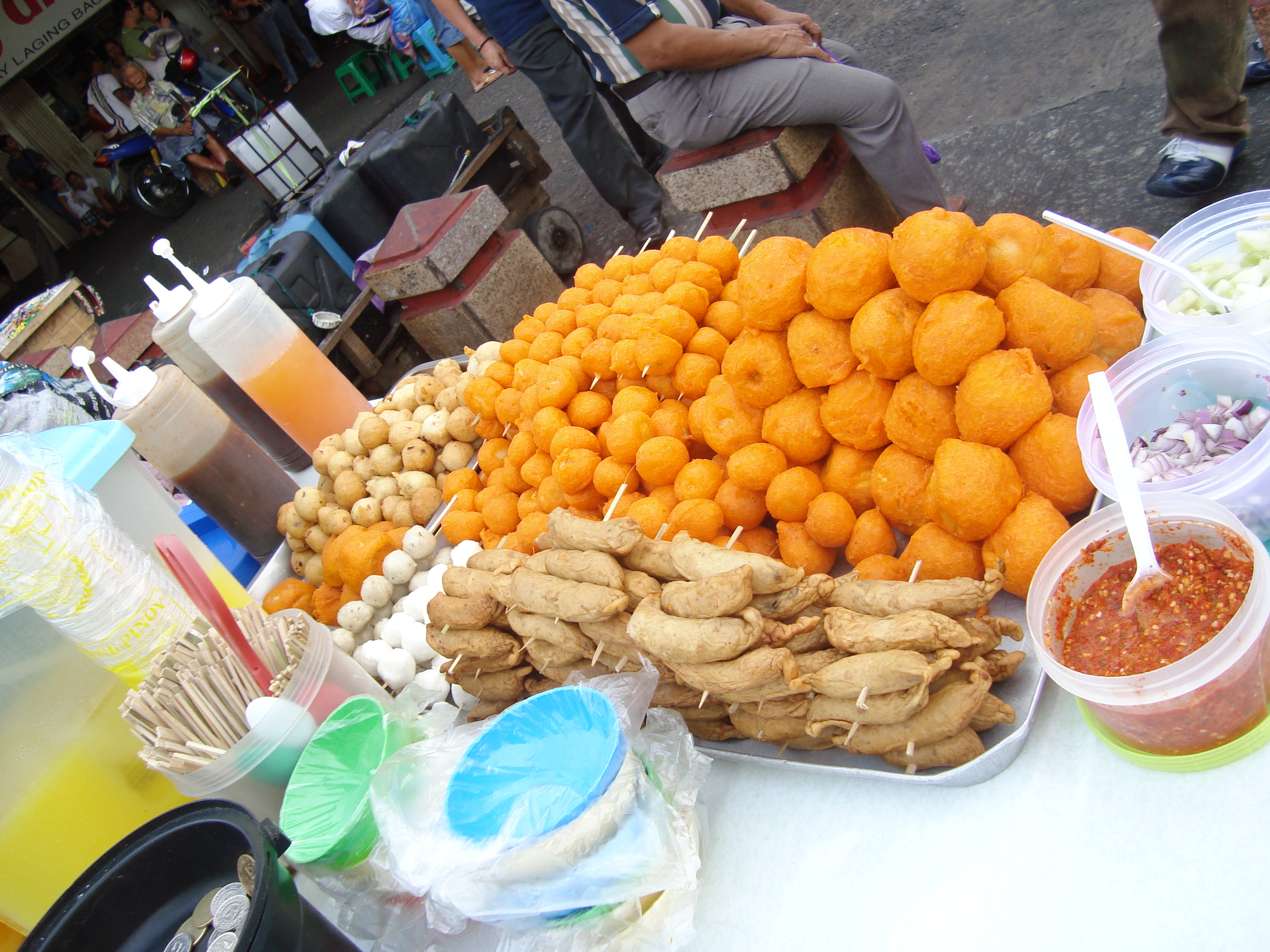
Street foods in Manila, Philippines.

The most common Philippine street foods include binatog, beef pares, Turon, Mami. Popular fried snacks are the squidball, fishball, and kikiam, a type of processed chicken and pork product similar to surimi, that are served hot with a variety of dipping sauces.

Roadside stands also serve barbecued pork, chicken, and offal, such as pig's blood or dried chicken blood (colloquially Betamax, after its rectangular shape resembling the Betamax tape), chicken heads (helmet), chicken feet (adidas), pig's ears (tenga) and chicken intestines (isaw). Among more esoteric foods are balut and penoy (duck eggs with fetus and without, respectively), tokneneng and kwek-kwek (battered, deep-fried chicken and quail eggs similar to tempura) and deep-fried day-old-chick.

==== Singapore ====
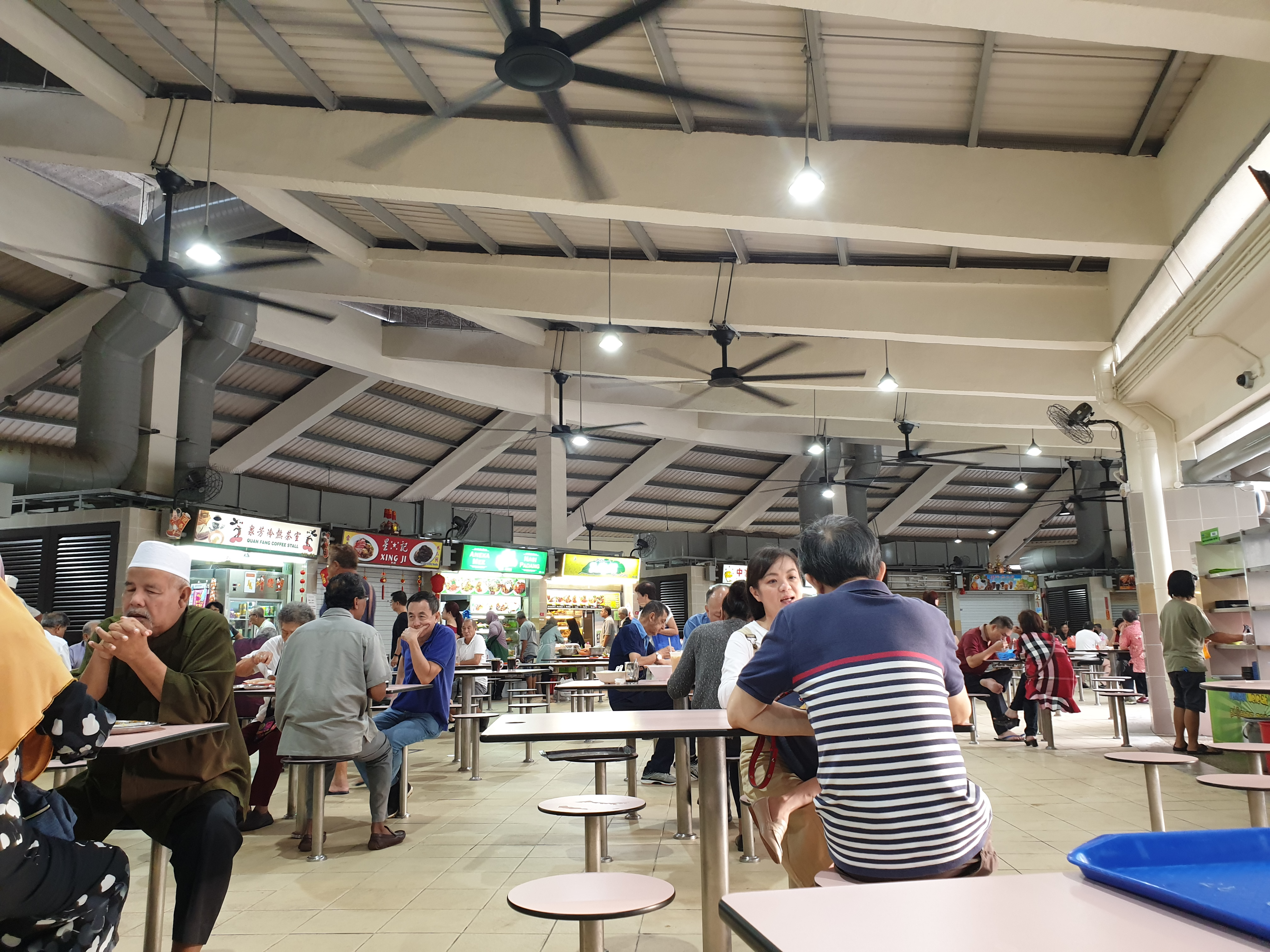
Singapore's Hawker Center

Singapore street food prepares food from various countries due to its diversity and history. The most common dishes include chicken rice (prepared with chicken broth), chili crab (spicy chili-tomato gravy), laksa (fish soup with vermicelli noodles), char kway teow (stir-fried noodles), chai tow kuay (savory cake), barbecue, and fish ball soup. There are around 78 hawker centers all over Singapore where food vendors surrounds the outside of the market. Each vendor sells their speciality dishes differentiating from each other to provide a variety of experiences.

==== Taiwan ====
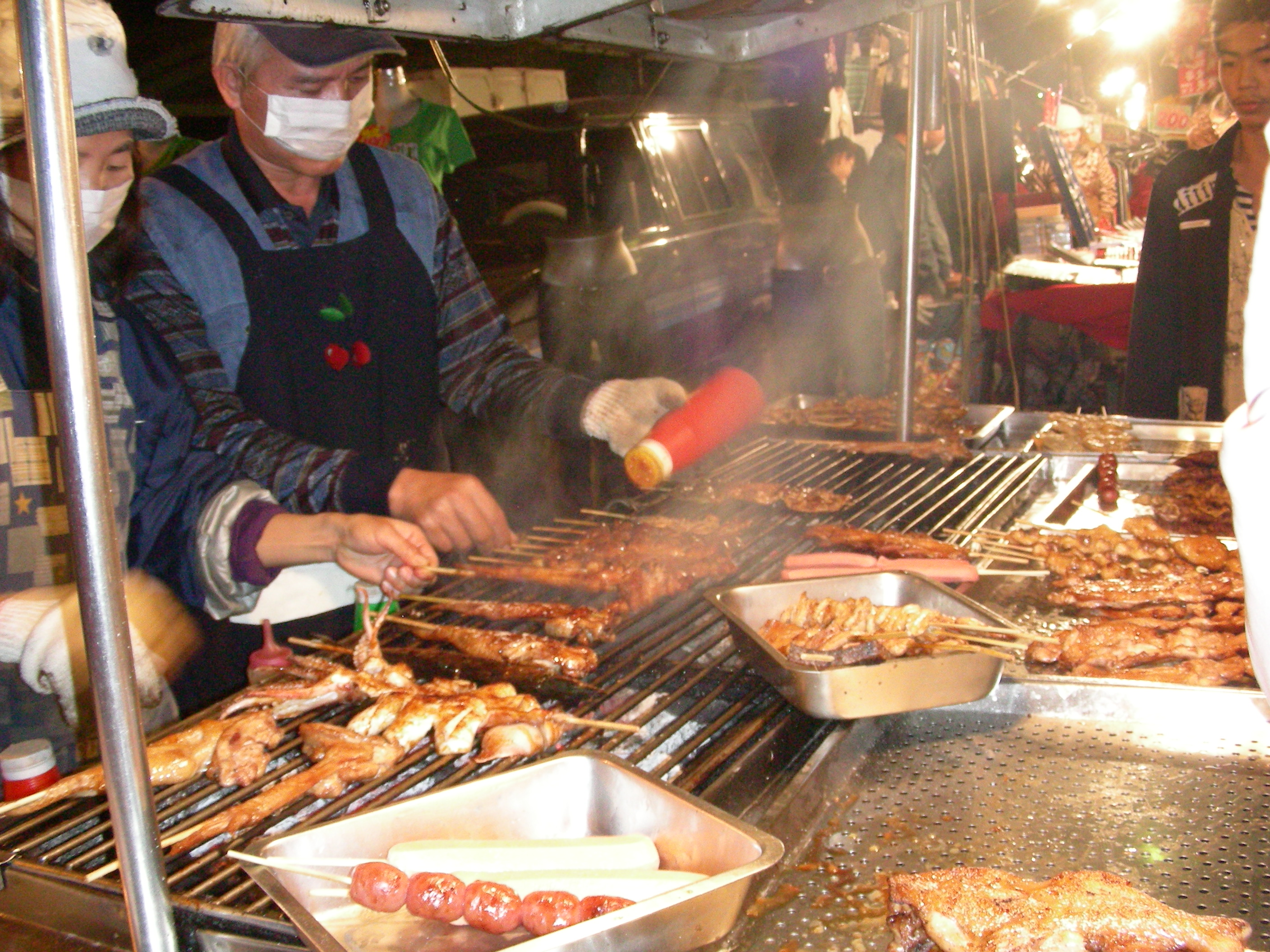
Vendors BBQ various meats at a Taiwan night market,

Taiwan's street food sold at night markets is well known in Asia, especially that from the city of Tainan. The Dadong night market in Tainan has a large unique variety of foods such as oyster omelets, corn on the cob, fried squid, fried eel noodles, fish balls and pork blood, Taiwanese hot dogs, and ice cream on a stick.

==== Thailand ====
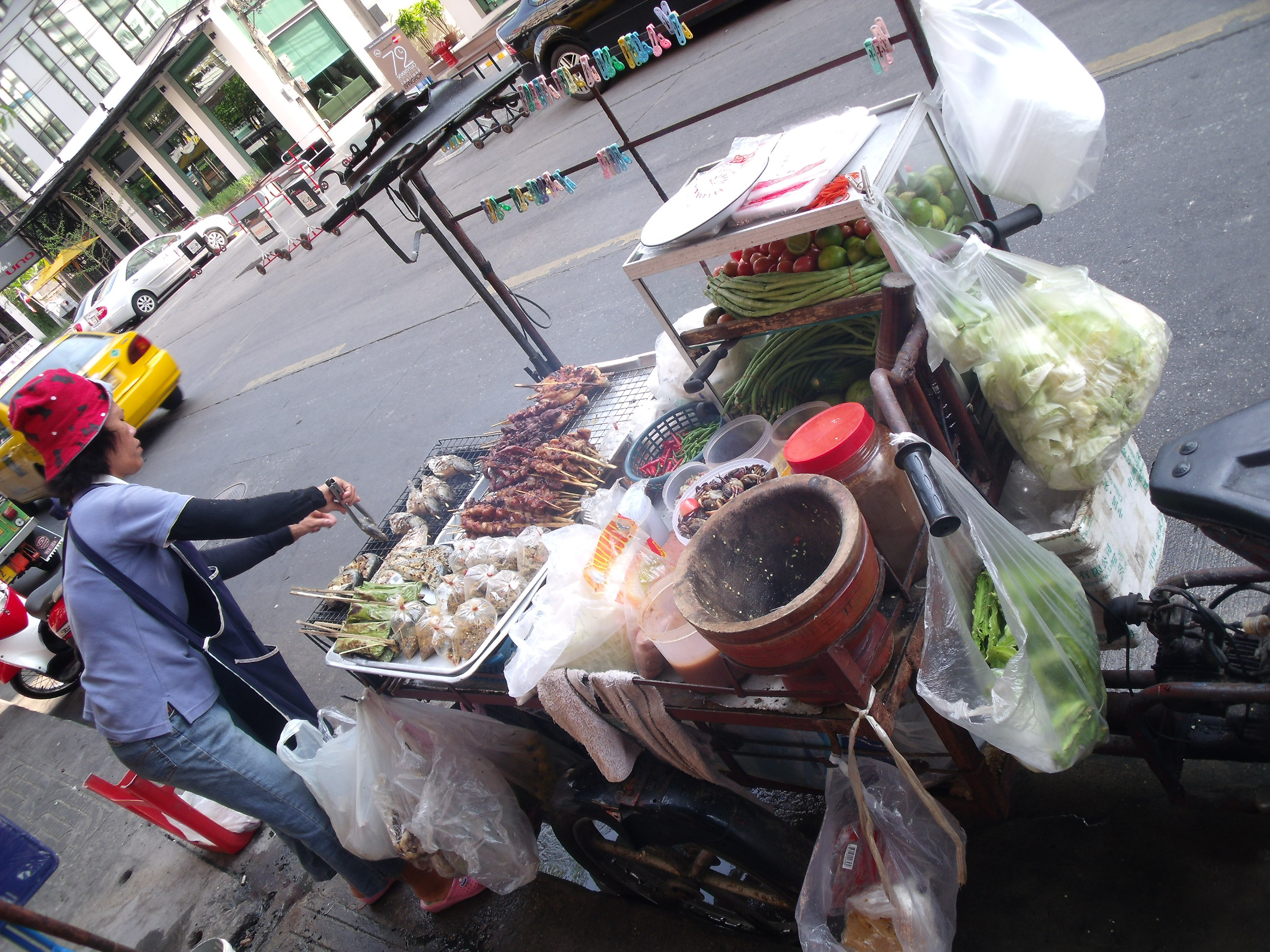
A vendor barbecuing along a Bangkok, Thailand street

Noodle dishes include pad Thai; rat na, flat noodles with beef, pork, or chicken and vegetables, topped with a light gravy; and rad naa's twin, phat si-io, the same flat noodles dry-fried (no gravy) with a dark soy sauce, vegetables, meat, and chili.

Other dishes include tom yum kung (a soup), khao phat (fried rice), various kinds of satay, and various curries. Japanese chikuwa and German sausages have also appeared in Bangkok. Canal food has been sold from boats on Thailand's rivers and canals for over two centuries, but since the early 20th century King Rama V's modernizations have caused a shift towards land-based stalls. In Bangkok parlance, a housewife who feeds her family from a street food vendor is known as a "plastic-bag housewife", which originated from streets vendors packaging the food in plastic bags.

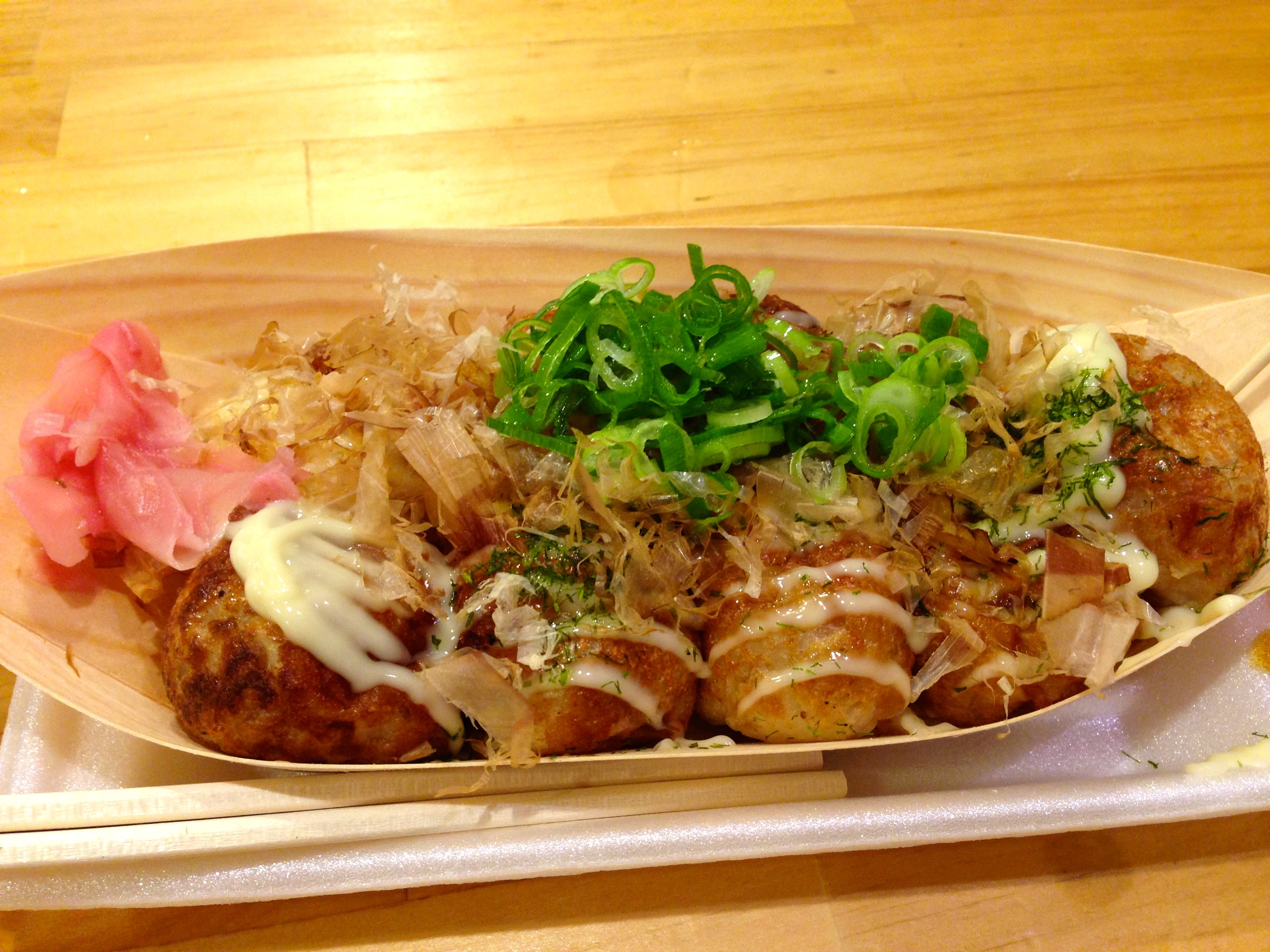
Takoyaki in Osaka

==== Vietnam ====
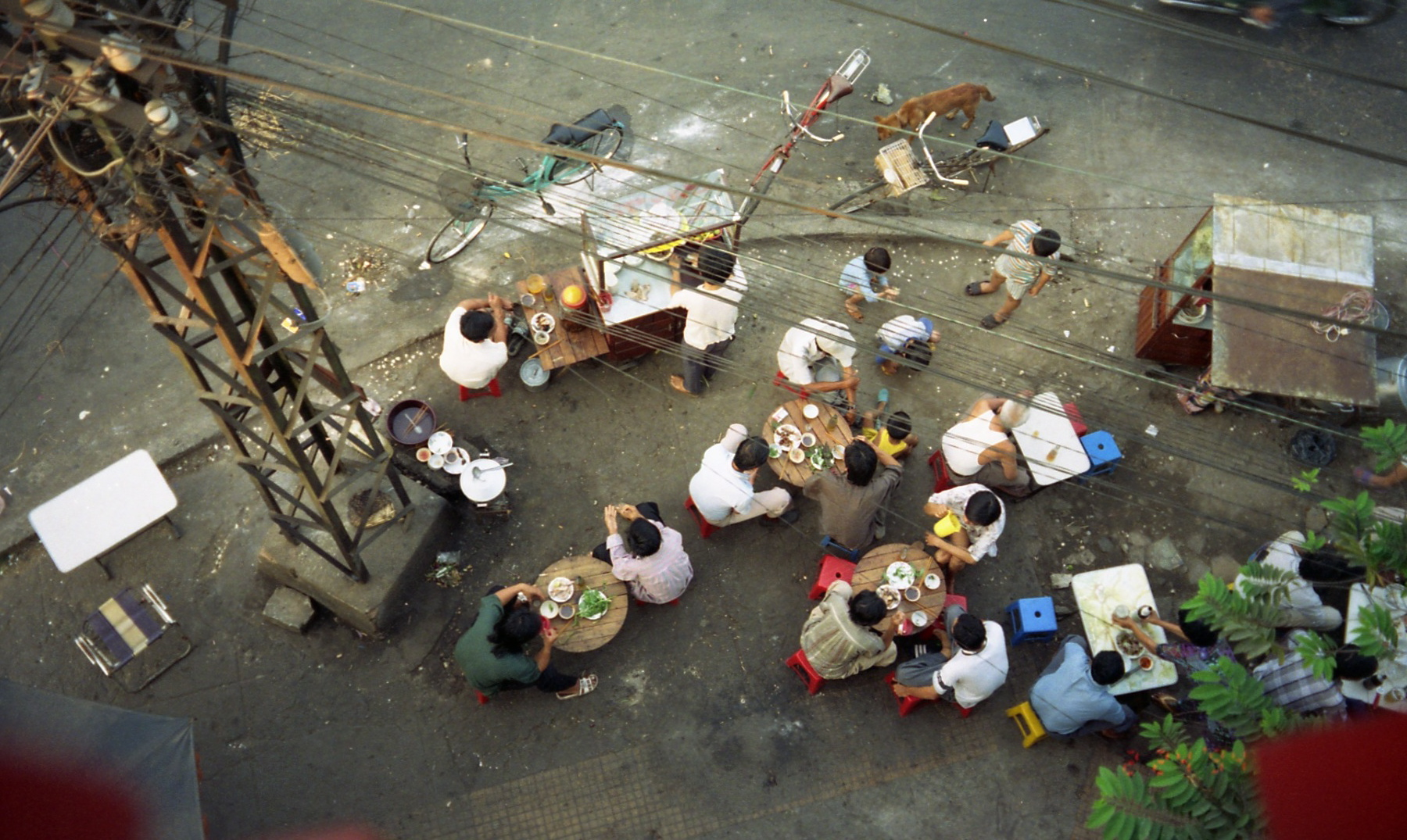
Street vendors, like these two in Ho Chi Minh City, often set out tables and plastic stools for customers.

Pho was originally sold from elaborate carrying poles. From the pole hung two wooden cabinets, one housing a cauldron over a wood fire, the other storing noodles, spices, cookware, and space to prepare a bowl of pho. Today, however, pho is usually sold at fixed stands surrounded by tables and stools.

=== Europe ===
==== Balkans ====
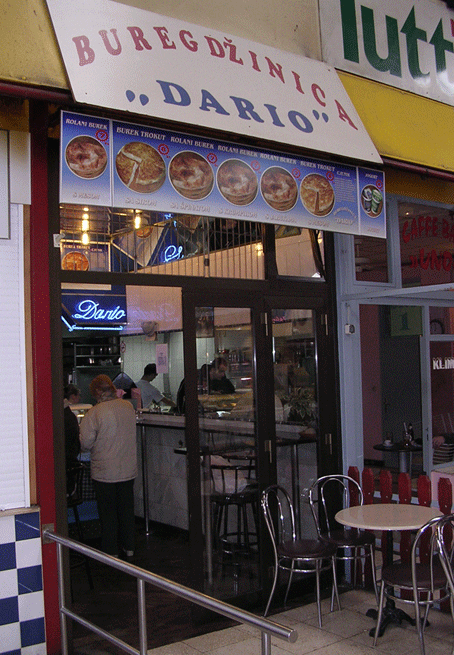
Buregdžinica in Zagreb

Street food in the Balkans is heavily influenced by the cuisine of the Ottoman Empire. Variations of the burek, a filled flaky pastry, are common throughout Turkey and the Balkans. Ćevapi is a sort of kebab served in Yugoslavia and Romania, where it is called mititei. Pljeskavica, a grilled dish of spiced meat patty mixture of pork, beef and lamb, is also very popular.

==== Benelux ====
In the Netherlands and Belgium, french fries are served with sauces such as mayonnaise, ketchup, curry, or tartar sauce (the latter mainly in Belgium). The combination of mayonnaise, ketchup or curry ketchup and chopped onions is called speciaal ("special"), and mayonnaise mixed with peanut sauce is called oorlog ("war").

==== Belgium ====
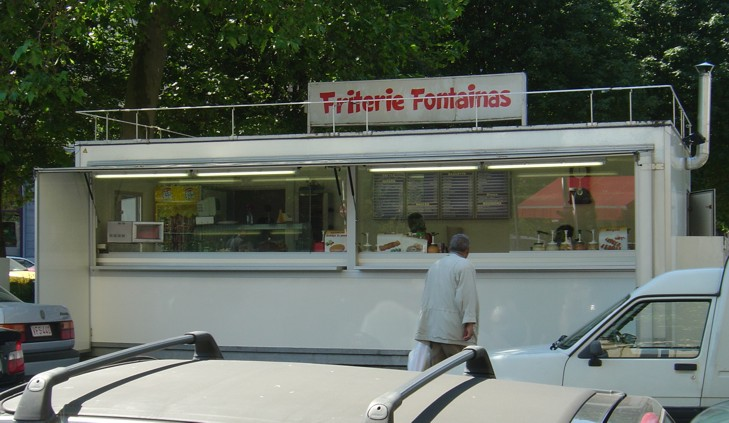
A Frituur, a French fries street vendor in Brussels.

In Belgium, a thicker variety of fries is used, frieten in Dutch and frites in French. They are mainly sold by street vendors (see picture), in a little place called a frituur in Dutch, a friterie in French. In Belgium, French fries are traditionally fried in suet (beef fat) but this has become less common and people tend to fry them in oil. Liège-style waffles (Dutch wafel or French gaufre) are served warm as a street snack, somewhat similar to what is known in other countries as "Belgian waffles" (which are called in Belgium "Gaufres de Bruxelles" or "Brusselse Wafels") but richer, denser and sweeter. The pancake is fluffier than the French crêpe or the Russian blin.

==== Czech Republic ====
The most common and traditional Czech street food is smažený sýr, which is a soft piece of cheese deep-fried and served on a hamburger bun.

==== Denmark ====
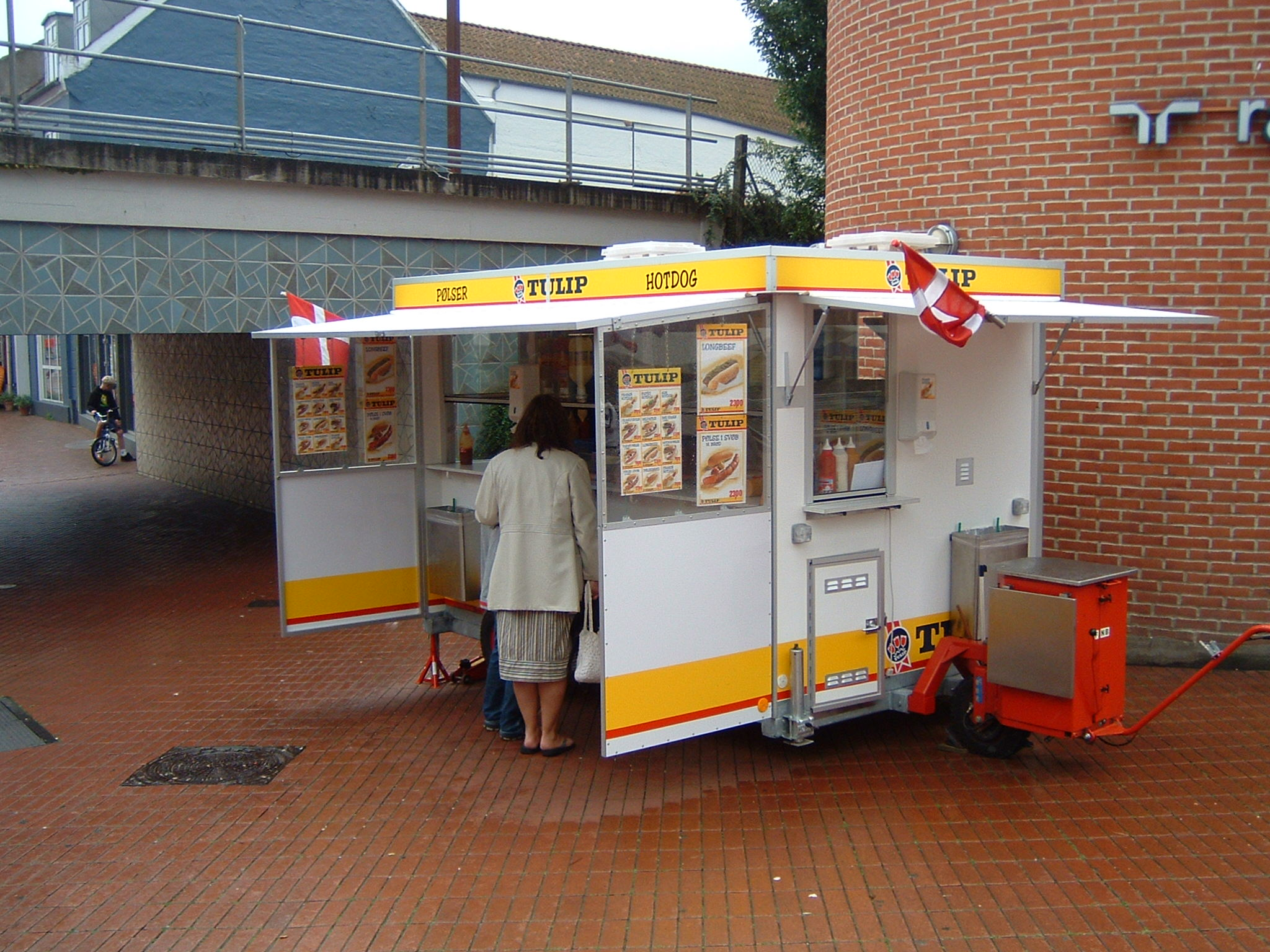
A Pølsevogn (sausage wagon) in Kolding City, Denmark.

In Denmark, one can purchase sausages and hot dogs from sausage wagons. These are technically considered hot dog stands and are one of the most popular food trucks in the country.

==== Finland ====
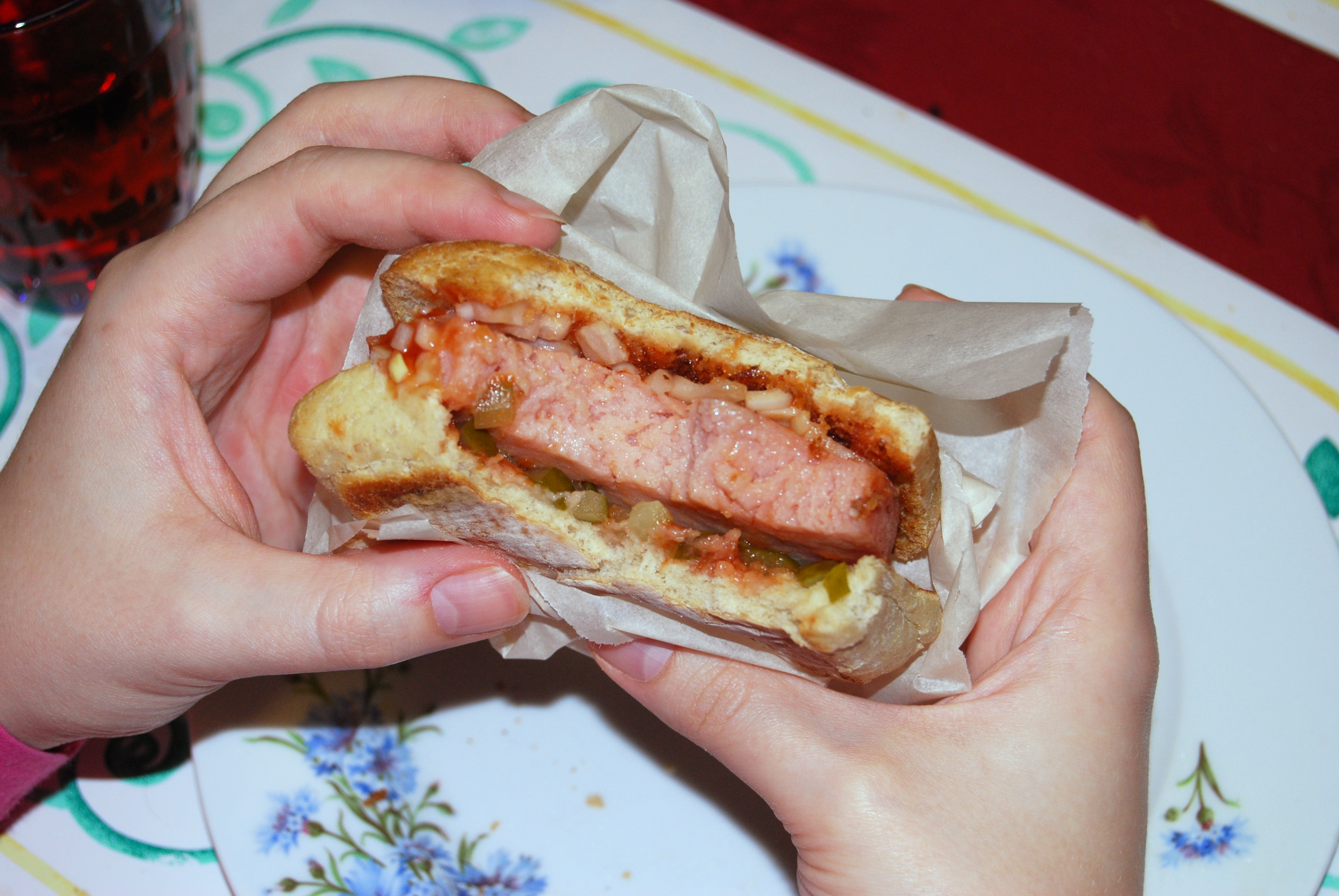
A porilainen sandwich

In Finland, street food can mostly be found at market squares and kiosks, although hamburger chains Hesburger, McDonald's, and Burger King are also available. A variety of savoury pastries such as lihapiirakka and karjalanpiirakka, and sweet pastries such as pulla, usually served with coffee, are very common. Fish stands at the market squares also serve gravlax on rye bread as an open sandwich or loimulohi. Regional specialties sold at the market squares include sultsina and kalakukko.

In addition to hamburgers and hot dogs, Finnish meat pastries with sausages are available at kiosks, especially a sausage sandwich called a porilainen. Condiments include ketchup, Finnish mustard, pickle relish, mayonnaise, and mustard relish, as well as lettuce, tomato, and onion. Other common late night street food fare found at kiosks are doner kebabs, Finnish meatballs (lihapulla), and french fries with sausage and condiments (makkaraperunat).

==== France ====
In France, sandwiches are a common street food. Most of them are baguette bread sandwiches with different kinds of fillings such as "jambon/beurre" (ham with butter), "jambon/fromage" (ham with cheese) or "poulet/crudités" (chicken with vegetables). A typical sandwich from Prouvènço - Païs Nissart is the pan bagnat (round bread with vegetables, boiled egg, tuna fish and anchovies). From this area, there are also frita (crispy feuilleté filled with a red pepper paste), pissaladière (onions and anchovies tart), fougasse (some kind of bread filled with olives or cheese, sometimes meat and vegetables). From Bretagne (Rennes) there is la galette saucisse and le far Breton. In Corsica, you can find fiadone, ambrucciata, beignets fourrés à la courge, bastelle, fritelle, i frappi. In Lyon, la brioche à la praline In Elsass, bretzels, moricettes, flammeküeche.. in the North frites fricadelles In Sète (Languedoc), la tielle siétoise Roulés à la saucisse, friand au fromage can we find in every bakery in France also with desserts : mille-feuilles, éclairs, paris-brest, tartelette au citron meringuée, tartelette aux fraises..

Crêpes are another common French street food. A crêpe complète containing ham, shredded cheese, and an egg provides a filling lunch. Sweet crêpes or waffles are sold with Nutella and banana or Grand Marnier and sugar.

Other street foods include pizza, kebab-type sandwiches and panino, a grilled and pressed sandwich.

During the winter, roasted chestnuts can be bought.

==== Germany ====
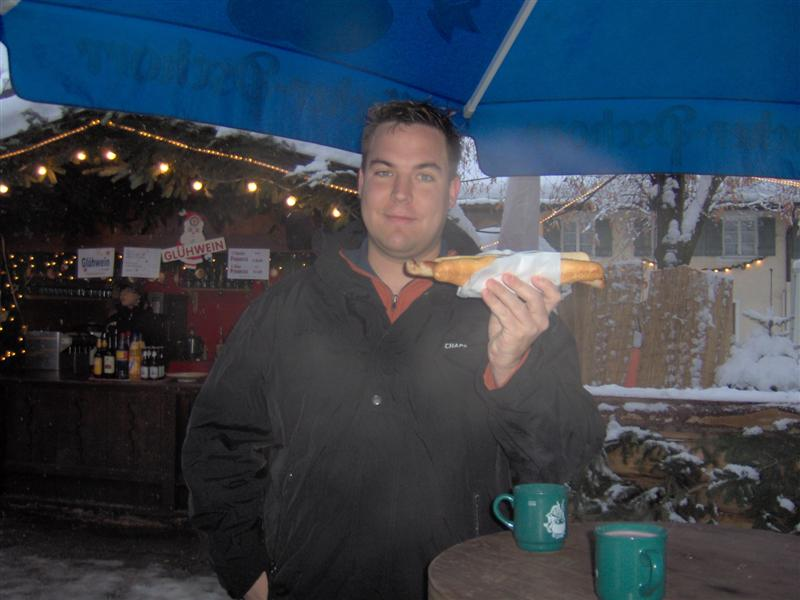
Bratwurst and Glühwein in Garmisch

Bavarian Fleischkäse (also called Leberkäse), is similar to meatloaf, sliced to the thickness of a finger and generally served with either hot mustard or sweet mustard in a roll. Germany is also known for its various types of sausage, as well as the recent hybrid curry-sausage, currywurst. French fries (pommes in German, derived from French but pronounced according to German orthographic rules) are popular, served with ketchup and/or mayonnaise, and sometimes with sausage. In northern Germany rolls with pickled or smoked fish (e.g. matjes) are also a common snack, occasionally sold out of mobile smoke houses. Beer is sold at all sidewalk snack stands, which usually feature beers and small bottles of whiskey, schnapps, or vodka.

Turkish-influenced street foods include shawarma and Döner. North African stalls sell shawarma, falafel and halumi.

==== Hungary ====
Street food is not particularly common in Hungary, although gyros shops are becoming more common. Rétes (strudel) is fairly common, and lángos (a deep fried bread) is usually available at markets and during celebrations. In general, Hungarians looking for quick food will stop to sit down and eat, even if only at a Chinese buffet or a főzelékfaló (vegetable purée bar).

==== Italy ====
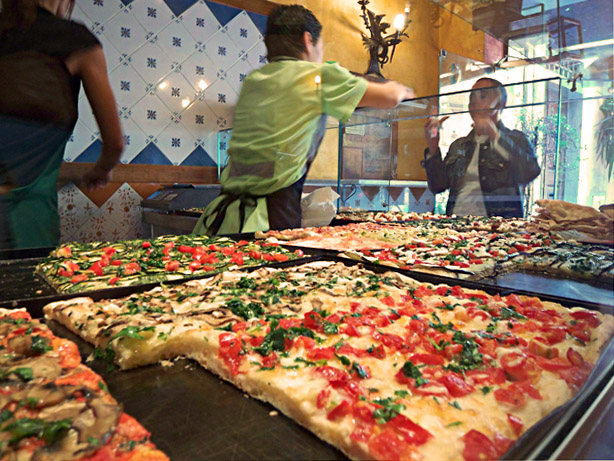
Pizza al taglio shop in Rome

The most notable Italian street food is pizza, sold in take-aways and bakeries. Take-away pizza (or pizza al taglio) is quite different from pizzeria pizza. Unlike the round pizza normally found in restaurants, which originated in Naples as a street food itself, it is generally baked on large square trays, and square or rectangular portions are sold. It usually has quite a thick base, again unlike the traditional Italian restaurant pizza.

Toppings include margherita, mushrooms, Italian sausage, ham, and vegetables.

Other street foods are the Genoese focaccia di recco (a double layer of thin dough filled with quark cheese and baked); farinata (a thin, baked chickpea-flour batter, topped with salt, pepper and olive oil), which is often served with focaccia (a thin bread, also with salt and olive oil); Florentine trippa and lampredotto (ox stomach cooked in a seasoned broth and served in a bread roll); and Roman supplì; (rice balls filled with cheese and/or various fillings, covered in egg and breadcrumbs and deep fried), which is similar to Sicilian arancini, where the usual filling is a meat sauce with green peas.

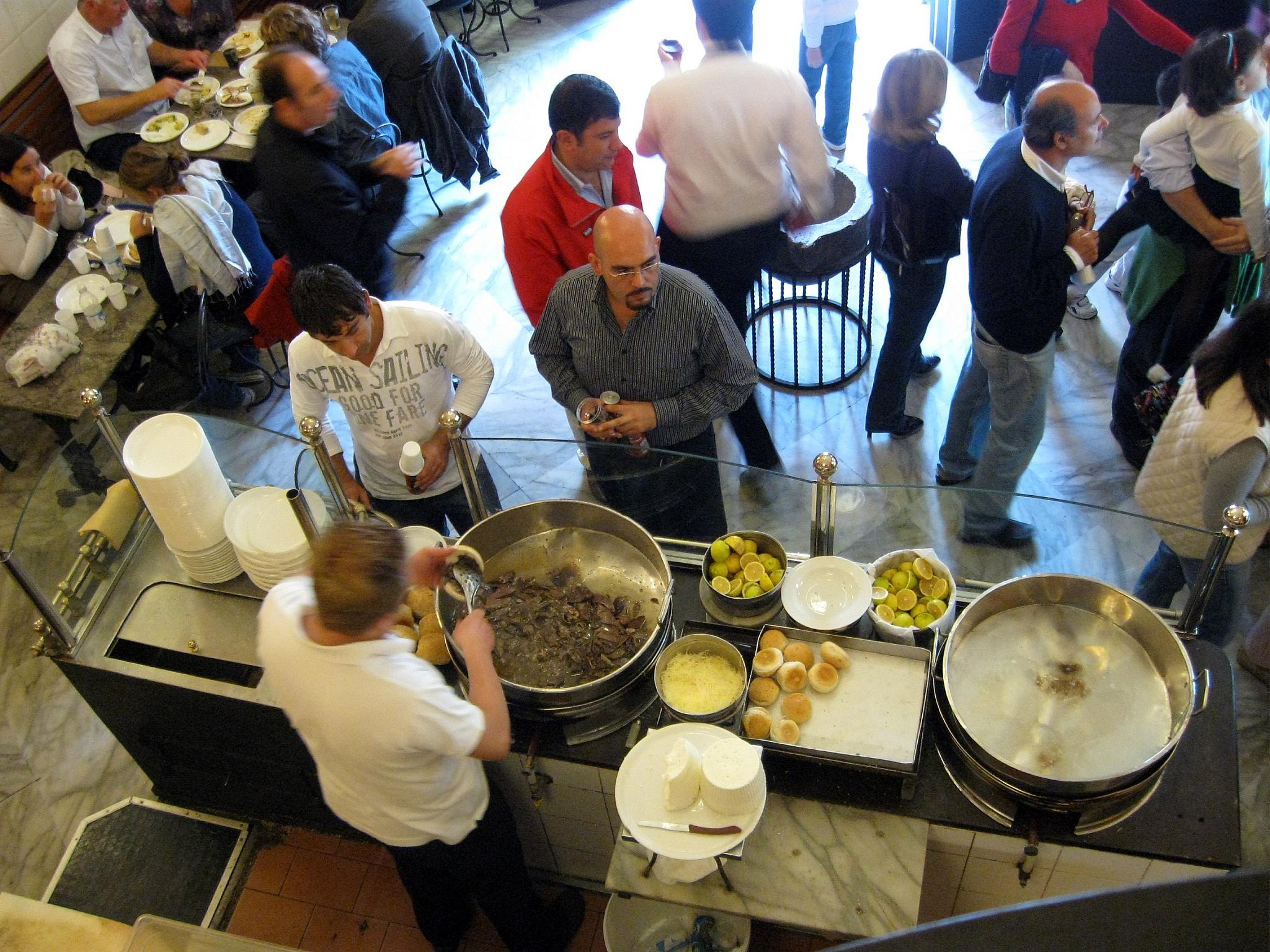
Pani ca meusa served in a rotisserie in Palermo

In Palermo, a street food would be Pani ca meusa (bread rolls with sliced, cooked pork spleen), and "panelle", deep-fried chickpea flour batter. In central Italy porchetta is common, which is a spicy roasted pork meat (from the whole, boned animal), usually served in a panino (bread roll).

In Naples, fried food stalls, friggitorie, sell filled, deep-fried pastries and other foods. A street food made of offal, commonly found in fairs and religious festivals in Naples and in the whole of Campania, is the 'O pere e 'o musso ("the paw and the muzzle"): calves' heads and pigs' feet are boiled, sliced and chopped, then seasoned with salt and lemon juice. This is also called musso re puorco ("pork muzzle"), although only calf heads are normally used.

In Lecce popular snacks are Rustico, a salty snack made of puff pastry filled with besciamella, tomato sauce and pepper and Pasticciotto (sweet pastry usually filled with egg custard but also varieties with chocolate, cherries, lemon).

Vendors sell watermelons during the summer months, as well as roasted chestnuts (caldarroste) stalls during the winter, and especially before Christmas.

Rosticcerie, while most often selling food to be eaten at home, also sometimes have a counter for immediate consumption of their goods, the most common of which are roast chicken, roast potatoes, fried polenta and other accompaniments.

Substantial immigration from Turkey and the Middle East has also gained shawarma (best known in Italy as kebab) an increasing popularity, as well as other middle-eastern traditional dishes.

Gelato (ice cream) and granita are commonly available.

In the Romagna subregion, and especially in the Forlì-Cesena province, a flatbread called piadina is available. It is sold in kiosks, usually as a sandwich filled with mixed cold cut meats, cheese, and/or vegetables. A common variant is the crescione, a piadina cooked like a turnover; in this version the most common filling are tomato sauce with mozzarella, and pumpkin with boiled potato and sausage.

==== Malta ====
Pastizzi are small, ricotta cheese- or pea-paste- filled puff-pastry squares that can be bought from vendors in practically every village in Malta. Ricotta pastizzi (pastizzi tal-irkotta) are diamond-shaped with a hole in the middle where the ricotta stuffing can be seen, while pea pastizzi (pastizzi tal-pizelli) are of the same shape but are more like an envelope of puff pastry with no holes.

The shops selling these pastries are called pastizzeriji. They also sell items such as pies, pizza al taglio, sausage rolls, baked rice, baked macaroni (timpana), and sometimes arancini.

Another local street food found in such pastizzerias is the qassatat. This is a ball-shaped pie crust with an open top, with the same two basic fillings of ricotta or peas, and sometimes a tuna and spinach mixture.

Imqaret are deep fried pastries filled with a mashed date mixture.

Hamburgers, hot dogs, and other such products being sold from vans, replace perennial Maltese favorites such as Ħobż biż-żejt, bigilla, and timpana.

Ħobż biż-żejt is usually bought from the inside of shops rather than stalls. This is the local sandwich, made from a local flat-bun called a ftira or a rounder one called hbejza which is filled with various ingredients available at the counter displays. The basic Ħobż biż-żejt recipe consists of filling the bread with oil and kunserva (tomato paste), tuna fish, pickles, and other delicacies which vary from shop to shop. These shops usually serve tea with milk in small glasses to their regulars.

Occasionally a street vendor will sell sinizza, a deep-fried ball of fish, batter, and other ingredients.

==== Netherlands ====
In the Netherlands, the French fries are thinner and generally referred to as patat (the word for potato in the south of the Netherlands and in Flanders) or friet (from the French frire meaning deep-frying) or patat friet. Some shops in the Netherlands also sell Vlaamse friet (Flemish fries, similar to the type sold in Belgium) but this is less common than the thinner variant. In the Netherlands, French fries are traditionally fried in vegetable oil.

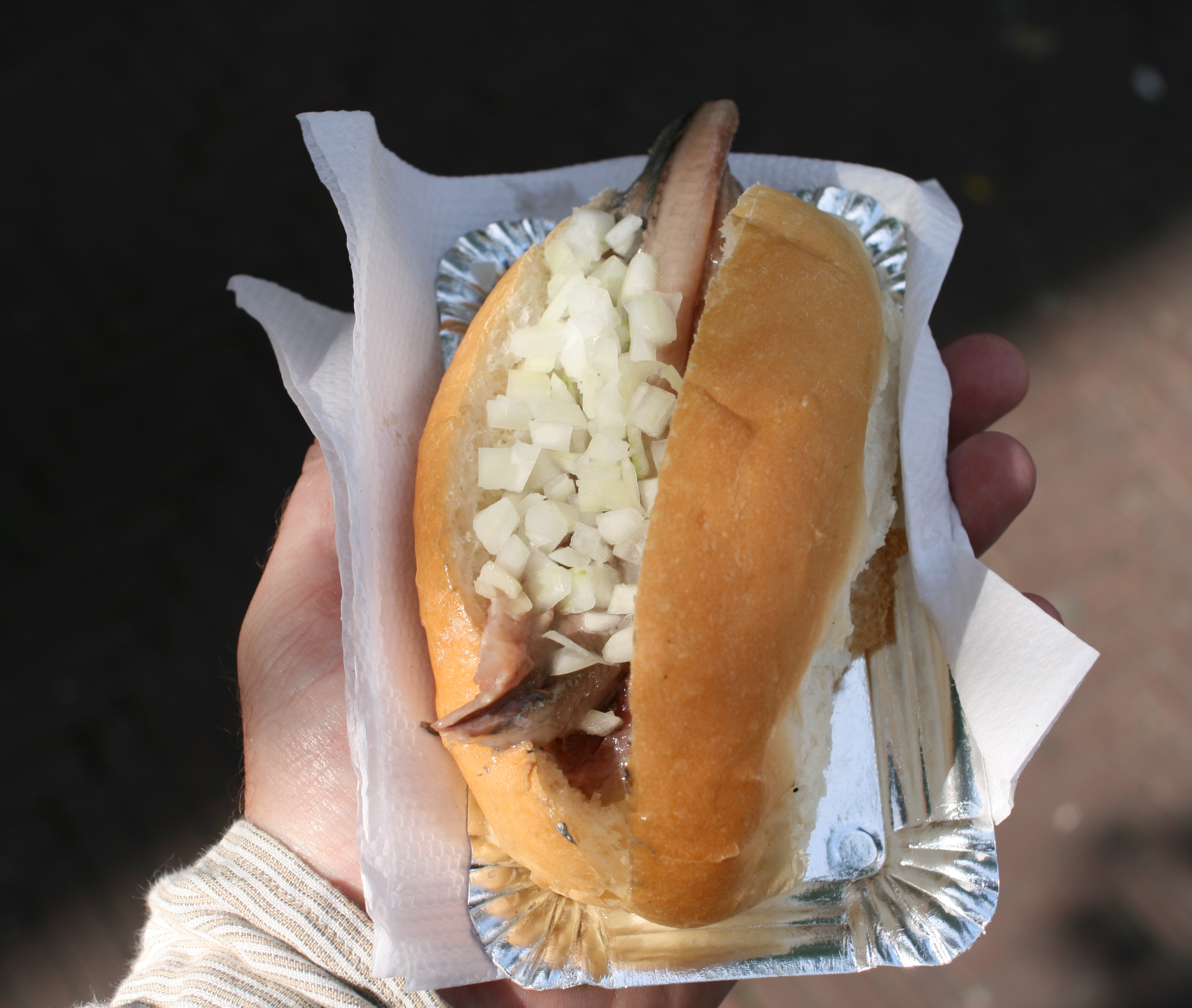
A "broodje haring met ui": a soft bun with raw herring and chopped onions

In the Netherlands, street foods are usually sold by a small store which is a mix of a cafe/bar and a fast-food restaurant, known as a snackbar or cafetaria. These stores may also contain the typically Dutch vending machine, an automatiek. While patat friet forms the main portion of the foods sold, many other items are also on offer including different types of deep-fried snack meats such as kroketten and frikandellen, and cheese snacks such as the kaassouffle (cheese deep fried inside a crispy bread crumb crust). Often, the product range includes other foods such as hamburgers, ice cream, bread rolls with different fillings, and occasionally pizza, falafel, doner kebab and shoarma. Also sold may be deep-fried Vietnamese spring rolls and other originally Asian and/or Surinamese snacks like bapao (a baozi filled with minced meat) and barra (a deep-fried savoury doughnut).

Street stalls also sell different fried, smoked and raw fish products, and are called a viskraam or haringkar (Dutch for "fish stall" or "herring cart)". Besides raw herring served with chopped onions sometimes with bread rolls and pickled cucumber, these stalls also sell fish products such as smoked mackerel, smoked eel and kibbeling (deep fried cod nuggets).

At festivals, markets and especially on New Year's Eve, street stalls around the country sell a type of beignets called oliebollen (literally 'oil balls'). They may also sell other sweet pastries such as waffles and apple beignets.

==== Poland ====
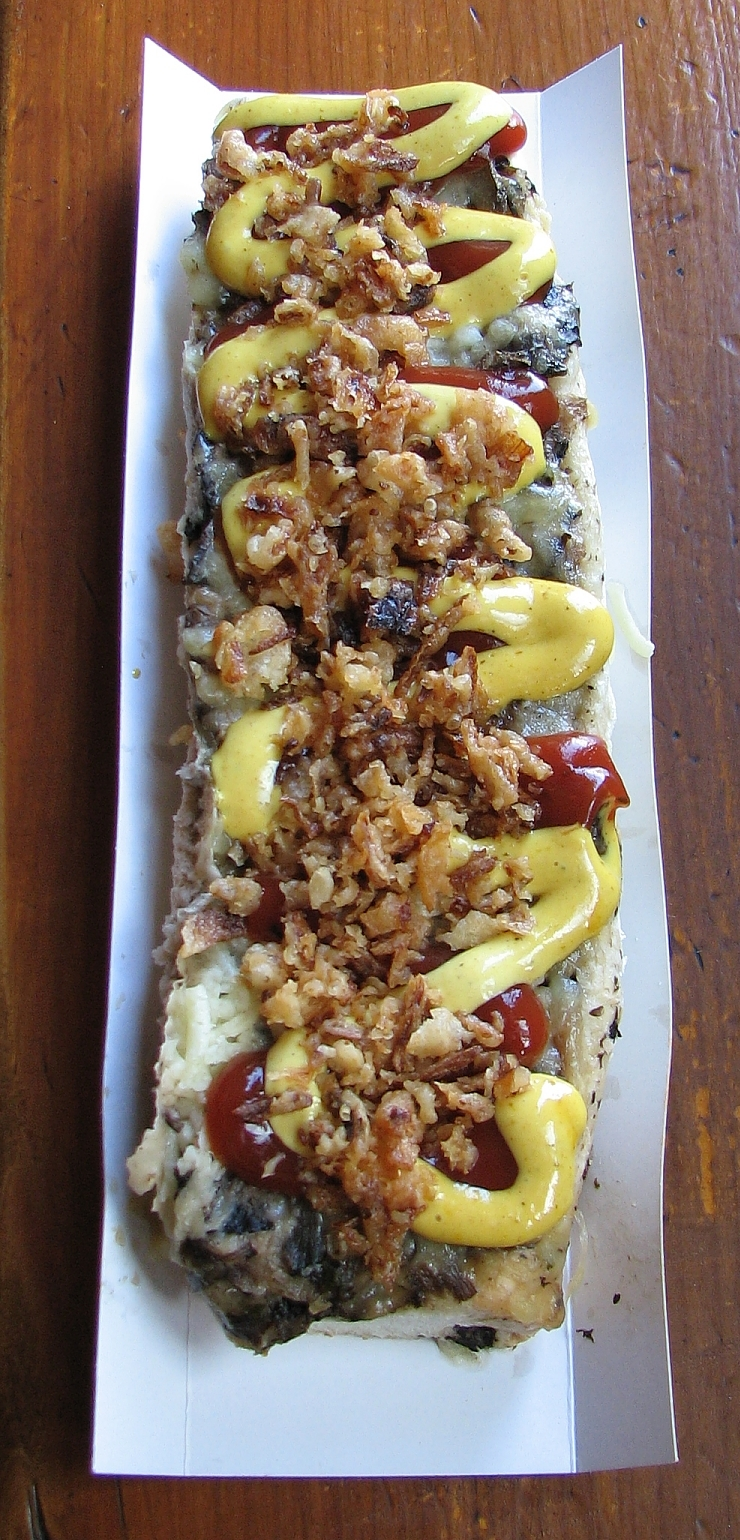
A zapiekanka

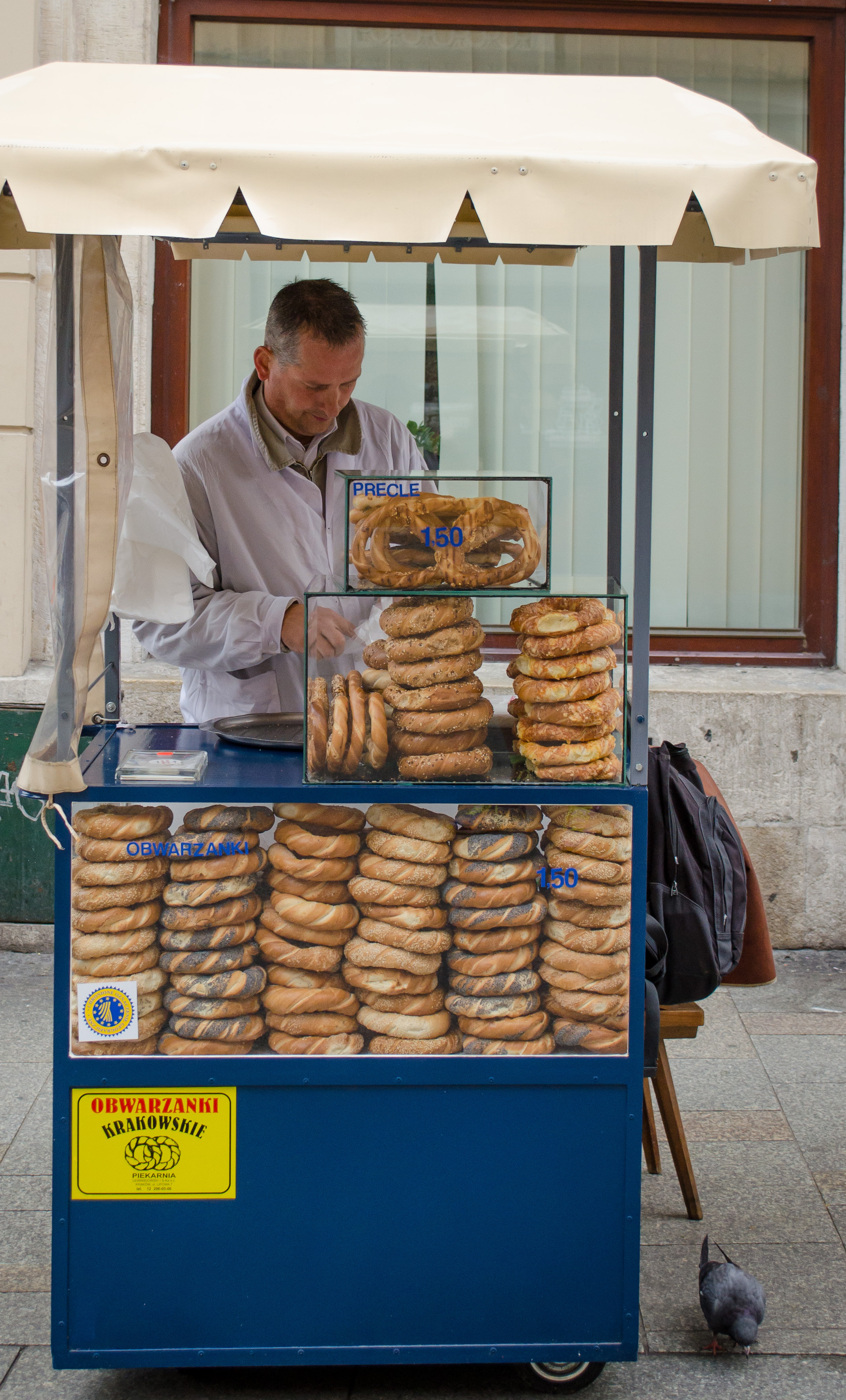
Obwarzanki salesman in Kraków

Popular street snacks in Poland include zapiekanki, essentially Polish-style French-bread pizzas with a variety of toppings; the obwarzanki krakowskie of Kraków, which are like bagels (only with bigger holes); and precle (pretzels). The most common street food in Poland, seems to be lody, or ice cream. Long lines outside ice cream shops, and scores of pedestrians toting cones, are a regular fixture of Polish streetscapes.

Many fast food shops offer waffles (gofry), topped with whipped cream, powdered sugar, fresh fruit, or fruit jelly. Some of them also serve rurki z kremem, pipes similar to ice-cream cones, filled with whipped cream.

Hot dogs, hamburgers, and french fries are also very popular, often sold in the same shops and kiosks as zapiekanki. Pizza vendors commonly offer pizza in slices. Kebab (döner kebab in pita) vendors are also present and popular, as they are often open late in the night.

==== Romania ====
In Romania the most commonly available street foods during the day are covrigi, hot pretzels covered in sesame or poppy seeds, and plăcinte. "Plăcinte" can refer to sweet or savory pies with various fillings or to large pieces of fried dough eaten with garlic sauce, sour cream, cheese, or jam, similar to Hungarian lángos. In the south and along the Black Sea, plăcintă dobrogeană is available. This type of plăcintă is more like the burek encountered in other parts of the Balkans. Doughnuts called gogoși are also commonly available. At fairs and in the winter, kürtős kalács (tulnic in Romanian) with nuts or cinnamon is very popular. Mititei or mici, small grilled skinless sausages, are often available in the summer in marketplaces and at fairs. Other street foods include popcorn, steamed ears of corn, roasted chestnuts in winter, and ice cream in summer.

==== Russia ====
Traditional Eastern European items such as blini, pirozhki, vatrushki and sausages are widely available. Kvass, a small beer made (usually) from bread, with honey being a frequent additive (medoviy kvass), is sold cold from tanks or barrels on the street.

The cuisine of Russia's Turkic minorities is popular, with dishes like chebureki, shashlik, shawerma, tandoor bread, and plov (pilaf).

In areas with Chinese immigrant populations, Chinese dishes are sold.

Ice cream is enjoyed even on the coldest days. Pizza is also available.

Kiosks sell candy, snacks, produce, beer and other beverages.

==== Slovakia ====
In Slovakia street offerings include steamed sweetcorn cobs, fried flat bread loaves with garlic and salt or other condiments (langos), fried buns with poppy seed, jam, or cream cheese filling (pirozky). Ice-cream is eaten in summer and roasted chestnuts in autumn. Ciganska pecienka (Roma-style roasted pork), roasted sausage and more are sold at Saturday markets. Crepes and fresh sandwiches are available.

==== Spain ====
The concept of eating in the street is very rooted in the Spanish culture, even though in the last few decades the law has forbidden the sale of food in the streets due to hygiene concerns. The most common way to eat is still inside a bar with friends (tapeo), however, in winter, roast chestnuts can be bought in the street, especially in the north, and during fiestas, churros are also sold. Additionally, the typical bocadillo is the most common snack all around Spain for school children and workers. Bocadillos can be filled with various foodstuffs typical of the province (anchovies, sweet peppers, tortilla de patatas, tuna, ham, meat, cheese, Empanada Gallega, etc.) and are very convenient as "food on the go". Some major cities will have vendors selling ice cream, nuts and snacks from kiosks.

During summer in Málaga (and many small towns nearby), the fruit of the higo chumbo (a local cactus) is often sold.

==== Sweden ====
A very common street food in Sweden is hot dogs, and the traditional korvkiosk ("sausage kiosk") also often serve meatballs with mashed potatoes, brown sauce and lingonberry jam. Tunnbrödsrulle ("flatbread roll") is also often sold as street food. It is a soft flatbread normally filled with a sausage and mashed potato and sometimes with prawn salad, lettuce and onion. Hamburgers and kebab are also popular street food; occasionally (up north, or at festivals/events elsewhere) with moose or reindeer meat.

==== Switzerland ====
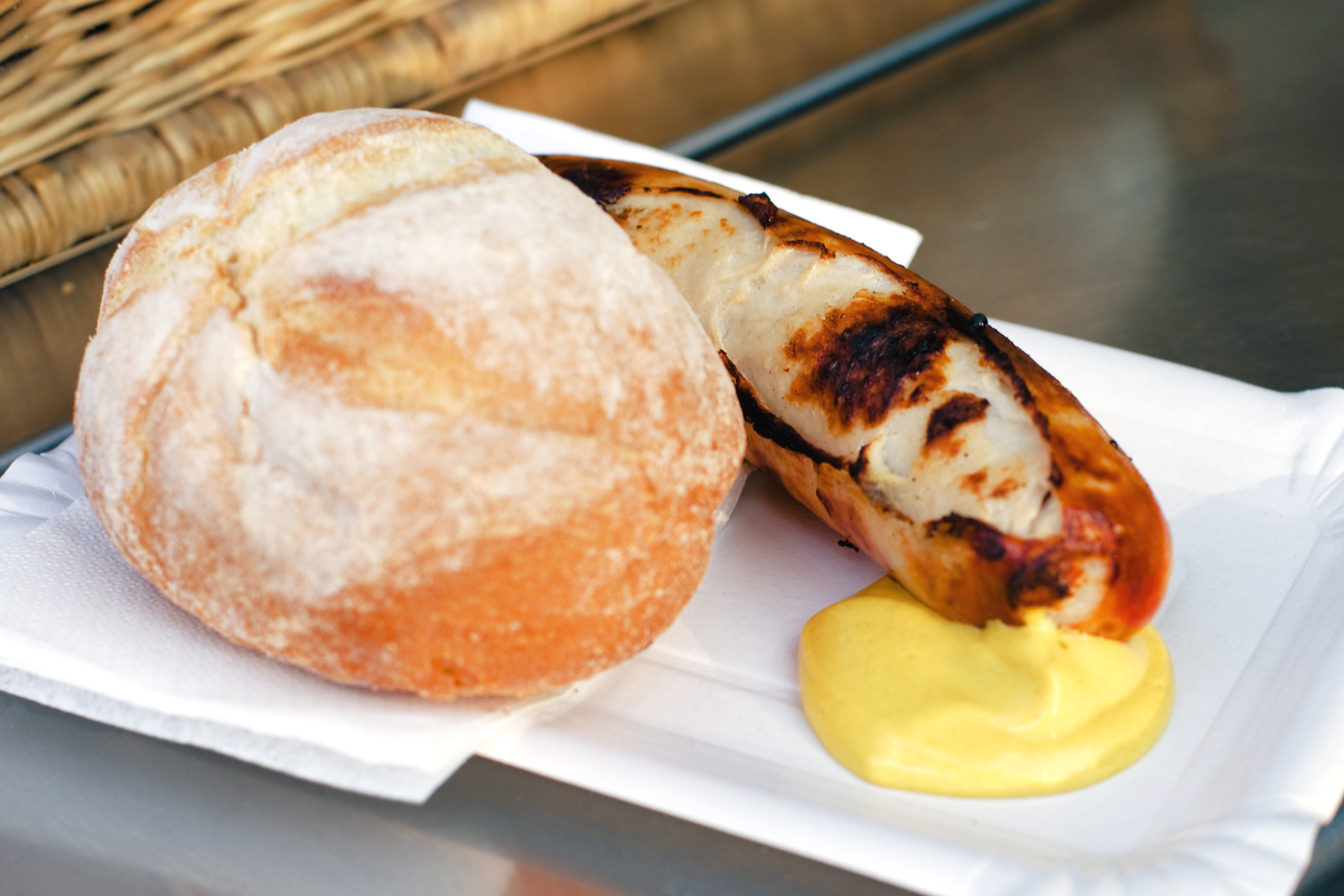
A grilled veal sausage served with bread and mustard

Street foods available in Switzerland are sandwich-like, either the typical grilled panini, but also pretzels, grilled chicken, hot dogs or the traditional Bratwurst served with a slice of bread and sometimes mustard. Raclette is also served as street food, especially in winter. Sweet foods include ice cream and crêpes. Stalls will typically be motorized trucks, rather than smaller wheeled carts.

==== Ukraine ====
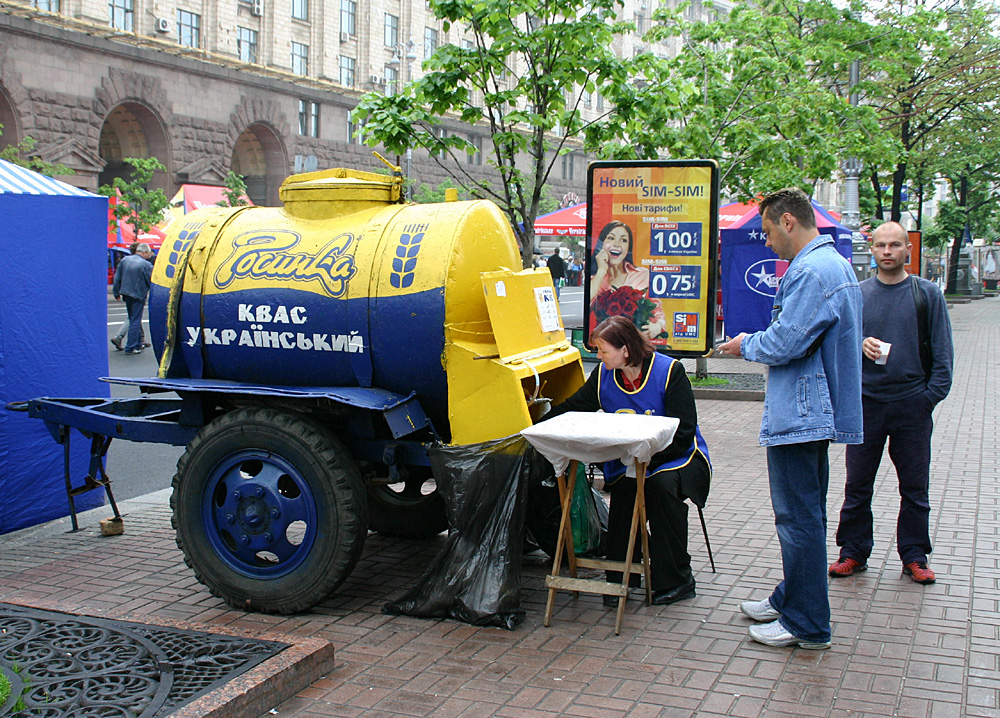
Kvass vendor in Kyiv, Ukraine

Common Ukrainian street foods include various kinds of stuffed buns and dumplings, such as perohy, pyrizhky and varenyky that are either boiled or fried and frequently served with a sour cream dill sauce. Fillings include mushrooms, onions, potatoes, ground meats and cabbage. Holubsti, cabbage rolls with rice or meat filling and a tomato sauce are also frequently serves, particularly around the holiday of Easter. Tatar influence can be found with shashliks being popular.

Kvass is a slightly fermented beverage made from rye bread, yeast and water. Dried apples and plums are steeped in sugar water which is then sold as a beverage called uzvar, particularly during festivals and fairs.

==== United Kingdom ====
Converted or purpose-built vans sell kebabs, baked potato, hamburgers and chips, especially at night. Individual portable ovens capable of being wheeled by a single man serve baked potatoes along with fillings such as cheese or chili con carne. On the coast fresh seafood is often sold straight from the catch cooked in mobile kitchens. At fairs, stalls sell candy floss and doughnuts. In Lancashire, hot parched peas (black peas) are bought from stalls, especially in the colder months. During winter there are stalls selling hot chestnuts. British street foods include fish and chips, which are frequently sold in and eaten out of a paper package.

The most common street food in the capital in earlier periods was jellied eels or pie and mash made from meat, which would be covered in the liquor from cooking the eels, although this tradition is no longer as common as in the early 20th century.

Ice cream vans are considered one of the signs of summer, and they usually play well-known tunes such as "Greensleeves" or "Teddy Bears' Picnic" through a PA system. Street carts can be seen in some cities selling products such as roast nuts and hot dogs, especially in places frequented by tourists.

=== Eurasia ===
==== Turkey ====
In 1502 Ottoman Turkey became the first country to legislate and regularize street food standards. In Turkey, street foods vary considerably from region to region.

Here is a list of most of the typical street foods that can be found around large Turkish cities:

===== Istanbul =====
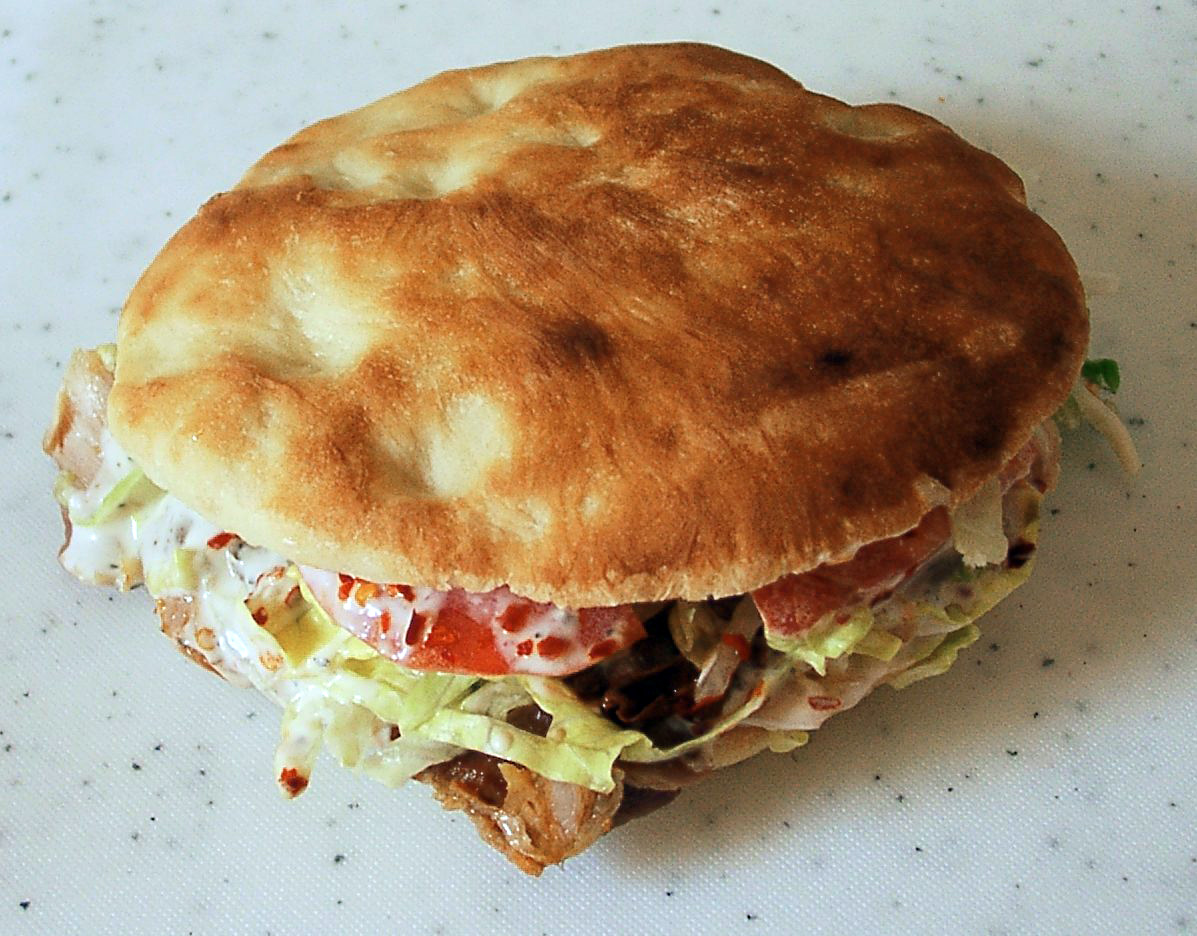
Döner served in a "tombik pide" ("fatty" pita) also called in (Turkish: gobit)

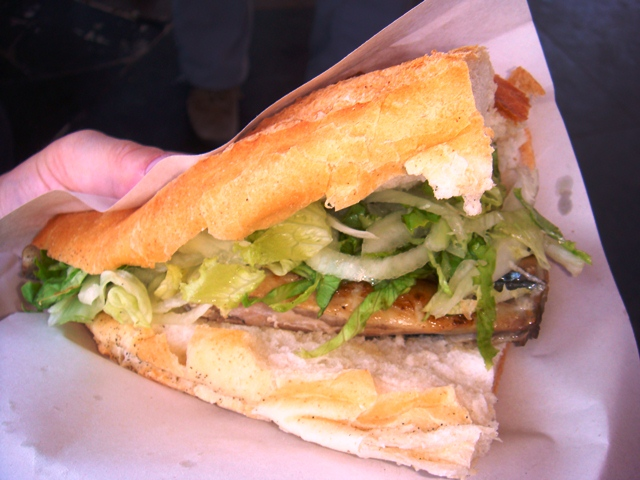
Balık ekmek: grilled fish in a Turkish pide bread

- Döner served either in:
  - Dürüm – the "Kaşarlı Dürüm" variation of Taksim is extremely popular, that consists of a toasted dürüm with kaşar cheese added to the döner meat
  - Tombik i.e. "fat bread"
- Balık ekmek – freshly cooked fish (typically mackerel, or other similar oily fish) served, along with various vegetables, inside a bun of Turkish pide bread. This is typically served on the Eminönü square straight from the boat on which it is prepared.
- Pilav – steamed rice with chicken and chickpeas, mostly sold in steam carts at night
- Midye – mussels, that come in two forms:
  - Midye dolma – stuffed mussels with rice, pine nuts and raisins, eaten cold with lemon and olive oil
  - Midye tava – mussels on a skewer, that are fried in oil, and eaten with a garlic sauce
- Kokoreç – the Istanbul version is typically cooked on a pan rather than on charcoal, and can be spicy
- Uykuluk – sweetbread and other soft glands of lamb, grilled on charcoal, and especially popular in the European Side
- Patsos – a sandwich composed of fried french fries and sausage topped with kaşar, more than popular in the Asian Side
- Dilli-kaşarlı – a tiny toast comprising thin sliced smoked beef tongue with kaşar cheese, a fine delicacy
- Adana kebabı – served in a dürüm
- Sucuk-ekmek – grilled sucuk served in fresh crusty bread as a sandwich
- Islak hamburger – another specialty of the Taksim neighbourhood, consisting of a garlic meatball in a tiny bun, that is dipped in a pepper sauce and reheated
- Kumpir – a baked potato filled to the maximum with a variety of toppings, popular around Ortaköy
- Boza – a fermented drink, drunk in winter nights

===== İzmir =====
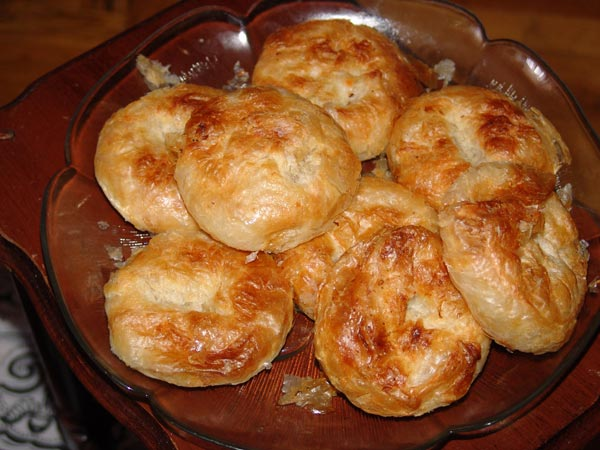
Boyoz

- Kokoreç made exclusively from milk fed lamb, grilled on hot charcoal, served barely cleaved inside of a grilled bread quarter, with very little spice, often accompanied with cold beer
- Çöp şiş – a kebab consisting of very small milk fed lamb cuts mounted on tiny skewers (made of dried squash) grilled on charcoal and served in very large numbers, around 15 at a time
- Kelle söğüş – different parts, including cheek, tongue, brain and eyes from a boiled sheep head, that are cooled and marinated in olive oil, then all chopped together and served wrapped in a lavaş with a slice of tomato and a hint of spice. It is considered to be a local delicacy of İzmir by excellence
- Közde sandviç – Literally "Sandwich on charcoal", that is bread toasted on a charcoal grill, alongside the meat and cheese that are grilled on charcoal to be then added to the toast. Comes in two main variations:
  - Kumru – lit "the Dove", that consists of a lemon-shaped bread and has mostly a cheese filling
  - Yengen – lit. "Your Aunt" that has a round and crusty bread with a meatier filling, with mayonnaise
- Midye – mussels, that come in two forms:
  - Midye dolma – stuffed mussels, different from the Istanbul version in that they are tiny, and are sold by the dozen
  - Midye tava – fried mussels, different from the Istanbul version as they are fried in olive oil and do not come with skewers
- Sardalya tava – small sardines fried in olive oil
- Boyoz – flaky pastry typical of İzmir, baked in a masonry oven and served with a hard-boiled egg
- Gevrek – the İzmir version of simit
- Turşu Suyu – sour brine that is left from pickling, consumed cold, somewhat of an acquired taste
- Lokma – a sweet summer specialty, sold on carts

===== Ankara =====
- Simit in its Ankara variant, that is thinner, and baked exclusively in masonry ovens after being brushed with pekmez, making it crustier
- Köfte-ekmek – spicy meatballs grilled on charcoal and served inside crusty bread or grilled bazlama generally consumed with ayran
- Döner – Ankara is famous with its döner.
- Kumpir - a baked potato filled to the maximum with a variety of toppings, popular in Çankaya
- Gözleme - savoury hand made and hand rolled pastry, with a selection of fillings, grilled on a sac top

===== Adana-Mersin =====
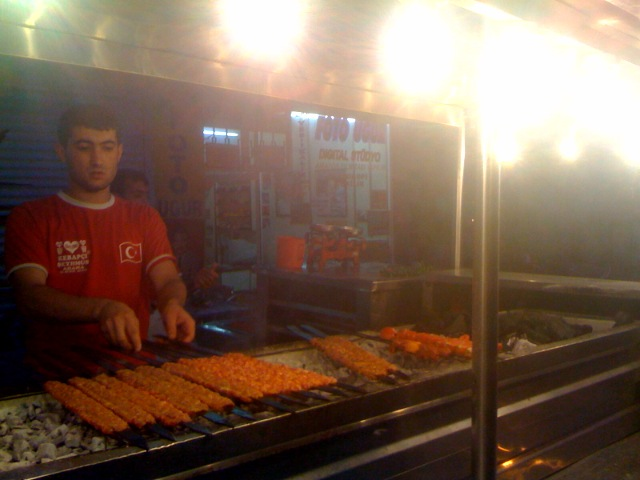
A street mangal cart serving Kıyma Kebabı in Adana

- Kıyma kebabı – a particularly delicious kebab, consisting of roasting a huge skewer of hand-minced ram meat mixed with tail-fat and red pepper on an open mangal, called "Adana Kebabı" in the rest of Turkey, eaten in its street version as a dürüm wrapped in lavaş
- Ciğer dürüm – liver that has been roasted on a mangal, alternatively with pieces of tail-fat, wrapped with onions, parsley and pomegranate syrup in a dürüm that takes a "V" shape
- Tantuni a spicy lavash wrap consisting of julienned lamb stir-fried on a sac on a hint of cotton oil, a specialty of Mersin
- Şırdan – boiled sheep rumen filled with rice, and eaten with cumin, considered to be an Adana delicacy
- Bici bici – a very popular ice dessert, consisting of sweetened peeled ice put on top of diced haytalya pieces (sweet semolina jelly) swimming in rose syrup. The peeled ice is then lightly soaked with different natural syrups, coloring it. This particular dessert is nowhere to be found outside of Adana-Mersin, and until very recently, could be only bought from street vendors
- Şalgam – a beverage made of fermented red and black carrots, very sour, that comes in mild and hot versions. Both Adana and Mersin compete for the best Şalgam

===== Antep =====
- Beyran – a dish made of a small amount of rice topped with the soft meat and neck fat of lamb in a small copper plate that is left to burn on a potent fire for some time. considered to be an Antep delicacy
- Nohut dürüm – a very interesting dürüm made out of chickpeas steamed in a spicy sauce, that are served crushed and wrapped in a thick lavaş. This may be Turkey's only entirely vegetarian dürüm.
- Cağırtlak – liver, fat, and other offal (mostly heart and kidney) are impaled on skewers and grilled on a mangal to be served in a lavaş, a favorite late-night dish of Eastern Turkey
- Fıstıklı kebap – lit. "Kebab with pistachio" is basically a Kıyma Kebabı less the spice and plus the ground pistachios that are added in the mixture. The street version is served as a dürüm.
- Urmu dutu – the juice of freshly squeezed sour blackberries (a variety endemic to the region) that is typically only sold in the street carts, where the blackberries are cooled on a block of ice.

===== Urfa =====
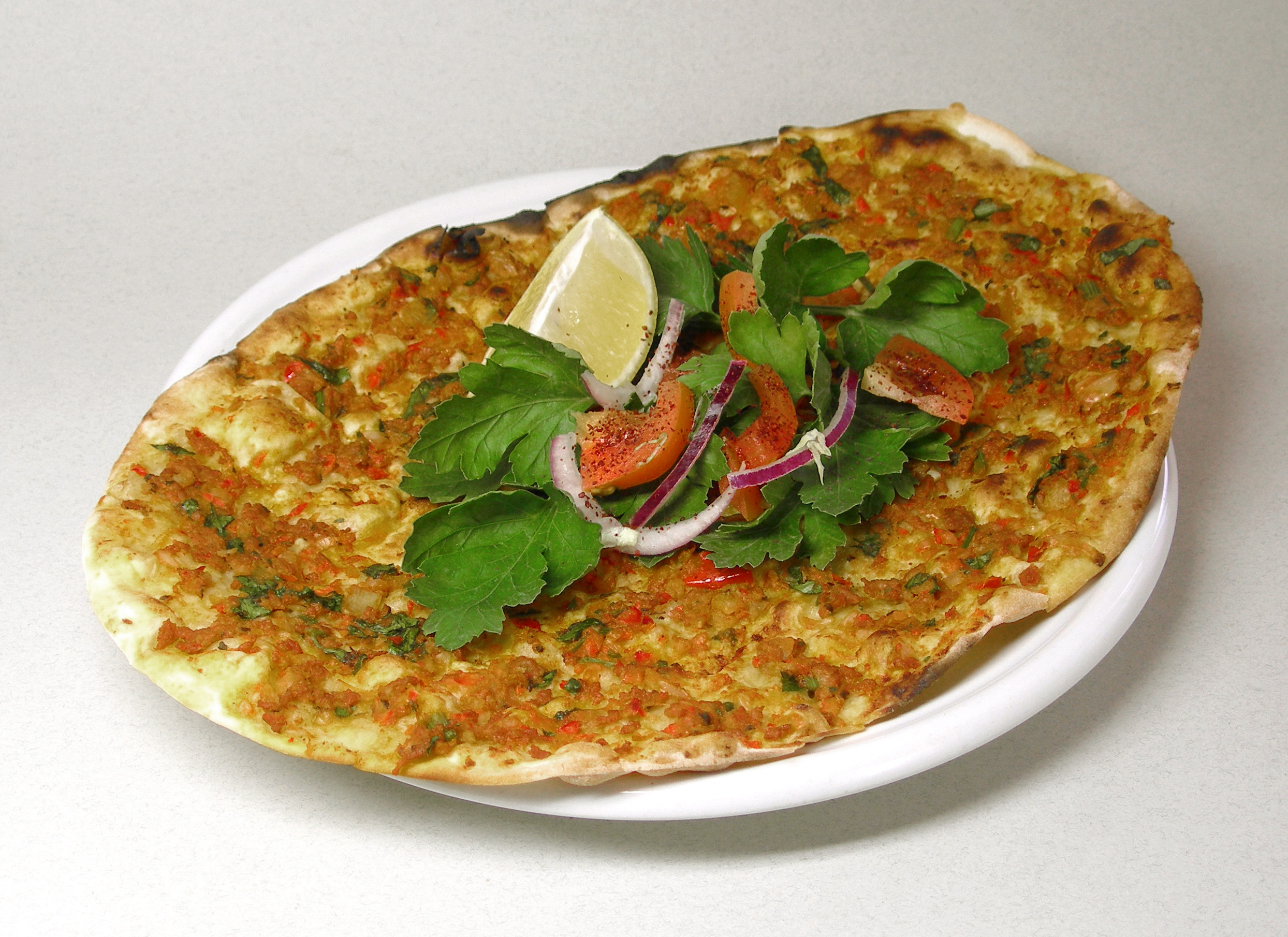
Turkish Lahmacun with salad

- Lahmacun – ubiquitous to the city, with the street version being substantially smaller than the regular one, and sold by higher quantity
- Çiğ köfte dürüm – consists of çiğ köfte that has been wrapped with a lettuce leaf inside a dürüm
- Haşhaş kebabı – a local variation of the Kıyma Kebabı, very popular in Aleppo as well, that is made by hand-mincing the meat in a thinner manner than the classic recipe, and by adding crushed garlic into the mixture.
- Ciğer dürüm – sold everywhere in the streets of the city and even eaten for breakfast, it consists of 8 skewers of charcoal grilled lamb liver and tail fat, marinated with Urfa pepper wrapped in a dürüm with cumin, sumac and onions.
- Yürek dürüm – the same wrap as the Ciğer dürüm, but with lamb heart instead of the liver, eaten the same way, slightly seasoned with paprika.
- Böbrek dürüm – skewers of unseasoned lamb kidneys, wrapped with onions and sumac.

=== North America ===
==== Barbados ====
In Barbados, fishcakes are a common street food. Fishcakes are made with bits of saltfish, seasoned and mixed with flour and then deep fried. Fishcakes are sold at community events such as school fairs and concerts and can also be found at fish fries such as those in Baxter's Road in the capital city of Bridgetown or the Friday evening event in the southern fishing town of Oistins. Fishcakes are commonly eaten with saltbread, a thick, round bread; the sandwich is called a "bread-and-two" and can be found at most village shops throughout the island.

==== Canada ====
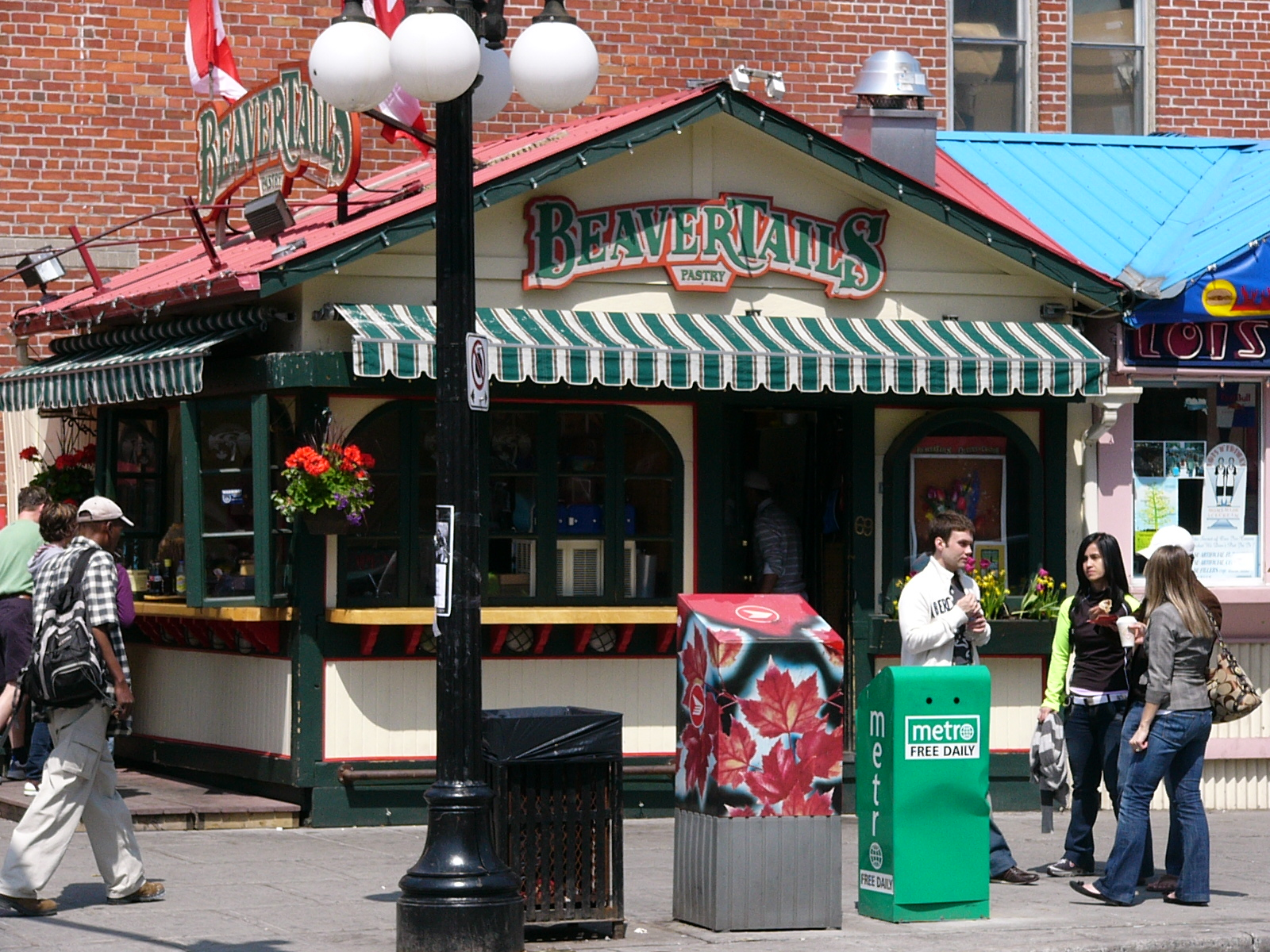
The first BeaverTails stand in Ottawa's Byward Market.

While most major cities in Canada offer a variety of street food, regional "specialties" are notable. Poutine (french fries with gravy and cheese curds) is available virtually everywhere across the country with thousands of different flavours and combinations. Similarly, hot dog stands can be found across Canada, but are far more common in Ontario (often sold from mobile canteen trucks, usually referred to as "chip wagons") than in Vancouver or Victoria (where the "Mr. Tube Steak" franchise is notable). Originating in Montréal, the steamé is a different type of sausage than the traditional hot dog found elsewhere, it is steamed. A more expensive version is called the toasté and is toasted. These types of sausage have spread across the country to some degree but they remain most popular in Montréal. Falafel and pizza slices are foreign dishes that are popular nationwide, to varying degrees in different cities. Shawarma is quite prevalent in Ottawa, while Halifax offers its own unique version of the doner kebab called the donair, which features a sauce, made from condensed milk, sugar, and vinegar. The donair has spread across the country in pizza chains and other fast food restaurants. Also originating in Halifax, and now having spread somewhat are garlic fingers, a pizza-like dish with baked dough, cheese, and garlic but no tomato sauce and a different crust. Ice cream trucks can be seen (and often heard) nationwide during the summer months. Corn on the Cob is found commonly as well, often grilled, particularly at country fairs. British influence is seen nationwide with the very popular fish and chips often sold at chip wagons. Crêpes are also found, with sweet or savoury fillings. A growing trend has seen the emergence of grilled cheese becoming popular as a street food as of late.

In terms of desserts, butter tarts are extremely popular, as are nanaimo bars. Very popular as well as BeaverTails, a fried dough pastry originating in Ottawa. Vendors also sell fruits and nuts during the summer months and some move indoors, particularly to train stations during the harsh winter months.

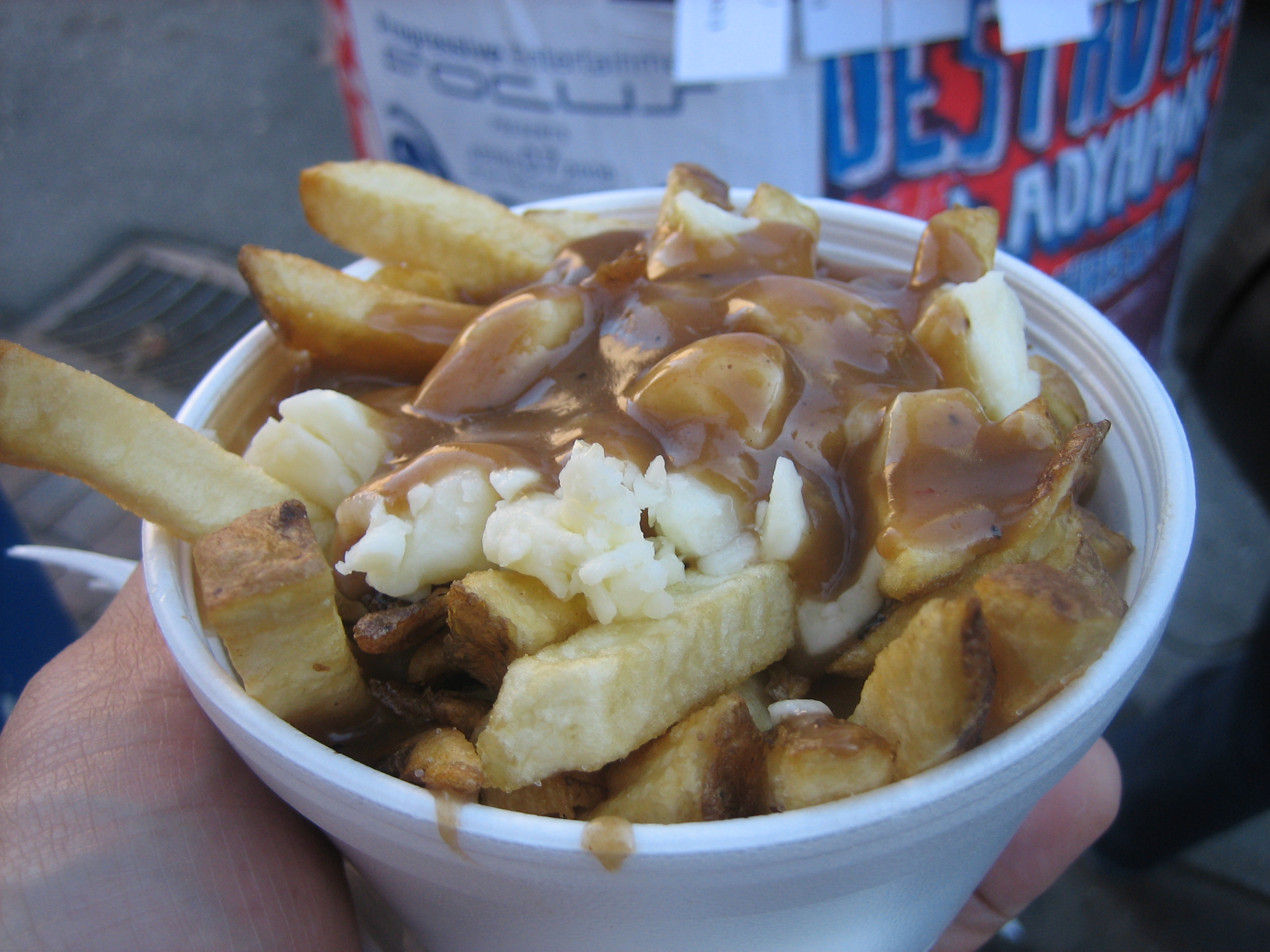
Poutine in Vancouver

Unique Canadian street foods

- Poutine
- Montreal hot dog
- Donair
- Butter tart
- Nanaimo bar
- BeaverTails

==== Dominican Republic ====
Fried foods are common in the Dominican Republic. Empanadas are a very typical snack, made of fried flour, though empanadas made out of cassava flour, called catibias, are also common. Fillings include cheese, chicken, beef, and vegetables, or a combination of these. Yaniqueques are sold at many empanada stands. Yaniqueques (from Jonnycake) are essentially round flour shaped cakes which are fried and usually eaten with salt and/or ketchup. Other vendors sell plantain fritters and fried or boiled salami.

Hamburgers are sold at stands called chimis, which also offer sandwiches called chimichurris, not to be confused with Argentine sauce of the same name. Chimis occasionally also offer hot dogs and other sandwich varieties.

Corn on the cob can be bought on the street, usually sold by traveling vendors who move around on a tricycle. Sweets vendors who sell treats such as candied coconut and dulce de leche sell their goods at major intersections in cities and sometimes have their own stand. Often, fruit vendors also prepare platters of chopped pineapple, mango, banana and/or papaya topped with honey or syrup.

==== Haiti ====
In Haiti street vendors sell dishes such as fried plantains, griot (deep-fried pork or beef), frescos (fruit soda drink), cassava bread, pig's ears, and Haitian patties (pastry filled with choice of chicken, fish, beef, or pork).

==== Jamaica ====
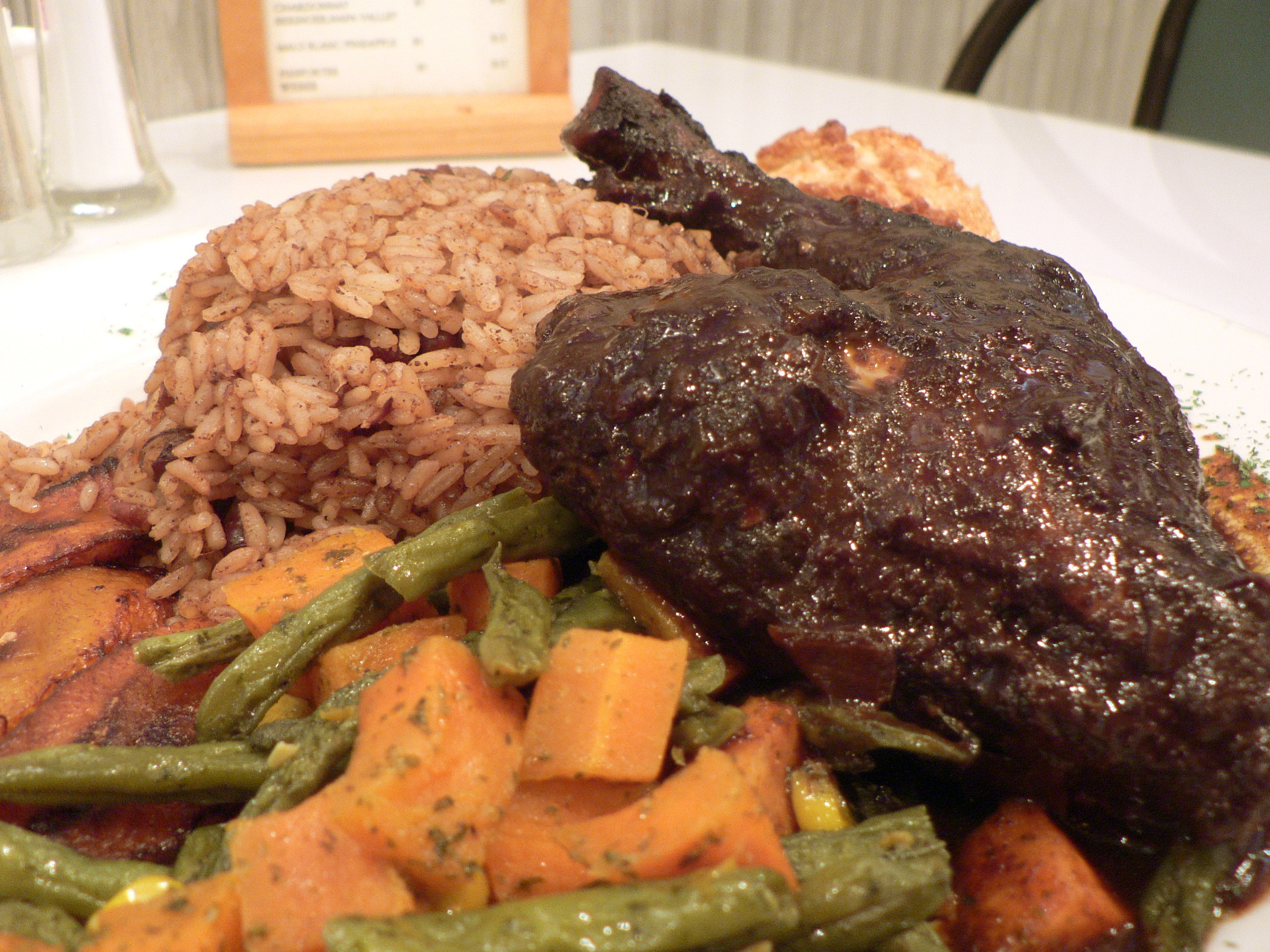
A plate of jerk chicken, with rice, plantains, carrots and green beans

The most common Jamaican street food is jerk chicken or pork and can be found everywhere on the island. Jerk is marinade that is a blended primarily from a combination of scotch bonnet peppers, onions, scallions, thyme and allspice. Once marinated, it is often barbecued on converted steel drum or whatever else locals can construct as a grill/smoker. It is often accompanied with breadfruit and/or festival, a sweetened fried dough.

Meat patties in a yeast bread called "coco bread" are the most popular street food. At Easter, bun and cheese is also eaten as a popular snack.

==== Mexico ====
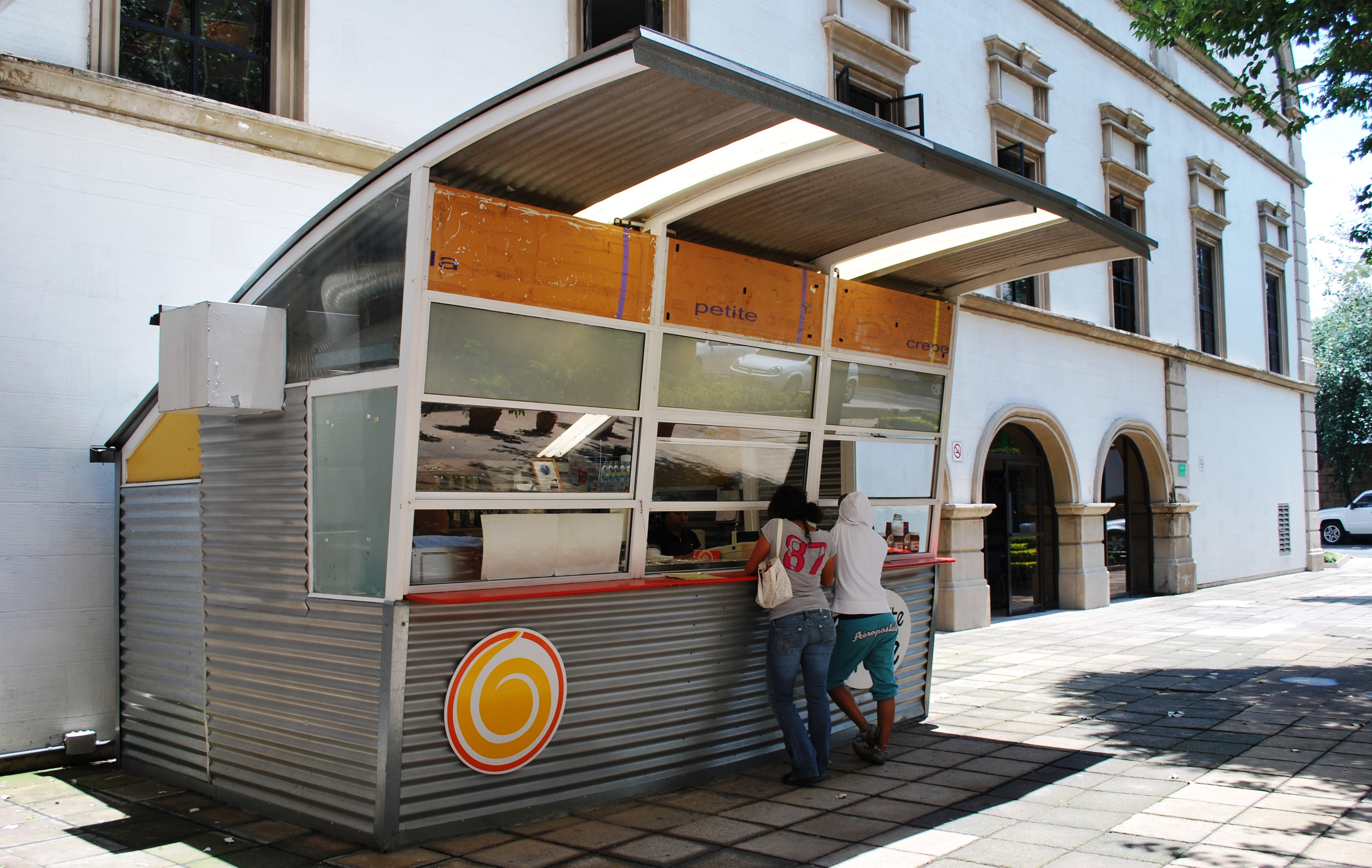
A street food vendor in Mexico City selling crepes

In Mexico, there is a great variety of antojitos Mexicanos that are found at street food vendors, at any time of night or day: tacos, tortas (traditional Mexican sandwiches), tostadas, picadas, quesadillas, guaraches, panuchos, sopes, gorditas, tamales, atole, aguas frescas, and cemitas.

==== Puerto Rico ====
Puerto Rico is well known for its street foods (referred to collectively as cuchifritos in New York City) and is popular both in the Caribbean and in mainland North America. Typical Bastreet foods include pinchos (a kebob of skewered pork, seafood or chicken, usually spicy and topped with barbecue sauce on bread; often fried whole).

Empanadas are very popular. Fried flour or yuca flour pastries stuffed with chicken, ground meat, potatoes, corn, fruit, cheese, or seafood. There are also combinations such as cheese with meat, cheese with fruit, potatoes with meat, even pigeon peas with coconut and pizza empanadas.

There's the papa rellena, fried potato balls stuffed with meat or cheese.

Alcapurria, masa made from cassava or traditional taro with green banana. The masa is filled with meat or seafood. The masa can also contains a small amount of potatoes, plantains, and/or calabazas (tropical pumpkins). Picadillo is the typical stuffing.

There are also arepas stuffed with fried meat, seafood salad or usually seafood cooked in coconut milk if one likes.

Dishes based on plantains or green bananas are popular as street food throughout Puerto Rico. Pasteles are a combination of mashed tubers, plantains, or bananas filled with pork and wrapped in banana leaves and then boiled. Pionono a sliver of ripe plantain sliced down the middle, fried and then stuffed with ground meat, cheese, raisins, capers, and olives. Plátano relleno similar to papa rellena but with ripe plantains rather than potatoes.

Bacalaítos are a fried pancake-like dough that are served with salted codfish. These foods can be found on the side of just about any busy street, but also typically in kiosks, often near the beach.

Sorullos a fried cornmeal batter shaped like fat fingers; they can be sweet or savory. Sorullos are stuffed with Puerto Rican white cheese, Cheddar or mozzarella and is served with Russian dressing. Sweet sorullos contain sugar and are filled with Puerto Rican white cheese and fruit paste such as goiabada.

Arañitas get their name from their shape, a play on araña, or spider. These shredded green plantain fritters are mixed with mashed garlic, cilantro and fried.

Cuchifrito is about as simple a dish. Essentially, slice off a chunk of pork (the ear, the stomach, or the tail), cover it in batter, and deep-fry.

The almojábana is a fritter made flour from rice, baking soda, cheese (Creole, cheddar, or mozzarella), Parmesan cheese, milk and egg. This mixture is used to make a dough that is fried into a ball. This frying is done mostly in the Western region of the island where one could find on sale in stalls, cafés and festivities.

==== Trinidad and Tobago ====
In Trinidad and Tobago there are roti wrap and shark and bake stands that provide quick foods like roti, dhal puri, fried bake, and the most popular, Doubles. Roti is a thin flat bread originating from India that is fluffy on the inside and crispy and flaky on the outside. It is cooked on a flat iron plate called a tawah (Hindi tawa) or platain and served with curried chicken, pork or beef. Dahl puri is similar to the roti but is softer and pliable and has crushed dahl lentils cooked with saffron and placed in the centre of the dough before it is rolled out and cooked. This is also served with either curried chicken, pork or beef.

Fried bake is made by frying flattened balls of dough that becomes fluffy and increases in height as it is fried. It can be served with fried ripe plantains, meat or gravy. At the shark & bake stands fried bakes filled with well-seasoned shark fillets and dressed with many different condiments including pepper, garlic and chadon beni can also be found.

Doubles is made with two flat breads called baras (from Hindi bara, "big") that are filled with channa (from Hindi "chick peas") and topped with pepper, cucumber chutney, mango chutney, coconut chutney or bandania/chadon beni. It can be eaten either wrapped up as an easy to eat sandwich, or open it up and eat each bara separately.

==== United States ====
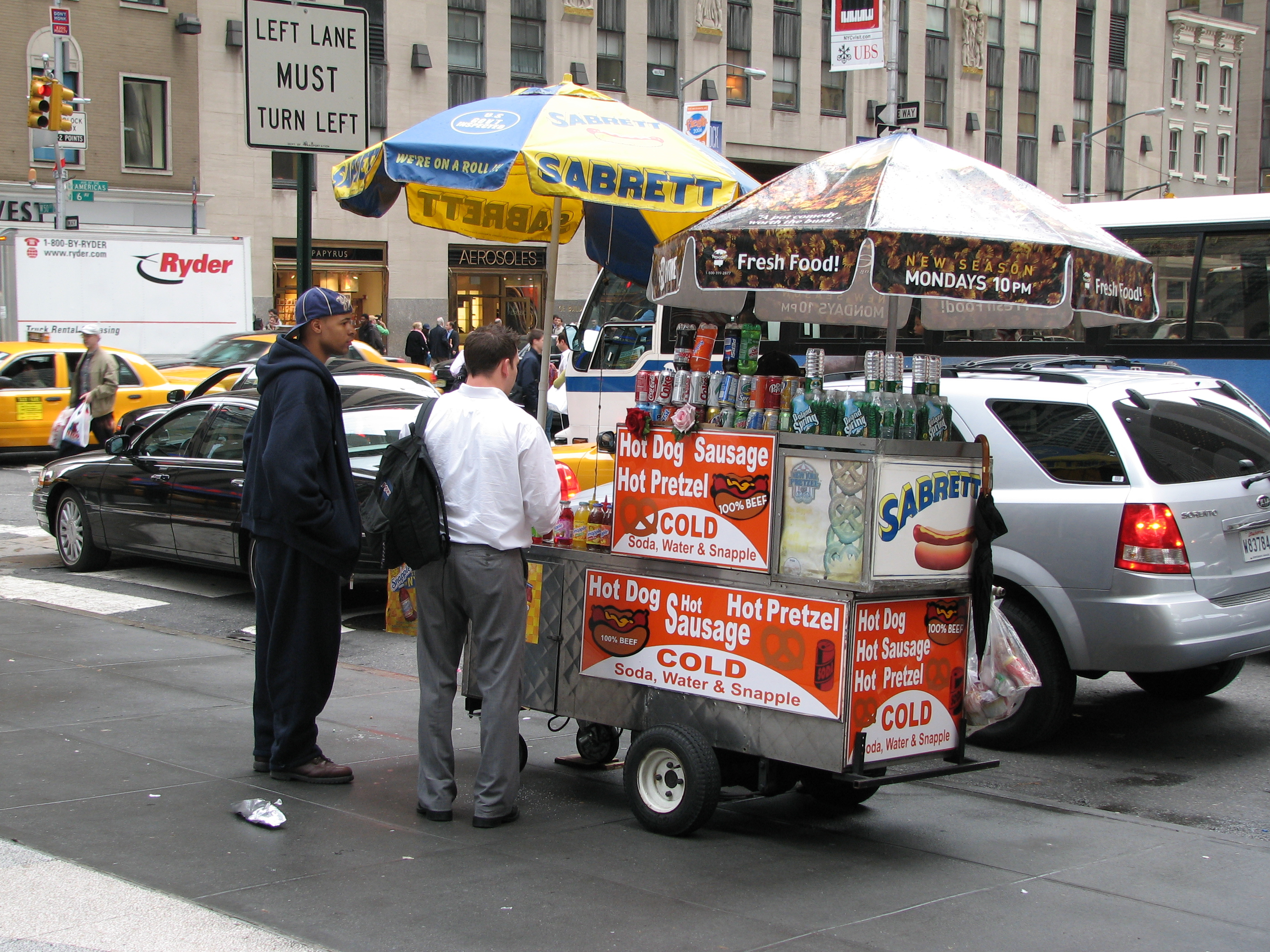
Street food vendor in New York City.

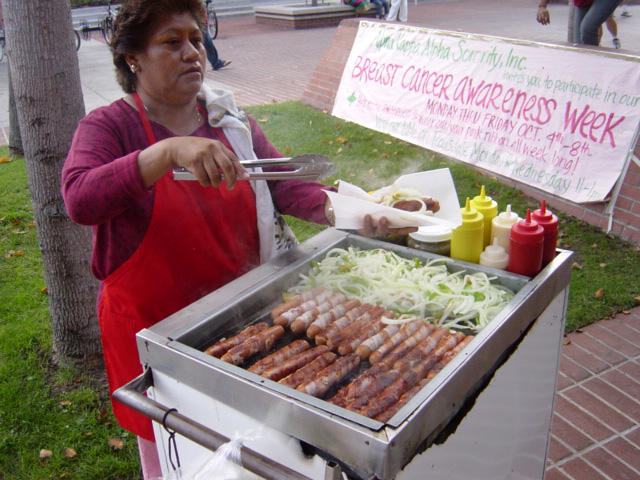
Street food vendor in Los Angeles serving a bacon-wrapped hot dog

In the United States, hot dogs and their many variations (corn dogs, chili dogs) are perhaps the most common street food, particularly in major metropolitan areas such as New York City. Roasted nuts and gyros are often sold in the cities. Cheesesteaks, breakfast sandwiches, and soft-pretzels are common in Philadelphia. Throughout the US, ice cream is sold out of trucks. Tacos and Tortas are sold from open food stalls. Pizza and egg rolls are available from window counters.

Some vendors operate out of food trucks and food carts, which offer a low overhead for entrepreneurs and often serve a huge variety of cuisines. Like restaurants, they are regulated and subject to inspections by local municipal or county health departments. Food trucks surged in popularity after the success of the Korean–Mexican fusion truck Kogi Korean BBQ in Los Angeles in 2009. According to Smithsonian Magazine, the hip new generation of food trucks "are the new incubators of culinary innovation," with Kogi serving novel concoctions such as kimchi quesadillas, and gourmet ice cream truck Coolhaus serving inventive flavors such as Avocado Sriracha, Brown Butter Candied Bacon, and Fried Chicken & Waffles.

Diversity and the lack of a strictly defined national cuisine means that, in most urban areas in the US and Canada, vendors sell hot dogs, pizza, falafel, gyros, kebobs, tortilla-based snacks such as tacos and burritos, panini, crêpes, french fries, egg rolls, and other various dishes.

==== Virgin Islands ====
Popular street foods in the Virgin Islands include pâtés, fried fish, fried chicken leg and johnnycake (fried dough). Pates, similar to the empanadas of Puerto Rico and the Dominican Republic, consist of fried flour filled with various meats, including conch, saltfish, beef, chicken and lobster.

=== Oceania ===
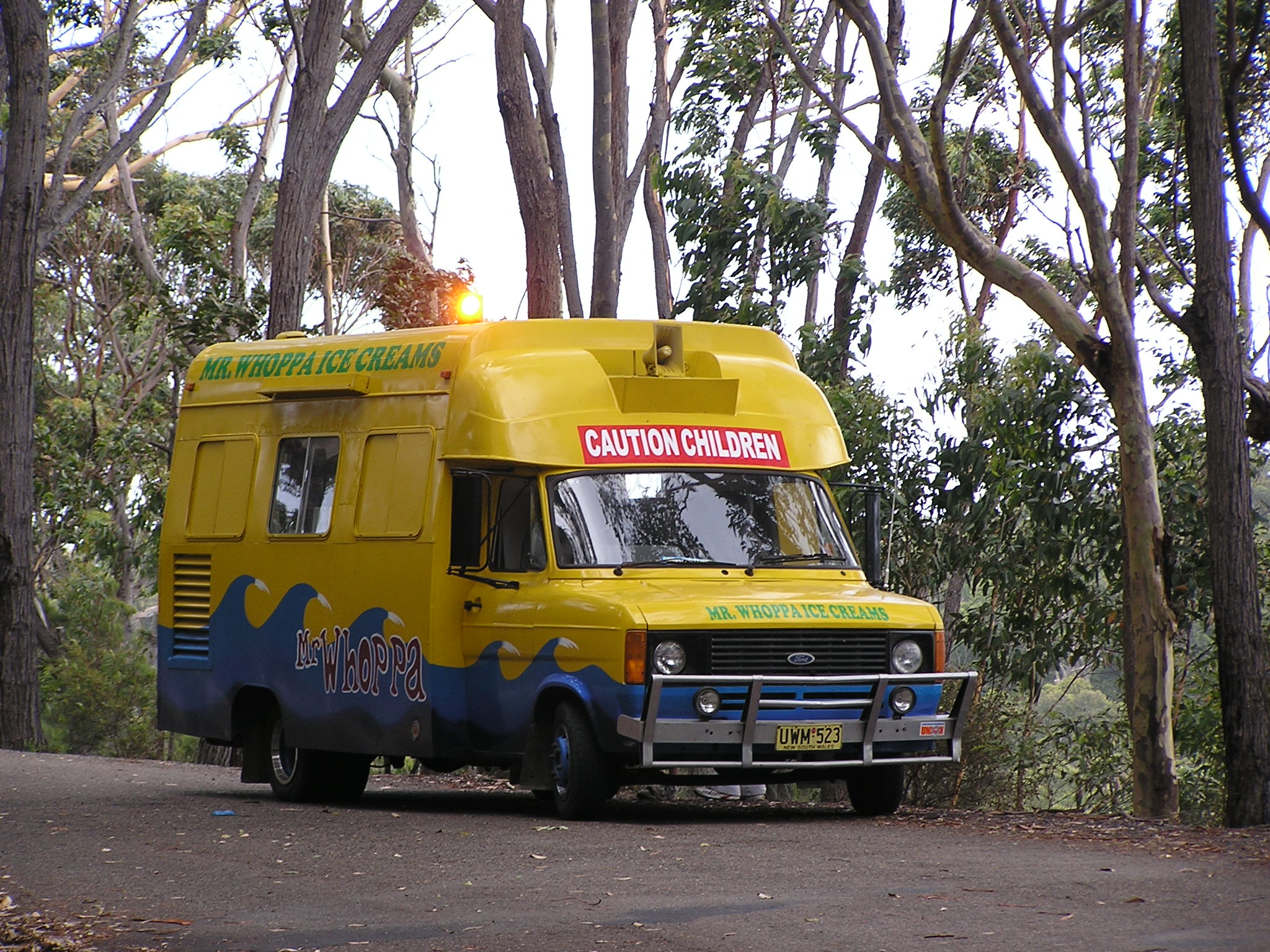
An ice cream van at Batemans Bay, New South Wales, Australia

==== Australia ====
The most common street food in Australia is the sausage sizzle, usually consisting of a thin sausage or sandwich steak cooked on a barbecue and served on a slice of bread with optional fried onions, cheese, mustard and tomato or barbecue sauce. The stalls are usually run by local sporting or charity groups as fundraiser. Some parts of Adelaide with higher percentages of Greek and Lebanese residents prefer to serve sausage sizzle wrapped in pita rather than on a slice of bread.

A pie floater is a meal served at pie carts in Adelaide and elsewhere in South Australia. It was once more widely available in other parts of Australia, but its popularity waned. It consists of an Australian meat pie covered with tomato sauce, sitting in a plate of green pea soup.

People can buy soft serve and other ice creams from vans which drive around the streets. The vans alert potential customers with a tinkling tune, for example "Greensleeves" or "The Entertainer".

In Melbourne and Sydney, kebabs and souvlakis have taken over as the main street food due to the high percentage of Greek and Lebanese people in both cities, and is popular as a late night snack, especially after a few beers. They are known to curb late night drunken violence as punters gather around and enjoy a meal together and share stories of their night. In Adelaide, this food is called "yiros" and is more commonly sold as takeaway rather than as street food.

Banh mi, sometimes advertised as "Vietnamese pork roll" have recently become more popular as street food in Australia. Cold rolls and sushis are also commonly available a take-away finger food.

==== New Zealand ====
Vans selling burgers, New Zealand hotdogs (a battered sausage on a stick), toasted sandwiches and chips are the most common type of street food in New Zealand. The White Lady food van in downtown Auckland is a well-known icon of the city. Many coffee carts and coffee vans operate on the streets, both independent ones as well as vans operating as part of a franchise system such as The Coffee Guy.

Like Australia, ice cream vans and sausage sizzles are also common in New Zealand. The most well known ice cream franchise is Mr Whippy, a franchise that originally came from England, and also operates in Australia. Mr Whippy soft-serve ice cream is an iconic symbol of a New Zealand summer to many Kiwis.

=== South America ===
==== Argentina ====
In Argentina, vendors sell choripan, a barbecued sausage served wrapped in French bread, or morcipan, using a blood sausage (morcilla) instead.

Pizza is very popular, in part due to the country's heavy Italian immigration in the early 20th century. Local versions include the fugazzeta, a pizza made with mozzarella cheese and onions, and the fainá: a pizza made with garbanzo bean flour with no toppings, generally served as a side dish to regular pizza.

The empanada, which in gourmet versions is baked, is usually deep-fried in this case. Empanadas can be made with beef, fish, ham & cheese, neapolitan (using the same toppings as that pizza) or vegetarian.

Sandwiches are usually served hot, like the tostado or the lomito, the latter having a great number of versions, with food courts offering all kinds of ingredients and combinations.

Other local street food includes local versions of the hotdog called pancho, and the hamburger or hamburguesa. Despite being very popular in the past, these have been displaced by a number of reasons, mainly a local perception that American-style foods are unhealthy and of low quality.

Sweets and desserts usually found in Argentine streets include caramel apple (manzana acaramelada), cotton candy (algodon de azucar), sweet popcorn (pochoclo) and a local snack called garrapiñada, which is made of peanuts, vanilla and sugar caramel, and sold in small bags in the shape of tubes.

==== Brazil ====
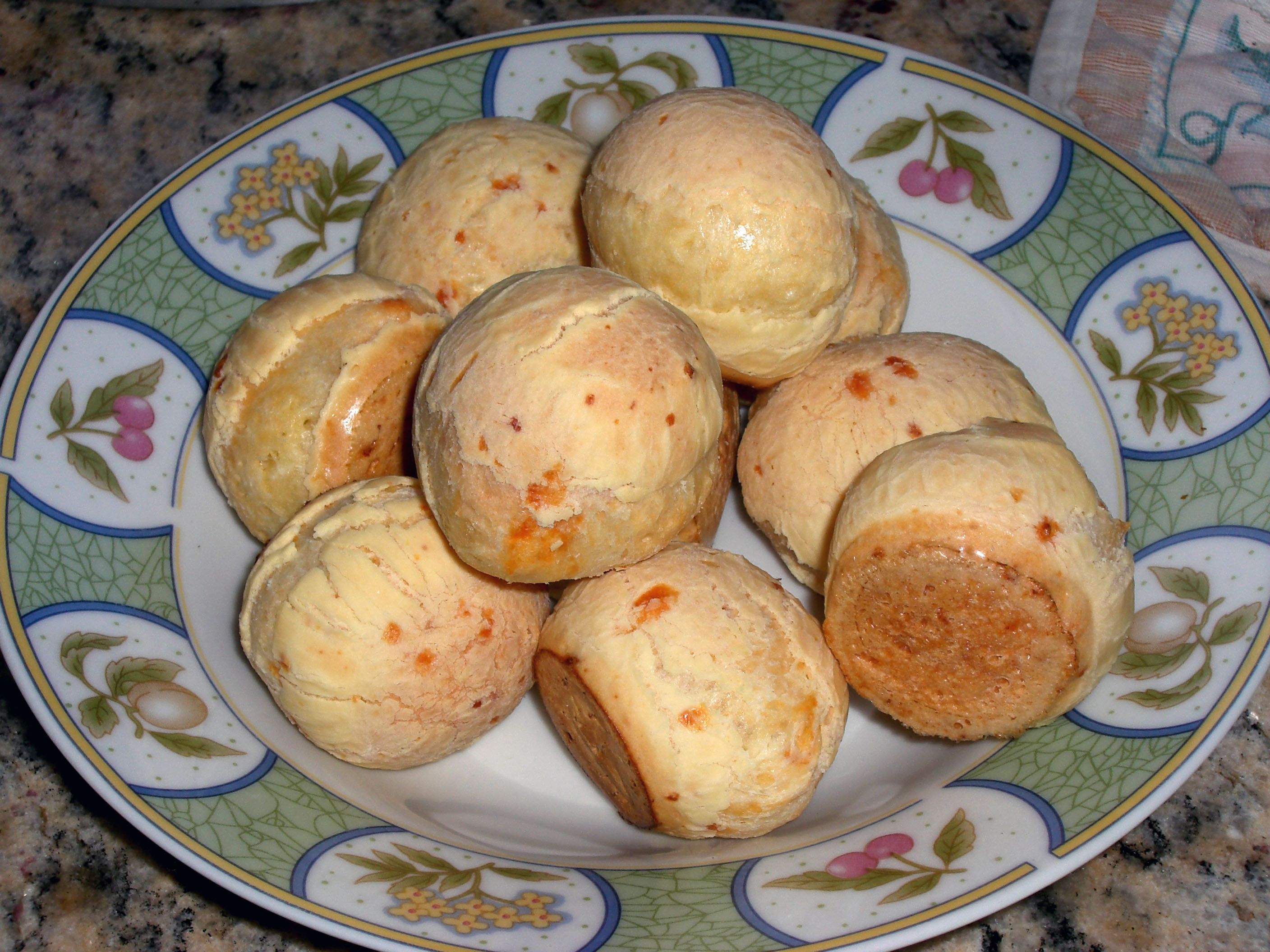
Pão de queijo

Pão de queijo (lit. "cheese bread") is a street snack in the southeast of Brazil and, increasingly, the rest of the country. Hot dogs, containing one or more sausages cooked in a tomato-based sauce with bell peppers and onions, are often sold with many toppings, including but not limited to: grated cheese, catupiry, ketchup, mayonnaise, green peas, onions, corn kernels, tomatoes, bacon, shredded chicken, shoestring fries, potato salad and mashed potatoes. Hamburgers are also offered with an assortment of toppings, such as mozzarella cheese, bacon, fried eggs, lettuce, tomato, mayonnaise, ketchup and mustard, the popular "X-Tudo" (or cheese-all, a souped up cheeseburger). Sandwiches of calabresa sausage, which is similar in taste to pepperoni, are also popular. All over the country, popcorn is offered in push carts, both savory or sweet (with sugar and cocoa powder). Churros push carts (sausage shaped deep fried dough filled with a choice of doce-de-leite caramel or chocolate sauce) are also found on any major city street.

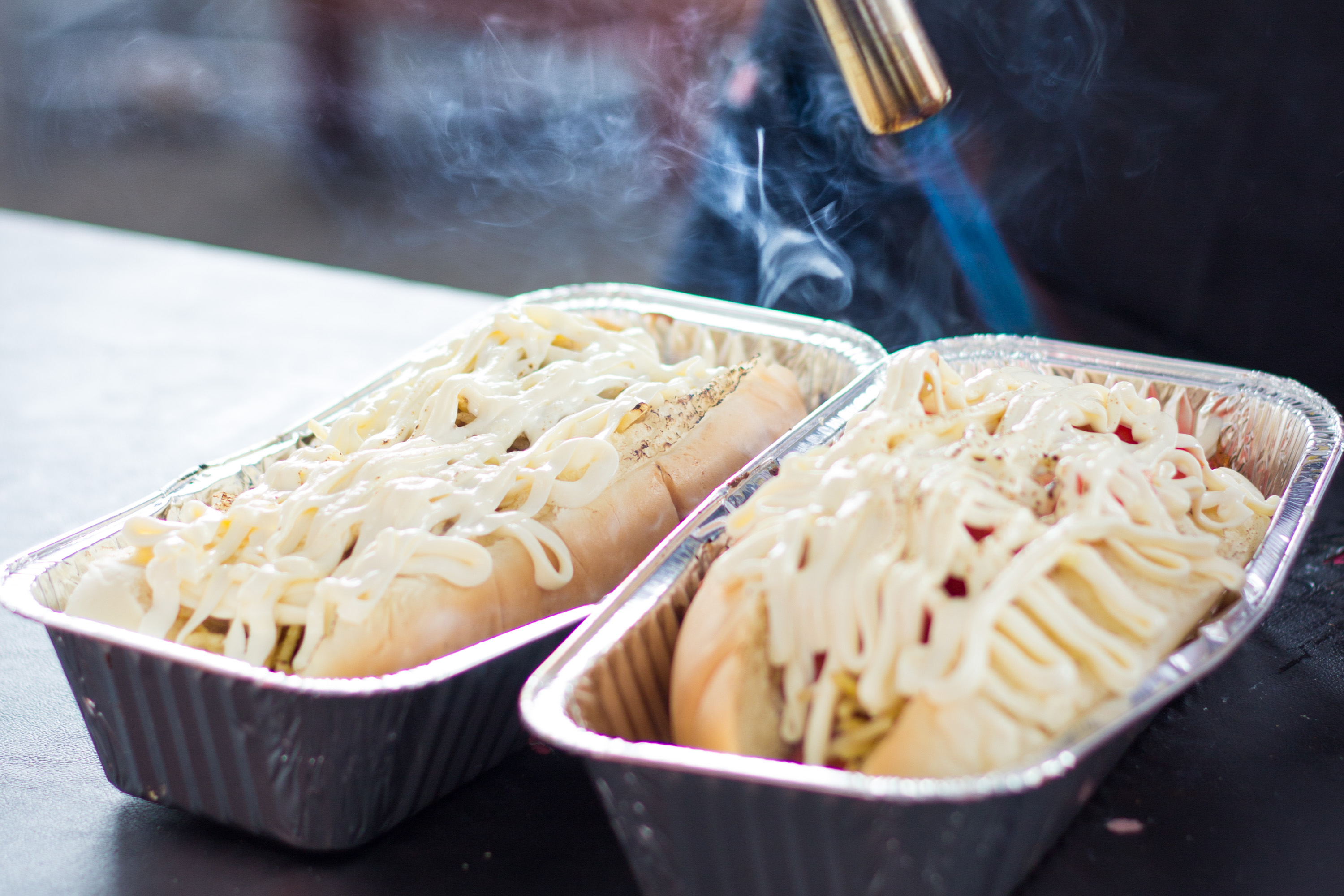
Hot dogs with a topping of shoestring fries and catupiry being torched in Paraguaçu Paulista

In the northeastern state of Bahia, the region's African heritage is reflected in the iconic acarajé (deep fried black eyed pea bun filled with caruru, made from salted dried shrimp, and vatapá, a creamy combination of coconut milk, palm oil and cashew nuts) and sweets such as cocada (candied coconut) and pé-de-moleque (peanut brittle).

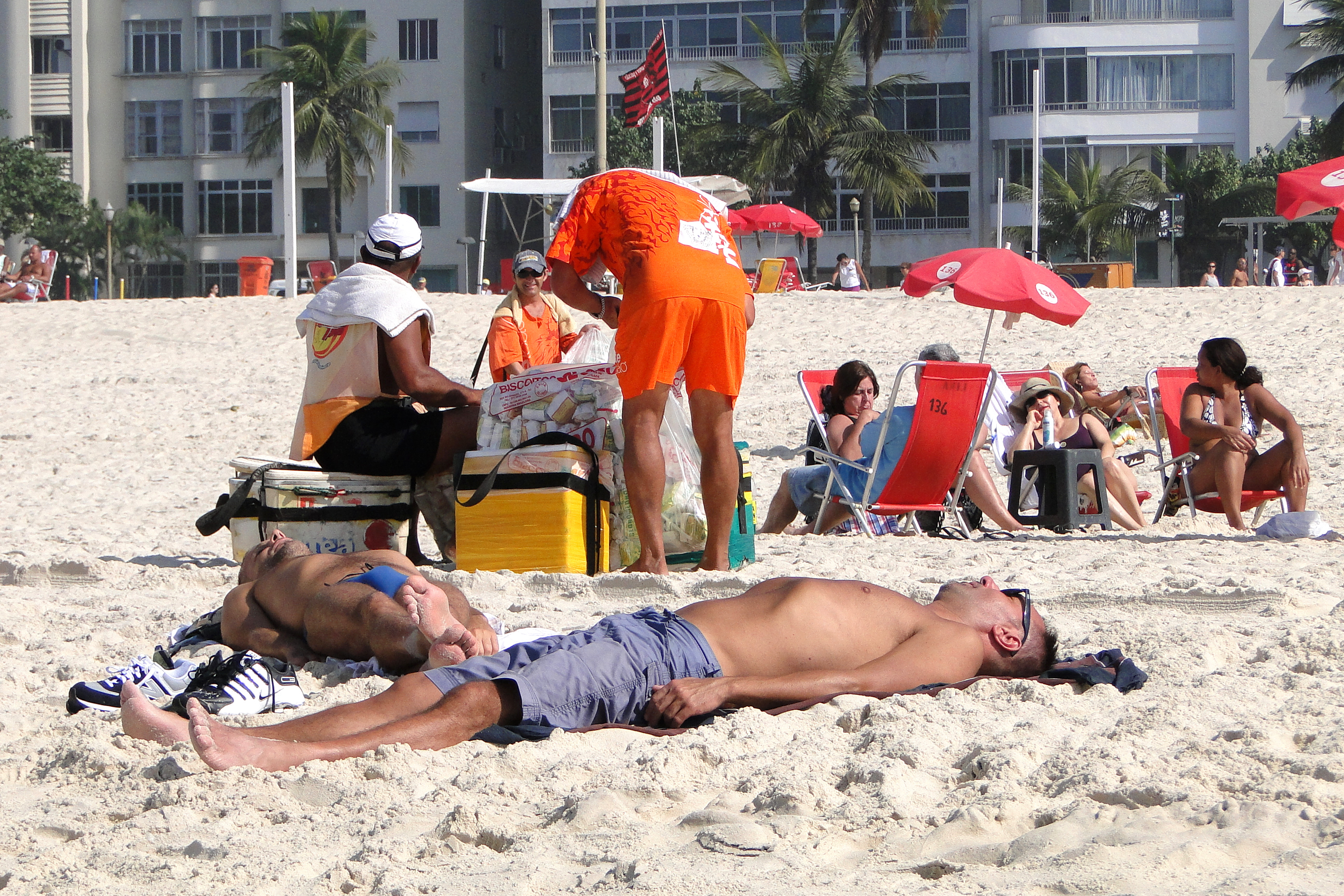
A beach vendor of Biscoito Globo and Matte Leão, at Copacabana beach

Rio de Janeiro beach vendors sell Mate Gelado (erva mate iced-tea), biscoitos de polvilho (sour manioc flour puffs), empadas or empadinhas (a smaller version of a chicken pie, but with fillings ranging from chicken, cheese, shrimp and such), roasted peanuts and queijo coalho (grilled cheese on sticks, barbecued on the spot), as well as popsicles (and the sacolé variant), cold beer, esfirras and home-made sandwiches (sanduíche natural).

Due to health concerns, the city of Rio de Janeiro prohibited in 2009 the sale of many beloved foods such as queijo coalho, shrimp skewers, caipirinha and churrasco. It was argued that the careless disposal of charcoal on beaches would often harm children and the elderly, and that the uncertain precedence of certain items could impose a health risk. Beach vendors, however, have not refrained from selling those items. Other cities have since followed the lead, and have also banned the usage of grills for beach vendors.

==== Chile ====
In Chile, the street cart menus tend to include: sopaipillas (a deep fried dough made out of flour and pumpkin), Anticucho (a type of kebab), completo (local version of hot dog, usually topped with mayonnaise, chopped tomatoes and sauerkraut), calzones rotos (sweet deep-fried dough with pulverized sugar sprinkled on top), fresh fruit juices (preferentially orange or grapefruit), fruit salads, soft drinks, French fries, pizza, churros, empanadas (either fried ones filled with cheese or baked ones filled with minced meat, black olives and hard-boiled eggs), savory or caramelized peanuts, local sweets and others.

==== Colombia ====
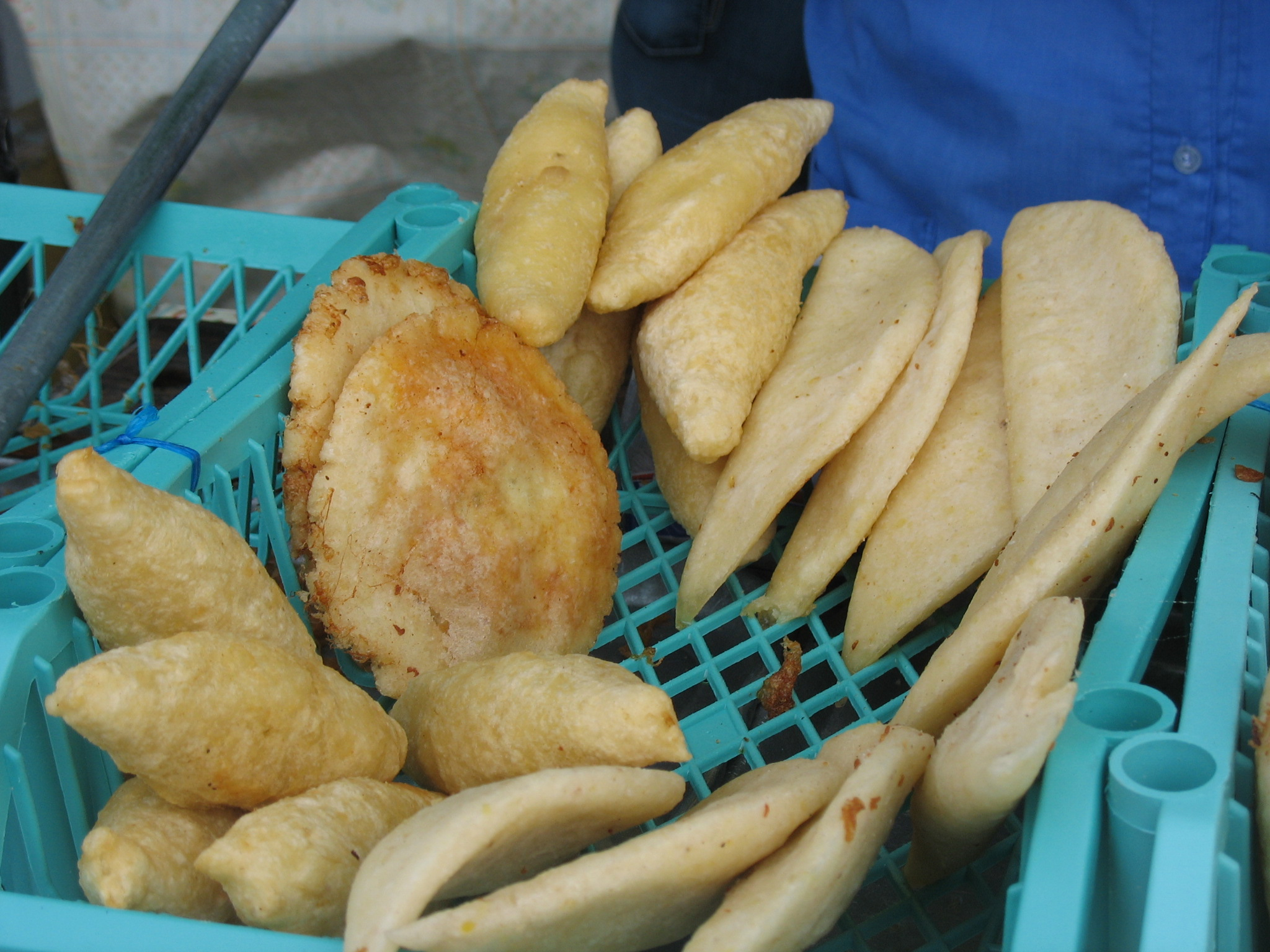
Carimañolas, empanadas, arepas and egg filled arepas

In Colombia, the empanada, a deep-fried meat-filled patty, is sold. It is also a very popular side dish. Various types of arepa are also a common street food. Also popular is the chuzo (meat skewer), consisting of pork or chicken speared shish-kebab style on a thin wooden stake (hence the name chuzo, from chuzar meaning "to pierce or spear") and cooked over charcoal on a pushcart. Most chuzos are garnished with a small arepa at the top and a small roasted potato at the bottom. Morcilla, various sausages, chicharrón and chinchurria are also sold by street vendors.

A very common street treat is corn on the cob (mazorca) cooked over charcoal and buttered.

Lechona (roasted pig stuffed with yellow peas, green onion, yellow rice, and spices cooked in an outdoor brick oven for about ten hours) is sold in the vicinity of many marketplaces.

Mango Biche is green mango cut in slices or strings with salt, lime juice and/or adobo (spice mix).

Buñuelos and natilla are popular especially during the Christmas season.

In the Paisa Region, pan de bono, pan de yuca, pan de queso, pastries and wine cake are sold at street stalls. Ice cream treats and paletas are also popular at street vendors. Fruit salad with condensed milk, granizado shakes, salpicon, and fresh fruit are also sold in the land of "eternal spring". Carimañolas, butifarra (Butifarra Soledeñas), arepas de huevo (Deep-fried egg filled arepa) and cocadas are sold in coastal regions. Also Almojábana, pastel de yuca (deep-fried rice and meat filled cassava patty) are commonly sold on the streets of Bogotá.

==== Peru ====
In Peru, anticuchos, a type of kebab, are often sold by street vendors called anticucheras. Also, cuy, a species of Guinea pig, is served as a delicacy on religious holidays.

==== Venezuela ====
In Venezuela, the arepa is a common fast-food meal. It consists of a flattened cornmeal bun, about the size and shape of an English muffin, split open and usually stuffed with soft cheese. Other fillings include shredded chicken salad with mayonnaise and avocado (reina pepiada), shredded brisket cooked with onions, red bell peppers and tomatoes (carne mechada) and pickled octopus. Also popular are cachapas, flat cakes made from fresh corn, rather than corn flour. Empanadas are also eaten in Venezuela, and are made out of corn flour, rather than wheat flour, as in the rest of the continent. They are filled with the same ingredients as arepas.

== See also ==
- Street foods
- List of snack foods
- List of food trucks
