= Herring as food =

Type of fish used as food for humans

Baked herring with potatoes

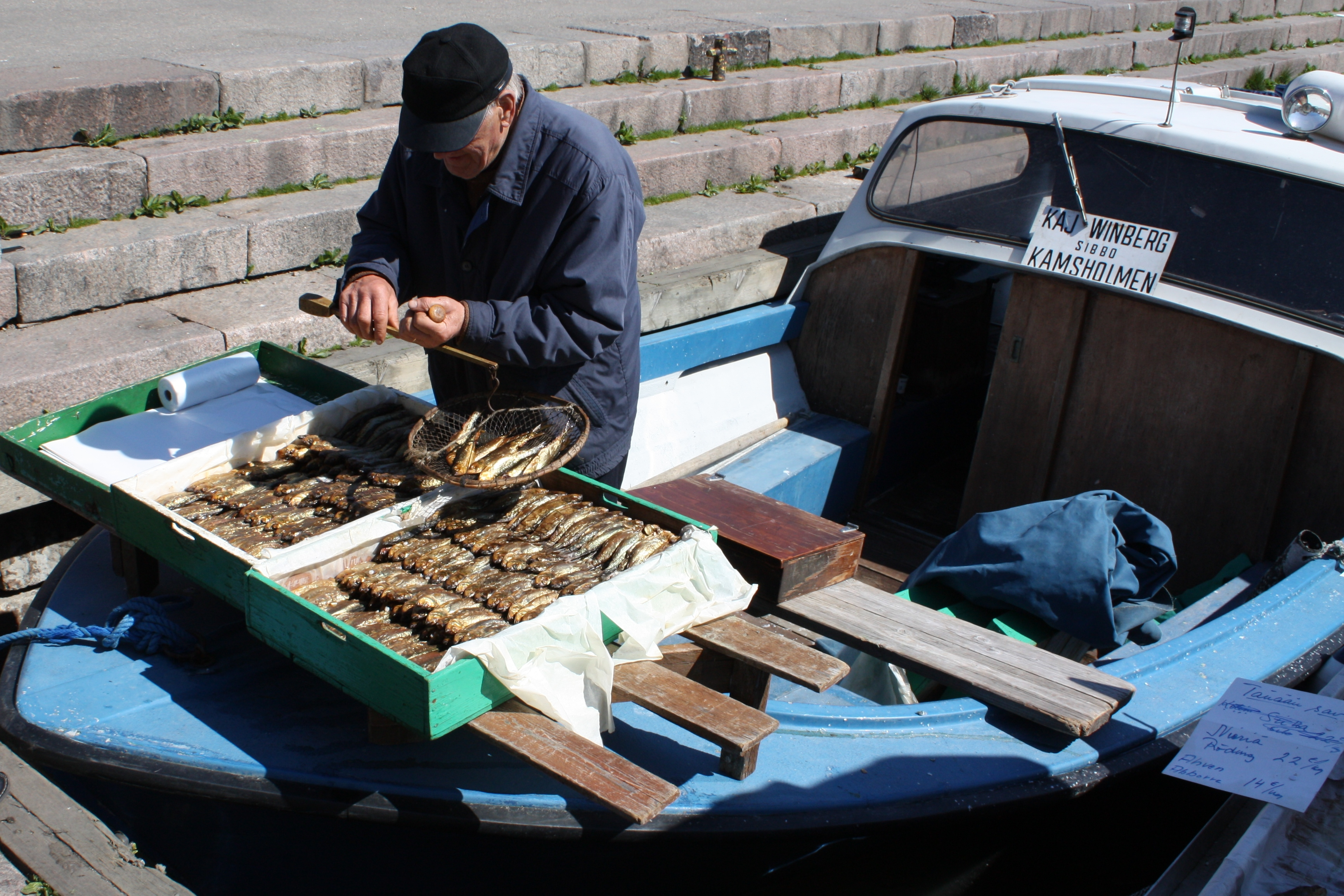
Fisherman selling smoked herring

Herring are forage fish in the wild, mostly belonging to the family Clupeidae. They are an important food for humans. Herring often move in large schools around fishing banks and near the coast. The most abundant and commercially important species belong to the genus Clupea, found particularly in shallow, temperate waters of the North Pacific and North Atlantic Oceans, including the Baltic Sea, as well as off the west coast of South America. Three species of Clupea are recognized; the main taxon, the Atlantic herring, accounts for over half the world's commercial capture of herrings.

Herrings played a pivotal role in the history of marine fisheries in Europe, and early in the twentieth century, their study was fundamental to the evolution of fisheries science. These oily fish also have a long history as an important food fish, and are often salted, smoked, or pickled.

== Nutrition ==
Atlantic herring, raw
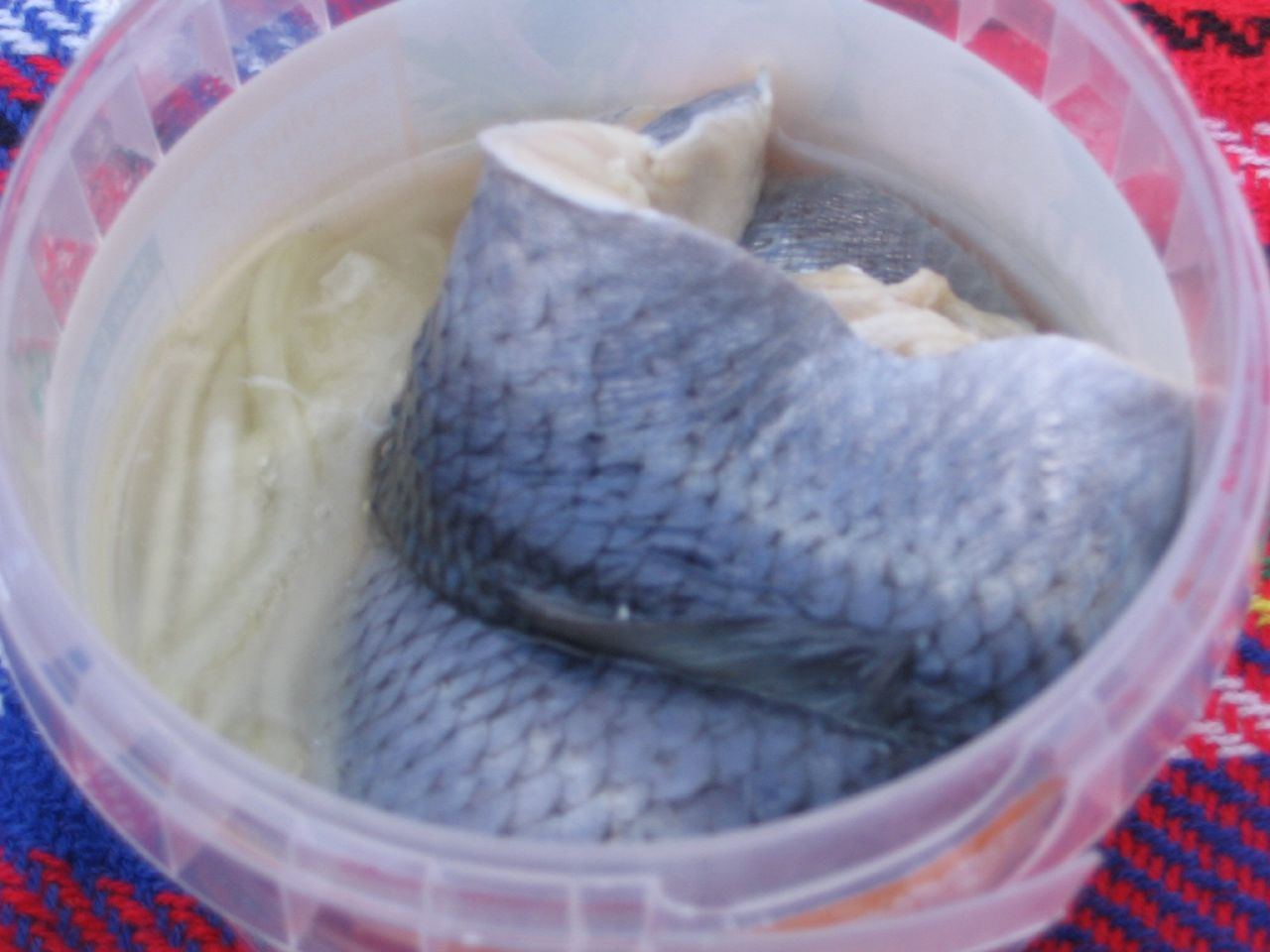

Nutritional value per 100 g (3.5 oz)
- Energy: 661 kJ (158 kcal)
- Carbohydrates: 0.0 g
- Sugars: 0.00
- Dietary fiber: 0.0 g
- Fat: 9.04 g
- Protein: 17.96 g
Vitamins and minerals
Vitamins	Quantity %DV^{†}
Thiamine (B1)	8% 0.092 mg
Riboflavin (B2)	18% 0.233 mg
Niacin (B3)	20% 3.217 mg
Pantothenic acid (B5)	13% 0.645 mg
Vitamin B6	18% 0.302 mg
Folate (B9)	3% 10 μg
Vitamin B12	570% 13.67 μg
Vitamin C	1% 0.7 mg
Vitamin D	21% 167 IU
Vitamin E	7% 1.07 mg
Minerals	Quantity %DV^{†}
Calcium	4% 57 mg
Iron	6% 1.10 mg
Magnesium	8% 32 mg
Manganese	2% 0.035 mg
Phosphorus	19% 236 mg
Potassium	11% 327 mg
Sodium	4% 90 mg
Zinc	9% 0.99 mg
- Other constituents: Quantity
- Water: 72 g
- Link to USDA Database entry
- ^{†}Percentages estimated using US recommendations for adults, except for potassium, which is estimated based on expert recommendation from the National Academies.

Raw Atlantic herring is 72% water, 18% protein, 9% fat, and contains no carbohydrates. In a 100 gram reference amount, raw herring provides 158 calories, and is a highly rich source (20% or more of the Daily Value, DV) of vitamin B_{12} (570% DV). It also has rich content of niacin, vitamin B_{6}, vitamin D, and phosphorus (21-34% DV). Raw herring contains moderate amounts of other B vitamins and zinc, and is an excellent food source of omega-3 fatty acids.

=== Contamination ===
Pacific and Atlantic herring are susceptible to contamination from environmental pollution, such as by PCBs, PBDEs, mercury, and listeria. There is a (rare) risk of harmful bacteria from eating raw herring eggs.

According to NSW Food Authority, herrings have low mercury levels.

== Preparation ==
Herring has been a staple food source since at least 3000 BC. There are numerous ways the fish is served and many regional recipes: eaten raw, fermented, pickled, or cured by other techniques.

=== Canned ===
Herrings can be canned. The canning process involves cleaning and cutting the fish into pieces, then submerging them in a brine to preserve them and prevent bacterial growth. The fish are then heated, vacuum sealed and cooled down. This process allows herrings to be safely stored without refrigeration and eaten straight from the can.

=== Raw ===
A typical Dutch delicacy is Hollandse Nieuwe (Dutch New), which is raw herring from the catches around the end of spring and the beginning of summer. This is typically eaten with raw onion. Hollandse nieuwe is only available in spring when the first seasonal catch of herring is brought in. This is celebrated in festivals such as the Vlaardingen Herring Festival and Vlaggetjesdag in Scheveningen. The new herring are frozen and enzyme-preserved for the remainder of the year. The herring is said to be eaten "raw" because it has not been cooked, although it has been subjected to a degree of curing. The first barrel of Hollandse Nieuwe is traditionally sold at auction for charity. Very young herring are called whitebait and are eaten whole as a delicacy.

=== Salted ===
In Norway, salting herring is a significant business. Herring was traditionally salted in wooden barrels and constituted a significant food resource. Salted herring is the basis for a number of herring dishes, as spekesild.

=== Fermented ===
In Sweden, Baltic herring ("Strömming") is fermented to make surströmming.

=== Pickled ===
Pickled herrings are part of German (Bismarckhering), Nordic, British, Canadian, Dutch, Polish, Baltic and Jewish cuisine. Most herring cures use a two-step process. Initially, the herrings are cured with salt to extract water. The second stage involves removing the salt and adding flavorings, typically a vinegar, salt, and sugar solution to which ingredients like peppercorn, bay leaves and raw onions are added. Other flavors can be added, such as sherry, mustard and dill. The tradition is strong in Scandinavia, the Netherlands, Poland, Iceland and Germany.

=== Dried ===
In the Philippines, dried herring is popularly eaten during breakfast, along with garlic rice and eggs.

=== Smoked ===
A kipper is a split, gutted and cold-smoked herring, a bloater is a whole non-gutted cold smoked herring, and a buckling is a whole herring, gutted apart from roe or milt and then hot-smoked. All are staples of British cuisine. According to George Orwell in The Road to Wigan Pier, Emperor Charles V erected a statue to the inventor of bloaters.

Smoked herring is a traditional meal on Bornholm. This is also the case in Sweden, where one can get hard-fried/smoked strömming, known as sotare, in places like Skansen, Stockholm.

=== Other ===
In Scotland, herrings are traditionally filleted, coated in seasoned pin-head oatmeal, and fried in a pan with butter or oil. This dish is usually served with "crushed", buttered, and boiled potatoes.

In Sweden, herring soup is a traditional dish.

In Southeast Alaska, western hemlock boughs are cut and placed in the ocean before the herring arrive to spawn. The fertilized herring eggs stick to the boughs, and are easily collected. After being boiled briefly the eggs are removed from the bough. Herring eggs collected in this way are eaten plain or in herring egg salad. This method of collection is part of Tlingit tradition.

== Foods and dishes ==
Herring dishes
Name	Image	Origin	Description
Avruga caviar		Spain	Avruga is marketed by the Spanish company Pescaviar as a caviar substitute. It is made from herring (40%), salt, corn starch, lemon juice, citric acid, xanthan gum, sodium benzoate, squid ink and water. Unlike caviar, it does not contain fish roe.
Bloater		England	Popular in the 19th and early 20th centuries, bloaters are now rare. They can be contrasted with kippers. Kippers are salted and cold-smoked overnight while bloaters are salted less and not smoked for so long. Kippers are split and gutted before smoking while bloaters are smoked whole without gutting. Kippers are associated with Scotland while bloaters are associated with England. Bloaters have their own characteristic slightly gamey flavor and are called "bloaters" because they swell or bloat during preparation.
Brathering		Germany	A dish of fried marinated herring. A common recipe starts with fresh herrings with the head and gut removed that are breaded or turned in flour, fried and then pickled in a marinade of vinegar. The pickled herrings are then boiled briefly in water containing onion, salt, spices like pepper, bay leaves, mustard seeds, and a little sugar. The herring are served cold with bread and fried or jacket potatoes.
Buckling		European	A hot-smoked herring similar to a kipper or bloater. The guts are removed but the roe or milt remain. Buckling is hot-smoked whole, as opposed to kippers which are split and gutted, and then cold smoked. Bucklings can be eaten hot or cold.
Dressed herring		Russia	A layered salad of diced salted herring covered with alternating layers of grated boiled vegetables (potato, carrot and beet root) and chopped onions. Optionally includes a layer of fresh grated apple. The final layer is beet root covered with mayonnaise, which gives the salad a rich purple color. Often decorated with grated boiled eggs. Popular in Russia and other countries of the former USSR, where it is traditional at New Year and Christmas celebrations. Also known as herring under a fur coat or just fur coat.
Eling		Suriname	Eling is smoked and salted herring (sometimes dried and salted), and is used in a variety of dishes in Suriname.
Fischbrötchen (lit. fish sandwich)		Germany	A sandwich or roll made with fish and onions, sometimes also made with remoulade and pickles. Most commonly made with bismarck herring or soused herring, and eaten in Northern Germany, due to the region's proximity to the North Sea and Baltic Sea.
Gibbing		Netherlands	
Gwamegi		Korea	
Herring noodle		Japan	Called Nishin-soba (にしん蕎麦)
Herring roe		Japan	Called Kazunoko (数の子). Usually, it is served as a part of Osechi in the Japanese new year.
Herring soup		Sweden	
Herring spawn		Japan	Called Komochi-Kombu (子持昆布). Usually, it is served as a part of sushi or chinmi.
Herring spawn		Japan	Called matsumae-duke (松前漬け)
Herring with mushrooms		Lithuania	Traditional Christmas Eve dish. Lithuanians have more than 100 different variations on how to prepare herring.
Kibinago		Japan	
Kipper		United Kingdom	A whole herring that has been split from tail to head, gutted, salted or pickled, and cold-smoked.
Pickled herring		Northern Europe	
Rollmops		Germany; Netherlands	Rollmops are pickled herring fillets, rolled into a cylindrical shape, often around a savoury filling. The filling usually consists of onion and sliced pickled gherkin. Rollmops are often skewered with a cocktail skewer. They are usually bought ready-to-eat, in jars or tubs. The brine additionally consists of water, white vinegar, and salt; it may also contain sugar or other sweetening agents, onion rings, peppercorns and mustard seeds.
Schmaltz herring		Ashkenazi Jews (Eastern Europe)	
Śledzie		Poland	Pickled herring with chopped onions, eggs peeled and chopped (hard-cooked), apple - lemon juice, sour cream, garlic, salt and pepper, added to herring and mixed well, Sprinkled with dill or parsley. Served with rye bread. It is also traditionally one of the twelve dishes served at Christmas Eve (Wigilia).
Solomon Gundy		Jamaica	
Soused herring		Netherlands	'Soused herring' is lightly brined raw herring, also known as "Hollandse nieuwe" in the Netherlands. It is often eaten with small cubes of raw onion.
Spekesild		Norway	A traditional Norwegian dish with salted and filleted herring, often along with boiled potatoes, raw onions, pickled beets, butter and flatbrød. Spekesild is also the basis for several variants that are placed on top of bread slices in boneless slices, such as pickled herring (sursild), spicy herring (kryddersild), mustard herring (sennepsild) and tomato herring (tomatsild).
Surströmming		Sweden	
Vorschmack		Ashkenazi Jews (Eastern Europe)	Chopped herring salad
Herring tahini salad		Egypt	Herring salad with tahini, usually eaten during Egyptian spring festival Sham Ennessim

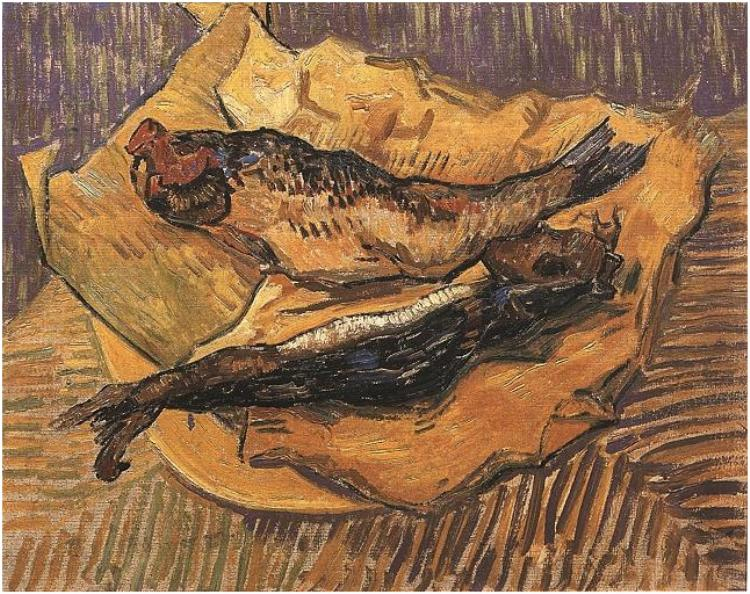
Bloaters on yellow paper, van Gogh, 1889

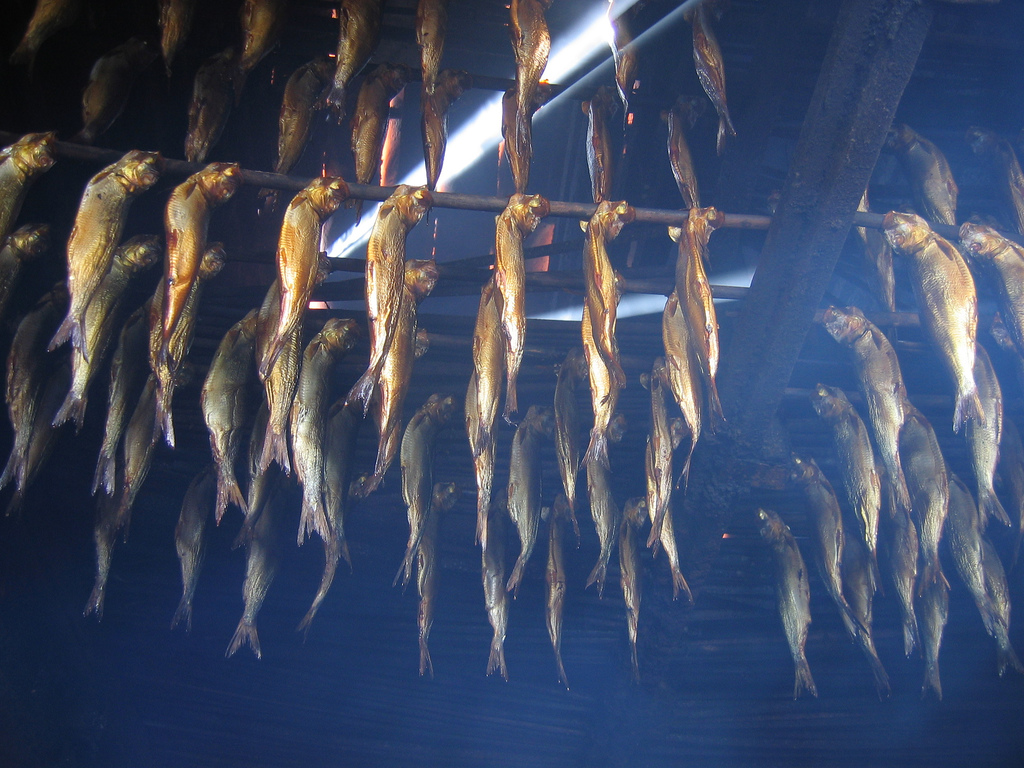
Smoked herring

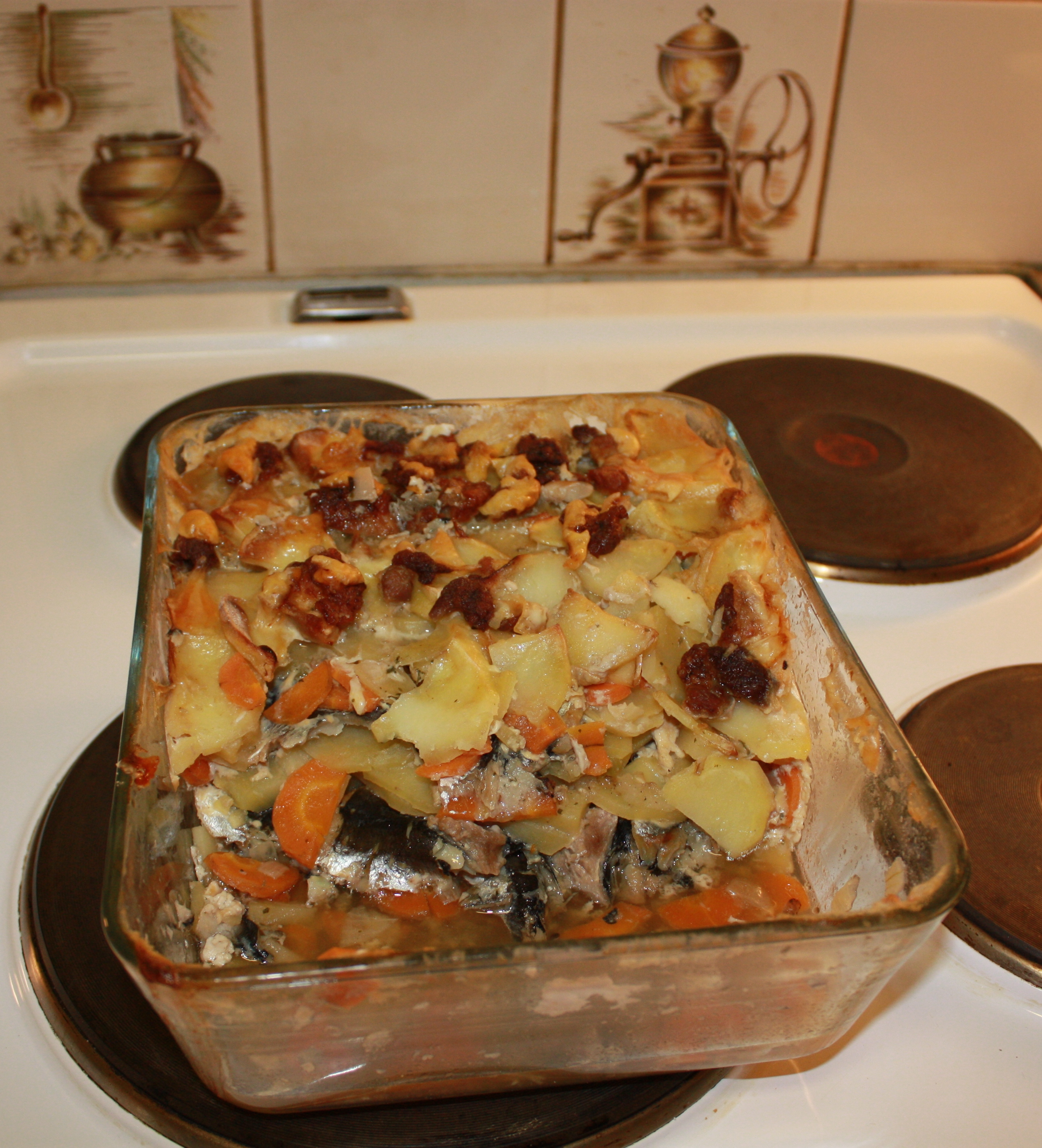
Traditional Finnish herring stew

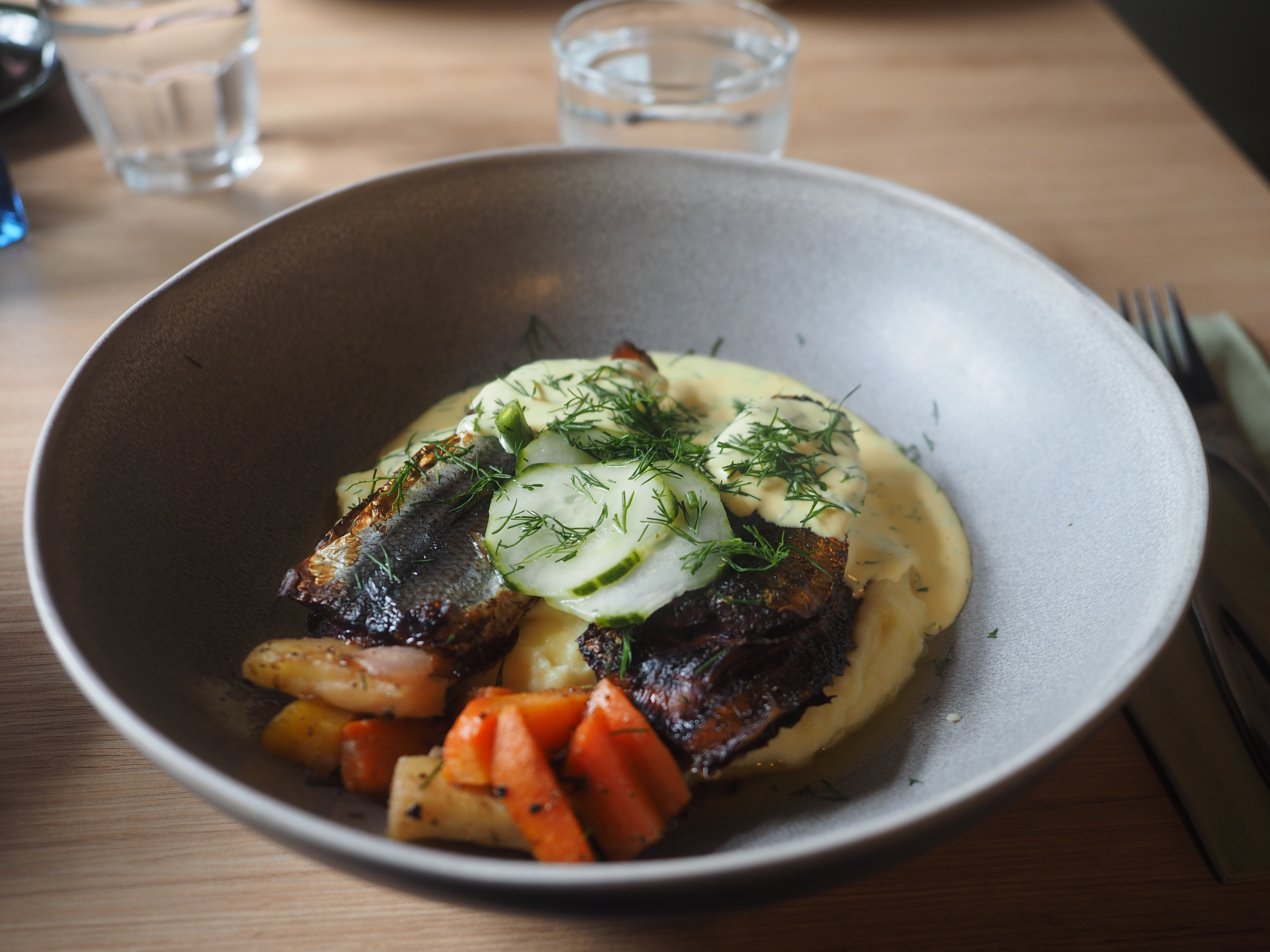
Steaks of Baltic herring is a typical dish in Finnish cuisine

== See also ==
- List of smoked foods
- Skåne Market
- Sardines as food
- Anchovies as food

== Other References ==
- Froese, Rainer; Pauly, Daniel (eds.). "Species in genus Clupea". FishBase. January 2006 version.
- O'Clair, Rita M. and O'Clair, Charles E., "Pacific herring," Southeast Alaska's Rocky Shores: Animals. pg. 343-346. Plant Press: Auke Bay, Alaska (1998). ISBN 0-9664245-0-6
