= Raskin's Fish Market =

Coordinates: 40.66805°N 73.9425°W

- Type: Private
- Industry: Kosher fish market
- Founded: 1961
- Founder: Berel Raskin
- Headquarters: Brooklyn, United States
- Products: Fresh fish, smoked fish, gefilte fish, herring
- Website: https://askin4raskin.com/

Raskin's Fish Market, is a Kosher fish market and wholesaler located at 320 Kingston Ave, Brooklyn, New York, United States. The market's stock of daily caught kosher fish includes salmon, snapper and dorade. Herring is offered in 20 varieties, including schmaltz, lightly salted, and others, it is available smoked, pickled, and creamed. The store's flagship product is frozen raw gefilte fish, sold internationally. Other products include canned fish, smoked fish, and fish marinades. Additional to the primary location, three other supermarkets operate, two in Brooklyn and one in Long Island. Raskin's fish counters can be found around tristate area.

== History ==
Raskin's is a family owned business started in 1961 by Berel Raskin (1934 - 2019). Berel, a member of Chabad Lubavich Chassidic community, asked the Lubavitcher Rebbe for a blessing for his business venture. Raskin recalled asking the Rebbe for a blessing, the Rebbe laughed and replied "Vos veistu fun fish?" — "What do you know about fish?" before giving him a blessing. The market is located blocks from the Chabad headquarters at 770 Eastern Parkway, it became a community staple, and supplied fish to the Rebbe and his wife, Rebbetzin Chaya Mushka.

On October 25, 2020, an electric fire broke out in the basement of Raskin's, the fire caused extensive damage to the basement and shop, no injuries were reported.
