= Nanbanzuke =

Japanese fish dish

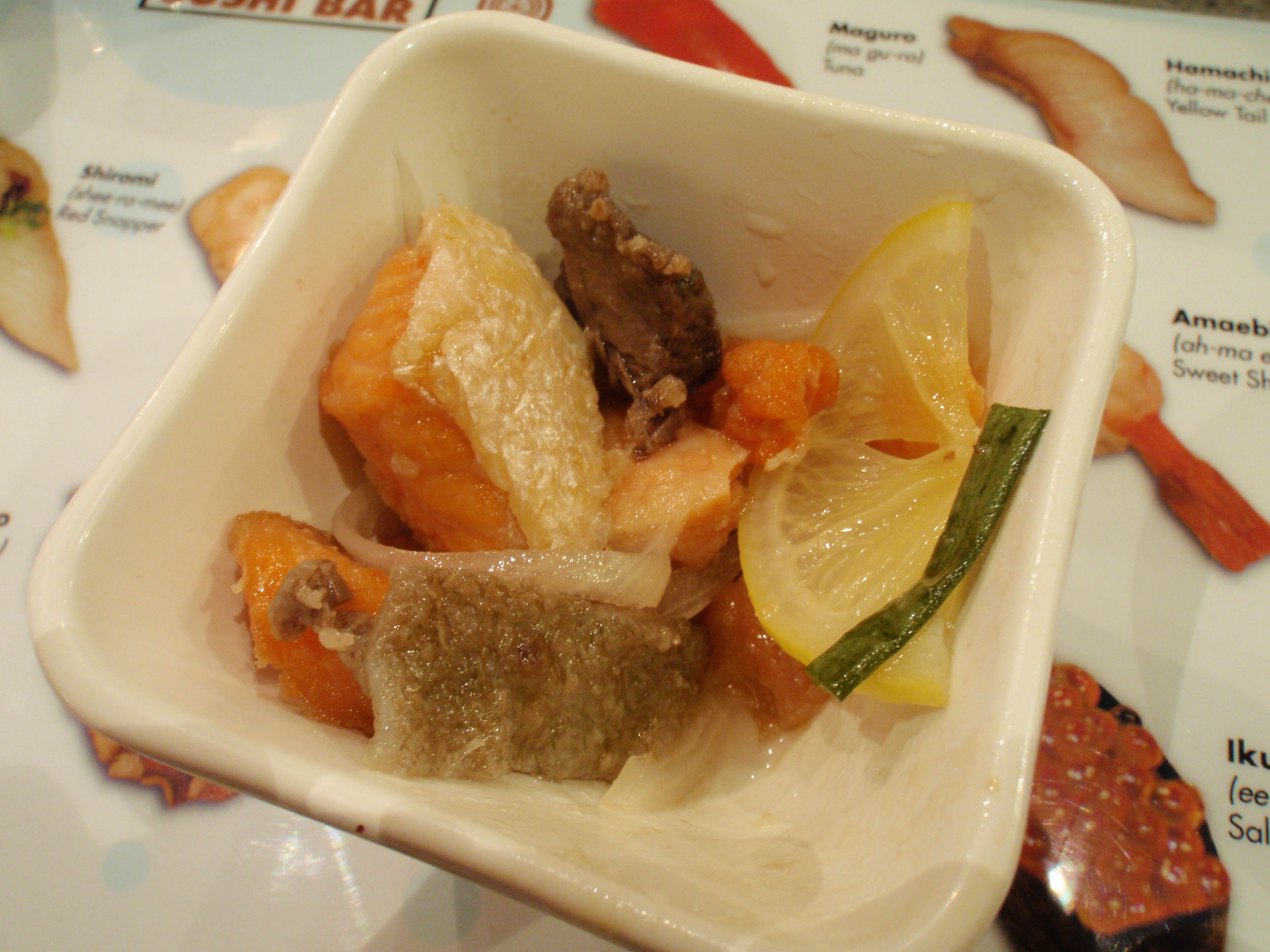
Salmon nanbanzuke

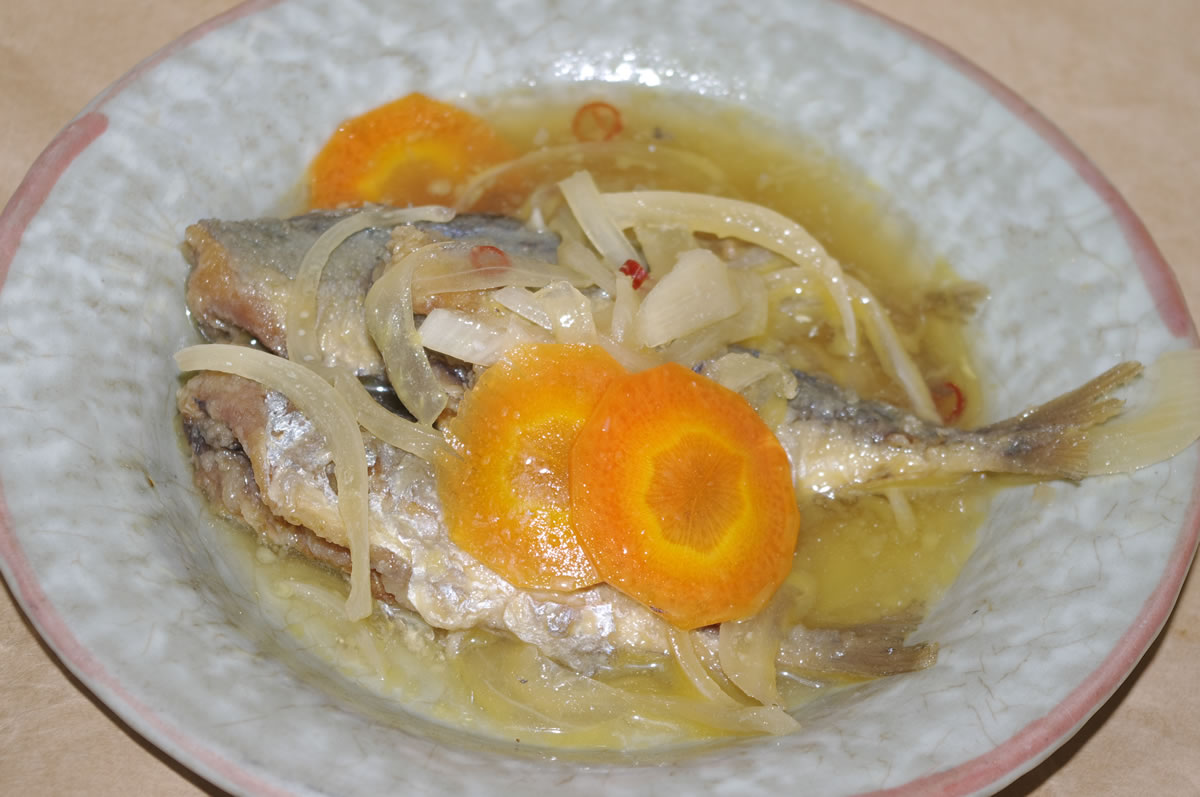
Japanese jack mackerel nanbanzuke

Nanbanzuke or nanban-zuke (Japanese: 南蛮漬け, literally "southern barbarian pickle (marinade)") is a Japanese fried and pickled seafood dish, introduced by Portuguese merchants and missionaries in Nagasaki, during the Sengoku period, and later adopted by the locals into the Japanese cuisine. It is sometimes translated as ‘Japanese escabèche’, with its origins in Portuguese escabeche.

To prepare it, the small fish (often Japanese jack mackerel or wakasagi smelt) (sprat) or diced fish (salmon, trout, sea bass, ocean perch, cod, haddock, pollock, hake, plaice, and monkfish) is lightly dusted with potato starch or cornstarch and then deep-fried until golden brown. It is then served in a hot broth (nanbanzu 南蛮酢, or tosazu 土佐酢) made of grain vinegar, dashi, mirin, and shō-yu (Japanese soy sauce), with finely sliced onion, finely julienned carrots, finely shredded green peppers, and red chilli peppers.

== See also ==
- Marinade
- Brathering
