= Soused herring =

Dish of raw herring pickled in vinegar

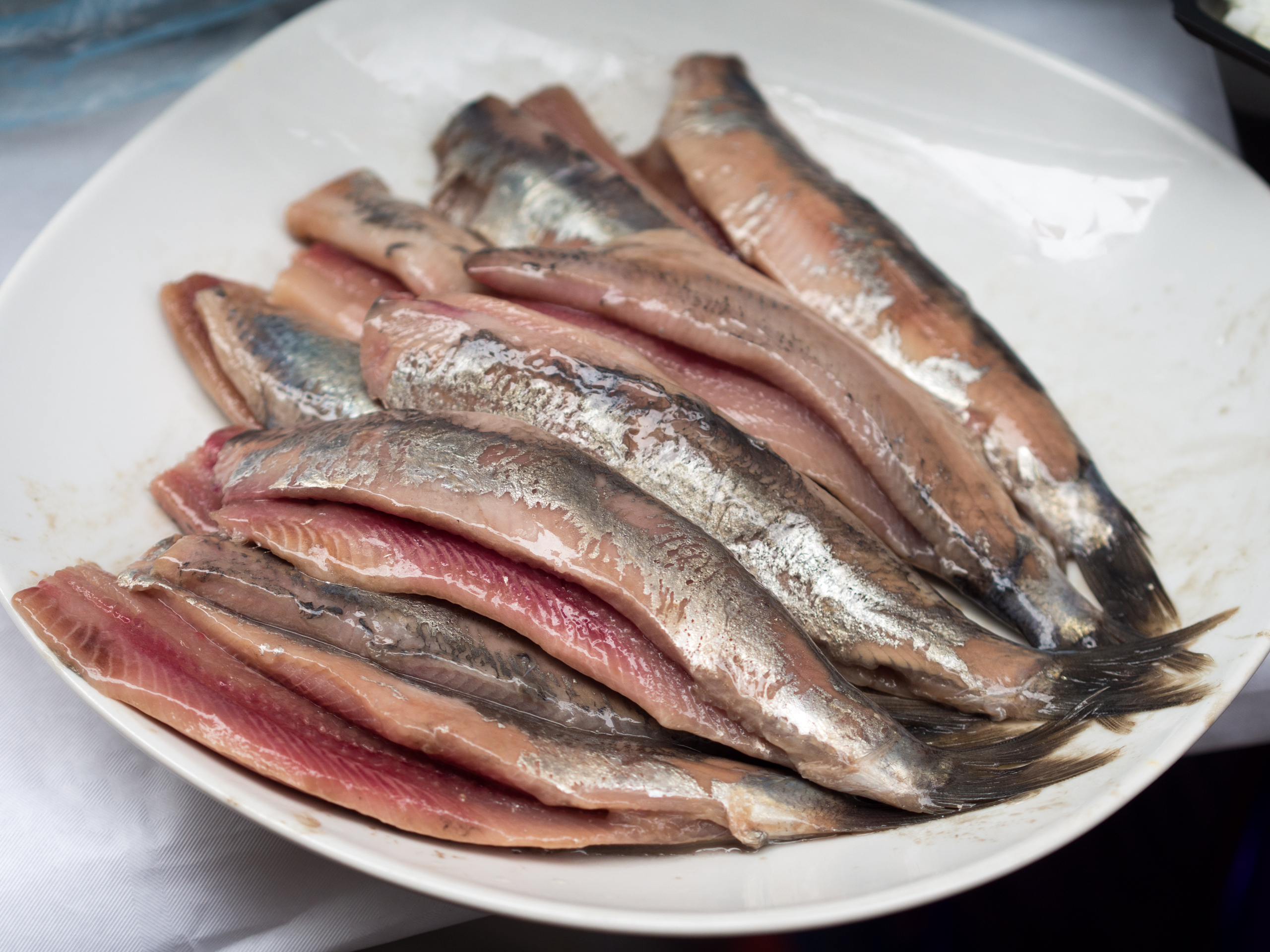
- Lightly brined raw herring, also known as Hollandse nieuwe in the Netherlands
- Place of origin: Netherlands
- Main ingredients: Herring, vinegar; any of cider, wine, tea, sugar, herbs (usually bay leaf), spices (usually mace), chopped onion

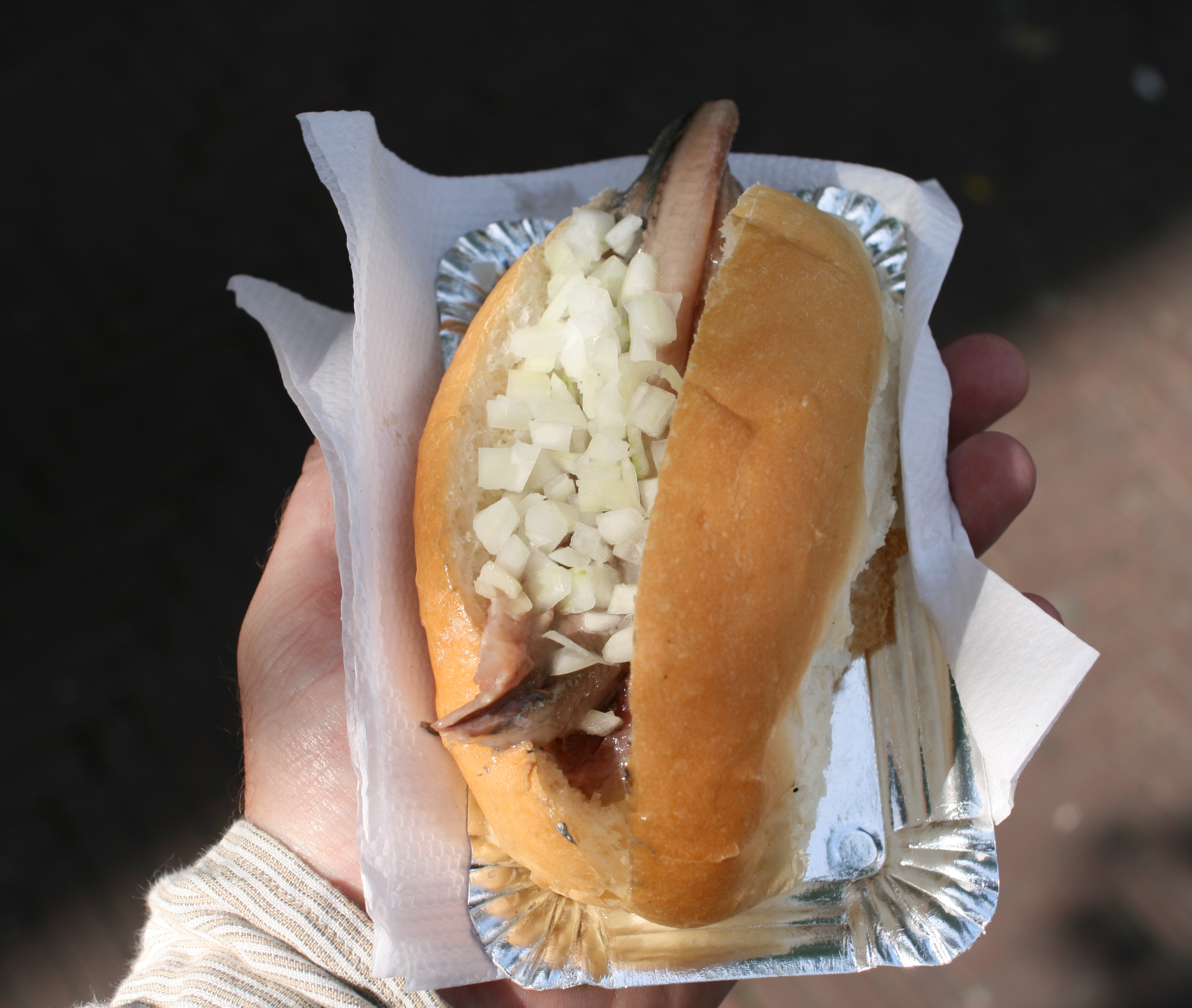
Herring sandwich served in the Netherlands

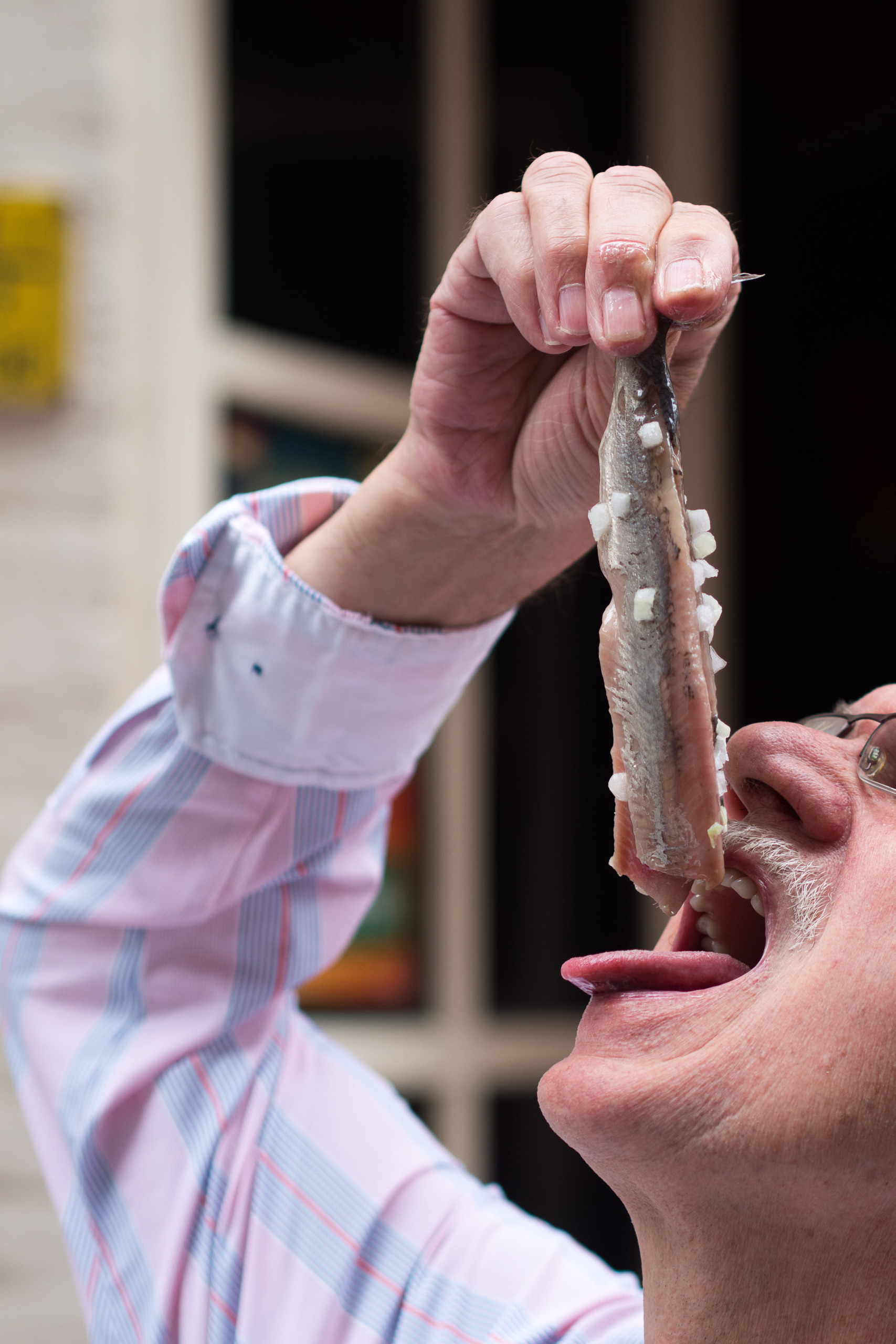
Maatjesharing eaten "the Dutch way"

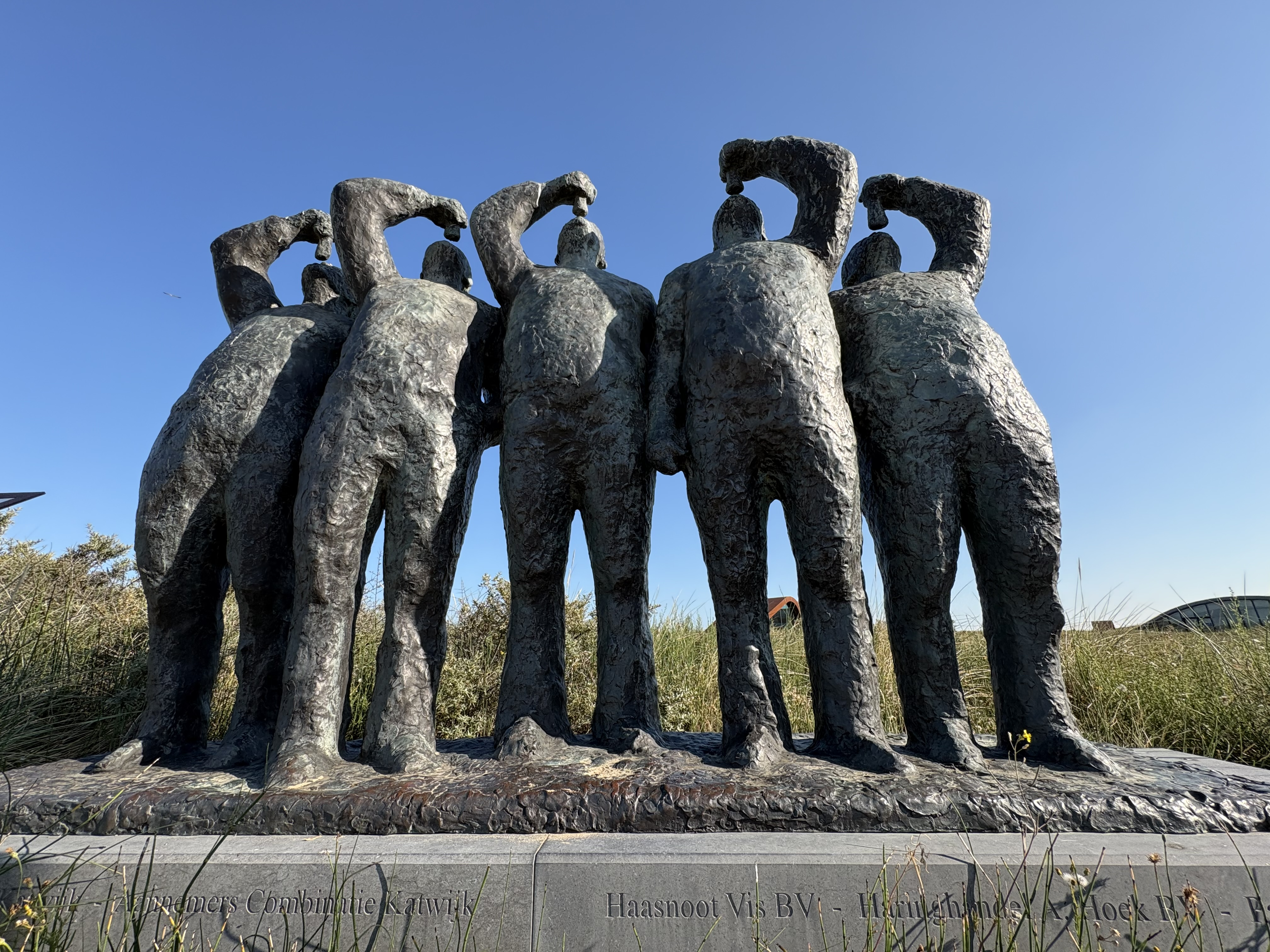
Maatjesharing monument in Katwijk

Soused herring is raw herring (a variety of fish) soaked in a mild preserving liquid. It usually consists of raw herring in a mild vinegar pickle or Dutch brined herring. As well as vinegar, the marinade might contain cider, wine or tea, sugar, herbs (usually bay leaf), spices (usually mace), and chopped onion.

The word 'soused' can also describe a marinated herring that has been cooked. The herring is usually baked in the marinade, although it is sometimes instead fried and then soaked in the marinade. Soused herring is served cold.

The soused herring (maatjesharing, although referred to as maatjes in Netherlands, or Matjes/matjes (in Germany and Sweden) is an especially mild salt herring, made from immature herrings. The herrings are ripened for a couple of days in oak barrels in a salty solution, or brine. The pancreatic enzymes which support the ripening make this version of salt herring especially mild and soft. Raw herrings pickled in vinegar are called rollmops.

Dutch-made Hollandse Nieuwe, Holländischer Matjes and Hollandse maatjesharing have TSG Certification within the European Union, and German-produced Glückstädter Matjes, produced in Schleswig-Holstein, has PGI certification.

== History ==
This process of preparing herring (known as "gibbing") was developed in the Middle Ages by the Dutch. Herrings are caught between the end of May and the beginning of July in the North Sea near Denmark or Norway, before the breeding season starts. This is because herrings at this time are richer in oils (over 15%) and their roe and milt have not started to develop.

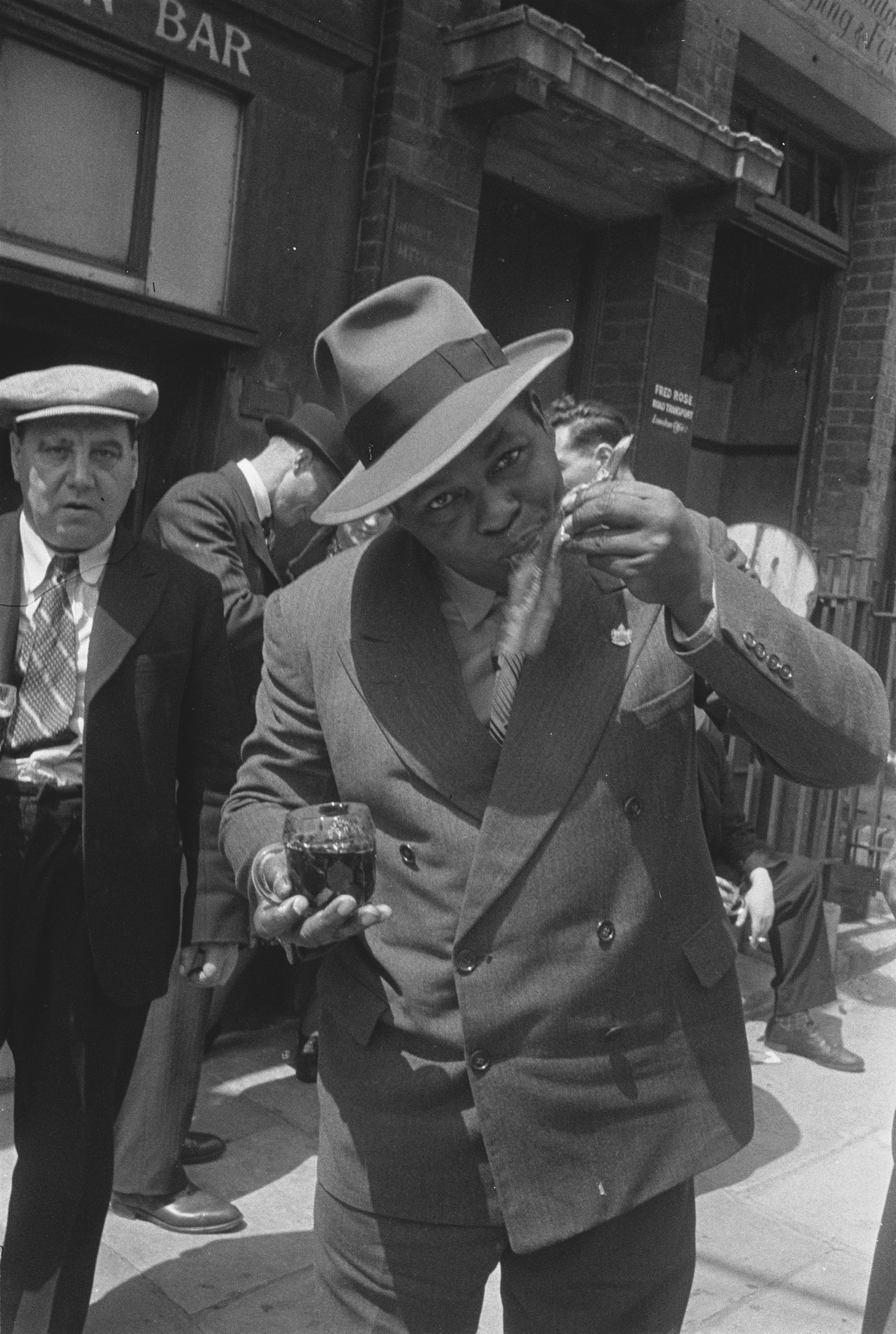
A Dutch merchant seaman eating maatjesharing in London, June 1943

The brine used for Dutch soused herring has a much lower salt content and is much milder in taste than the German Loggermatjes. To protect against infection by nematodes of the genus Anisakis, European Union regulations state that fish should be frozen at −20 °C for at least 24 hours. In the modern day, soused herrings can therefore be produced throughout the year.

The Dutch newspaper Algemeen Dagblad has for more than thirty years organized a competition whereby the quality of soused herring was evaluated. In 2017, there was a controversy over this competition, as an economist produced two working papers accusing the newspaper of biased testing. As a consequence, the competition was discontinued. Subsequently, statisticians have argued that the economist's claims relied on questionable statistics.

== Preparation ==
Through a cut in the throat, the gills and part of the gullet are removed from the herring, eliminating any bitter taste. The liver and pancreas are left in the fish during the salt-curing process because they release enzymes essential for flavor. The herrings are then placed in the brine for approximately five days, traditionally in oak casks. They require no further preparation after fillet and skin removal and can be eaten as a snack with finely sliced raw onion and pickles.

As skin removal requires experience, fillets or double fillets should be attempted first. The soused herrings are silvery outside and pink inside when fresh, and should not be bought if they appear grey and oily.

Whereas salt herrings have a salt content of 20% and must be soaked in water before consumption, soused herrings do not need soaking.

== Serving ==
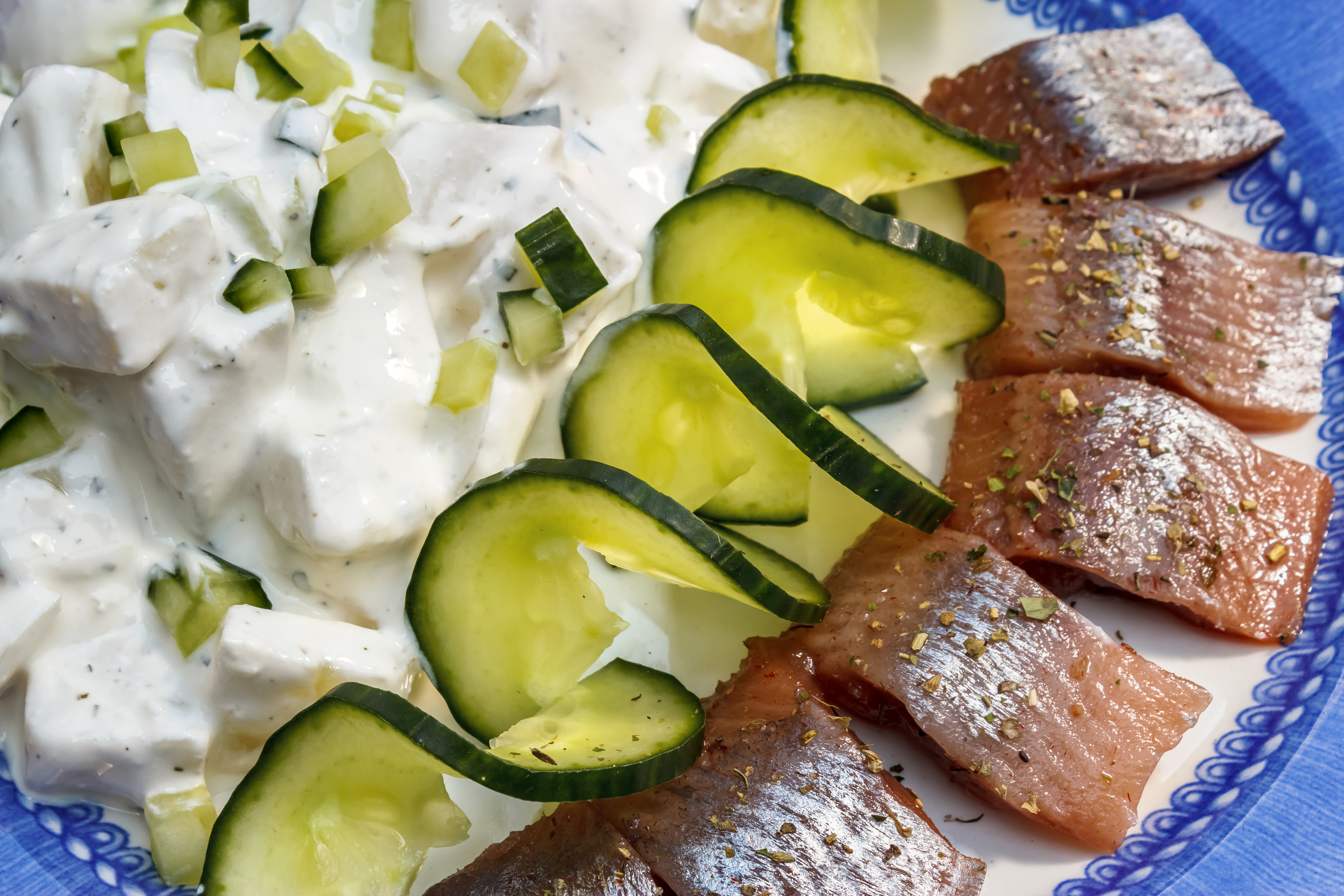
Swedish matjessill, served with sour cream potato salad and cucumber

In the Netherlands soused herring is most often served as a snack, most frequently plain, or with a garnish of diced raw onion. Whole herring is often eaten by lifting the herring by its tail and eating it upwards holding it over the mouth. Soused herring dishes in Northern Germany are traditionally served with potatoes boiled in their skins, French beans, finely sliced fried bacon and onion. It is also common in Germany to eat soused herring with sliced raw onion in a bread roll, in a dish called Matjesbrötchen.

In some regions (e. g. Holstein), it is served on dark bread with a cowberry and cream sauce. Soused herring can also be served with cream or yogurt sauces containing onions and gherkins, or in salads.

In Sweden matjessill is traditionally served with boiled potatoes, sour cream, chopped chives, crisp bread and snaps. Boiled eggs are popular together with this dish that is most traditionally served on Midsummer's Eve – Finland has a similar custom but silli is not associated with crisp bread. Nowadays most Swedes and Finns eat herring which comes in cans and are sliced and with added sugar. The Swedish matjessill is most often more strongly spiced than other varieties.

== See also ==
- Pickled herring
- Fischbrötchen
- Gwamegi
- Schmaltz herring
- Rollmops
- Sashimi
- Kinilaw
- Ceviche
