= Escabeche =

Ibero-American fish, meat or vegetable dish

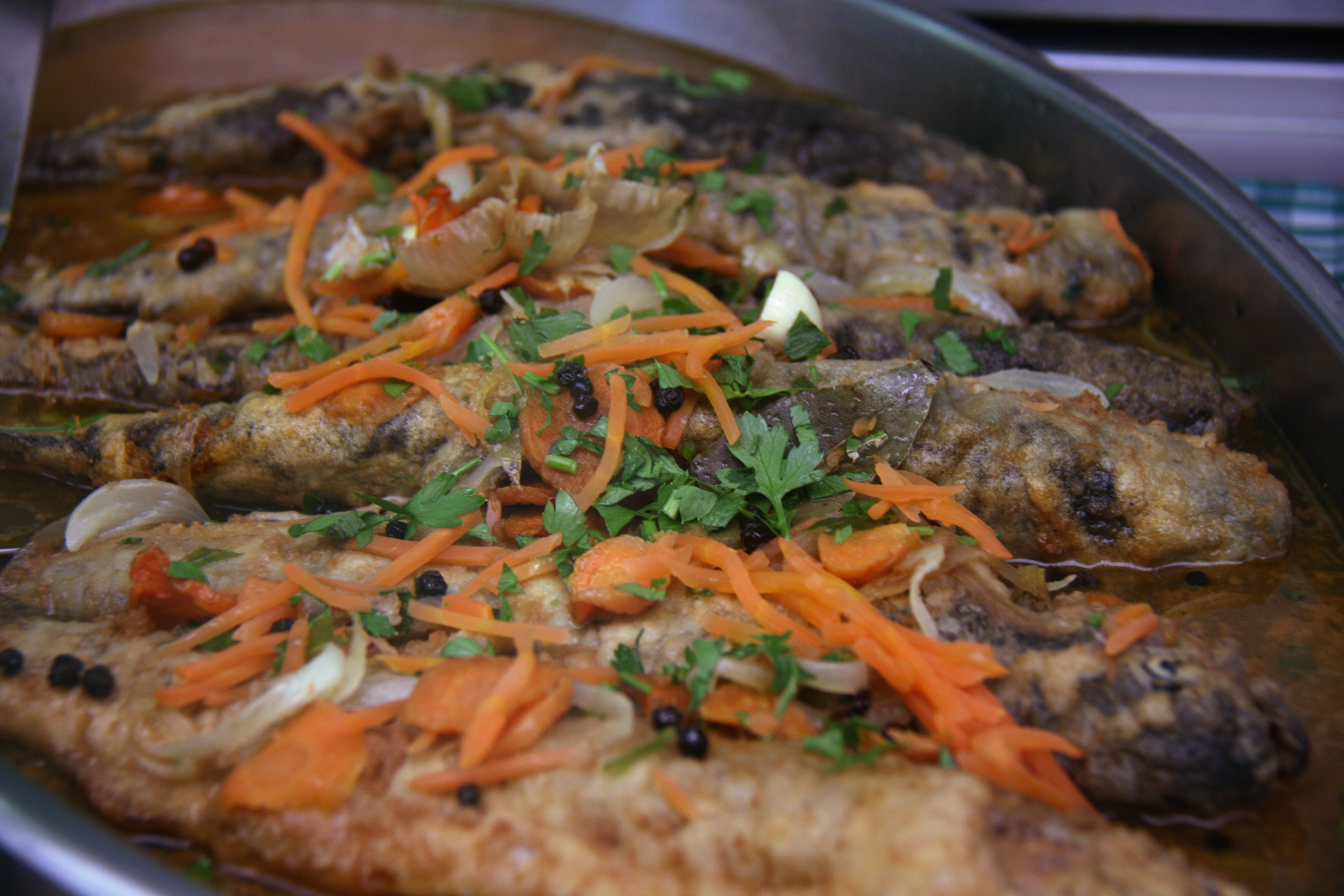
- Trout escabeche, from Spain
- Region or state: Mediterranean, Hispanic America, Caribbean, the Philippines, Guam
- Main ingredients: Fish, meat or vegetables
- Ingredients generally used: Vinegar, peppers and onions
- Variations: Brathering

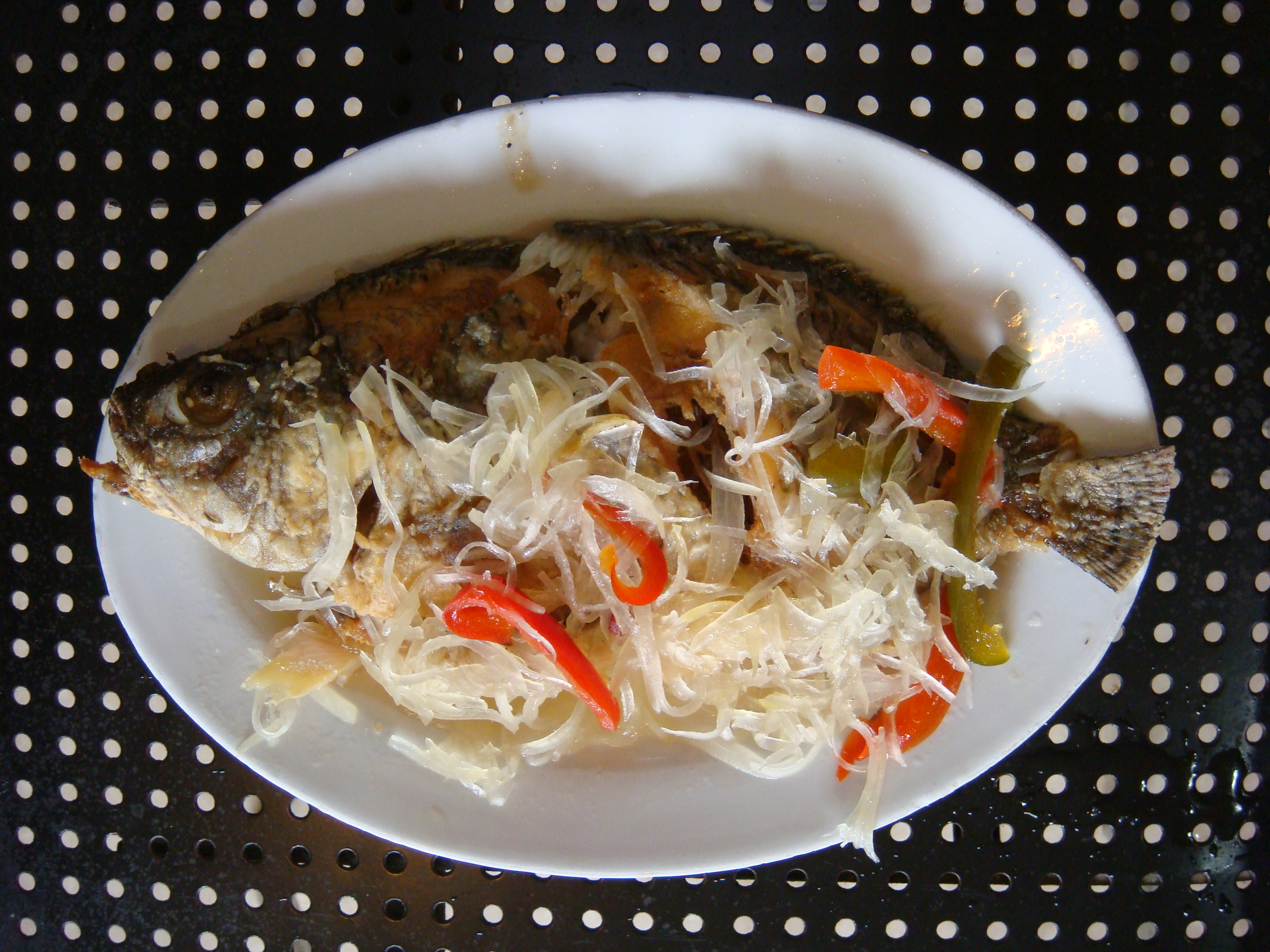
Escabeche of tilapia, from the Philippines

Escabeche is the name for several dishes in Spanish, French, Portuguese, Italian, Filipino and Hispanic American cuisines, consisting of marinated fish, meat or vegetables, cooked or pickled in an acidic sauce (usually with vinegar), and flavored with paprika, citrus, and other spices.

In Spain and throughout the Americas, many variations exist, including frying the main ingredient before marinating it. Escabeche of seafood, fish, chicken, rabbit, pork, and vegetables are common in Spain, the Caribbean and Portugal. Eggplant escabeche is common in Argentina.

== Terminology ==
The Spanish and Portuguese word escabeche originates from Andalusi Arabic (spoken in Muslim Iberia) es-scabéŷ (السّْكَبِاجْ), ultimately rooted in Persian skebaj/sikbaj (سكباج), the name of a popular meat dish cooked in a sweet-and-sour sauce, usually containing vinegar and honey or date molasses. This technique spread throughout the former Portuguese and Spanish Empires and is particularly common in Latin America and the Philippines.

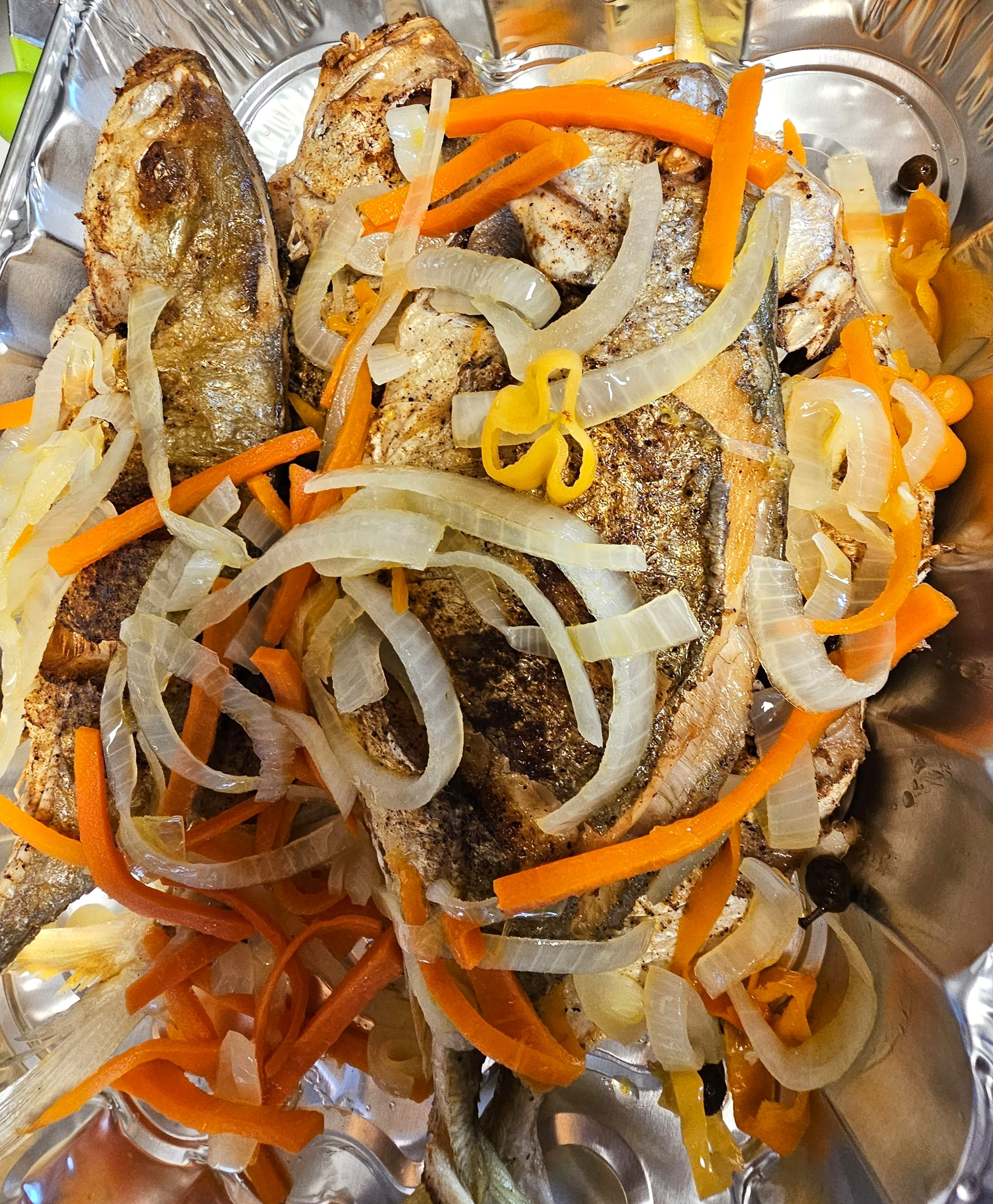
Escoveitch (escabeche) fish, from Jamaica

The dish, which was inherited from the Spanish and Portuguese during the colonial era, is known as escoveitch or escovitch fish in Jamaica. Fish and other seafood like shrimp and lobster are marinated in a sauce of vinegar, onions, carrots, chayote, pimento, and Scotch bonnet peppers. It is known as scapece or savoro in Italy, savoro in Greece (especially Ionian Islands), and scabetche in North Africa.

== Variations ==
Escabeche is common in Spain and has evolved with local modifications in the Spanish-speaking world. It is well represented in Portugal, frequently by the name molho à espanhola ("Spanish sauce"), usually spiced with peppercorns, chillies, peppers, onions, garlic and sliced carrots. The dish is popular in the Philippines and Guam, both former Spanish Viceroyalties, where it is similar to the original Spanish version, using locally available fish but respecting the original technique.

Also in Italy escabeche is also used and cooked; Scapece alla vastese is a traditional dish from the Abruzzo region of Italy. In its preparation mackerel and oily fish are used; then, once fried, the fish is immersed in vinegar and saffron which gives it the intense yellow color that characterizes it.

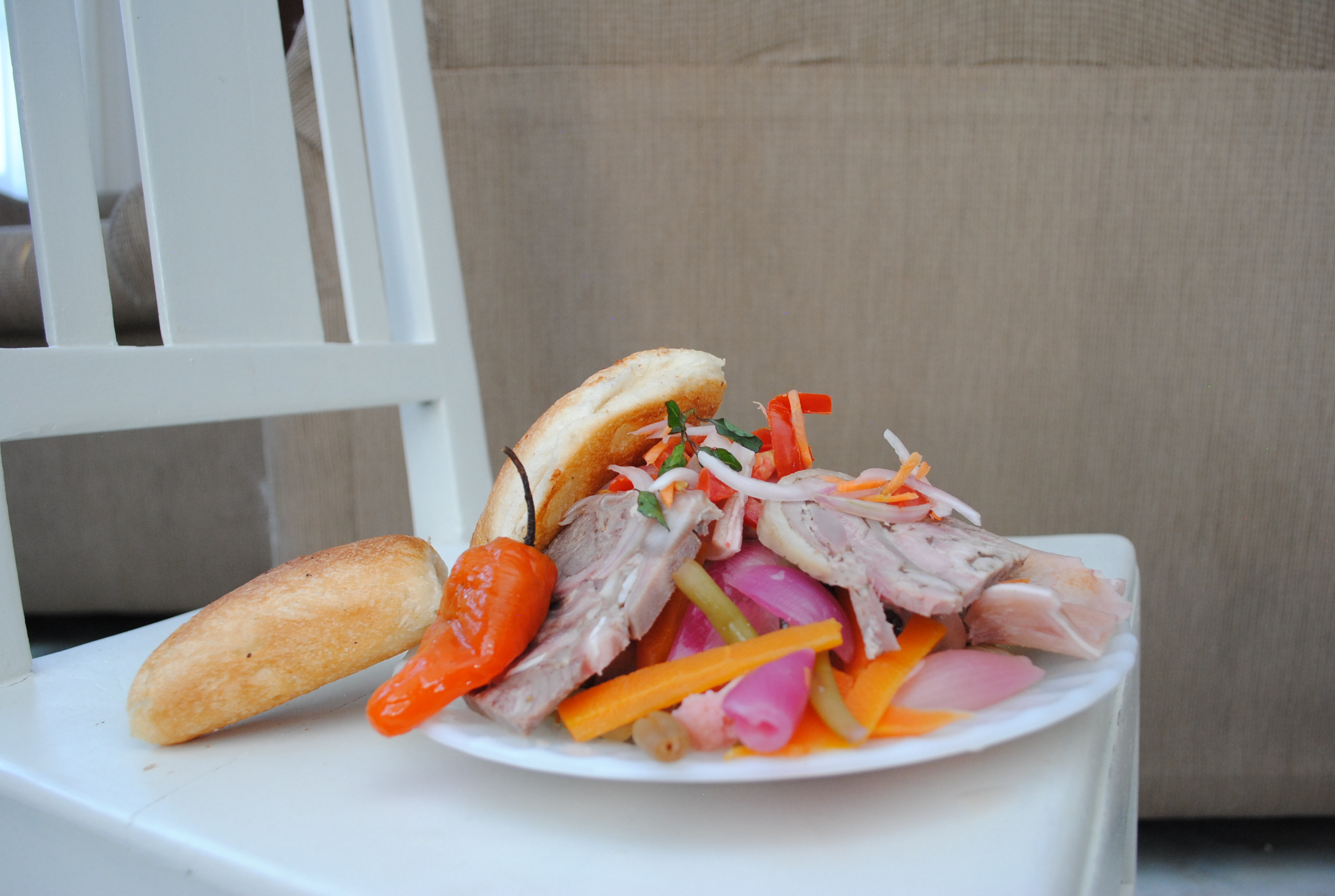
Pork escabeche from Bolivia

In international versions like in Peru, escabeche is usually poached or fried, then served cold after marinating in a refrigerator overnight or longer. The acid in the marinade is usually vinegar but can include citrus juice (a common conservation technique—a pH of 4 or lower effectively prevents decomposition). Escabeche is a popular presentation of canned or potted preserved fish, such as mackerel, tuna, bonito, or sardines.

Fish escabeche is also a Filipino cuisine version of sweet and sour fish. The dish is marinated in a fusion of ginger, vinegar-water, sugar, carrot, red bell pepper, ground pepper, and onion, and garnished with atchara. In José Rizal's July 1892 Dapitan exile, the letters in his novels mentioned fish escabeche as part of merienda cena, including tinolang manok, tsokolate, suman malagkit, tinagaktak, Leyte's salbero, and pan Bisaya.

In South Africa, a version of escabeche called either Kerrievis (curried fish) or Pickled Fish is made by the Cape Malay community. It's prepared by pickling hake, snoek or yellowtail, which had been previously battered and deep fried, in a curried sauce made with vinegar, sugar, onions, and Cape Malay spices.

== See also ==
- Arsik
- Brathering, a German version
- Ceviche, raw fish in an acidic marinade
- Kelaguen
- Nanbanzuke
