= Soused =

Soused may refer to:

- An informal term for being under the influence of alcohol intoxication
- Soused (album), by Sunn O))) in collaboration with Scott Walker

== See also ==
- Soused herring
- Souse (disambiguation)
