= Souse =

Souse may refer to:

- Head cheese, a terrine usually made from the head of a pig or calf and set in aspic
- A food that has been pickled
- A habitual drunkard

== See also ==
- Sousse, a city in Tunisia
- Soused (disambiguation)
