= Balık ekmek =

Fried or grilled fish in a bread loaf

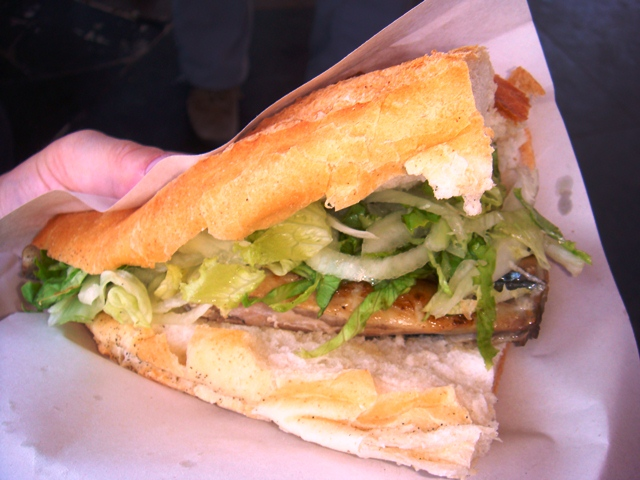
Balık ekmek: grilled fish in a Turkish bread

Balık ekmek (Turkish pronunciation: [ba'lɯk ek'mek]) is a common street food item in Turkish cuisine. It is a sandwich of a filet of fried or grilled fish (typically mackerel, or other similar oily fish), served along with various vegetables, inside a bun of Turkish bread. It is typically served on the Eminönü square straight from the boat on which it is prepared.

The name is a combination of the Turkish words balık 'fish' and ekmek 'bread'.

== See also ==
- Fischbrötchen
- Fish sandwich
- Regional street food: Istanbul
