= Fischbrötchen =

Type of sandwich made with fish

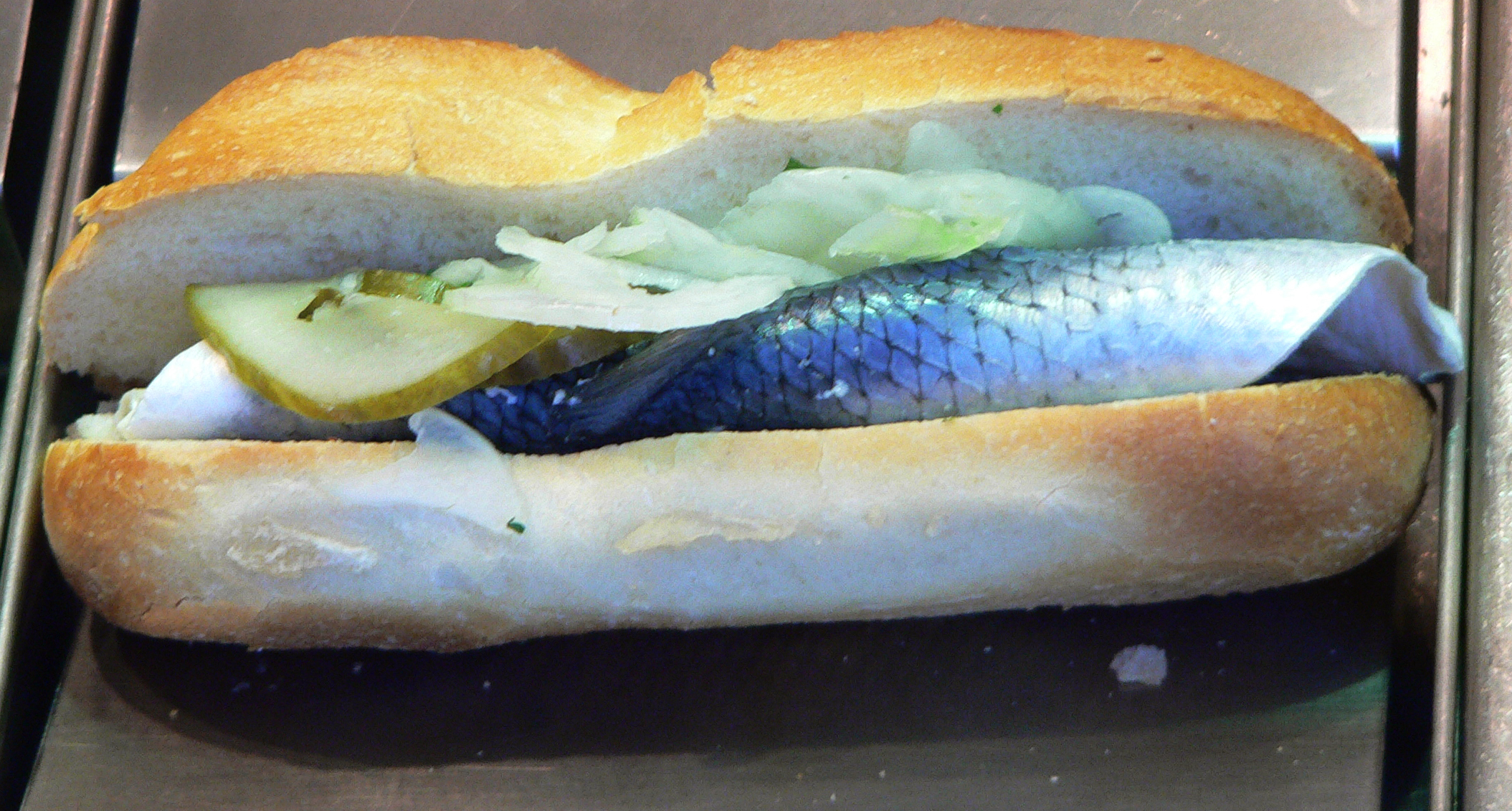
- Fischbrötchen with pickled herring
- Type: Sandwich
- Place of origin: Germany
- Main ingredients: Bread, fish, onions; sometimes remoulade and pickles

A Fischbrötchen (pl. "Fischbrötchen", lit. 'fish bread roll') is a sandwich made with fish and other components such as fresh white or dried onions, pickles, remoulade, creamy horseradish sauce, ketchup, or cocktail sauce. It is commonly eaten in Northern Germany, due to the region's proximity to the North Sea and Baltic Sea.

A common preparation is made with Bismarck herring or soused herring. Other varieties use Brathering, rollmops, European sprat, salmon, smoked Atlantic mackerel, fried Atlantic cod, and other fish varieties (such as fish burgers). Prawns are sometimes used, as are various other species of food fish. Fischbrötchen are commonly served at fast food stands or take-out restaurants.

The Hanover Fair was initially colloquially known as the "Fischbrötchen fair" due to the fish buns served there as a snack.

During a state visit to Hamburg, French president Emmanuel Macron and chancellor Olaf Scholz ate Fischbrötchen together, which featured prominently in the press coverage.

== Gallery ==
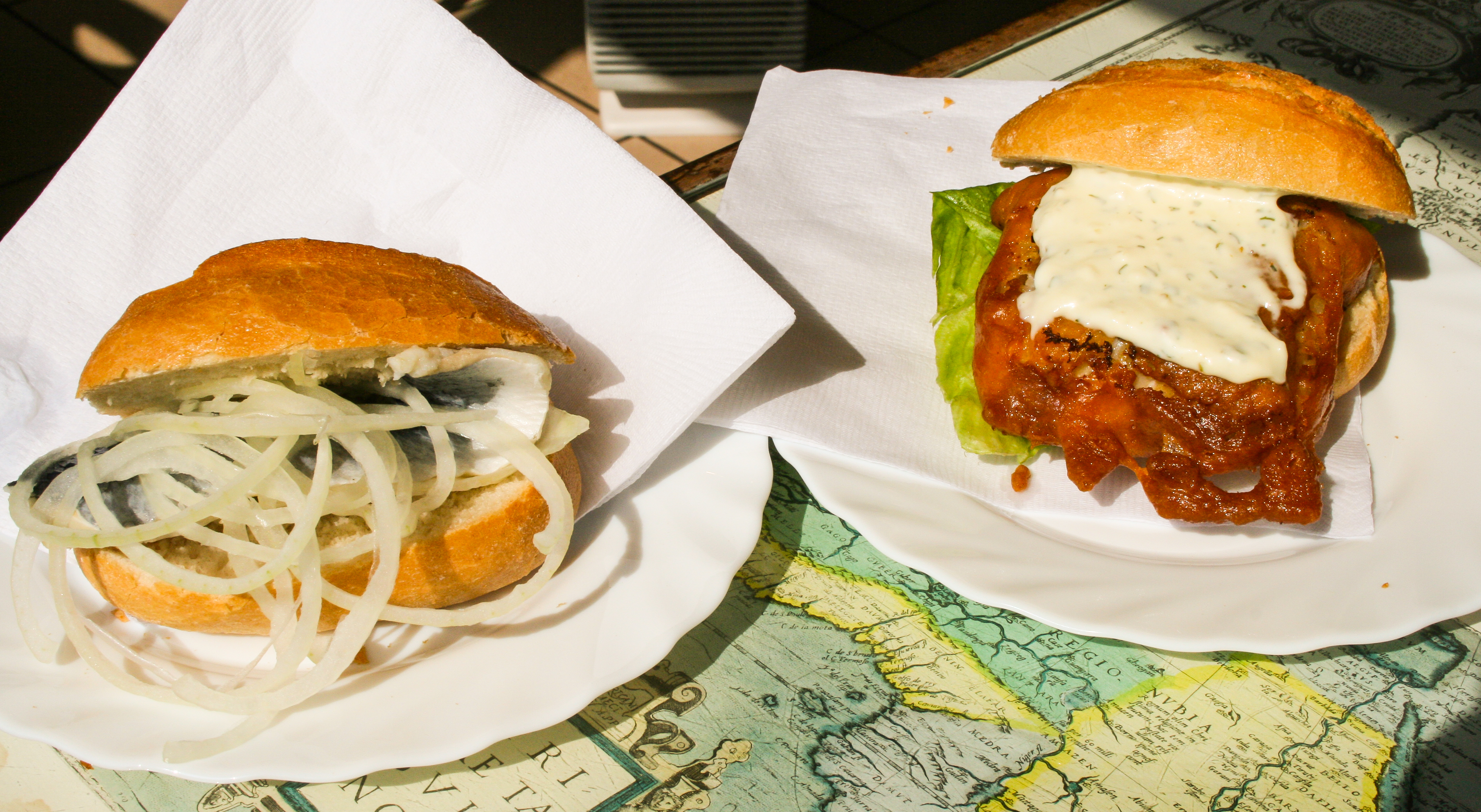
Fischbrötchen

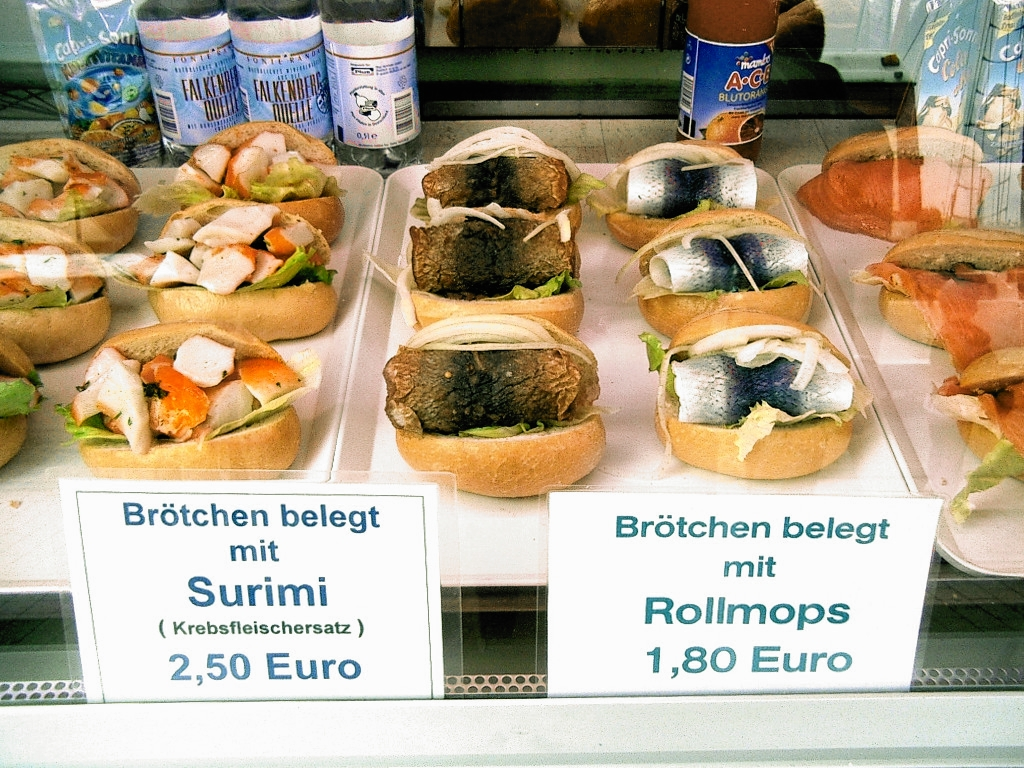
A variety of Fischbrötchen, including with Rollmops

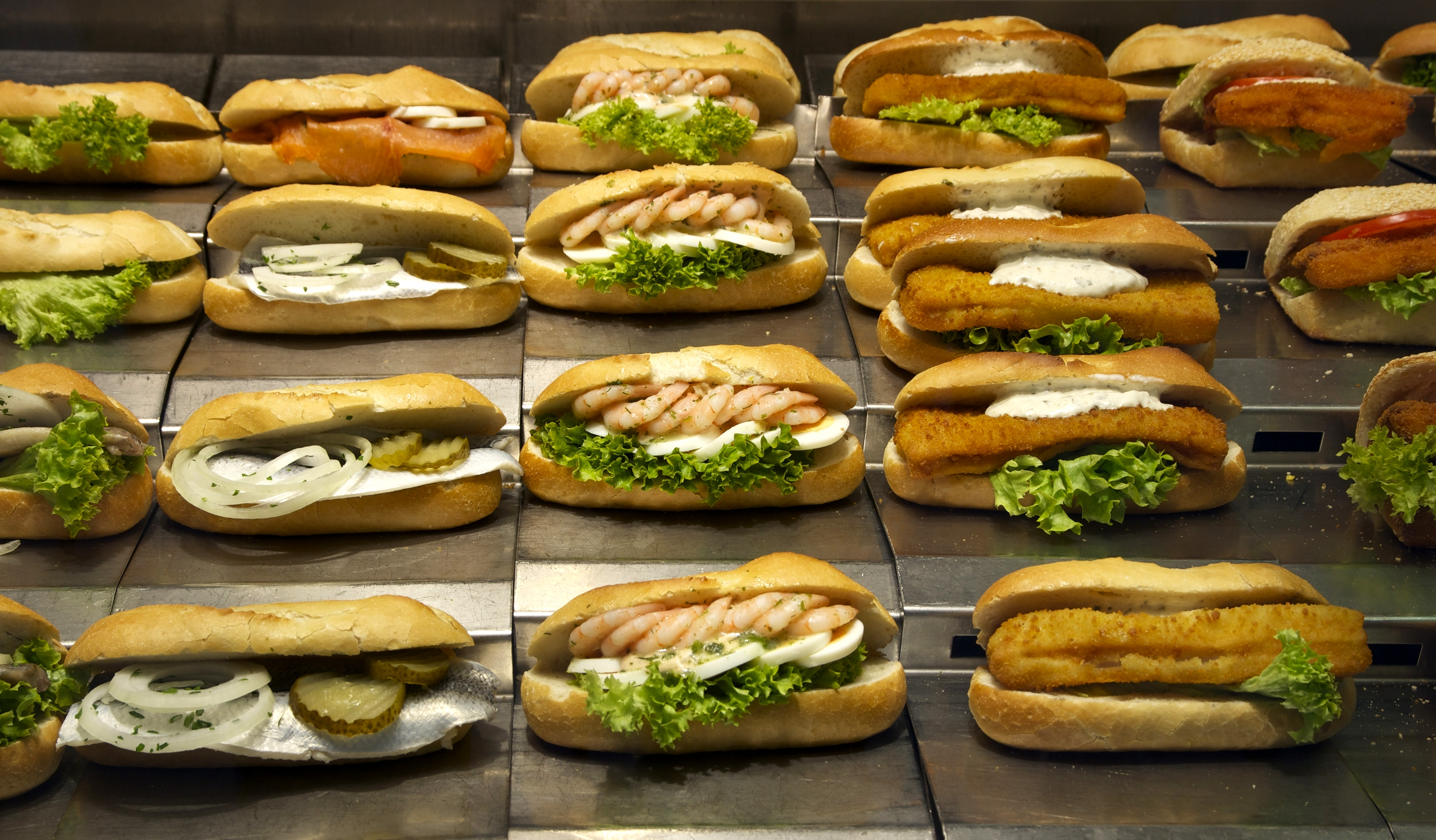
A collection of seafood sandwiches

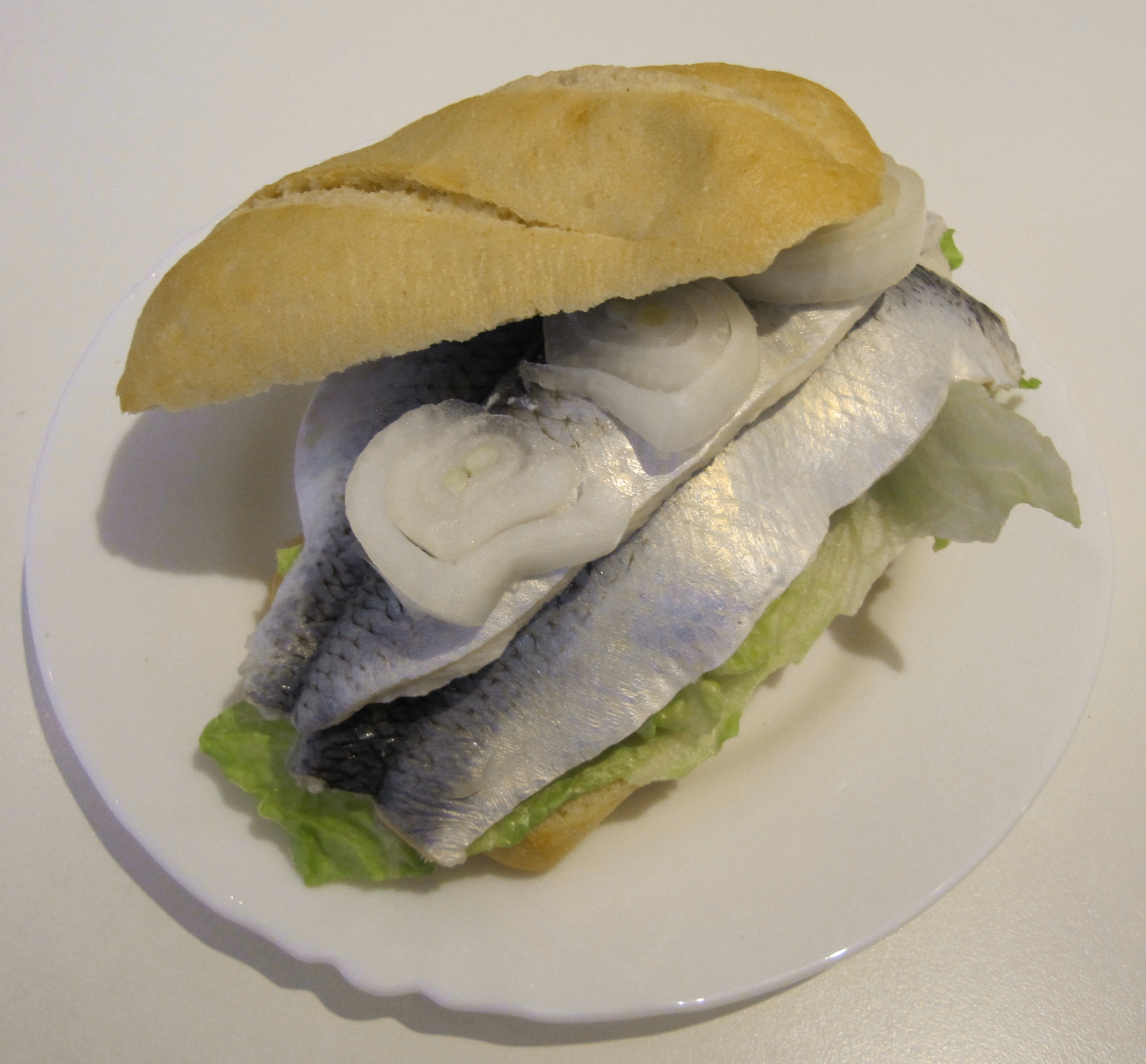
A Fischbrötchen made with pickled herring and onion

== See also ==
- Balık ekmek
- List of sandwiches
