= Fish sandwich =

Sandwich or burger made with fish

A fish sandwich is, most generally, any kind of sandwich made with fish. The term is frequently used to describe food made with breaded, fried fish, which are commonly found in fast food venues.

In American English, a sandwich is any two pieces of bread with filling, including rolls and buns; in British English (and also some other national English varieties such as those of Australia and New Zealand), the word sandwich is defined more narrowly, to require the pieces of bread to be sliced from a loaf, and a roll or bun with filling would not generally be called a sandwich. Thus, what would be considered a fish sandwich in the US may not be considered a sandwich at all in some other English-speaking countries, if it is on a roll or bun as opposed to sliced bread. In Australia, a piece of whole fried fish served on hamburger-style bun would be called a fish burger; that would not generally be considered to be burger in American English, since in American English a burger requires a patty made of ground meat, so something could only be a fish burger if it contained a patty made of ground fish.

== Types ==
Examples include:

Fish finger sandwich

- Fish finger sandwich, a sandwich made with fish fingers popular in Britain where it is a comfort food.
- Tuna sandwich, usually made from canned tuna combined with other ingredients, and which has been called "the mainstay of almost everyone's American childhood".

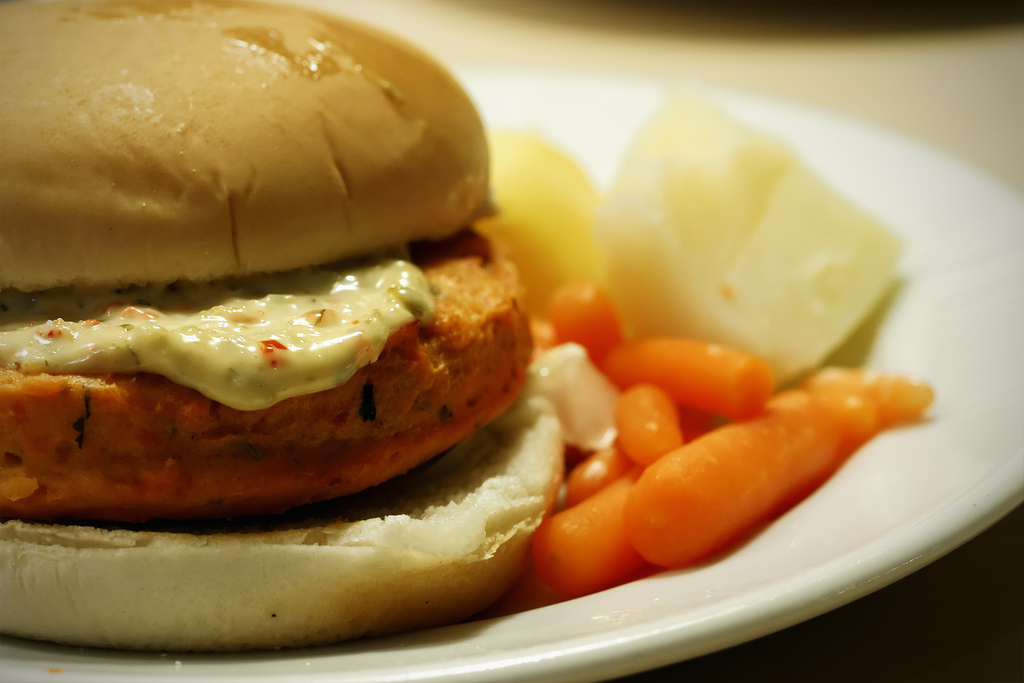
Salmon burger

- Salmon burger, a type of fishcake made mostly from salmon in the style of a hamburger, common in Alaska where they are routinely offered as an alternative to beef hamburgers. The salmon requires a binder to make it stick together and is easy to overcook which makes it too dry.
- Fried fish sandwiches such as the Filet-O-Fish (from McDonald's) and BK Big Fish (Burger King).

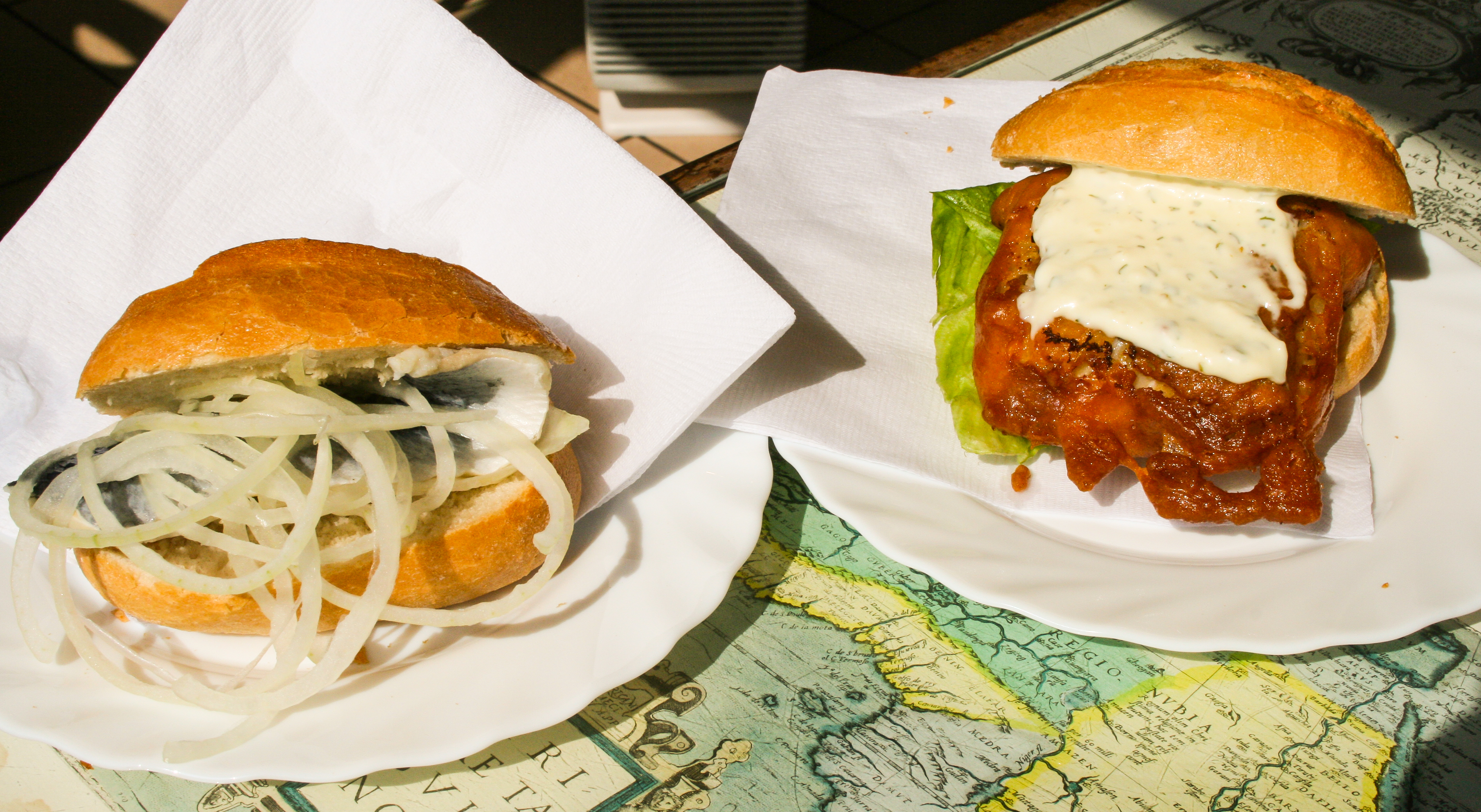
Fischbrötchen

- Fischbrötchen, a sandwich made with fish and other components commonly eaten in Northern Germany, due to the region's proximity to the North Sea and Baltic Sea.
- Balık ekmek (lit. fish bread), a Turkish fish sandwich made with mackerel fillets or other oily fish, which is a specialty of the seafood stalls lining the docks of Istanbul.
- Walleye sandwich, a fried walleye fillet, typically on a burger bun or hard roll.

== See also ==
- Fishcake, a product used as a patty between buns, for some fish burgers
- Fish taco
- Lobster roll
- List of sandwiches
- List of seafood dishes
- Po' boy sandwich
