= Pickled herring =

Traditional way of preserving herring

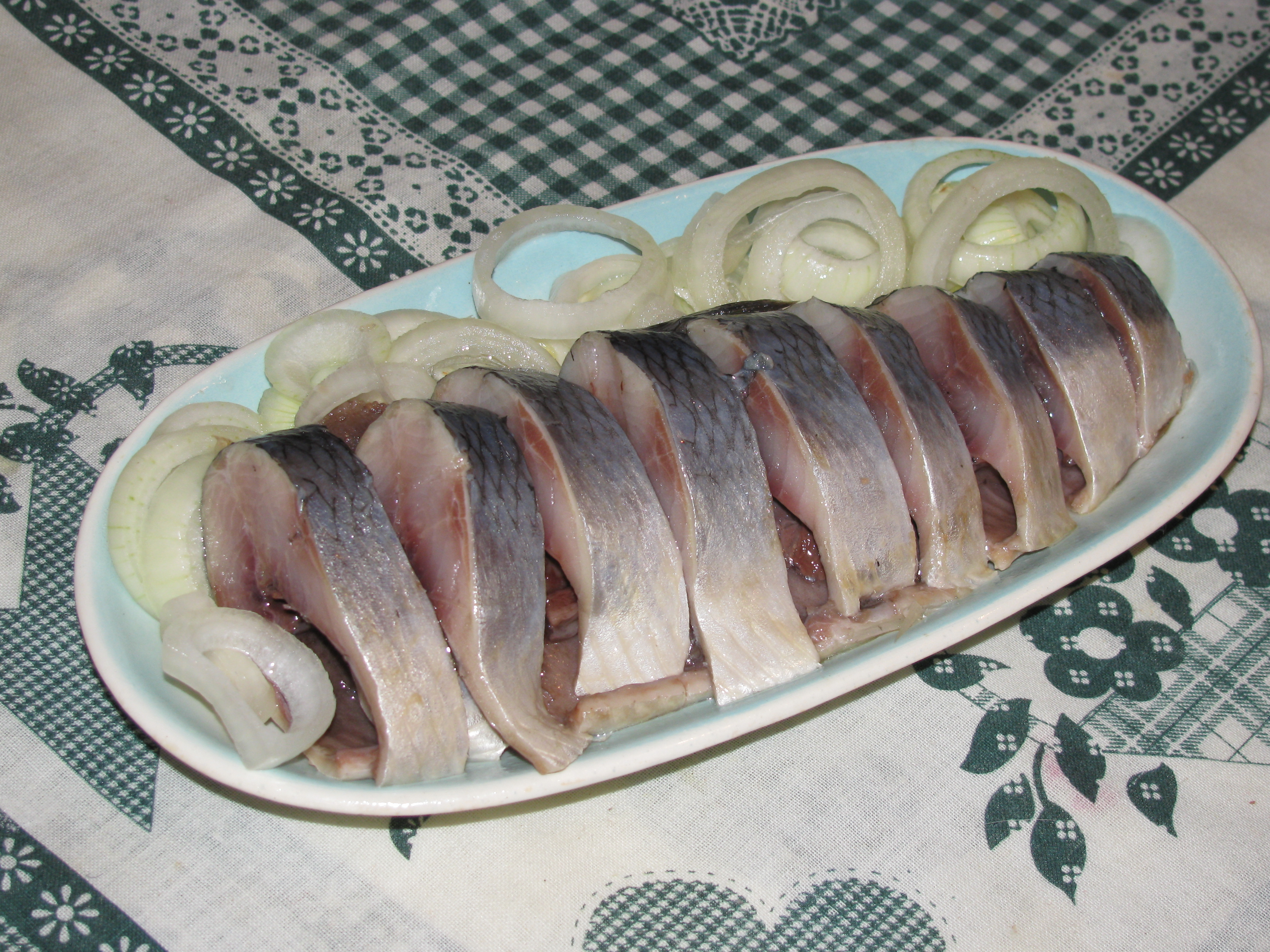
Pickled herring with onions

Pickled herring is a traditional way of preserving herring as food by pickling or curing.

Most cured herring use a two-step curing. The herring is first cured with salt to extract water, then the salt is removed and the herring is placed in vinegar, salt, and sugar solution, often with peppercorn, bay leaf, and raw onions. Additional flavorings include sherry, and dill, while other non-traditional ingredients have also begun being included in recent years.

Pickled herring remains a popular food or ingredient to dishes in many parts of Europe including the Nordic countries, Great Britain, the Baltic, Eastern and Central Europe, as well as the Netherlands. It is also popular in parts of Canada such as British Columbia, Newfoundland, and the Maritimes. It is also associated with Ashkenazi Jewish cuisine, becoming a staple at kiddushes and social gatherings. Pickled herring is one of the Twelve-dish Christmas Eve supper dishes traditionally served at Christmas Eve in Russia, Poland, Lithuania, and Ukraine. Pickled herring is also eaten at the stroke of midnight on New Year's Eve to symbolize a prosperous New Year in Poland, the Czech Republic, Germany, and parts of Scandinavia. Pickled herring with tahini is a popular dish in Egypt usually eaten in the spring holiday of Sham Ennessim.

== History ==
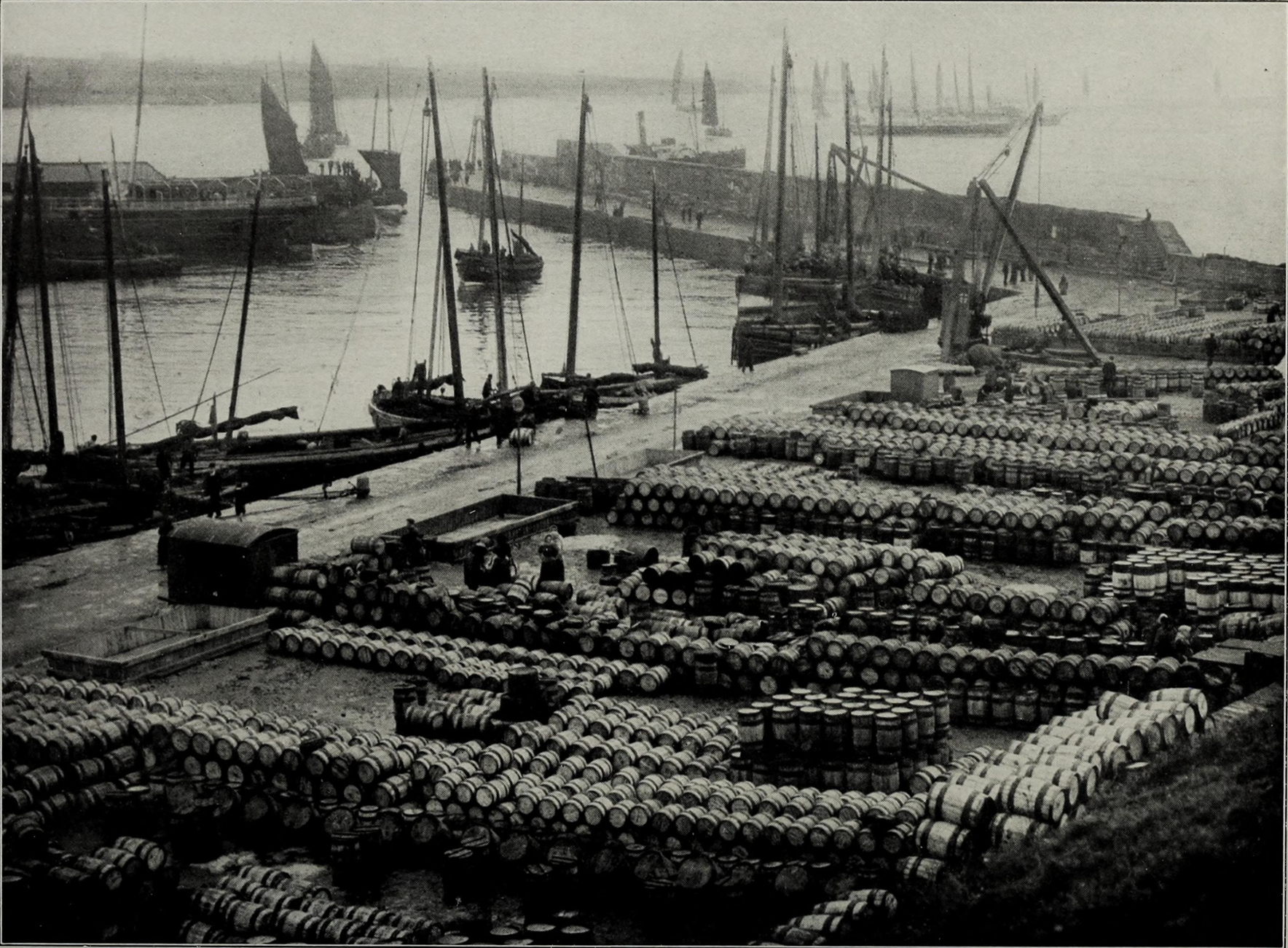
Barrels of herring at a port in Aberdeen, Scotland in the early 20th century

Pickled herrings have been a staple in Northern Europe since medieval times, being a way to store and transport fish, especially necessary in meatless periods like Lent. The herrings would be prepared, then packed in barrels for storage or transportation. In 1801 Dutch fishermen amongst the prisoners of war in the Norman Cross Prison were sent to Scotland to teach the Scottish herring fishermen how to cure fish using the Dutch method.

=== Geographic distribution ===
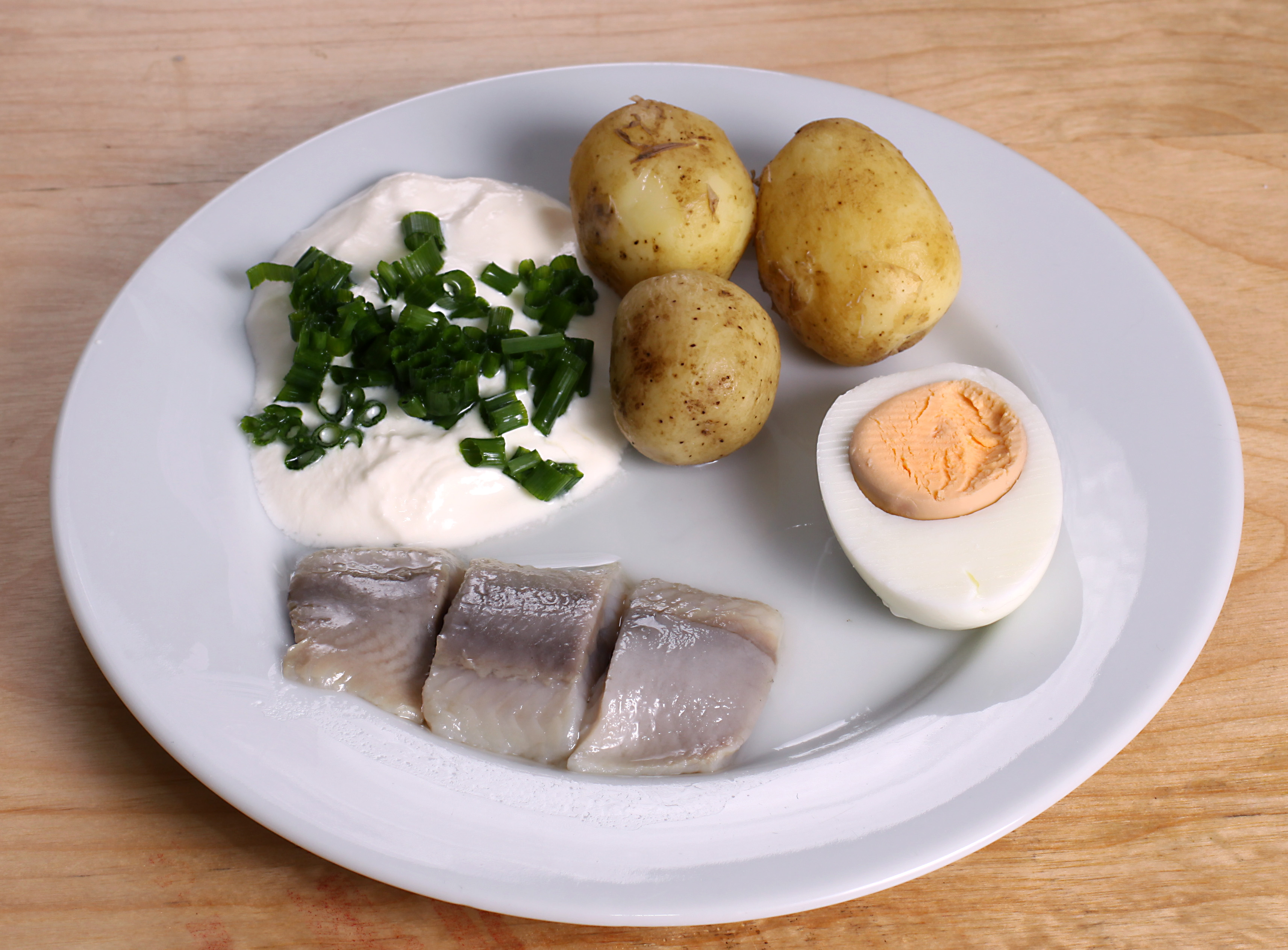
Pickled herring with sour cream, chives, potatoes and egg

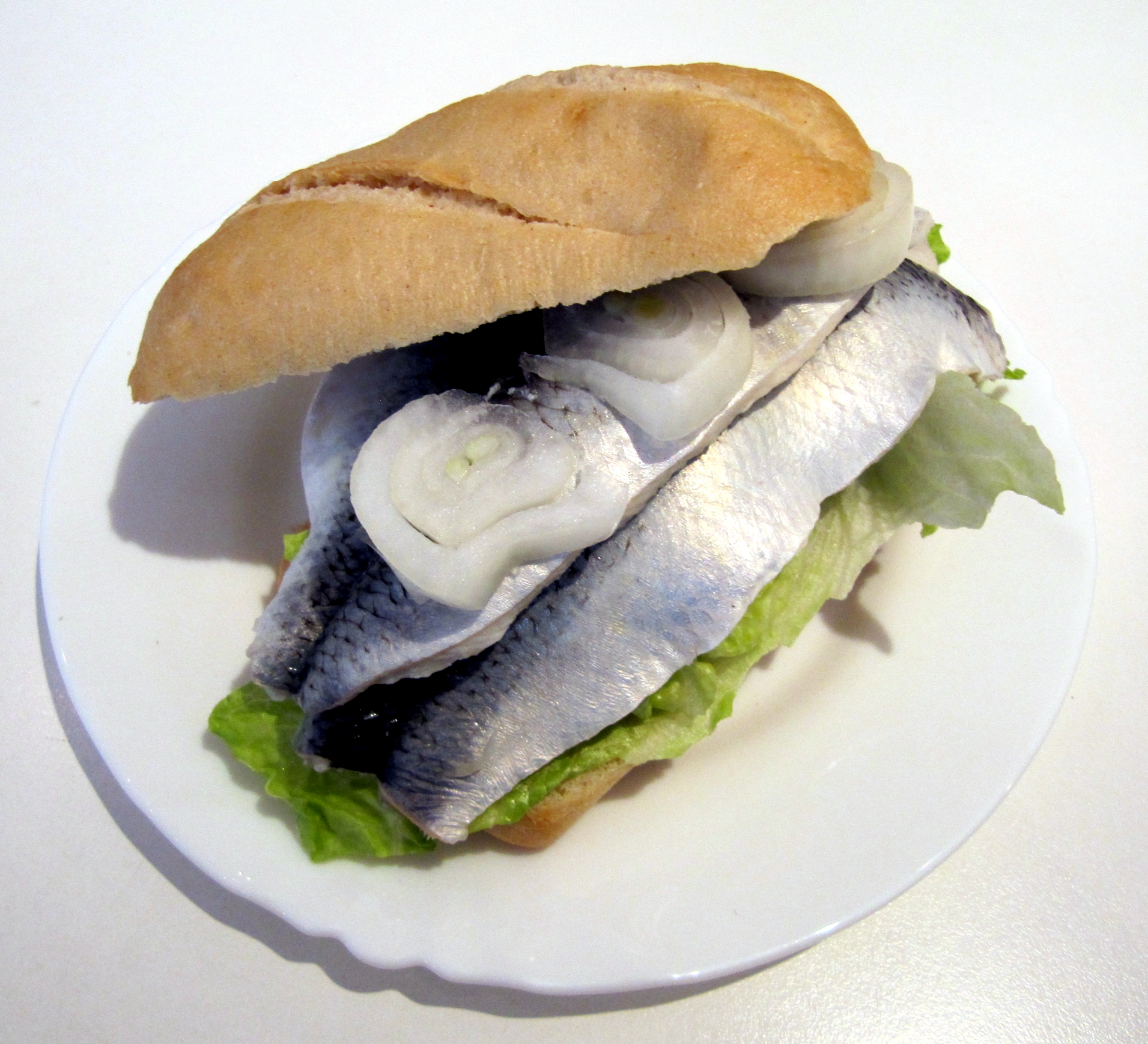
A German Fischbrötchen, consisting of pickled herring served in a roll with lettuce and onion

In the Nordic countries, once the pickling process is finished and depending on which of the dozens of herring flavourings (mustard, onion, garlic, lingonberries etc.) are selected, it is eaten with dark rye bread, crisp bread, sour cream, or potatoes. This dish is common at Christmas, Easter, and Midsummer, where it is frequently accompanied by spirits like akvavit.

Soused herring (maatjesharing or just maatjes in Dutch) is an especially mild salt herring, which is made from young, immature herrings. The herrings are ripened for a couple of days in oak barrels in a salty solution, or brine. In English, a "soused herring" can also be a cooked marinated herring.

Rollmops are pickled herring fillets rolled (hence the name) into a cylindrical shape around a piece of pickled gherkin or an onion. They are thought to have developed as a special treat in 19th century Berlin, and the word borrowed from the German.

Fish cured through pickling or salting have long been consumed in the British Isles. Like jellied eel, it was primarily eaten by, and is sometimes associated with, the working class. Kipper is a dish eaten in Great Britain, Ireland, and parts of Canada. It consists of a split open herring, pickled or salted, and cold-smoked.

Red herring is similar to kippers but is whole and ungutted; it is more heavily salted and is smoked for 2–3 weeks. The main UK export markets are Europe and West Africa.

Pickled herring, especially brined herring, is common in Russia and Ukraine, where it is served cut into pieces and seasoned with sunflower oil and onions, or can be part of herring salads, such as dressed herring (Russian: Сельдь под шубой, Ukrainian: Оселедець під шубою, lit. 'herring under a fur coat'), which are usually prepared with vegetables and seasoned with mayonnaise dressing.

Brined herring is common in Ashkenazi Jewish cuisine, perhaps best known for vorschmack salad known in English simply as "chopped herring" and as schmaltz herring in Yiddish. In Israel it is commonly known as dag maluach which means "salted fish".

Pickled herring can also be found in the cuisine of Hokkaidō in Japan, where families traditionally preserved large quantities for winter.

In Nova Scotia, Canada, pickled herring with onions is called "Solomon Gundy" (not to be confused with the Jamaican pickled fish pâté of the same name).

"Bismarck herring" (German Bismarckhering) is the common name for pickled herring in Germany, and the product is sometimes sold elsewhere under that name. There are various theories as to why the product is associated with Bismarck.

== Nutritional content ==
Pickled herring is rich in tyramine and thus should be avoided in the diet of people being treated with an antidepressant monoamine oxidase inhibitor.

As with fresh herring, pickled herring is an excellent natural source of both vitamin D3 and omega-3 fatty acids. It is also a good source of selenium and vitamin B_{12}. 100 grams may provide 680 IU of vitamin D, or 170% of the DV, as well as 84% of the DV for selenium, and 71% of the DV for vitamin B_{12}.

== See also ==
- List of pickled foods
- Surströmming – Swedish fermented Baltic Sea herring
- きずし (kizushi) Japanese pickled herring
- Pickelhering

== General and cited references ==
- Froese, Rainer; Pauly, Daniel (eds.). "Species in genus Clupea". FishBase. January 2006 version.
- O'Clair, Rita M. and O'Clair, Charles E., "Pacific herring," Southeast Alaska's Rocky Shores: Animals. pp. 343–46. Plant Press: Auke Bay, Alaska (1998). ISBN 0-9664245-0-6
