= Herring soup =

Fish soup

- Type: Fish soup
- Place of origin: Sweden
- Main ingredients: Water, barley meal, red herring

Herring soup is a fish soup consisting of a thick mix of water, barley-meal and red herring.

== See also ==
- List of soups
