= Rollmops =

Pickled herring fillets

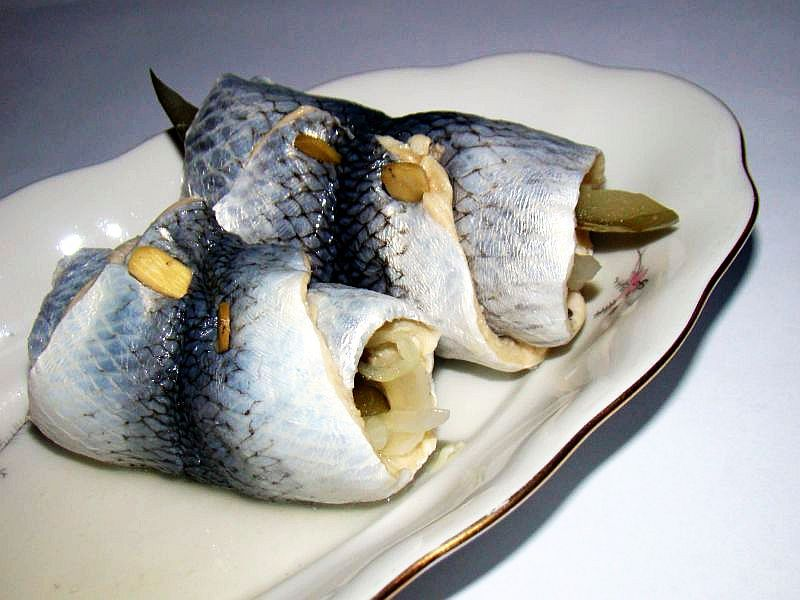
- Place of origin: Germany
- Main ingredients: pickled herring

Rollmops are pickled herring fillets, rolled into a cylindrical shape, often around a savoury filling.

== Presentation ==
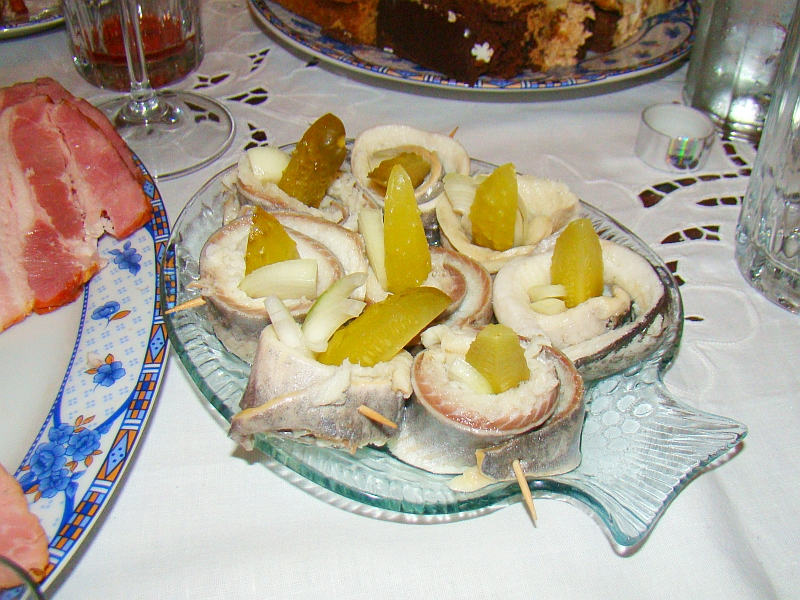
Rollmops, Christmas Eve table. Herring are important in Wigilia Polish culture.

The filling usually consists of onion and sliced pickled gherkin. Rollmops are often skewered with a cocktail skewer.

Rollmops are usually bought ready-to-eat, in jars or tubs. The brine additionally consists of water, white vinegar, and salt; it may also contain sugar or other sweetening agents (commonly sold as "sweet pickled"), onion rings, peppercorns and mustard seeds. Rollmops can be eaten cold, without unrolling, or on bread. After the jar has been opened, they will usually keep for two to three weeks if kept cool or refrigerated. Rollmops are sometimes served with Labskaus.

== Etymology ==
One version of the origin of the name "rollmops" is that it is German in origin, derived from the words rollen (to roll) and Mops meaning pug or fat young boy. The form Rollmops (German: [ˈʁɔlˌmɔps]) is singular, and the plural is Rollmöpse (German: [ˈʁɔlˌmœpsə]).

In English, the term "rollmops" is often treated as the plural of the singular "rollmop". There is also a theory that the term "roll-'em-ups" became "rollmops." The form "rollmop herrings" is also attested.

== Origins ==
Pickled herring has been a staple in Northern Europe since medieval times, being a way to store and transport fish, especially necessary in meatless periods like Lent. The herring would be prepared, then packed in barrels for storage or transportation.

Rollmops grew popular throughout Germany during the Biedermeier period of the early 19th century and were known as a particular specialty of Berlin, like the similar pickled herring dish Bismarckhering. A crucial factor in their popularity was the development of the long-range railway network, which allowed the transport of herring from the North and Baltic seas to the interior. The fish was pickled to preserve it and transported in wooden barrels. In pubs in Old Berlin, it was common to have high-rising glass display cases known as Hungerturm (meaning "hunger tower") on the bar to present ready-to-eat dishes like lard bread, salt eggs, meatballs, mettwurst, and of course rollmops. Nowadays rollmops are commonly served as part of the German Katerfrühstück (hangover breakfast) which is believed to restore some electrolytes.

== Distribution ==
Rollmops are eaten in Europe and South America, as well as in areas of the United States and Canada. It is also a sought-after delicacy in South Africa, particularly in Cape Town and the greater Western Cape Province. In Czechia and Slovakia rollmops (zavináč) are so well known that they gave rise to those countries' name for the @ sign.

== See also ==
- Battle of the Herrings – 1429 battle of the Hundred Years' War in Rouvray, France
- Brathering – Traditional German dish
