= Avruga caviar =

Caviar substitute made from herring and squid ink, made without any fish roe

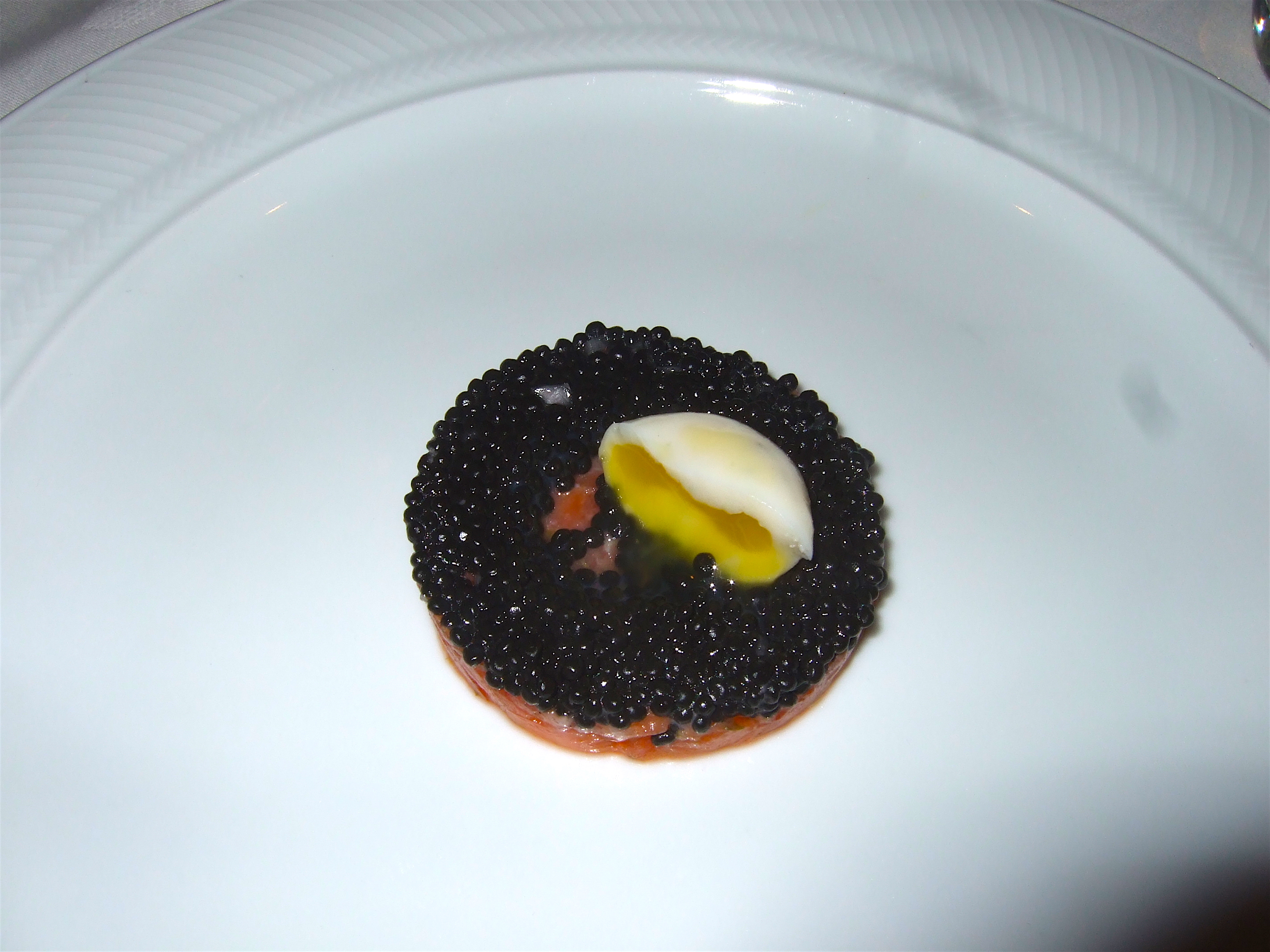
Smoked trout, topped with avruga caviar and a quail's egg

Avruga is a product made from herring and other products (water, herring-40%, salt, corn starch, lemon juice, citric acid, xanthan gum, sodium benzoate, squid ink) that is marketed as a caviar substitute. Unlike caviar, it does not contain fish roe.

Avruga is produced by the Spanish company Pescaviar. Avruga has Marine Stewardship Council "Chain of Custody" certification.
