= Brathering =

Traditional German dish

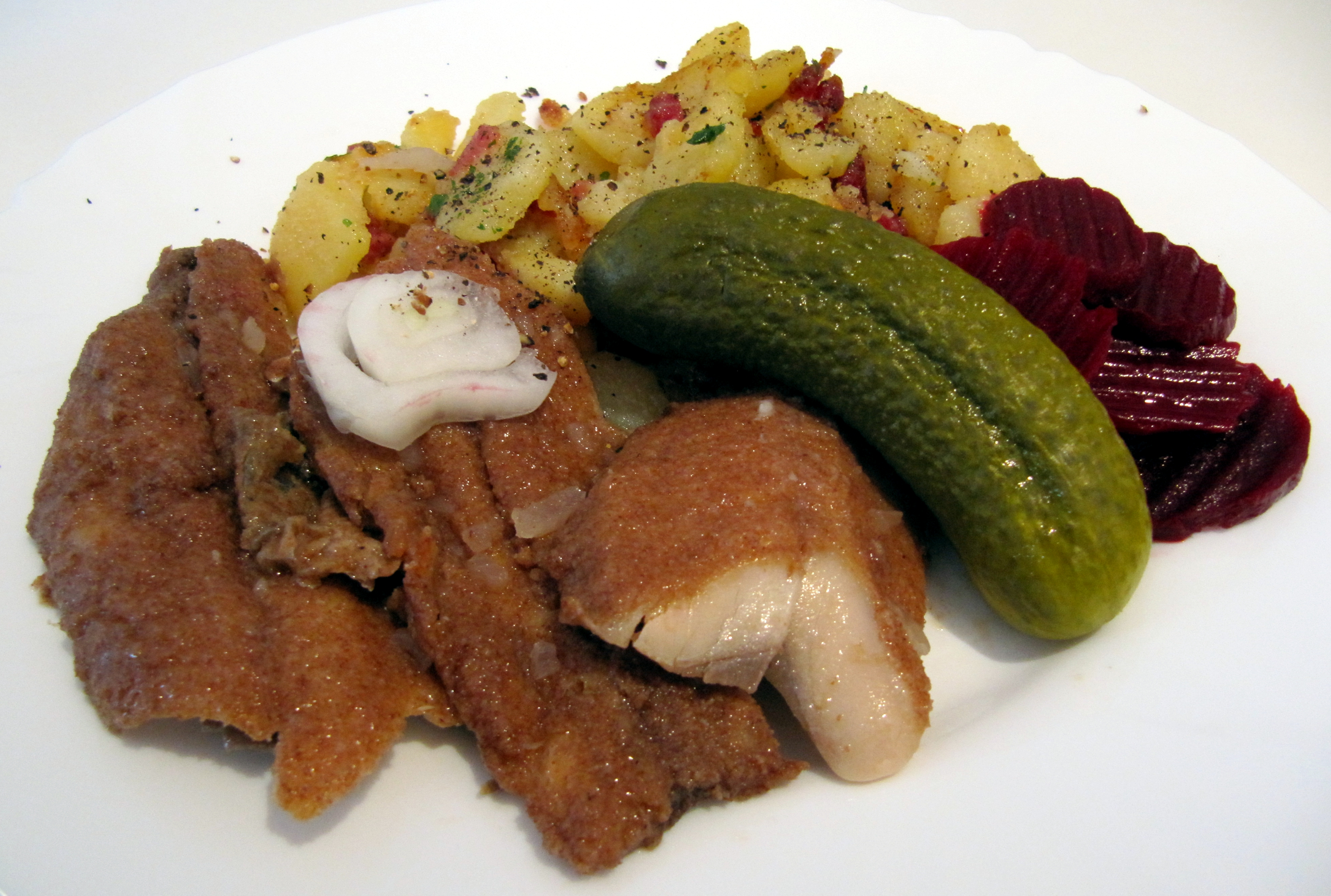
A traditional and simple lunch in Hamburg: Brathering with fried potatoes

Brathering (/ˈbrɑːtˌheɪrɪŋ/; German: [ˈbʁaːtˌheːʁɪŋ]; English: "fried herring") is a simple and traditional German dish of marinated fried herring. It is typical of the cuisine in northern Germany and the northern parts of the Netherlands, either for lunch or as a snack at fast food stands or take-out restaurants.

== Preparation ==
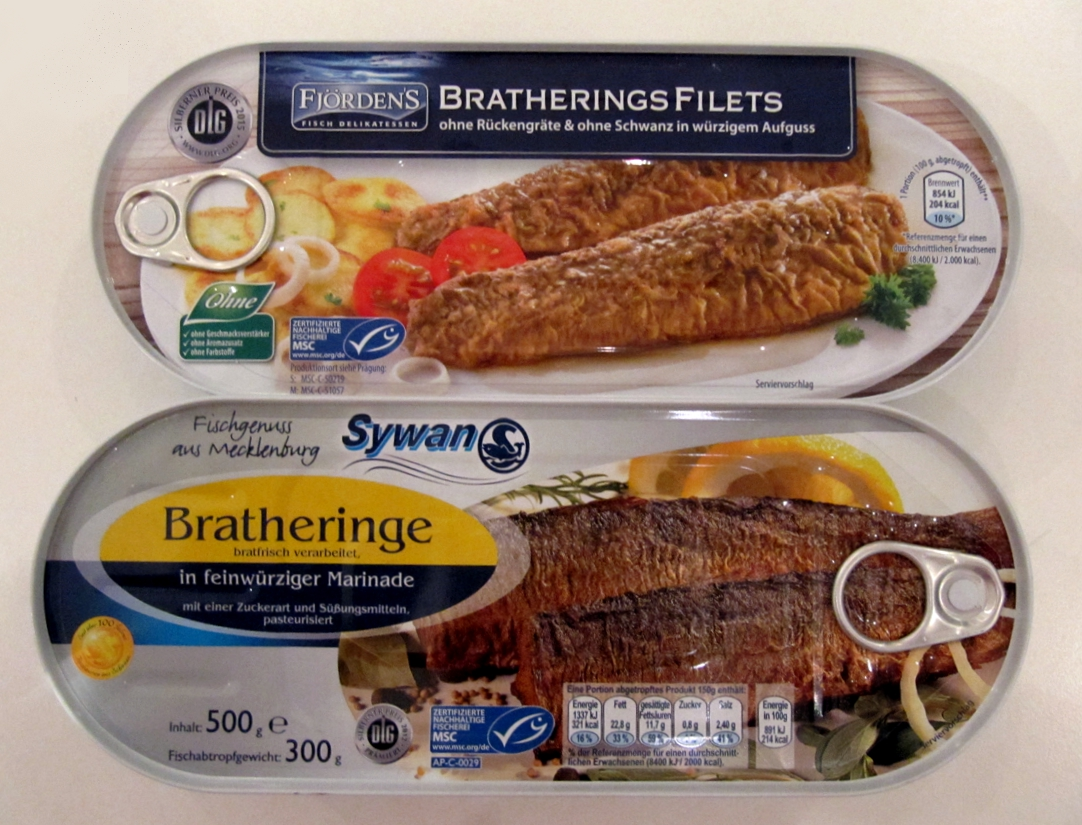
Two cans of Brathering as sold in German supermarkets

Usually, the green (i.e., fresh) herring with the heads and guts removed are either breaded or simply turned in flour, then fried, and finally pickled in a marinade of white vinegar and briefly boiled water, onion, salt, spices like pepper, bay leaves, mustard seeds, and a little sugar. The thin bones of the green herring are partially dissolved in the marinade, so that they hardly interfere with eating.

If refrigerated, fried herring may be preserved for up to two weeks. Brathering is also available as a commercial product in cans.

== Typical servings ==
Brathering itself is served well pervaded and cold, together with warm fried potatoes (Bratkartoffeln) or cold potato salad (Kartoffelsalat).

Sometimes, Brathering is also offered as part of fish sandwiches (Fischbrötchen).

== In culture ==
- Martin Luther stated that Brathering served with cooked green peas and mustard was one of his favorite dishes.

== Literature ==
- Koios, Eloi Rylan (2011): Brathering. List of Raw Fish Dishes, Fish (Food), and Seafood. TRACT. ISBN 978-613-8-59305-8.
- Organisation for Economic Co-Operation and Development (2009) Multilingual Dictionary of Fish and Fish Products Page 147, John Wiley & Sons. ISBN 978-140-5-15760-5.
