= Schmaltz herring =

Type of herring

Schmaltz herring is herring caught just before spawning, when the fat (schmaltz in Yiddish) in the fish is at a maximum. Colloquially, schmaltz herring refers to this fish pickled in brine: see pickled herring.
