= Buckling (fish) =

Smoked herring dish

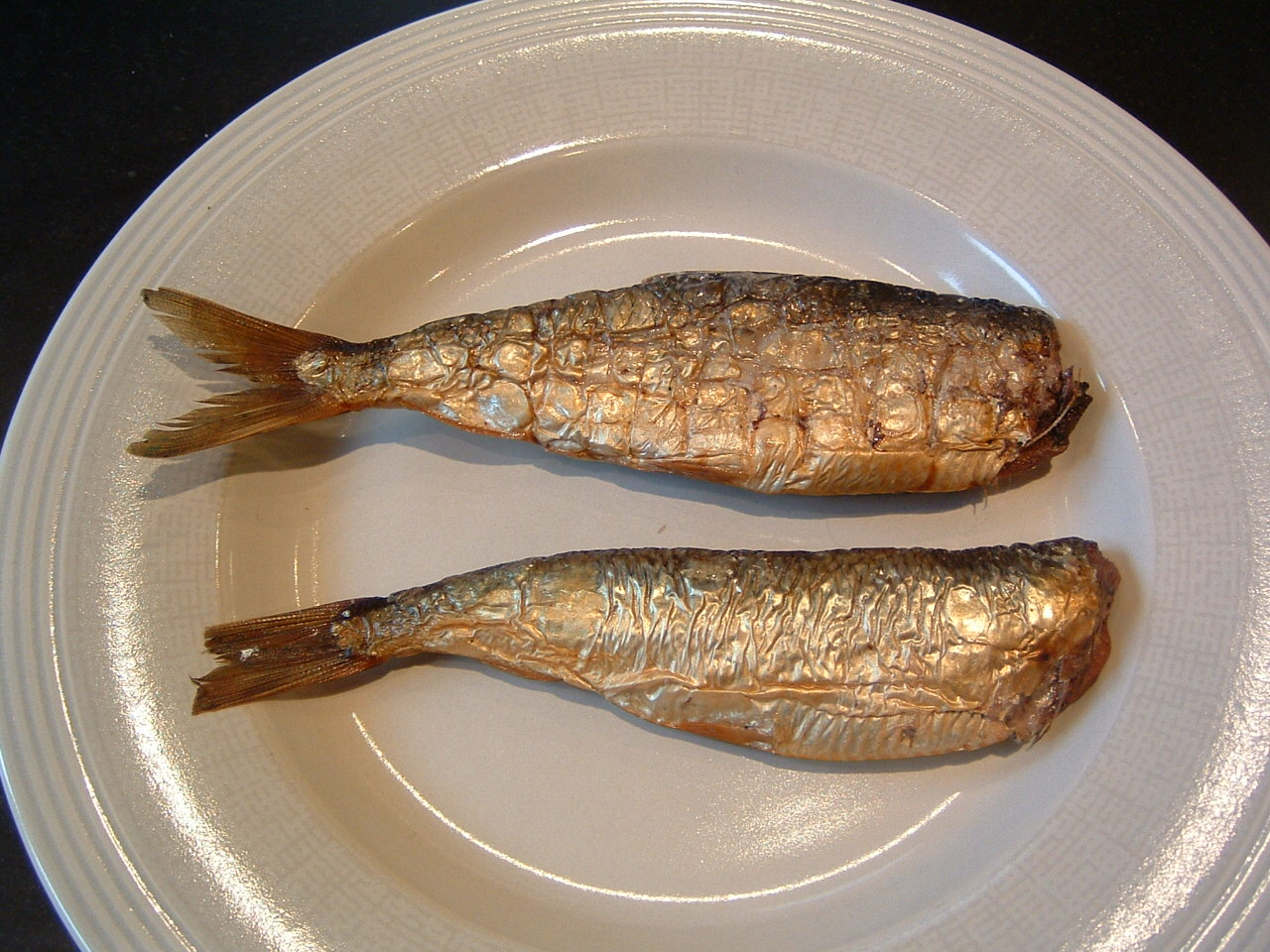
Buckling

A buckling is a form of hot-smoked herring similar to the kipper and the bloater. The head and guts are removed but the roe or milt remain. They may be eaten hot or cold.

== Terminology ==
The name comes from the German word Bückling or the Swedish böckling, both words denoting a type of hot-smoked herring and is a reference to its bad smell reminiscent of the smell of a buck.

== Bucklings, bloaters and kippers ==
All three are types of smoked herring. Bucklings are hot-smoked whole; bloaters are cold-smoked whole; kippers are split, gutted and then cold-smoked.

== See also ==
- Fish preservation
- Herring as food
- List of dried foods
- List of smoked foods
- Red herring
- Smoked fish
- Solomon Gundy
