= Bloater (herring) =

Term for herring that is smoked whole

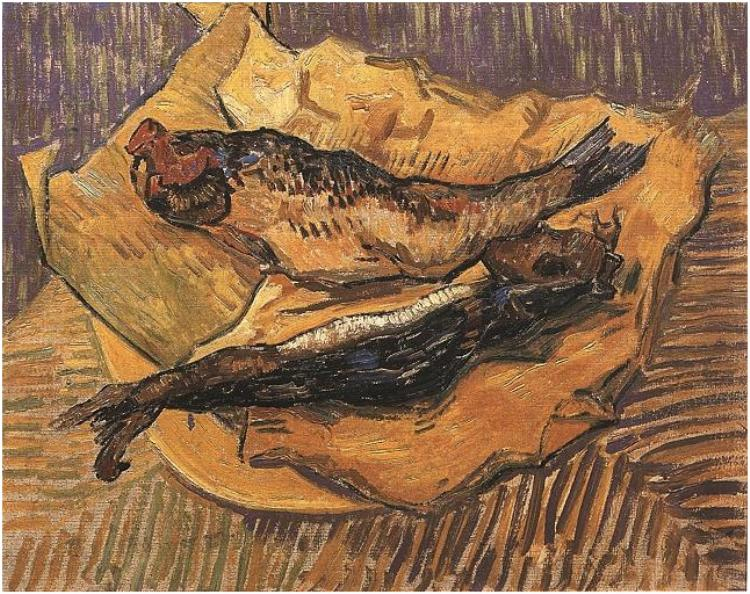
Bloaters on yellow paper, van Gogh, 1889

Bloaters, a type of whole cold-smoked herring, are "salted and lightly smoked without gutting, giving them a characteristic slightly gamey flavour". They have a particular association with Great Yarmouth, England. Though popular in the 19th and early-20th centuries, the food has become rare. Bloaters are sometimes called Yarmouth bloaters, although production of the product in Yarmouth appears to have now ceased in the town with the closure of its smoked-fish factory in 2018. The bloater is also sometimes jokingly referred to as a Yarmouth capon, a two-eyed steak, or a Billingsgate pheasant (after the Billingsgate Fish Market in London).

The bloater is associated with England, while kippers share an association with Scotland and the Isle of Man (the Manx kipper). Bloaters are "salted less and smoked for a shorter time", while kippers are "lightly salted and smoked overnight"; the preparation of red herring features more salt and a longer smoking-time.

== Terminology ==
The name "bloater" most likely arises from the swelled or "bloated" appearance the fish assumes during preparation, while at least one source attributes it to the Swedish word "blöta", meaning to wet, soak, or impregnate with liquid (as in soaking in brine).

== Bloaters, bucklings and kippers ==
All three are types of smoked herring. Bloaters are cold-smoked whole; bucklings are hot-smoked whole; kippers are split, gutted and then cold-smoked.

== See also ==
- Fish preservation
- Herring as food
- List of dried foods
- List of smoked foods
- Red herring, a term for an irrelevant distraction
- Smoked fish
- Solomon Gundy
