= Brown FK =

- Chemicals structures of the dye components of Brown FK

Names
- Other names: Kipper Brown; Chocolate Brown FK; C.I. Food Brown 1

Identifiers
CAS Number	8062-14-4
3D model (JSmol)	Interactive image
ChemSpider	74250
ECHA InfoCard	100.122.899
EC Number	617-128-3
E number	E154 (colours)
PubChem CID	82276
UNII	3W47CEB8Q9
- InChI: InChI=1S/C18H16N6O6S2.C13H14N4O3S.3Na/c19-15-9-16(20)18(24-22-12-3-7-14(8-4-12)32(28,29)30)10-17(15)23-21-11-1-5-13(6-2-11)31(25,26)27;1-8-6-13(12(15)7-11(8)14)17-16-9-2-4-10(5-3-9)21(18,19)20;;;/h1-10H,19-20H2,(H,25,26,27)(H,28,29,30);2-7H,14-15H2,1H3,(H,18,19,20);;;/q;;3*+1/p-3 Key: YJCJAUSWVUZMSY-UHFFFAOYSA-K
- SMILES: CC1=CC(=C(C=C1N)N)N=NC2=CC=C(C=C2)S(=O)(=O)[O-].C1=CC(=CC=C1N=NC2=CC(=C(C=C2N)N)N=NC3=CC=C(C=C3)S(=O)(=O)[O-])S(=O)(=O)[O-].[Na+].[Na+].[Na+]
- Except where otherwise noted, data are given for materials in their standard state (at 25 °C [77 °F], 100 kPa). Infobox references

Brown FK, also called Kipper Brown, Chocolate Brown FK, and C.I. Food Brown 1, is a brown mixture of six synthetic azo dyes, with addition of sodium chloride, and/or sodium sulfate. It is very soluble in water. When used as a food dye, its E number is E154.

It was once used in smoked and cured mackerels and other fish and also in some cooked hams and other meats. It gave a "healthy" color that did not fade during cooking, nor leach.

It is currently not approved for use in the European Union (but was allowed to color kippers to produce orange kippers), in Australia, Austria, Canada, United Kingdom, United States, Japan, Switzerland, New Zealand, Norway, and Russia.

In 2011, a review by the European Food Safety Authority concluded that Brown FK was no longer used and the Authority could not conclude on the safety of the substance due to the deficiencies in the available toxicity data. Therefore, it should not be included in the Union list of approved food additives.

== Components ==
The dyes it contains are:

- 4-(2,4-diaminophenylazo)benzenesulfonate, sodium salt
- 4-(4,6-diamino-m-tolylazo)benzenesulfonate, sodium salt
- 4,4'-(4,6-diamino-1,3-phenylenebisazo)-di(benzenesulfonate), disodium salt
- 4,4'-(2,4-diamino-1,3-phenylenebisazo)-di(benzenesulfonate), disodium salt
- 4,4'-(2,4-diamino-5-methyl-1,3-phenylenebisazo)-di(benzenesulfonate), disodium salt
- 4,4',4''-(2,4-diaminobenzene-1,3,5-trisazo)-tri(benzenesulfonate), trisodium salt
