= Fish preservation =

Techniques for preserving fish

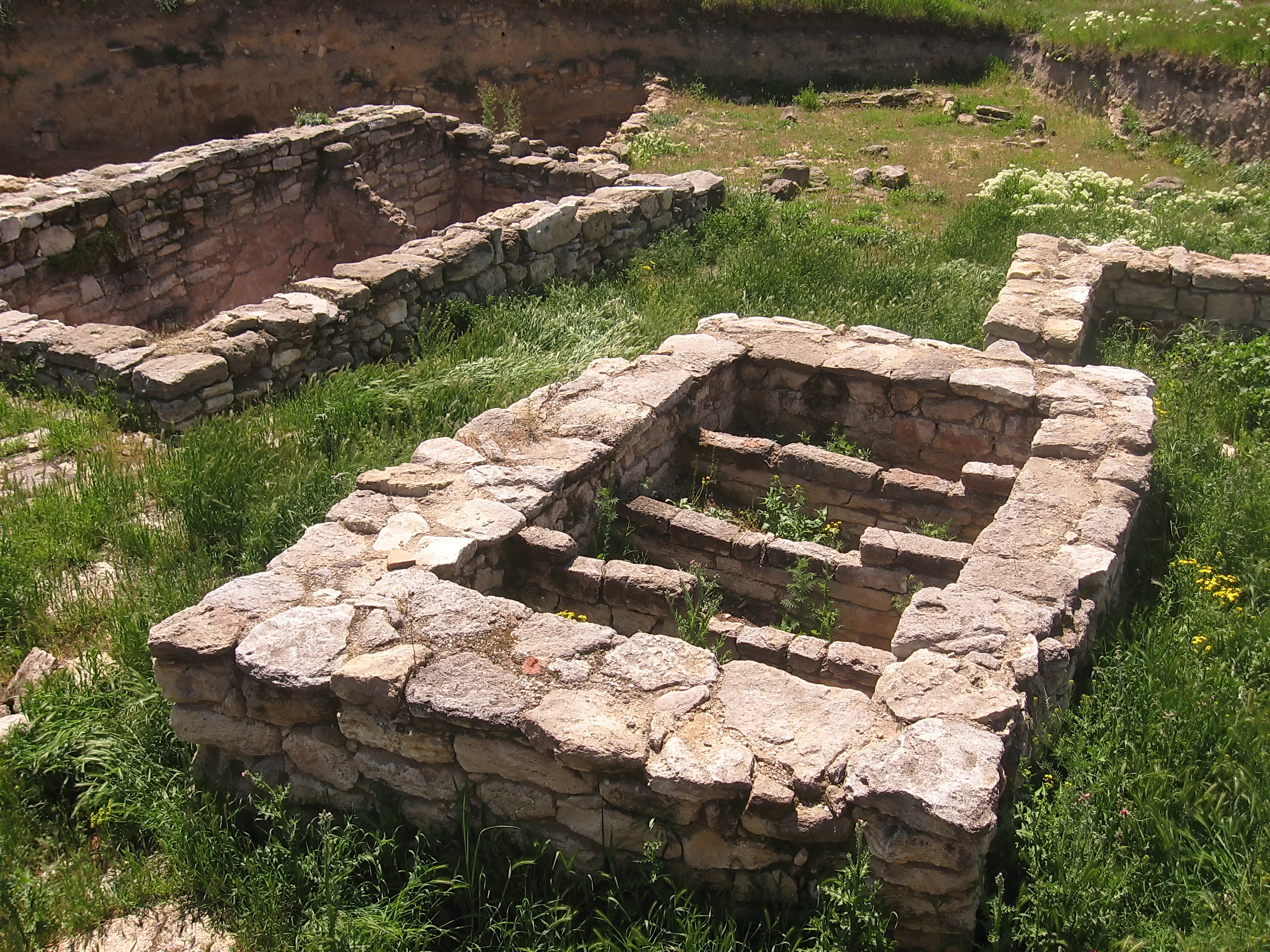
An ancient basin for fish preservation in Tyritake, Crimea

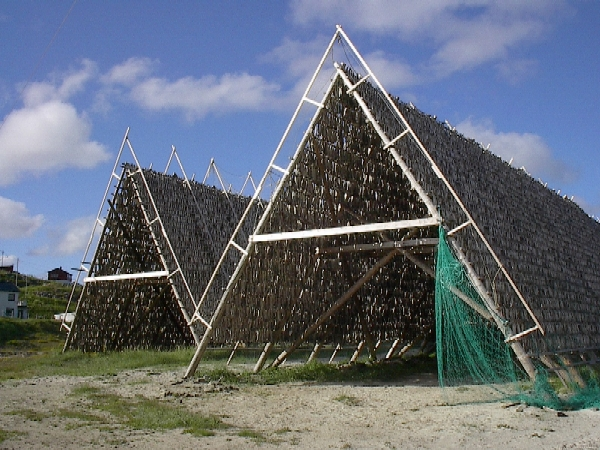
A fish-drying rack in Norway

Fish preservation is the method of increasing the shelf life of fish and other fish products by applying the principles of different branches of science in order to keep the fish, after it has landed, in a condition wholesome and fit for human consumption. Ancient methods of preserving fish included drying, salting, pickling and smoking. All of these techniques are still used today but the more modern techniques of freezing and canning have taken on a large importance.

Fish curing includes and of curing fish by drying, salting, smoking, and pickling, or by combinations of these processes have been employed since ancient times. On sailing vessels fish were usually salted down immediately to prevent spoilage; the swifter boats of today commonly bring in unsalted fish. Modern freezing and canning methods have largely supplanted older methods of preservation. Fish to be cured are usually first cleaned, scaled, and eviscerated. Fish are salted by packing them between layers of salt or by immersion in brine. The fish most extensively salted are cod, herring, mackerel, and haddock. Smoking preserves fish by drying, by deposition of creosote ingredients, and, when the fish are near the source of heat, by heat penetration. Herring and haddock (finnan haddie) are commonly smoked. Kippers are split herring, and bloaters are whole herring, salted and smoked. Sardines, pilchards, and anchovies are small fish of the herring family, often salted and smoked and then preserved in oil. Fish are dried under controlled conditions of temperature, humidity, and air velocity. Since the dried product is relatively unappetizing and rehydrating slow, other preservation methods are common.

== History ==
Socio-economic value of fish preservation

Preservation of marine products is of great importance to the coastal poor. Preserved fish products ensure adequate protein during low fishing periods. Subsistence fishers use their abundant catch of small fish to make fermented fish paste and smoked fish with the assistance of family members. Large fish are used to make fermented fish or salt dried fish. Other important processing activities include drying of small shrimp, squid, ray and shark and preparation of shrimp paste.

In the past, fishing vessels were restricted in range by the simple consideration that the catch must be returned to port before it spoils and becomes worthless. The development of refrigeration and freezing technologies transformed the commercial fishing industry: fishing vessels could be larger, spending more time away from port and therefore accessing fish stocks at a much greater distance. Refrigeration and freezing also allow the catch to be distributed to markets further inland, reaching customers who previously would have had access only to dried or salted sea fish.

Canning, developed during the 19th century, has also had a significant impact on fishing by allowing seasonal catches of fish that are possibly far from large centres of population to be exploited. For example: canned sardines.

Preservation techniques are needed to prevent fish spoilage and lengthen shelf life. They are designed to inhibit the activity of spoilage bacteria and the metabolic changes that result in the loss of fish quality. Spoilage bacteria are the specific bacteria that produce the unpleasant odours and flavours associated with spoiled fish. Fish normally host many bacteria that are not spoilage bacteria, and most of the bacteria present on spoiled fish played no role in the spoilage. To flourish, bacteria need the right temperature, sufficient water and oxygen, and surroundings that are not too acidic. Preservation techniques work by interrupting one or more of these needs. Preservation techniques can be classified as follows.

== Control of temperature ==
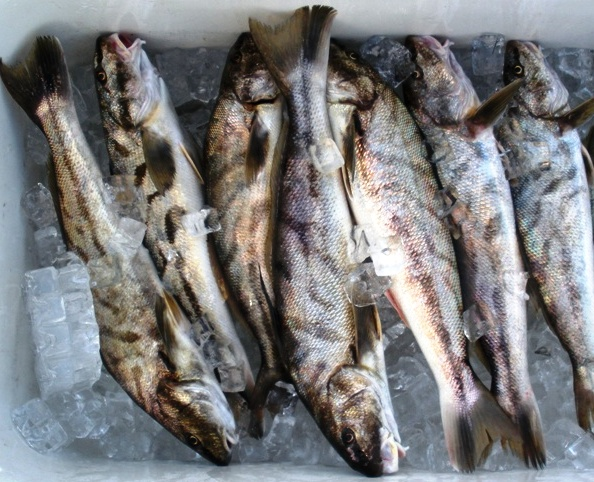
Ice preserves fish and extends shelf life by lowering the temperature

If the temperature is decreased, the metabolic activity in the fish from microbial or autolytic processes can be reduced or stopped. This is achieved by refrigeration where the temperature is dropped to about 0 °C, or freezing where the temperature is dropped below -18 °C. On fishing vessels, the fish are refrigerated mechanically by circulating cold air or by packing the fish in boxes with ice. Forage fish, which are often caught in large numbers, are usually chilled with refrigerated or chilled seawater. Once chilled or frozen, the fish need further cooling to maintain the low temperature. There are key issues with fish cold store design and management, such as how large and energy efficient they are, and the way they are insulated and palletized.

An effective method of preserving the freshness of fish is to chill with ice by distributing ice uniformly around the fish. It is a safe cooling method that keeps the fish moist and in an easily stored form suitable for transport. It has become widely used since the development of mechanical refrigeration, which makes ice easy and cheap to produce. Ice is produced in various shapes; crushed ice and ice flakes, plates, tubes and blocks are commonly used to cool fish. Particularly effective is slurry ice, made from microcrystals of ice formed and suspended within a solution of water and a freezing point depressant, such as common salt.

A more recent development is pumpable ice technology. Pumpable ice flows like water, and because it is homogeneous, it cools fish faster than freshwater solid ice methods and eliminates freeze burns. It complies with HACCP and ISO food safety and public health standards, and uses less energy than conventional freshwater solid ice technologies.

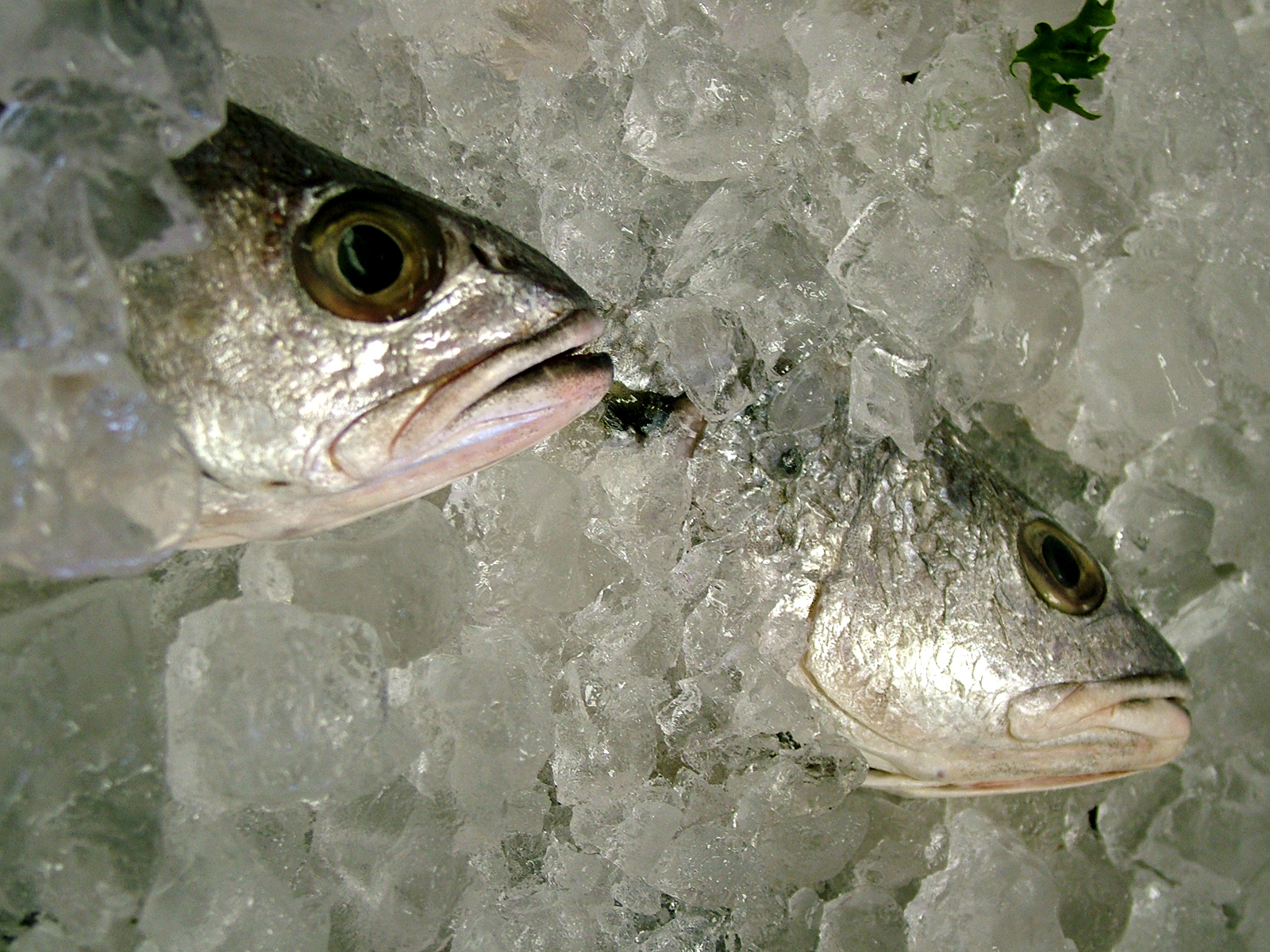
Fish packed in ice

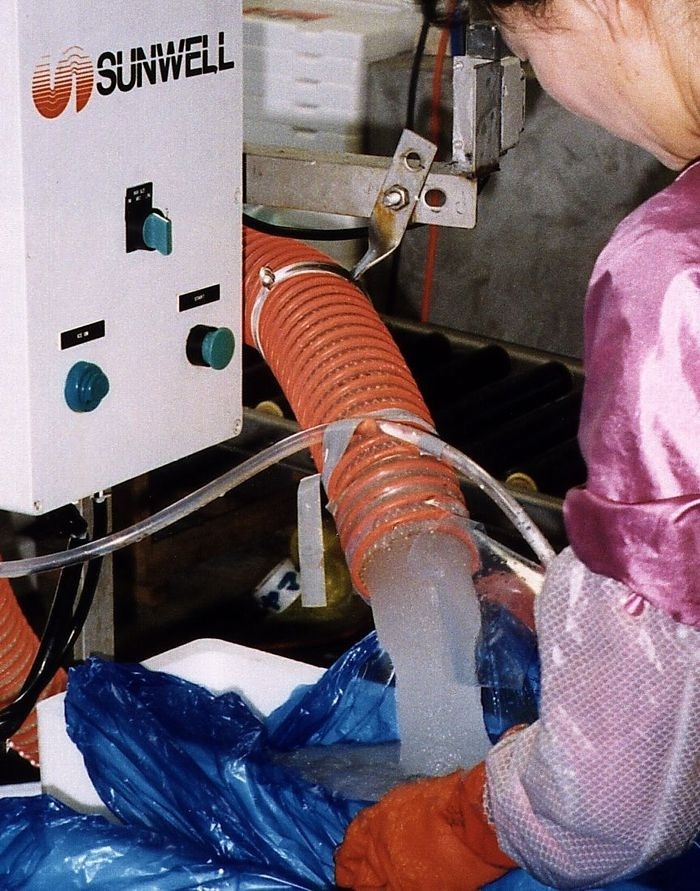
Fish chilling with slurry ice.

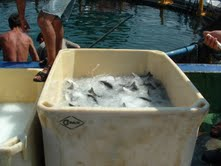
Fish cooling by pumpable ice

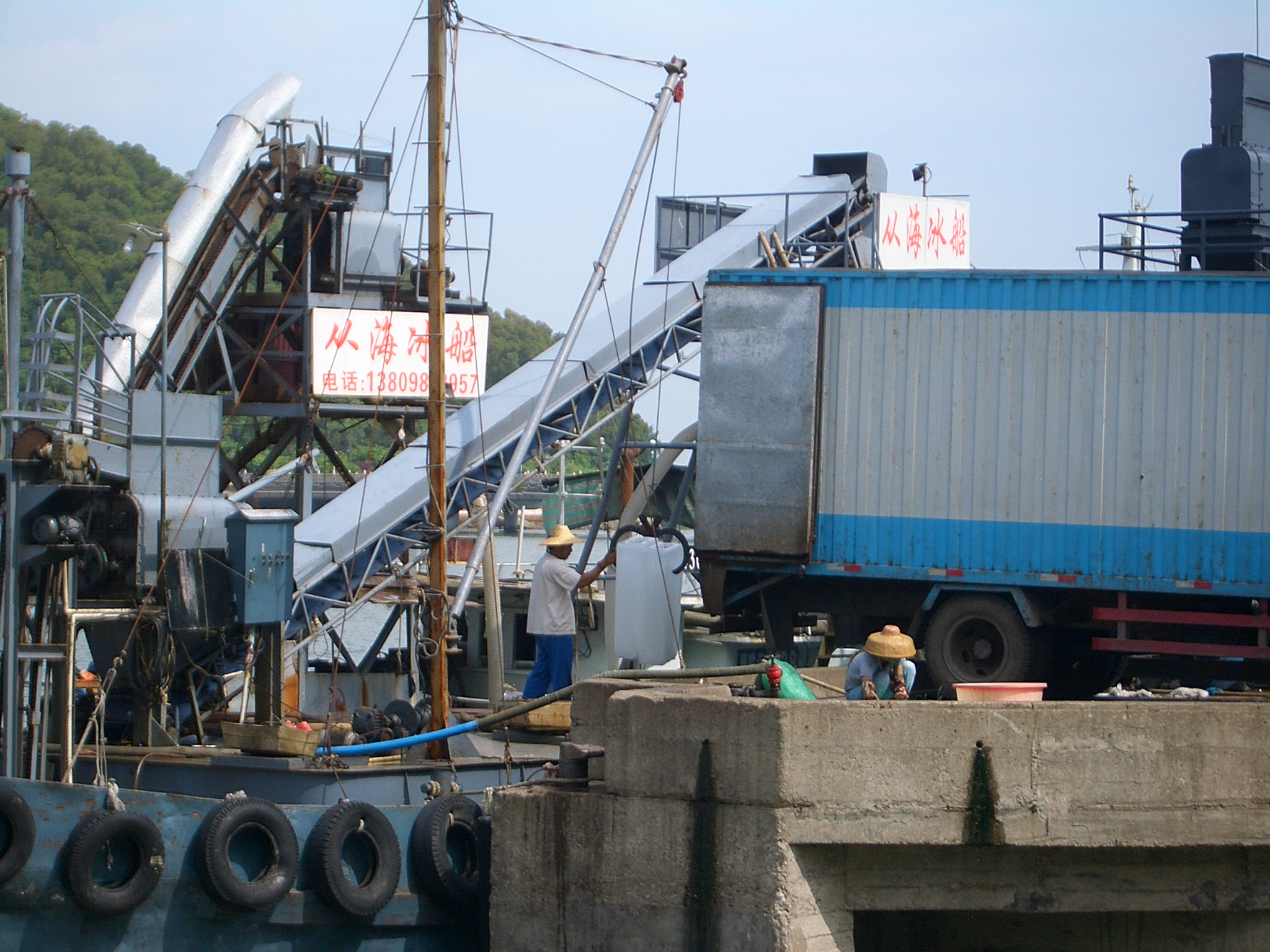
Loading blocks of factory-made ice from a truck to an "ice depot" boat

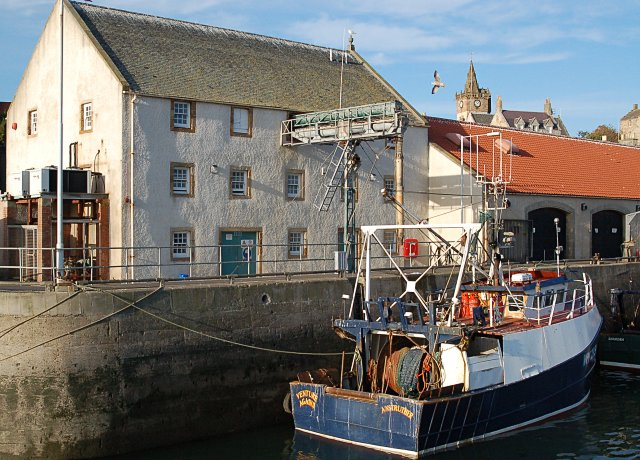
Ice manufactured in this ice house is delivered down the Archimedes screw into the ice hold on the boat, Pittenweem

== Control of water activity ==
The water activity, a_{w}, in a fish is defined as the ratio of the water vapour pressure in the flesh of the fish to the vapour pressure of pure water at the same temperature and pressure. It ranges between 0 and 1, and is a parameter that measures how available the water is in the flesh of the fish. Available water is necessary for the microbial and enzymatic reactions involved in spoilage. There are a number of techniques that have been or are used to tie up the available water or remove it by reducing the a_{w}. Traditionally, techniques such as drying, salting and smoking have been used, and have been used for thousands of years. These techniques can be very simple, for example, by using solar drying. In more recent times, freeze-drying, water-binding humectants, and fully automated equipment with temperature and humidity control have been added. Often a combination of these techniques is used.

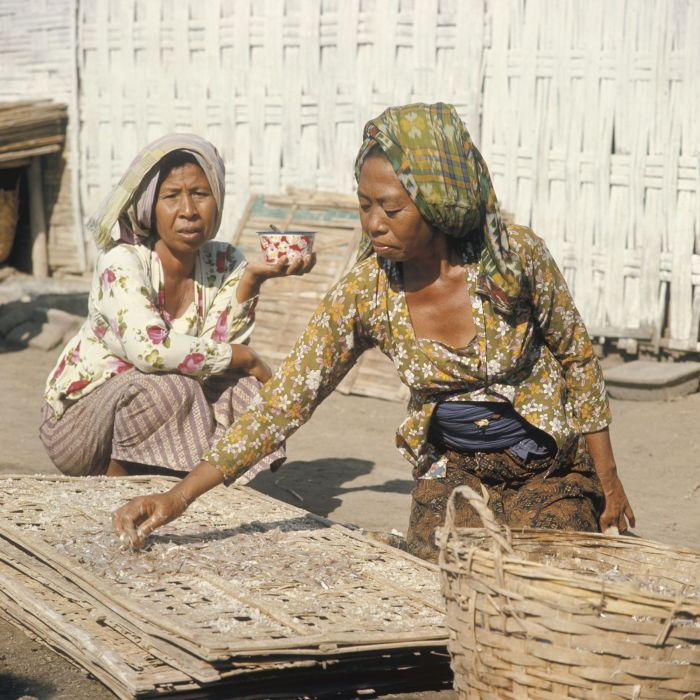
Women drying fish in Indonesia, 1971

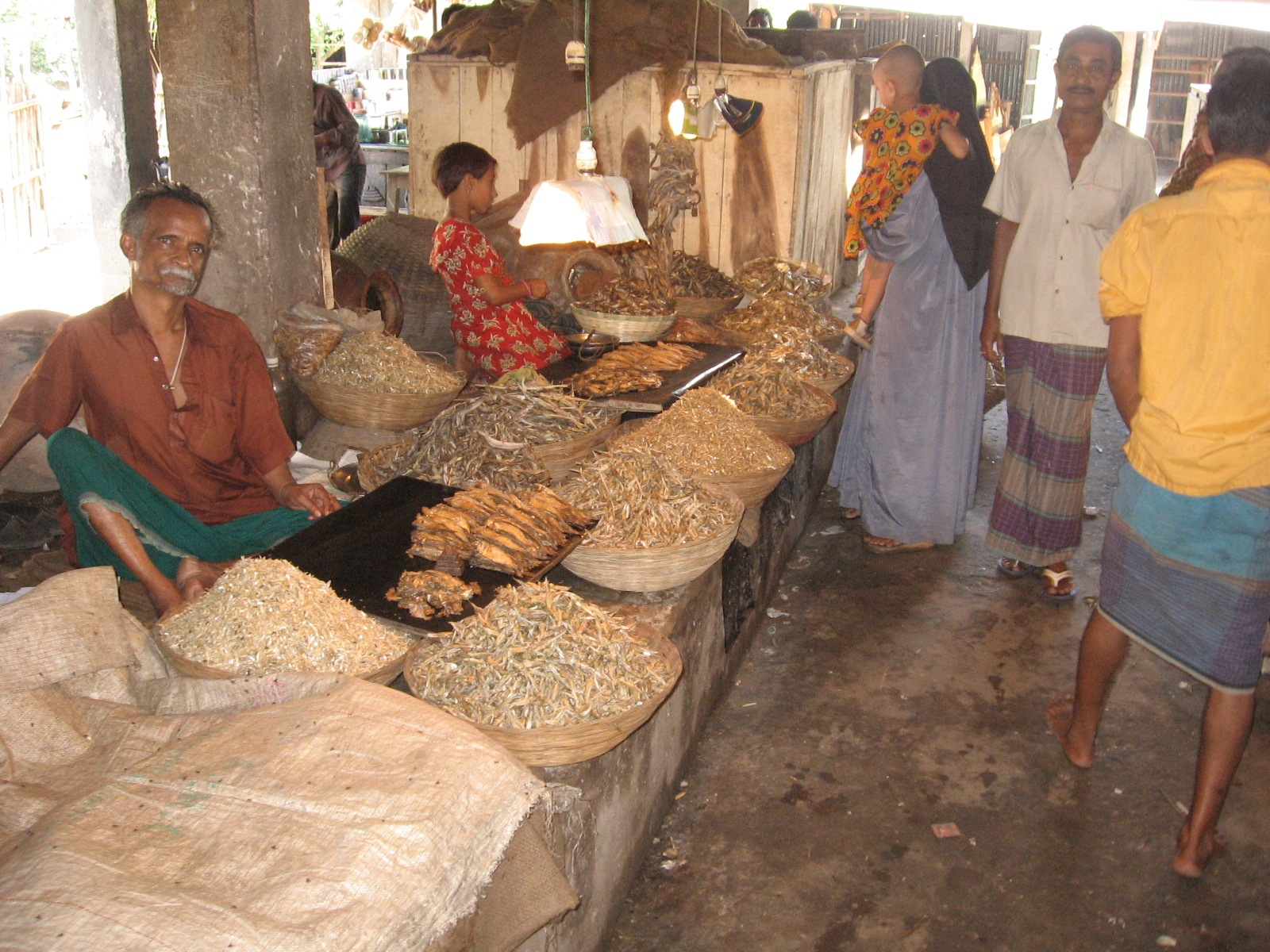
Dry fish market at Mohanganj

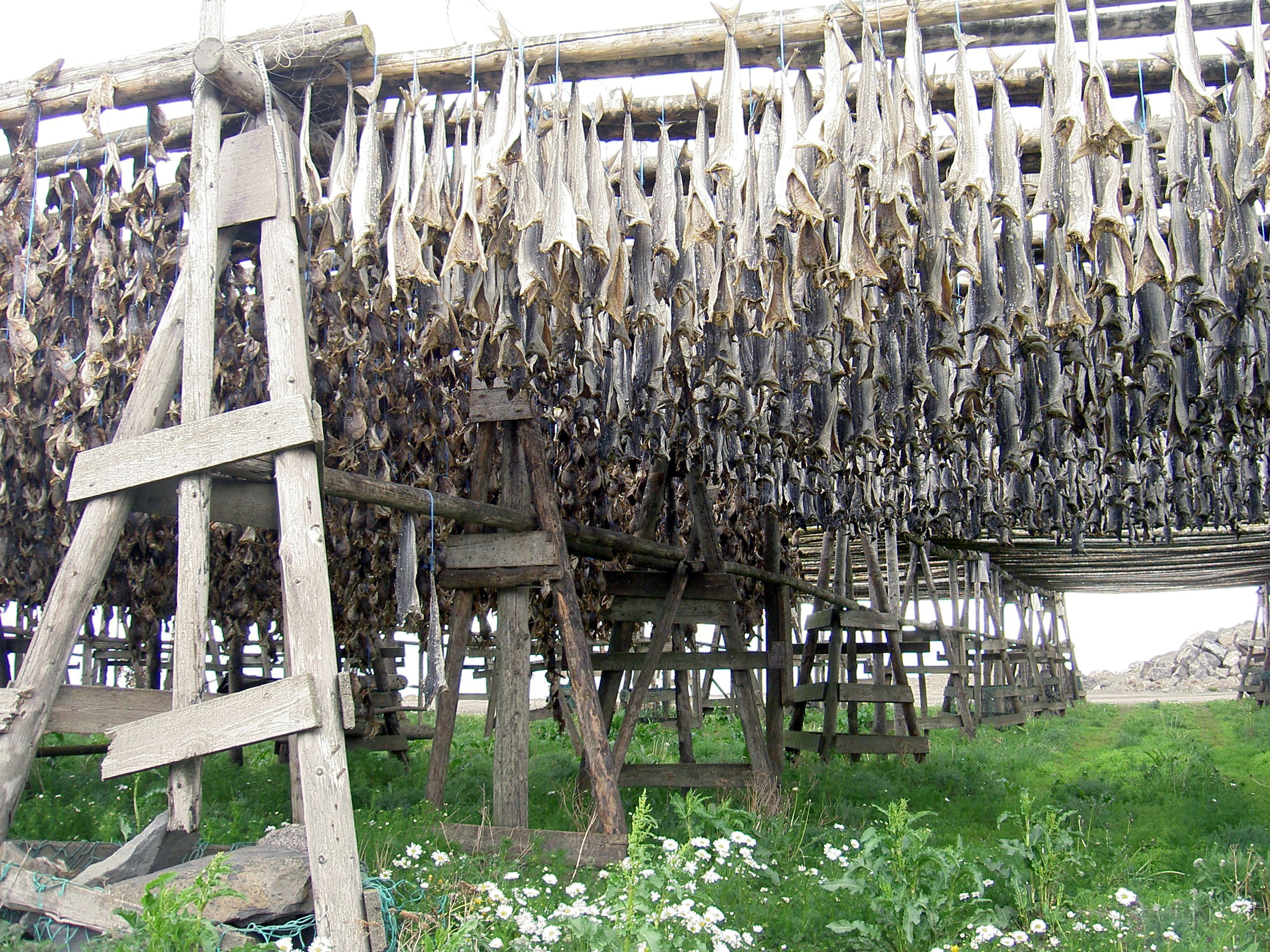
Drying stockfish in Iceland

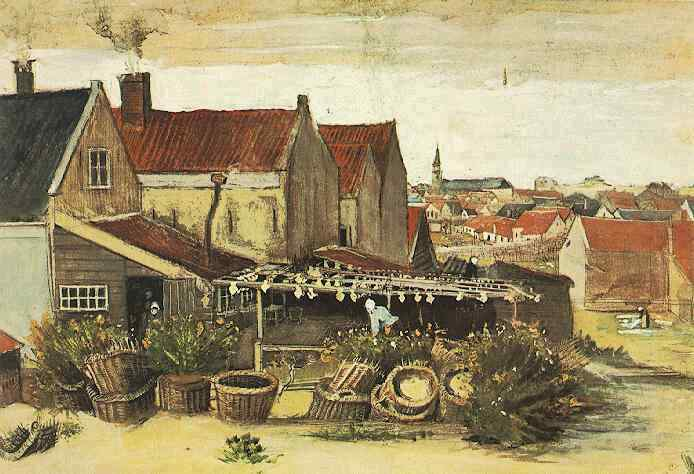
Fish barn with fish drying in the sun – Van Gogh 1882.

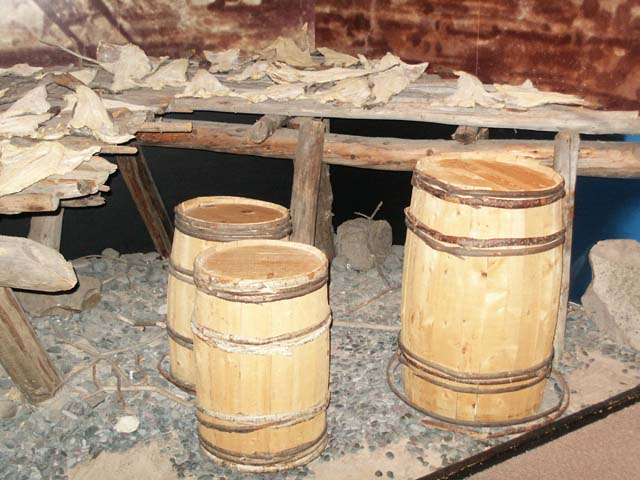
Platforms, called fish flakes, where cod dry in the sun before being packed in salt

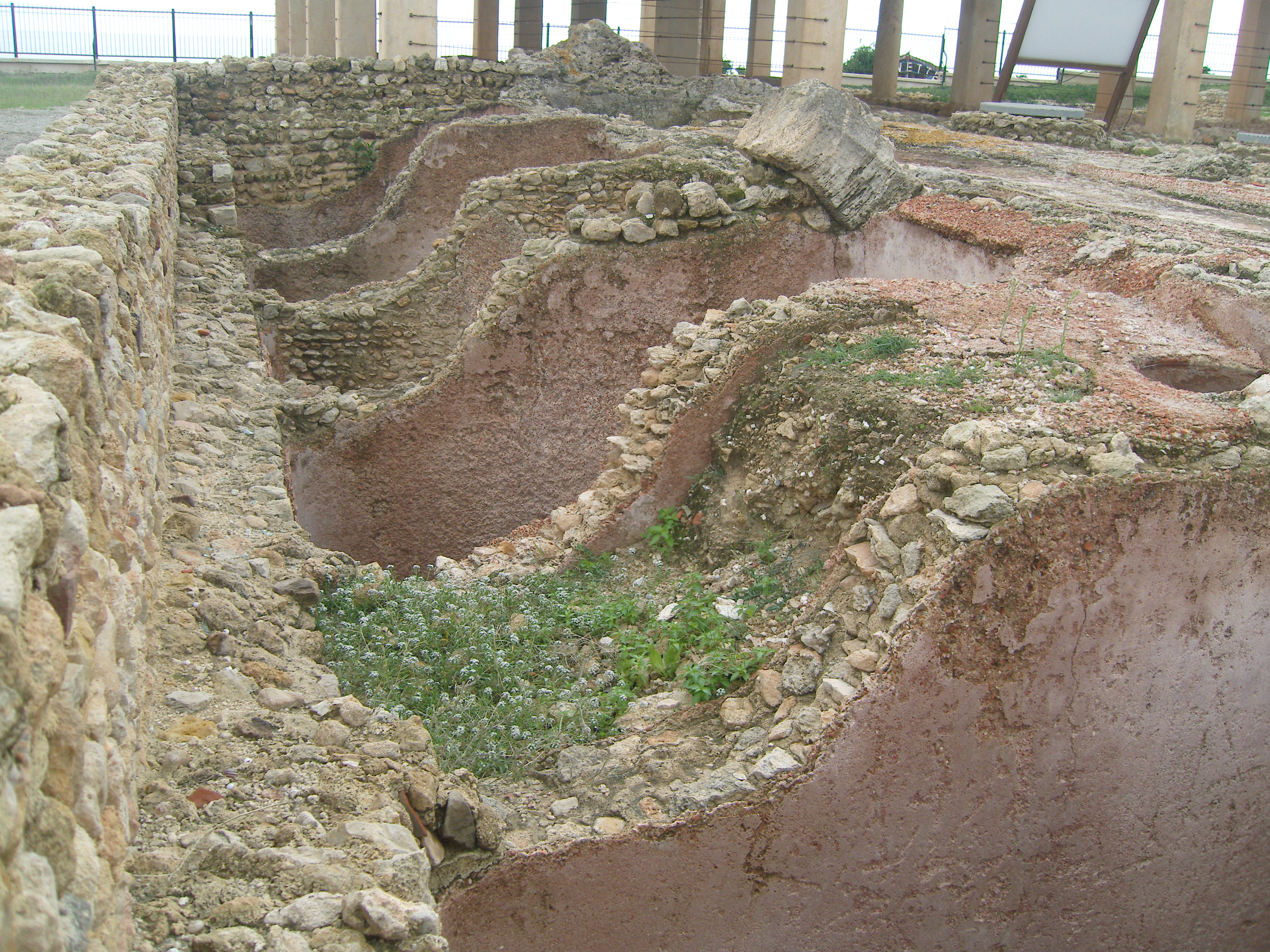
Remains of Roman fish-salting plant at Neapolis

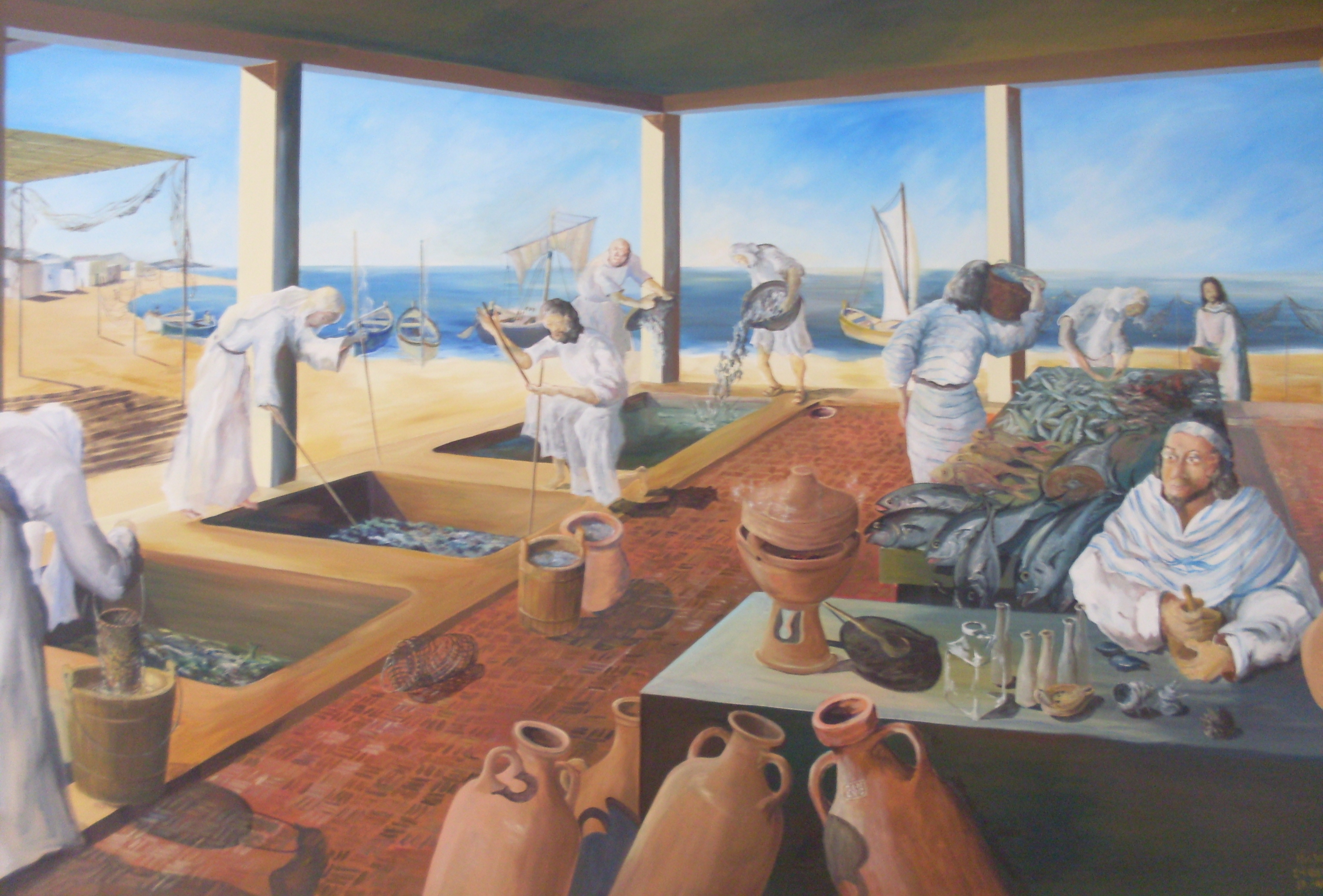
Reconstruction of the Roman fish-salting plant at Neapolis

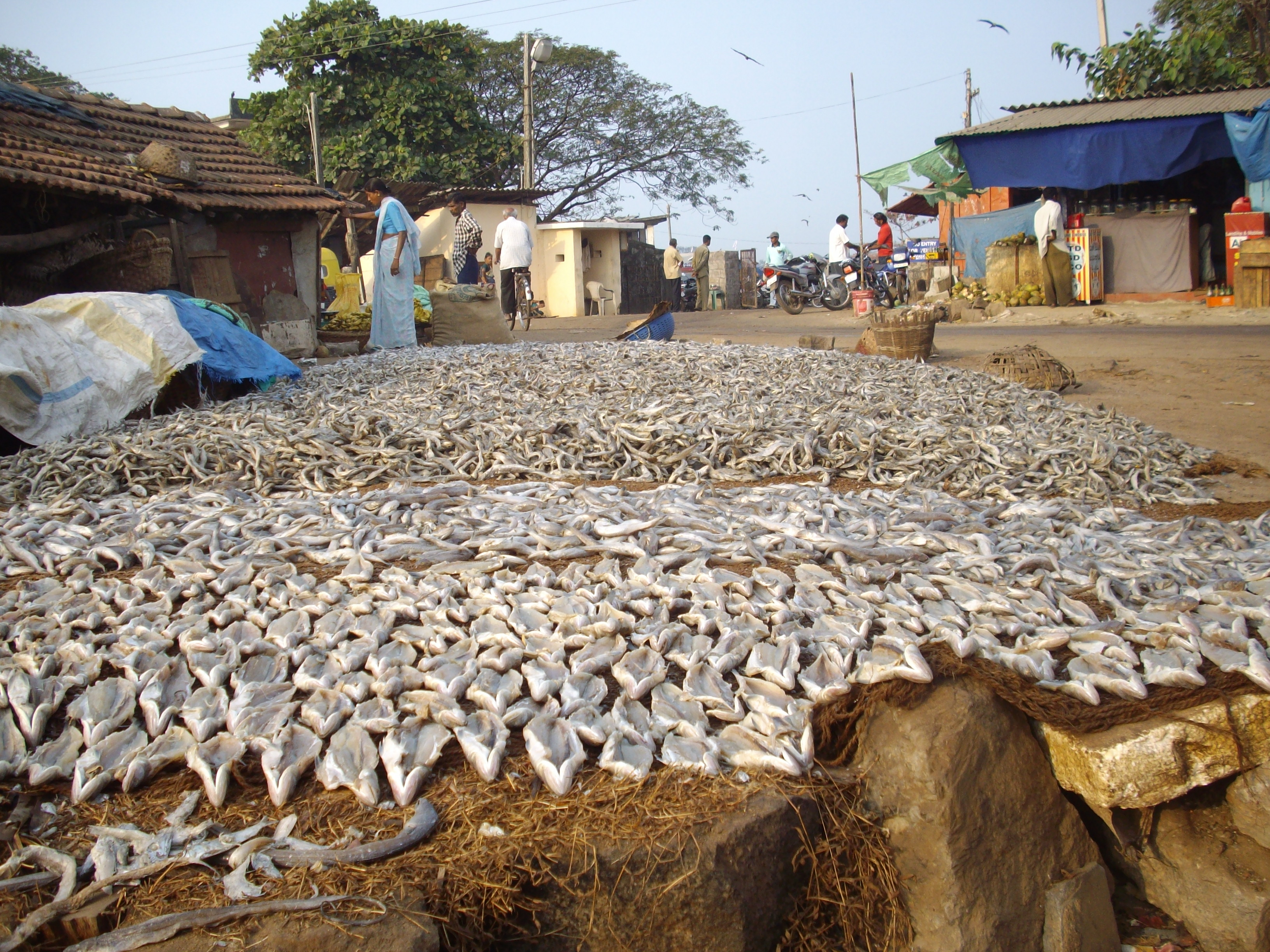
Drying salted fish at Malpe Harbour

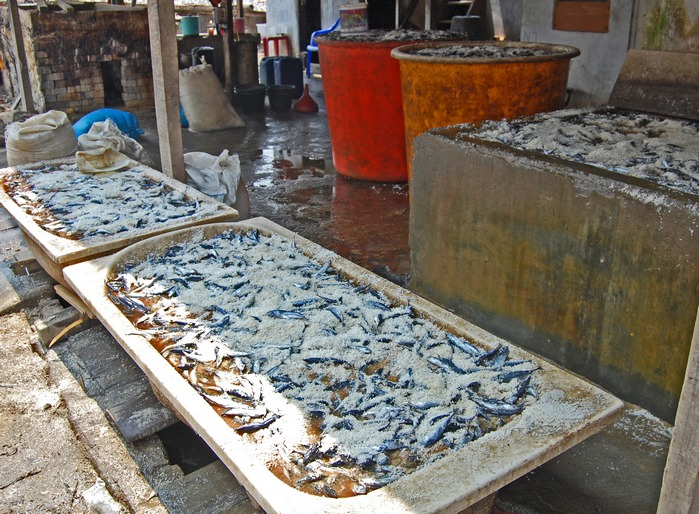
Salt fish dip at Jakarta

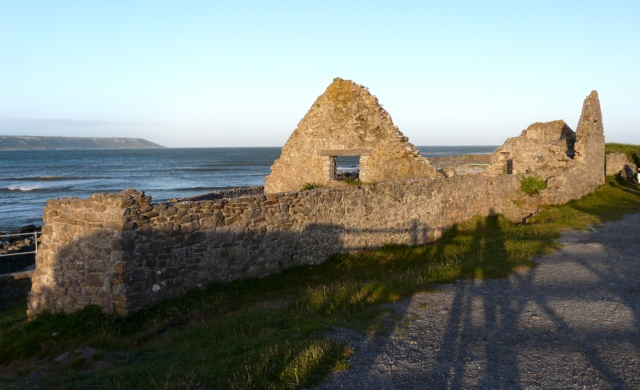
Ruins of the Port Eynon Salt House – seawater was boiled to extract salt for preserving fish

== Physical control of microbial loads ==
Heat or ionizing irradiation can be used to kill the bacteria that cause decomposition. Heat is applied by cooking, blanching or microwave heating in a manner that pasteurizes or sterilizes fish products. Cooking or pasteurizing does not completely inactivate microorganisms and may need to be followed with refrigeration to preserve fish products and increase their shelf life. Sterilised products are stable at ambient temperatures up to 40 °C, but to ensure they remain sterilized they need packaging in metal cans or retortable pouches before the heat treatment.

== Chemical control of microbial loads ==
Microbial growth and proliferation can be inhibited by a technique called biopreservation. Biopreservation is achieved by adding antimicrobials or by increasing the acidity of the fish muscle. Most bacteria stop multiplying when the pH is less than 4.5. Acidity is increased by fermentation, marination or by directly adding acids (acetic, citric, lactic) to fish products. Lactic acid bacteria produce the antimicrobial nisin which further enhances preservation. Other preservatives include nitrites, sulphites, sorbates, benzoates and essential oils.

== Control of the oxygen reduction potential ==
Spoilage bacteria and lipid oxidation usually need oxygen, so reducing the oxygen around fish can increase shelf life. This is done by controlling or modifying the atmosphere around the fish, or by vacuum packaging. Controlled or modified atmospheres have specific combinations of oxygen, carbon dioxide and nitrogen, and the method is often combined with refrigeration for more effective fish preservation.

== Combined techniques ==
Two or more of these techniques are often combined. This can improve preservation and reduce unwanted side effects such as the denaturation of nutrients by severe heat treatments. Common combinations are salting/drying, salting/marinating, salting/smoking, drying/smoking, pasteurization/refrigeration and controlled atmosphere/refrigeration. Other process combinations are currently being developed along the multiple hurdle theory.

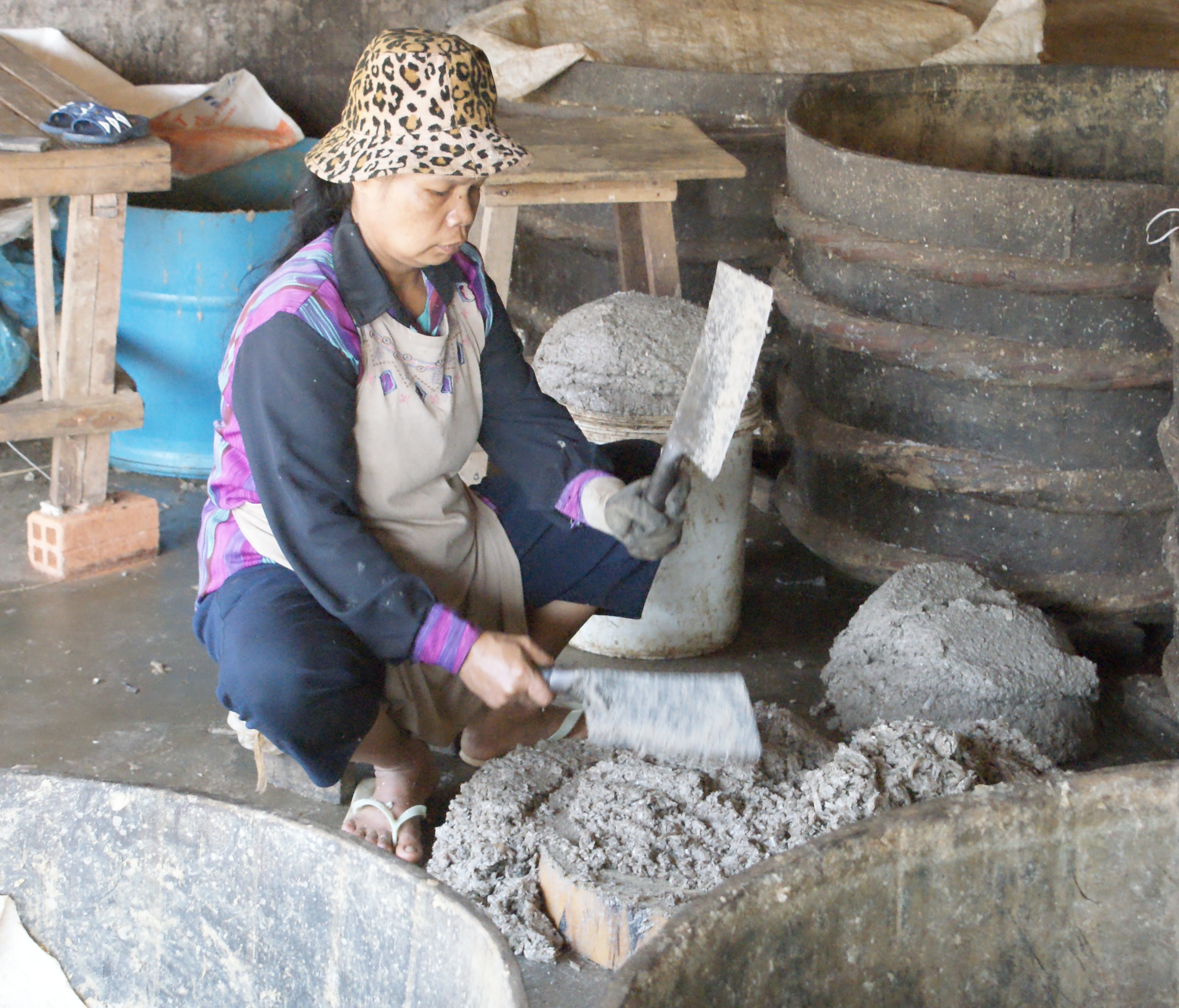
Making fish paste in Cambodia

See:

- Haddock: Arbroath Smokie (lightly smoked).
- Herring: kipper (salted and smoked), surströmming (fermented), rollmops (pickled), soused (salted).
- Salmon: smoked salmon, cured salmon, and gravlax (fermented).
- Cod: stockfish (air dried), lutefisk (soaked in lye).

== See also ==
- Fish processing
- Dried shrimp
- List of smoked foods
- Sharks fin
