= Kipper =

Whole cold-smoked herring

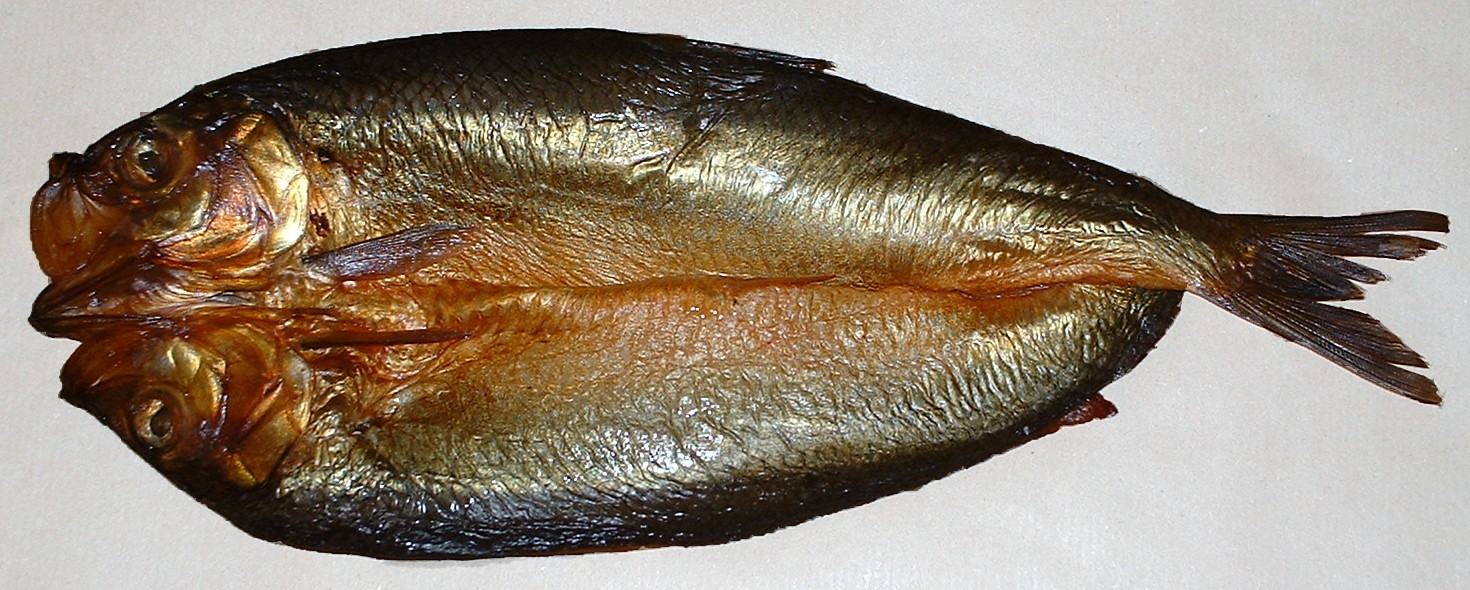
Kippered "split" herring

A kipper is a whole herring (a small, oily fish) that has been split in a butterfly fashion from tail to head along the dorsal ridge, gutted, salted or pickled, and cold-smoked over smouldering wood chips (typically oak).

In the United Kingdom, Ireland and some regions of North America, kippers are most commonly eaten for breakfast. In the United Kingdom, kippers, along with other preserved smoked or salted fish such as the bloater and buckling, were also once commonly consumed as a high tea or supper treat, most popularly with inland and urban working-class populations before World War II.

== Terminology ==
The word is thought to derive from the Old English cypera, or copper, based on the colour of the fish. The word has various possible parallels, such as Icelandic kippa which means "to pull, snatch" and the Germanic word kippen which means "to tilt, to incline". Similarly, the Middle English kipe denotes a basket used to catch fish. Another theory traces the word kipper to the kip, or small beak, that male salmon develop during the breeding season.

As a verb, kippering ("to kipper") means to preserve by rubbing with salt or other spices before drying in the open air or in smoke. Originally applied to the preservation of surplus fish (particularly those known as "kips," harvested during spawning runs), kippering has come to mean the preservation of any fish, poultry, beef or other meat in like manner. The process is usually enhanced by cleaning, filleting, butterflying or slicing the food to expose maximum surface area to the drying and preservative agents.

=== Kippers, bloaters, and bucklings ===
All three are types of smoked herring. Kippers are split, gutted and then cold-smoked; bloaters are cold-smoked whole; bucklings are hot-smoked whole.

== Origin ==
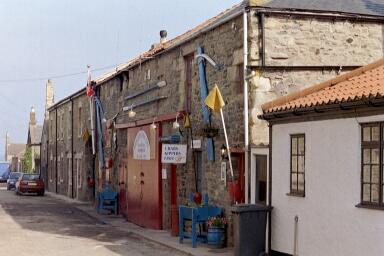
The fish processing factory in the village of Seahouses, Northumberland, is one of the places where the practice of kippering herrings is said to have originated.

Although the exact origin of the kipper is unknown, this process of slitting, gutting, and smoke-curing fish is well documented. (Note: The practice of smoking salmon for preservation was seen by Lewis and Clark among American Indians of the Columbia River region.) According to Mark Kurlansky, "Smoked foods almost always carry with them legends about their having been created by accident—usually the peasant hung the food too close to the fire, and then, imagine his surprise the next morning when …". For instance Thomas Nashe wrote in 1599 about a fisherman from Lothingland in the Great Yarmouth area who discovered smoking herring by accident. Another story of the accidental invention of kipper is set in 1843, with John Woodger of Seahouses in Northumberland, when fish for processing was left overnight in a room with a smoking stove.

== Colouring ==
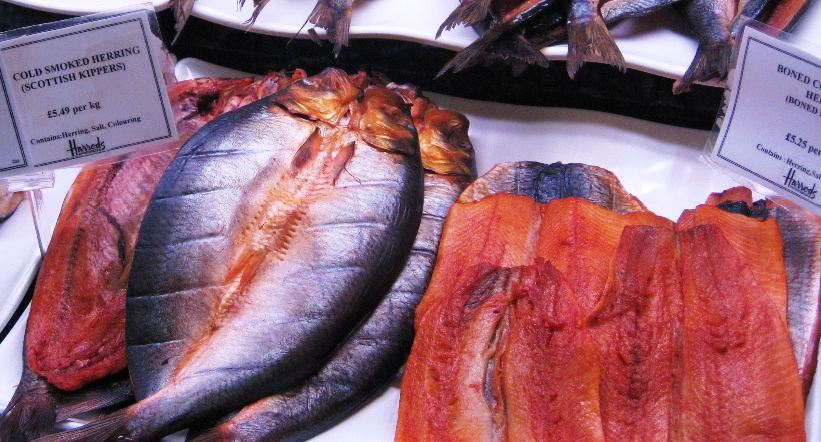
"Red herring": Cold-smoked herring (Scottish kippers), brined and dyed so that their flesh achieves a reddish colour

A kipper is also sometimes referred to as a red herring, although particularly strong curing is required to produce a truly red kipper. The term appears in a mid-13th-century poem by the Anglo-Norman poet Walter of Bibbesworth, "He eteþ no ffyssh But heryng red." Samuel Pepys used it in his diary entry of 28 February 1660: "Up in the morning, and had some red herrings to our breakfast, while my boot-heel was a-mending, by the same token the boy left the hole as big as it was before."

The dyeing of kippers was introduced as an economy measure in the First World War by avoiding the need for the long smoking processes. This allowed the kippers to be sold quickly, easily and for a substantially greater profit. Kippers were originally dyed using a coal tar dye called brown FK (the FK is an abbreviation of "for kippers"), kipper brown or kipper dye. Today, kippers are usually brine-dyed using a natural annatto dye, giving the fish a deeper orange/yellow colour. European Community legislation limits the acceptable daily intake (ADI) of Brown FK to 0.15 mg/kg. Not all fish caught are suitable for the dyeing process, with mature fish more readily sought, because the density of their flesh improves the absorption of the dye. An orange kipper is a kipper that has been dyed orange.

Kippers from the Isle of Man and some Scottish producers are not dyed; instead, the smoking time is extended in the traditional manner.

== Preparation ==
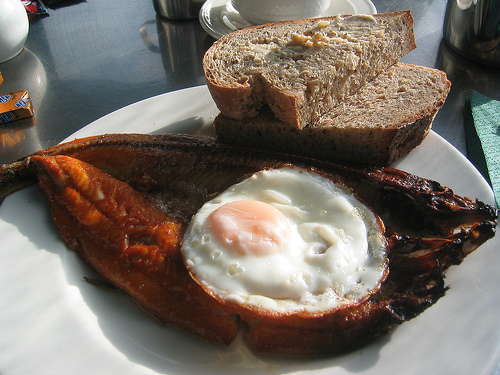
Kippers for breakfast in England, served with a fried egg and bread

"Cold-smoked" fish that have not been salted for preservation must be cooked before being eaten safely (they can be boiled, fried, grilled, jugged or roasted, for instance). In general, oily fish are preferred for smoking as the heat is evenly dispersed by the oil, and the flesh resists flaking apart like drier species.

In the UK, kippers are usually served at breakfast, although their popularity has declined since the Victorian and Edwardian eras.

In the United States, where kippers are much less commonly eaten than in the UK, they are almost always sold as either canned "kipper snacks" or in jars found in the refrigerated foods section. These are precooked and may be eaten without further preparation.

== Industry ==
Kippers produced in the Isle of Man are exported around the world. Thousands are produced annually in the town of Peel, where two kipper houses, Moore's Kipper Yard (founded 1882) and Devereau and Son (founded 1884), smoke and export herring.

Mallaig, once the busiest herring port in Europe, is famous for its traditionally smoked kippers, as are Stornoway kippers and Loch Fyne kippers. The harbour village of Craster in Northumberland is famed for Craster kippers, which are prepared in a local smokehouse, sold in the village shop and exported around the world.

== Related terms ==
The Manx term skeddan jiarg means “red herring”.

Kipper time is the season in which fishing for salmon in the River Thames in the United Kingdom is forbidden by an Act of Parliament; this period was originally the period 3 May to 6 January but has changed since. Kipper season refers (particularly among fairground workers, market workers, taxi drivers and the like) to any lean period in trade, particularly the first three or four months of the year.

Members of the Canadian military referred to English people as kippers because they were believed to frequently eat kippers for breakfast.

The English (UK) idiom [to be] "stitched (or "done") up like a kipper" is commonly used to describe a situation where a person has (depending on context) been "fitted up" or "framed"; "used", unfairly treated or betrayed; or cheated out of something, with no possibility of correcting the "wrong" done.

In the children's books The Railway Series, and in the television show Thomas the Tank Engine and Friends, The Flying Kipper is a nickname for a fast fish train usually pulled by Henry the Green Engine.

The United States Department of Agriculture defines "Kippered Beef" as a cured dry product similar to beef jerky but not as dry.

== See also ==
- Fish preservation
- Herring as food
- Kipper tie
- List of dried foods
- List of smoked foods
- Red herring, a term for an irrelevant distraction
- Smoked fish
- Solomon Gundy
