= Solomon Gundy =

Jamaican spiced pickled herring pâté

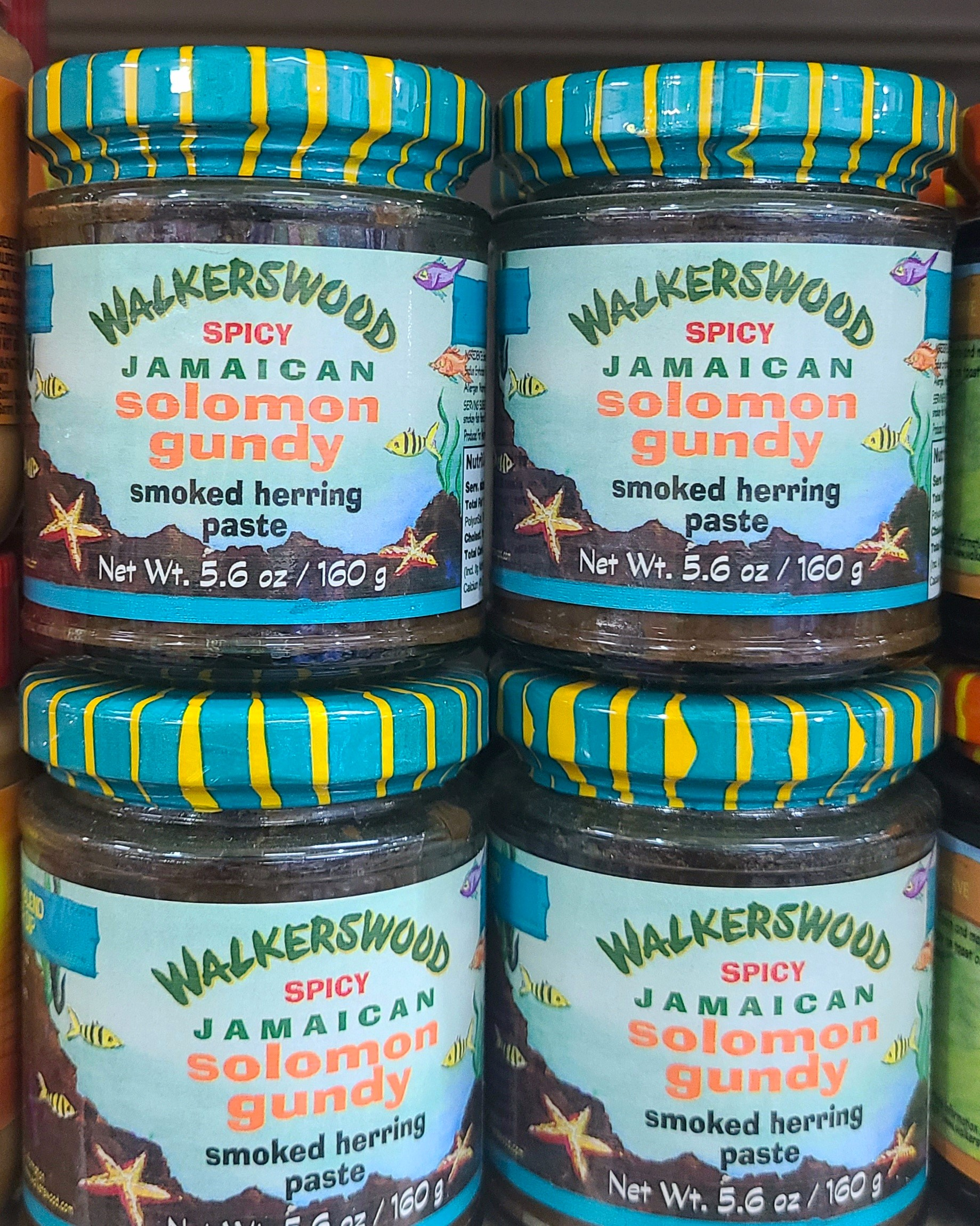
- Jamaican Solomon Gundy— smoked herring pâté, typically eaten with crackers.
- Type: Pâté
- Place of origin: Jamaica
- Main ingredients: Smoked fish (usually red herring) and chili peppers.

Solomon Gundy is a spicy Jamaican pickled (salted) fish pâté, usually served with crackers as an appetizer or hors d’oeuvre.

== Etymology ==
Solomon Gundy may have been derived from the British word "salmagundi", used to refer to a salad of many different ingredients. The term is originally from the French word "salmigondis", which refers to a disparate assembly of things, ideas, or people forming an incoherent whole (a hodgepodge).

== Preparation ==
The pâté is usually made with smoked and salted red herring, but other fish such as mackerel and shad are used sometimes. The fish is soaked or boiled in water to remove excess salt, and then deboned, minced or puréed until smooth. It is made with native scotch bonnet peppers and allspice, onion, scallion, vinegar, sugar and other herbs or seasonings. It is typically served with crackers or bread, but may be served with tostones.

The dish appears on the menus of Jamaican restaurants and resorts, but is commonly sold and consumed as a snack at Jamaican bars. Solomon gundy is also sold as a packaged food for export.

== See also ==
- Pickled herring
- List of Jamaican dishes and foods
- Pâté

== Sources ==
- DeMers, John; Fuss, Eduardo (1998). The food of Jamaica: authentic recipes from the jewel of the Caribbean. Tuttle Publishing. p. 123. ISBN 962-593-401-4.
