= Smoking (cooking) =

Exposing food to smoke to flavor or preserve it

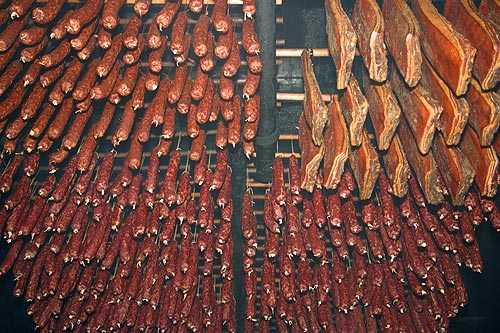
Meat hanging inside a smokehouse in Switzerland

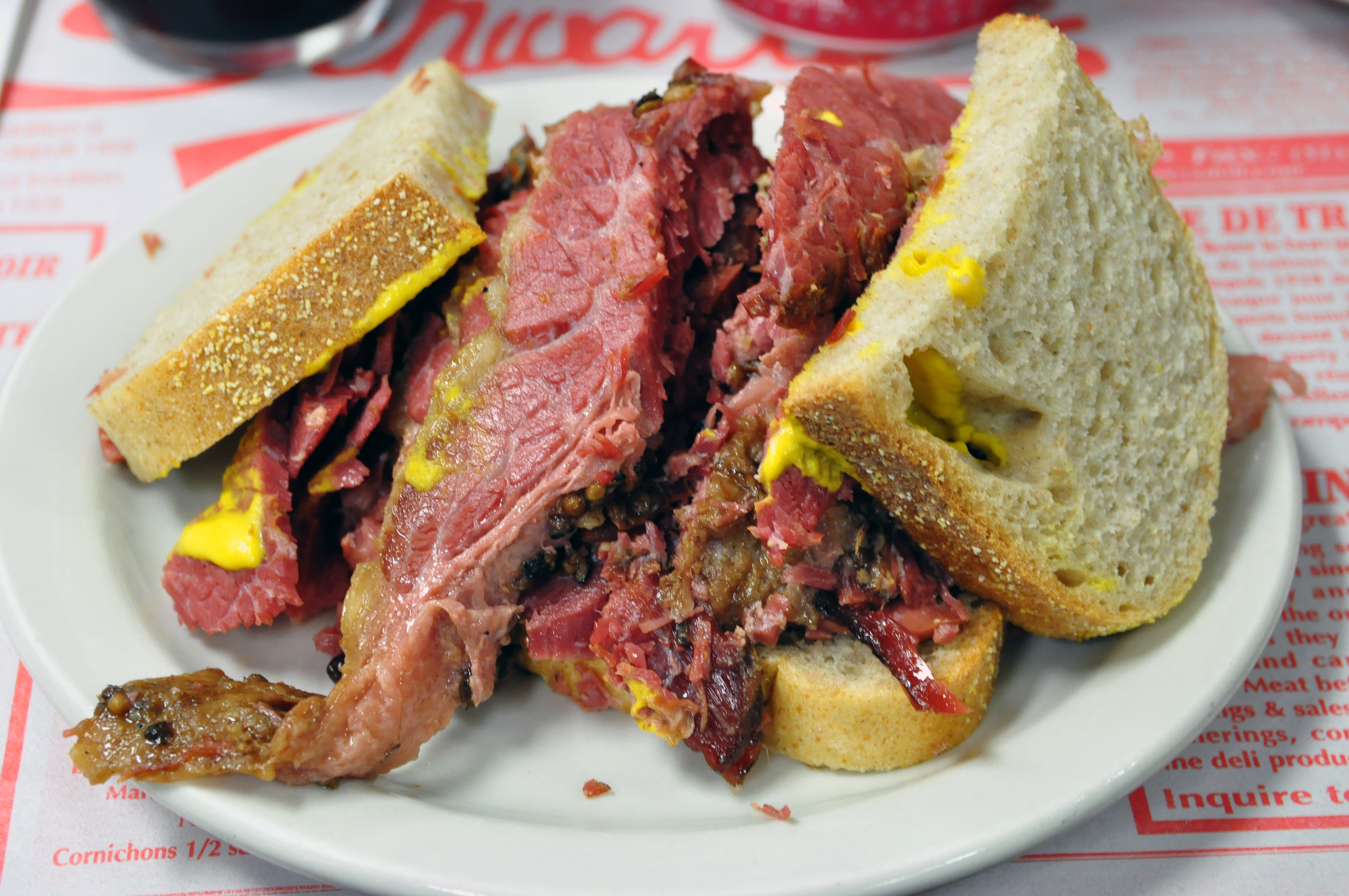
A Montreal smoked meat sandwich

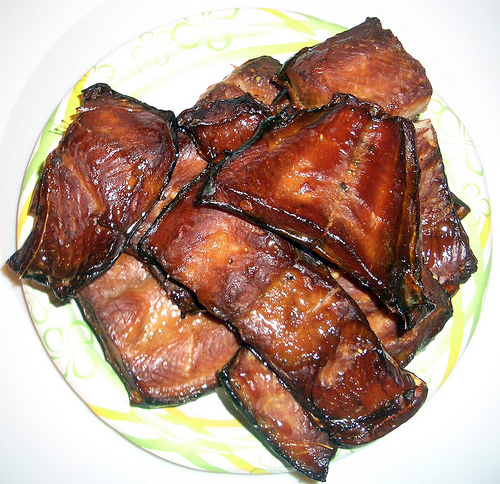
Hot-smoked chum salmon

Smoking is the process of flavoring, browning, cooking, or preserving food, particularly meat, fish and tea, by exposing it to smoke from burning or smoldering material, most often wood.

In Europe, alder is the traditional smoking wood, but oak is now more commonly used, while beech is used to a lesser extent than both oak and alder. In North America, hickory, mesquite, oak, pecan, alder, maple, and fruit tree woods, such as apple, cherry, and plum, are commonly used for smoking. Other biomass besides wood can also be employed, sometimes with the addition of flavoring ingredients. Chinese tea-smoking uses a mixture of uncooked rice, sugar, and tea, heated at the base of a wok.

Some North American ham and bacon makers smoke their products over burning corncobs. Peat is burned to dry and smoke the barley malt used to make Scotch whisky and some beers. In New Zealand, sawdust from the native mānuka (tea tree) is commonly used for hot-smoking fish. In Iceland, dried sheep dung is used to cold-smoke fish, lamb, mutton, and whale.

Historically, farms in the West included a smokehouse, a small building where meats could be smoked and stored. This was generally well separated from other buildings both because of fire danger and smoke emanations. The smoking of food may possibly introduce polycyclic aromatic hydrocarbons, which may lead to an increased risk of some types of cancer; however, this association is debated.

Food can be smoked by cold smoking, warm smoking or hot smoking. However, these methods of imparting smoke only affect the food surface, and are unable to preserve food, thus, smoking is paired with other microbial hurdles, such as chilling and packaging, to extend food shelf-life. Smoke-like flavor can be added by flavorings such as liquid smoke.

== History ==
The smoking of food likely dates back to the Paleolithic era. This process was later combined with pre-curing the food in salt or salty brine, resulting in a remarkably effective preservation process that was adapted and developed by numerous cultures around the world. Until the modern era, smoking was of a more "heavy duty" nature as the main goal was to preserve the food. Large quantities of salt were used in the curing process and smoking times were quite long, sometimes involving days of exposure.

The advent of modern transportation made it easier to transport food products over long distances and the need for the time and material intensive heavy salting and smoking declined. Smoking became more of a way to flavor than to preserve food. In 1939 a device called the Torry Kiln was invented at the Torry Research Station in Scotland. The kiln allowed for uniform mass-smoking and is considered the prototype for all modern large-scale commercial smokers. Although refinements in technique and advancements in technology have made smoking much easier, the basic steps involved remain essentially the same today as they were hundreds if not thousands of years ago.

== Types by method of application ==
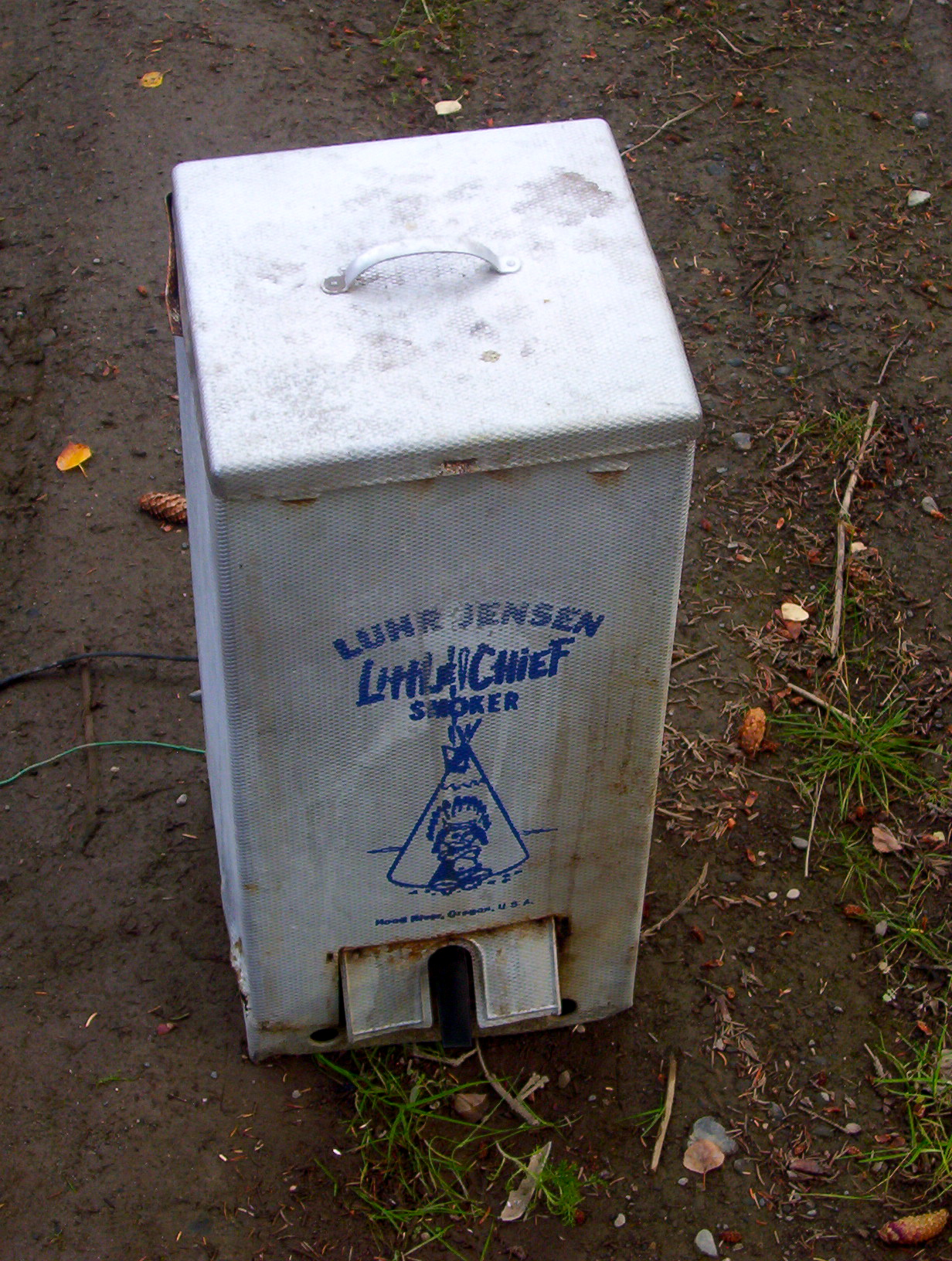
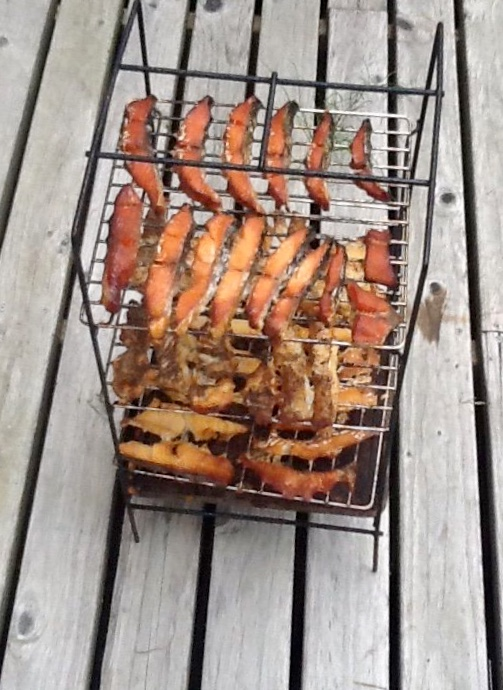
A "Little Chief" home smoker and racks with hot smoked Pacific salmon

=== Cold smoking ===
Cold smoking differs from hot smoking in that it does not cook anything; when cold smoking is finished, the food is still raw. Smokehouse temperatures for cold smoking are typically between 20 and 30 °C (68 and 86 °F). In this temperature range, foods take on a smoked flavor, but remain relatively moist. Since cold smoking does not cook foods, meats should be fully cured before cold smoking. Cold smoking can be used as a flavor enhancer for items such as cheese or nuts, along with meats such as chicken breasts, beef, pork chops, salmon, scallops, and steak. The item is often hung in a dry environment first to develop a pellicle; it can then be cold smoked up to several days to ensure it absorbs the smoke flavor. Some cold smoked foods are baked, grilled, steamed, roasted, or sautéed before eating.

Cold smoking meats should not be attempted at home, according to the US National Center for Home Food Preservation: "Most food scientists cannot recommend cold-smoking methods because of the inherent risks."

Cold smoking meats should only be attempted by personnel certified in HACCP [...] to ensure that it is safely prepared.

=== Warm smoking ===
Warm smoking exposes foods to temperatures of 25–40 °C (77–104 °F).

=== Hot smoking ===
Hot smoking cooks foods and simultaneously flavors them with smoke in a controlled environment such as a smoker oven or smokehouse. It requires consistent control of both the temperature of the food and the amount of smoke being applied to it. Some smokers have a heat source built into them, while others use the heat from a stove-top or oven. Like cold smoking, the item may be hung first to develop a pellicle; it is then smoked from 1 hour to as long as 24 hours. Although foods that have been hot smoked are often reheated or further cooked, they are typically safe to eat without further cooking. The temperature range for hot smoking is usually between 52 and 80 °C (126 and 176 °F). Foods smoked in this temperature range are usually fully cooked, but still moist and flavorful. At smoker temperatures hotter than 85 °C (185 °F), foods can shrink excessively, buckle, or even split. Smoking at high temperatures also reduces yield, as both moisture and fat are cooked away.

=== Liquid smoke ===
Liquid smoke, a product derived from smoke compounds in water, is applied to foods through spraying or dipping.

=== Smoke roasting ===
Smoke-roasting refers to any process that has the attributes of both roasting and smoking. This smoking method is sometimes referred to as barbecuing or pit-roasting. It may be done in a smoke-roaster, a closed wood-fired oven, or a barbecue pit, any smoker that can reach above 121 °C (250 °F), or in a conventional oven by placing a pan filled with hardwood chips on the floor of the oven so that the chips can smolder and produce a smoke-bath. In North America, this smoking method is commonly referred to as "barbecuing", "pit baking", or "pit roasting".

== Types of fuel ==
=== Wood smoke ===
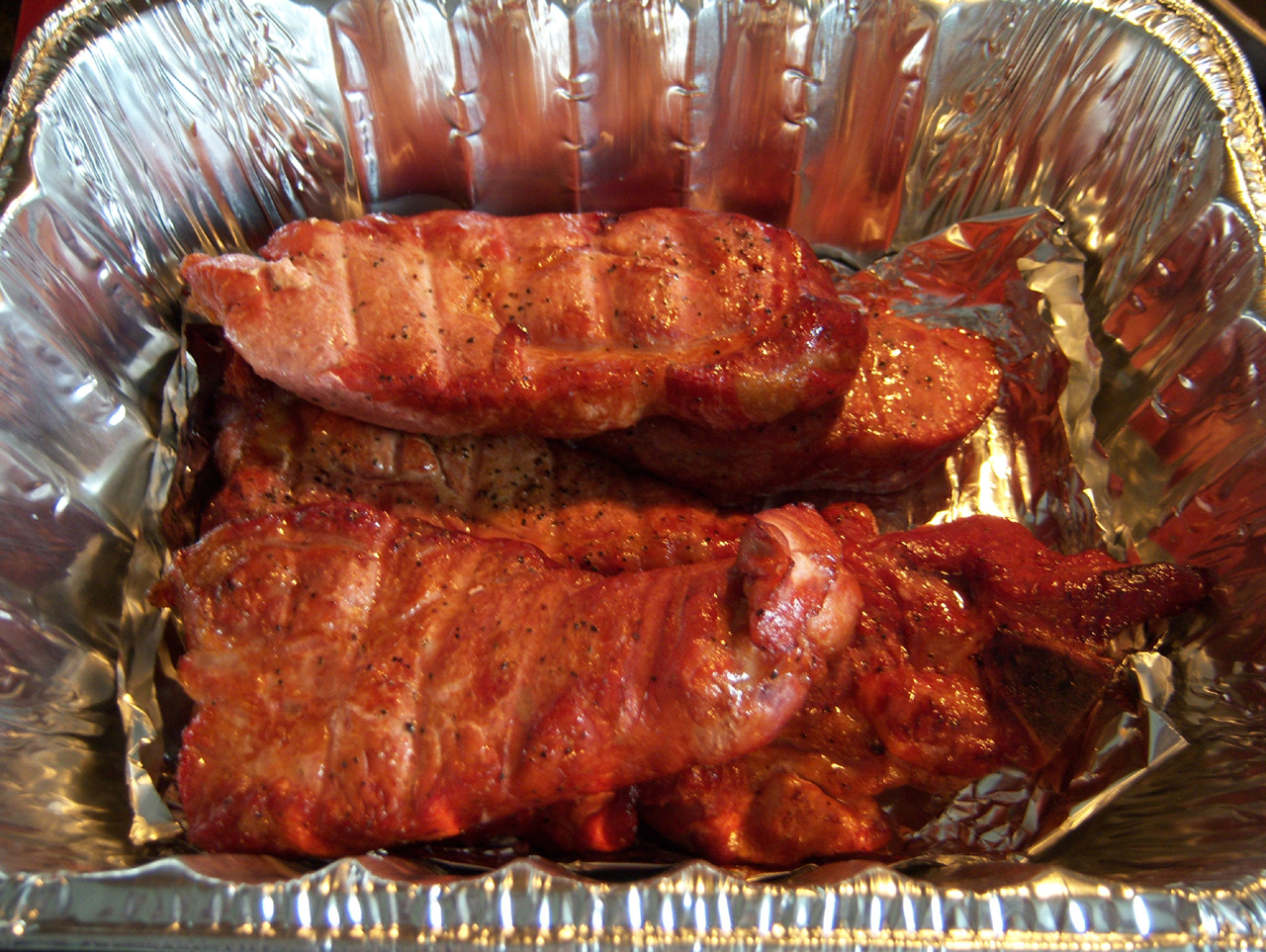
Hickory-smoked country-style ribs

Hardwoods are made up mostly of three materials: cellulose, hemicellulose, and lignin. Cellulose and hemicellulose are the basic structural material of the wood cells; lignin acts as a kind of cell-bonding glue. Some softwoods, especially pines and firs, hold significant quantities of resin, which produces a harsh-tasting soot when burned; these woods are not often used for smoking.

Cellulose and hemicellulose are aggregate sugar molecules; when burnt, they effectively caramelize, producing carbonyls, which provide most of the color components and sweet, flowery, and fruity aromas. Lignin, a highly complex arrangement of interlocked phenolic molecules, also produces a number of distinctive aromatic elements when burnt, including smoky, spicy, and pungent compounds such as guaiacol, phenol, and syringol, and sweeter scents such as the vanilla-scented vanillin and clove-like isoeugenol. Guaiacol is the phenolic compound most responsible for the "smoky" taste, while syringol is the primary contributor to smoky aroma. Wood also contains small quantities of proteins, which contribute roasted flavors. Many of the odor compounds in wood smoke, especially the phenolic compounds, are unstable, dissipating after a few weeks or months.

A number of wood smoke compounds act as preservatives. Phenol and other phenolic compounds in wood smoke are both antioxidants, which slow rancidification of animal fats, and antimicrobials, which slow bacterial growth. Other antimicrobials in wood smoke include formaldehyde, acetic acid, and other organic acids, which give wood smoke a low pH—about 2.5. Some of these compounds are toxic to people as well, and may have health effects in the quantities found in cooking applications.

Since different species of trees have different ratios of components, various types of wood do impart a different flavor to food. Another important factor is the temperature at which the wood burns. High-temperature fires see the flavor molecules broken down further into unpleasant or flavorless compounds. The optimal conditions for smoke flavor are low, smoldering temperatures between 300 and 400 °C (570 and 750 °F). This is the temperature of the burning wood itself, not of the smoking environment, which uses much lower temperatures. Woods that are high in lignin content tend to burn hot; to keep them smoldering requires restricted oxygen supplies or a high moisture content. When smoking using wood chips or chunks, the combustion temperature is often raised by soaking the pieces in water before placing them on a fire.

== Types of smokers ==
=== Offset ===
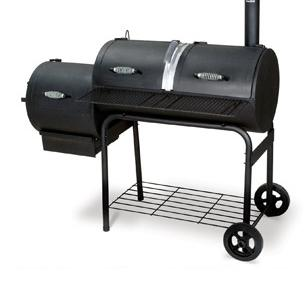
An example of a common offset smoker

The main characteristics of the offset smoker are that the cooking chamber is usually cylindrical in shape, with a shorter, smaller diameter cylinder attached to the bottom of one end for a firebox. To cook the meat, a small fire is lit in the firebox, where airflow is tightly controlled. The heat and smoke from the fire are drawn through a connecting pipe or opening into the cooking chamber.

The heat and smoke cook and flavor the meat before escaping through an exhaust vent at the opposite end of the cooking chamber. Most manufacturers' models are based on this simple but effective design, and this is what most people picture when they think of a "BBQ smoker". Even large capacity commercial units use this same basic design of a separate, smaller fire box and a larger cooking chamber.

==== Reverse flow offset ====
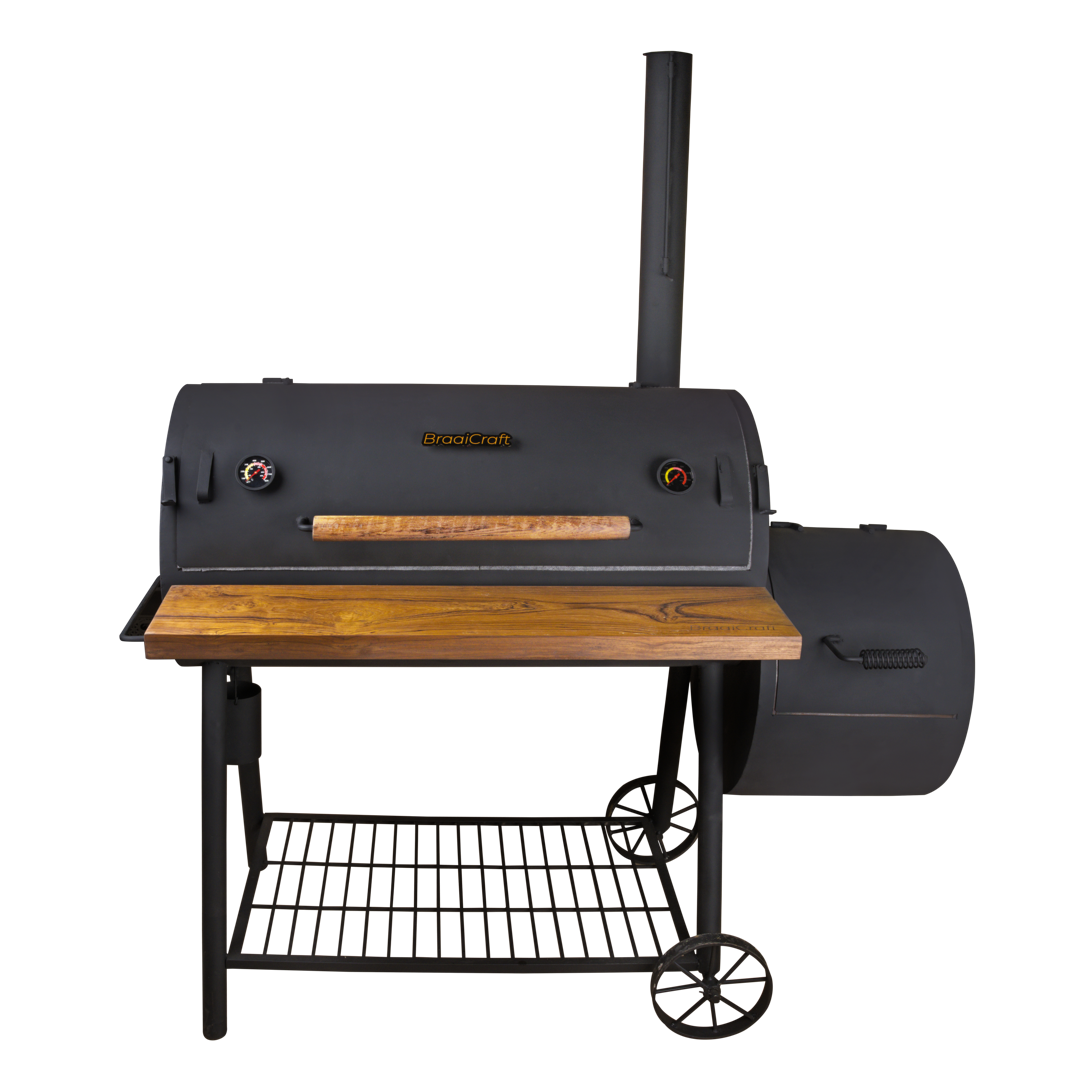
An example of a common reverse flow offset smoker

A reverse flow offset smoker is a variation of the traditional offset design. In this configuration, a solid baffle plate or duct forces the heat and smoke to travel beneath the food before rising and reversing direction to exit through a chimney positioned on the same side as the firebox. This setup promotes more consistent temperatures across the cooking chamber and enhances smoke distribution, which can result in more even cooking. Reverse flow smokers are popular among pitmasters seeking stable heat and reduced hot spots.

=== Upright drum ===
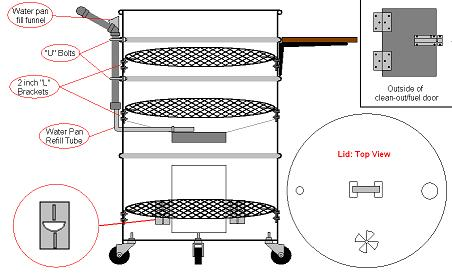
A diagram of a typical upright drum smoker

The upright drum smoker (also referred to as an ugly drum smoker or UDS) is exactly what its name suggests: an upright steel drum that has been modified for the purpose of pseudo-indirect hot smoking. There are many ways to accomplish this, but the basics include the use of a complete steel drum, a basket to hold charcoal near the bottom, and a cooking rack (or racks) near the top, all covered by a vented lid of some sort. These smokers have been built using many different sizes of steel drums, such as 30 US gallons (110 L; 25 imp gal), 55 US gallons (210 L; 46 imp gal), and 85 US gallons (320 L; 71 imp gal), but the most popular size is the common 55-gallon drum.

This design is similar to smoking with indirect heat due to the distance between the coals and the cooking racks, which is typically 24 inches (61 cm). The temperature is controlled by limiting the air intake at the bottom of the drum, and allowing a similar amount of exhaust out of vents in the lid. UDSs use their fuel very efficiently, and are flexible in their ability to produce proper smoking conditions with or without the use of a water pan or drip pan.

=== Vertical water ===
A typical vertical water smoker

A vertical water smoker (also referred to as a bullet smoker because of its shape) is a variation of the upright drum smoker. It uses charcoal or wood to generate smoke and heat, and contains a water bowl between the fire and the cooking grates. The water bowl serves to maintain optimal smoking temperatures and also adds humidity to the smoke chamber. It also creates an effect in which the water vapor and smoke condense together, which adds flavor to smoked foods. In addition, the bowl catches any drippings from the meat that may cause a flare-up. Vertical water smokers are extremely temperature stable and require very little adjustment once the desired temperature has been reached. Because of their relatively low cost and stable temperature, they are sometimes used in barbecue competitions where propane and electric smokers are not allowed.

=== Propane ===
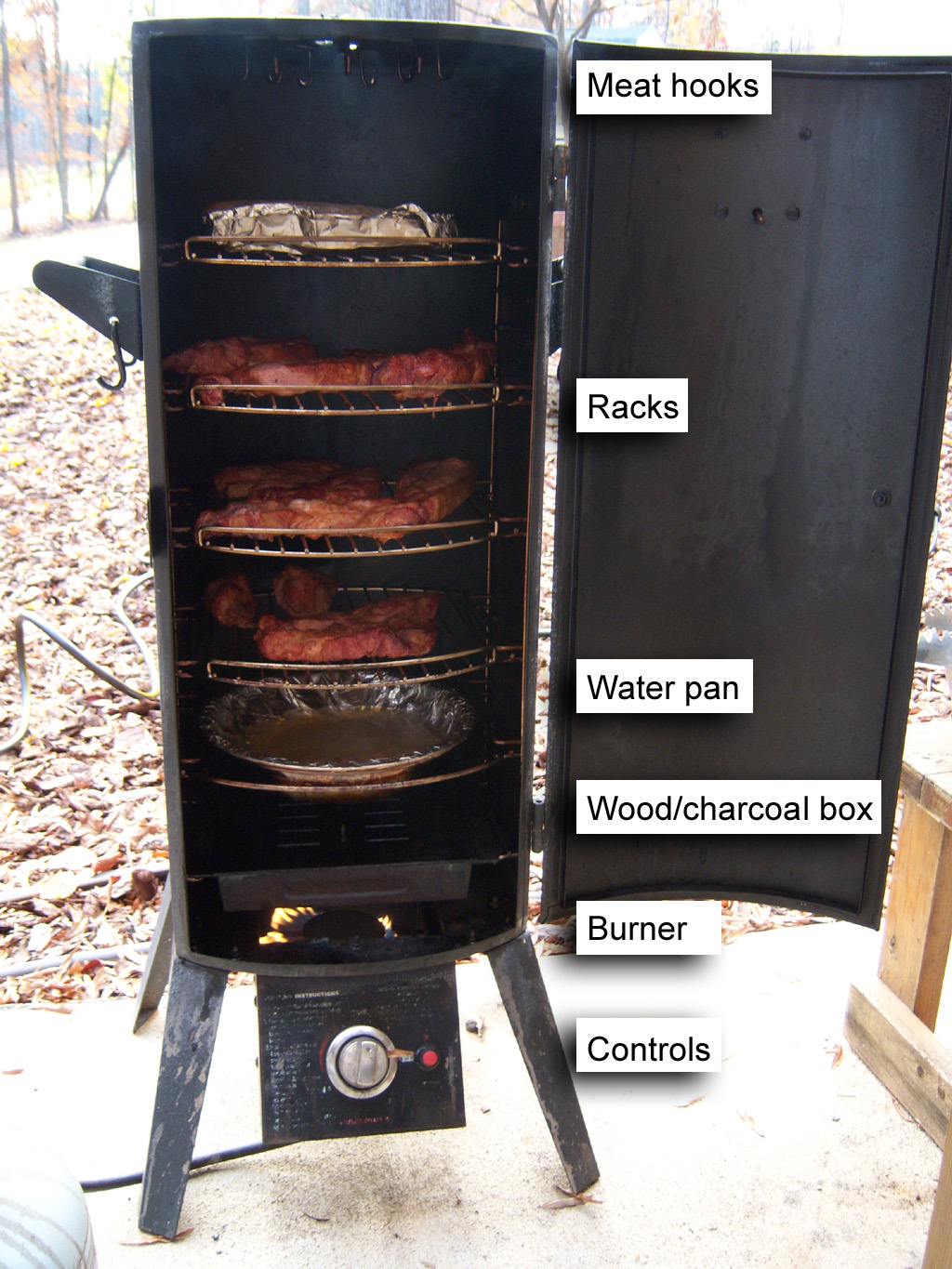
A diagram of a propane smoker, loaded with country style ribs and pork loin in foil

A propane smoker is designed to allow the smoking of meat in a somewhat more temperature controlled environment. The primary differences are the sources of heat and of the smoke. In a propane smoker, the heat is generated by a gas burner directly under a steel or iron box containing the wood or charcoal that provides the smoke. The steel box has few vent holes, on the top of the box only. By starving the heated wood of oxygen, it smokes instead of burning. Any combination of woods and charcoal may used. This method uses much less wood but does require propane fuel.

=== Smoke box ===
This more traditional method uses a two-box system: a fire box and a food box. The fire box is typically adjacent or under the cooking box, and can be controlled to a finer degree. The heat and smoke from the fire box exhausts into the food box, where it is used to cook and smoke the meat. These may be as simple as an electric heating element with a pan of wood chips placed on it, although more advanced models have finer temperature controls.

=== Electric smokers ===
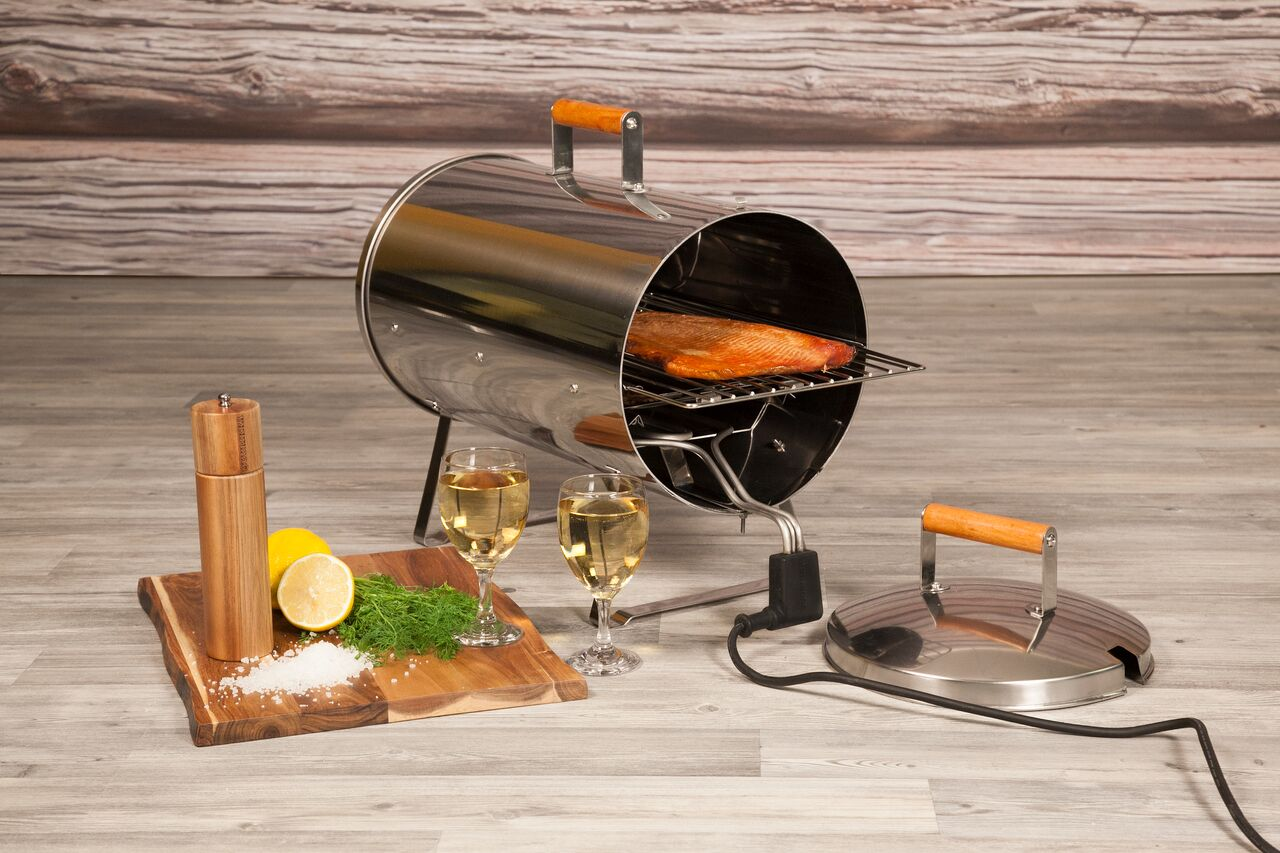
An electric smoker with a slab of hot-smoked salmon inside

The most convenient of the various types of smokers are the insulated electric smokers. These devices house a heating element that can maintain temperatures ranging from that required for a cold smoke all the way up to 135 °C (275 °F) with little to no intervention from the user. Although wood chunks, pellets, and even in some cases automatically fed wood pucks are used to generate smoke, the amount of flavor obtained is less than traditional wood or charcoal smokers.

=== Trench ===
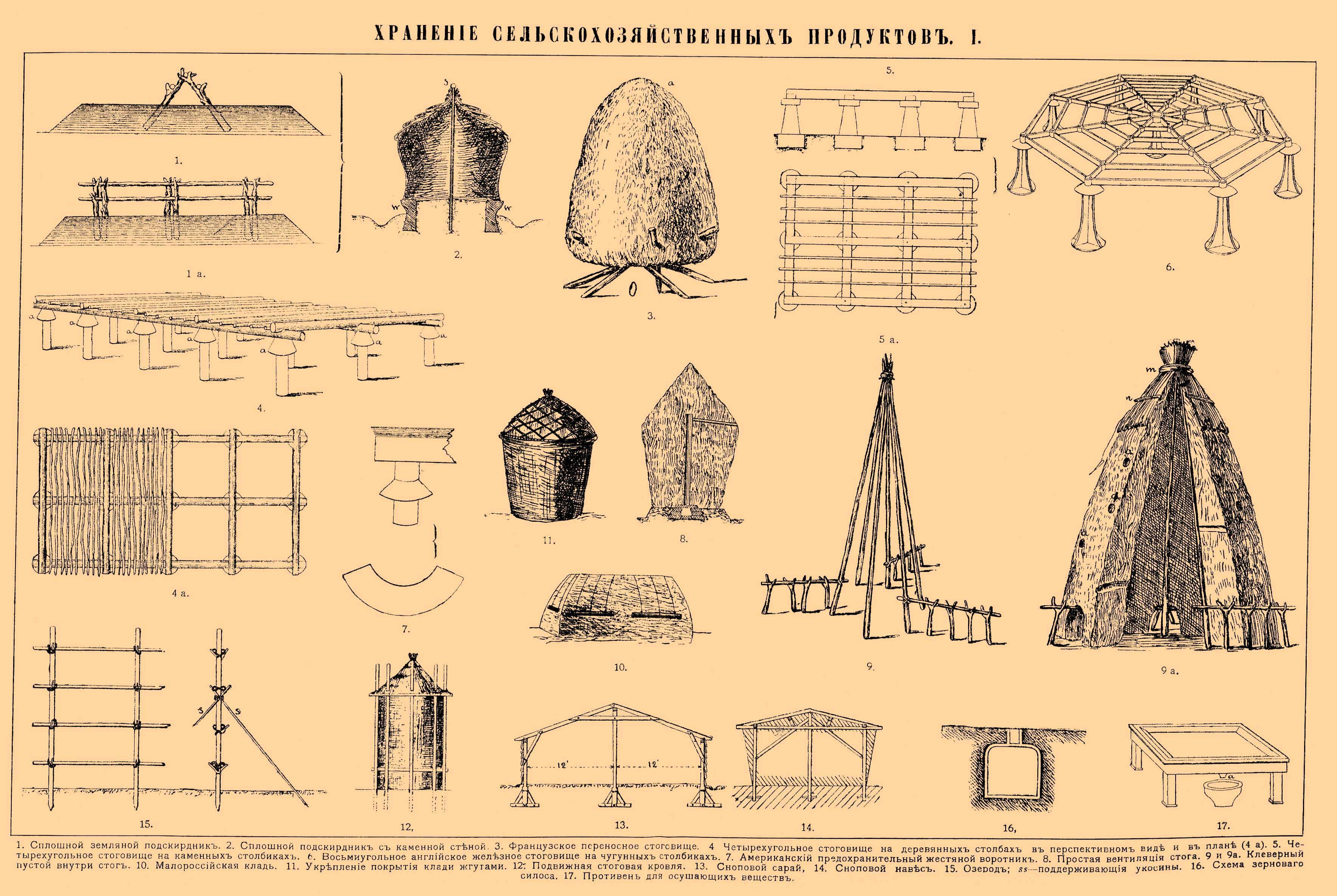
Various shapes of smoking racks

In this method the firebox is a narrow trench cut down a slope pointing into the prevailing wind. The middle part of the trench is covered over to make it into a tunnel. At the upper end of the trench is a vertical framework covered to form a chimney within which is placed the rack of foodstuff. At the lower upwind end of the trench is lit a small smokey fire, and sustained day and night until the foodstuff is cured.

=== Commercial smokehouse ===
Commercial smokehouses, mostly made from stainless steel, have independent systems for smoke generation and cooking. Smoke generators use friction, an electric coil or a small flame to ignite sawdust on demand. Heat from steam coils or gas flames is balanced with live steam or water sprays to control the temperature and humidity. Elaborate air handling systems reduce hot or cold spots, to reduce variation in the finished product. Racks on wheels or rails are used to hold the product and facilitate movement.

=== Pellet smokers ===
A pellet smoker is a temperature controlled smoker that burns wood pellets made of dried-out sawdust, about an inch long and 1/4 inch wide. The wood pellets are stored in a gravity-fed hopper that feeds into a motor-controlled auger by the temperature regulator. This auger pushes the pellets into the fire pot. An ignition rod within the auger ignites the pellets where a combustion fan keeps them smouldering. The motor and the combustion fan regulate the temperature of the smoker by feeding it more pellets and increasing airflow in the auger. Above the auger is a heat shield to disperse the direct heat before it reaches the heat box to allow the wood smoke to keep the heat box at an even temperature throughout. The heat sensor inside the heat box relays the current temperature inside the box back to the temperature regulator that controls the fan speed and pellet hopper motor, which either increase or decrease the amount of pellets in the auger or the amount of air available to the fire to maintain the desired temperature for the cook.

The popularity of this type of smoker is on the rise after many BBQ pit-masters began using them in barbecue competitions.

== Preservation ==
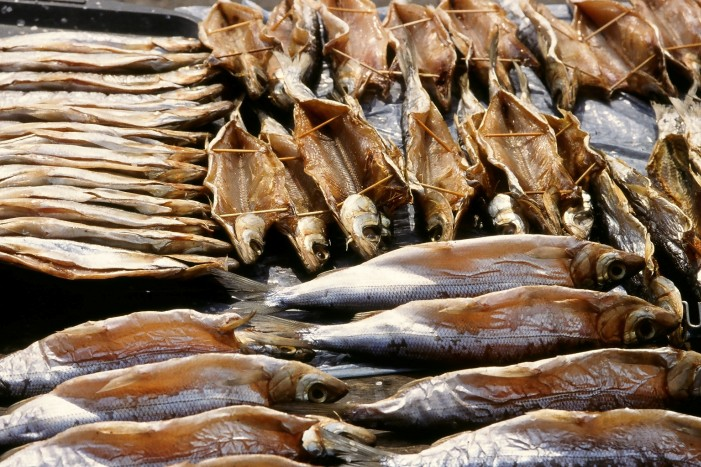
Smoked omul fish, endemic to Lake Baikal in Russia, on sale at Listyanka market

Smoke is both an antimicrobial and antioxidant, but it is insufficient for preserving food because it does not penetrate far into meat or fish; therefore, if the food is to be preserved, smoking is typically combined with salt-curing or drying.

Smoking is especially useful for oily fish, as its antioxidant properties inhibit surface fat rancidification and delay oxygen from reaching the interior fat and degrading it. Some heavily salted, long-smoked fish can keep without refrigeration for weeks or months.

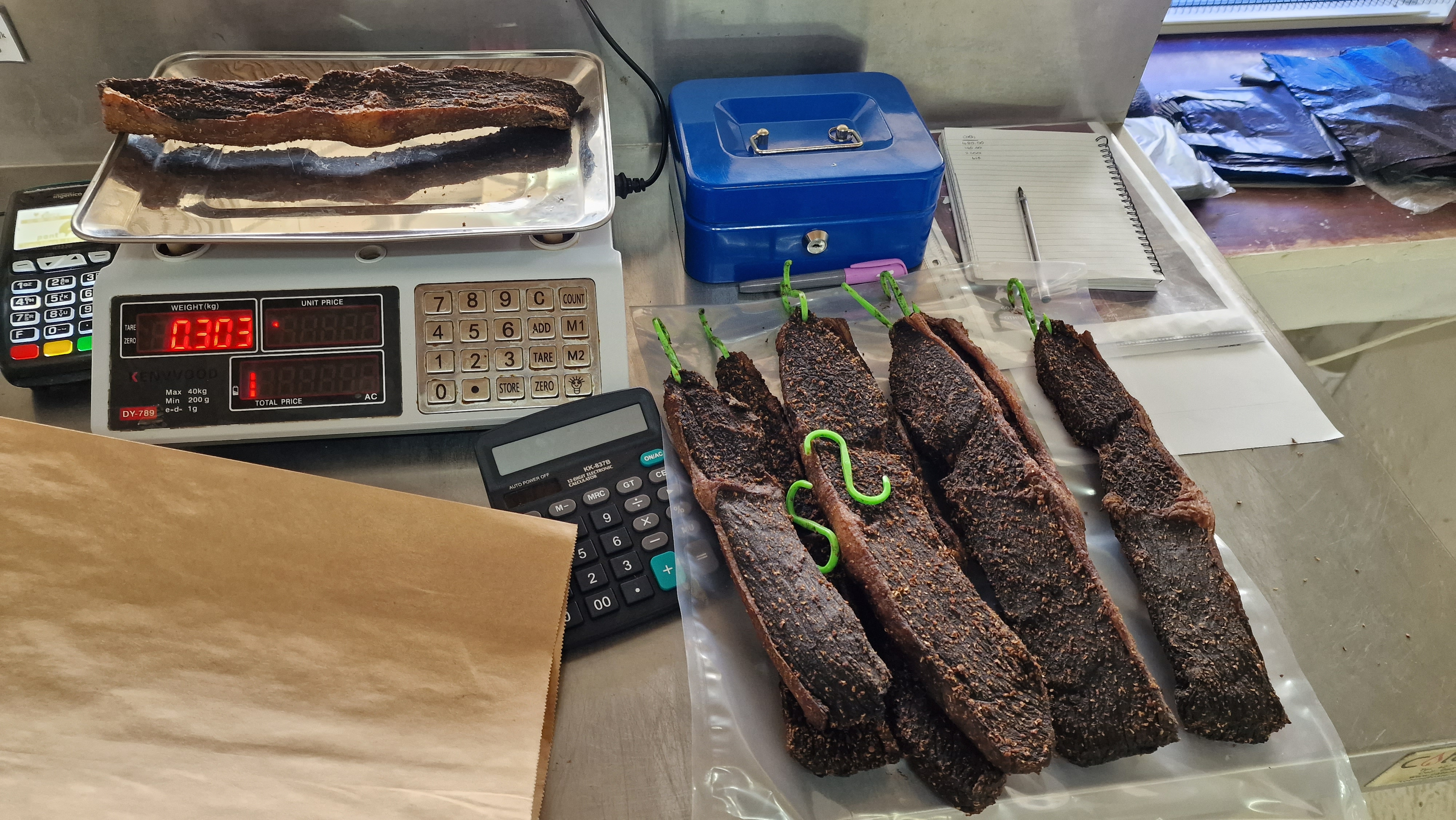
Smoked meat being weighed and prepared for sale

Artificial smoke flavoring (such as liquid smoke) can be purchased to mimic smoking's flavor, but such products have no preservative qualities.

== Competitive smoking ==
Competitive BBQ smoking is becoming increasingly popular, especially in the southern United States, where BBQ enthusiasts come together over a weekend to cook various cuts of meat such as a whole hog or a beef brisket.

Organisations such as Kansas City Barbeque Society run competitions all over America.

== Health concerns ==
Regularly consuming smoked meats and fish may increase the risk of several types of cancer.

== List of smoked foods and beverages ==
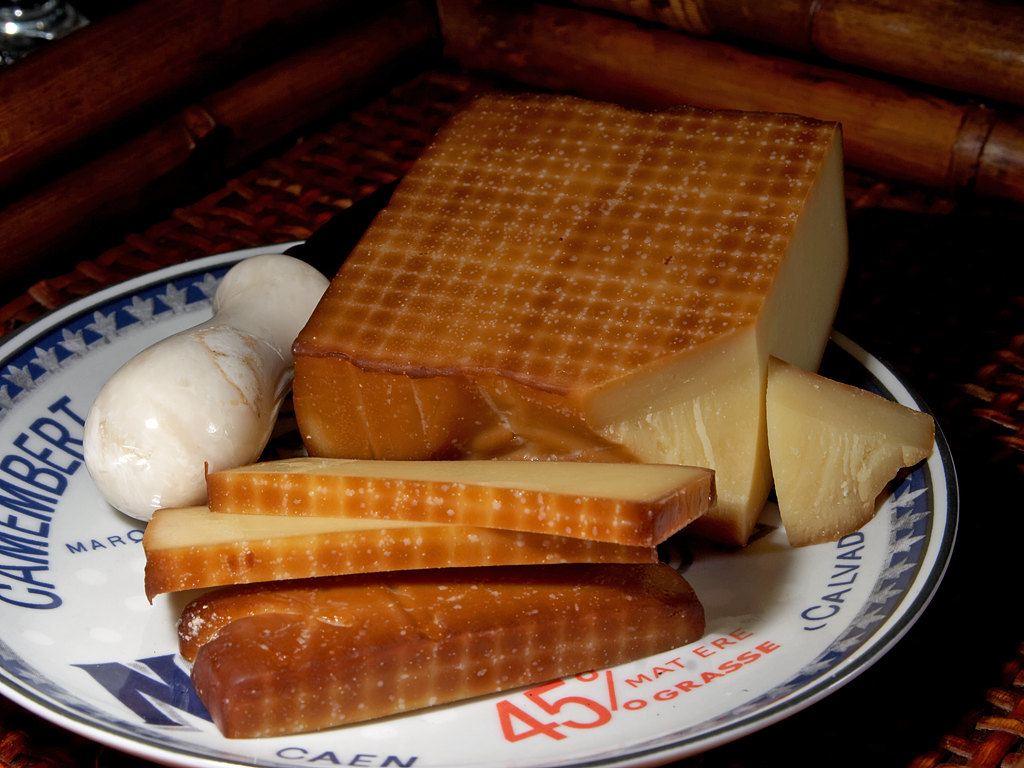
Smoked Gruyère cheese

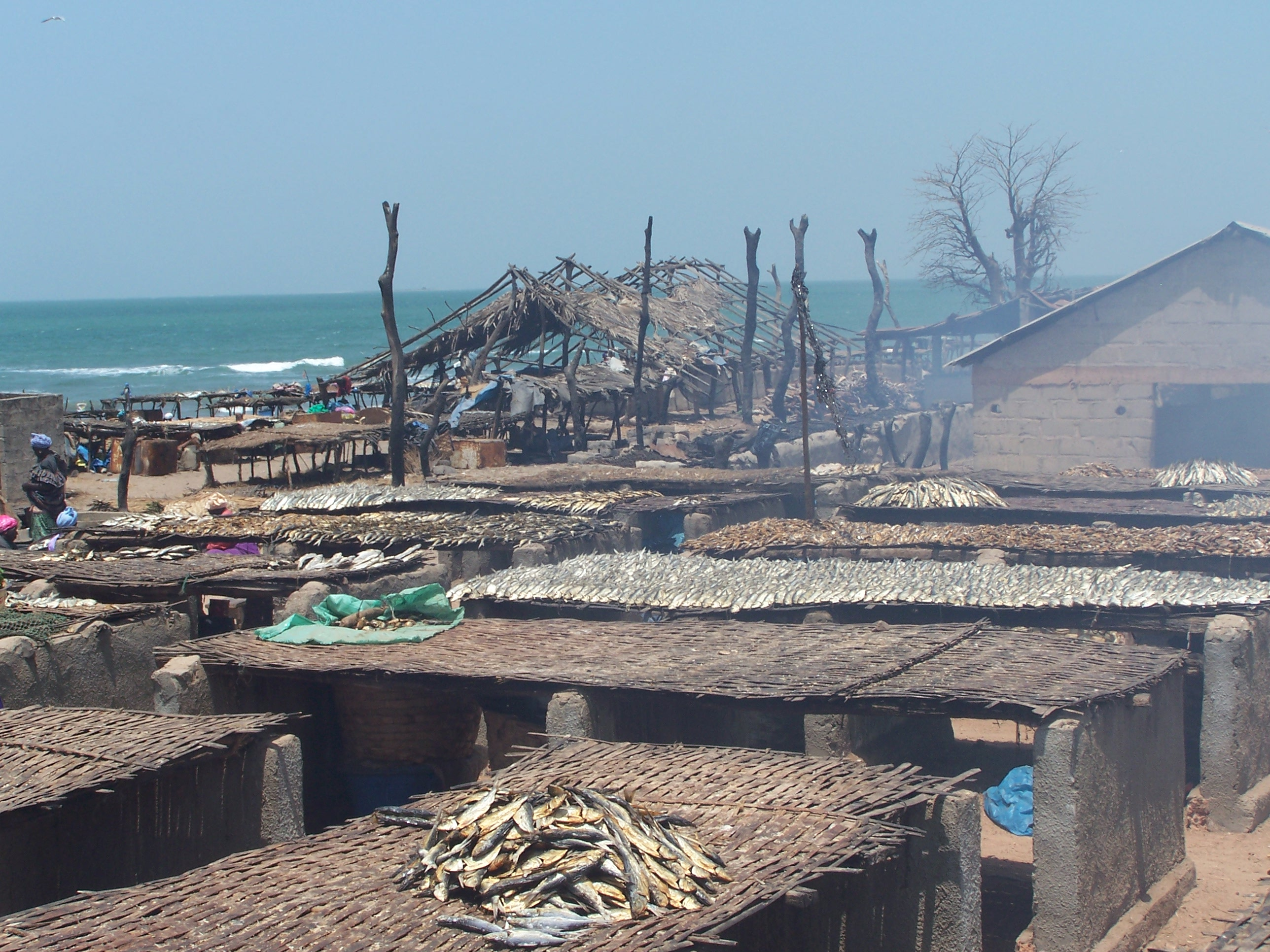
Fish being smoked in Tanji, the Gambia

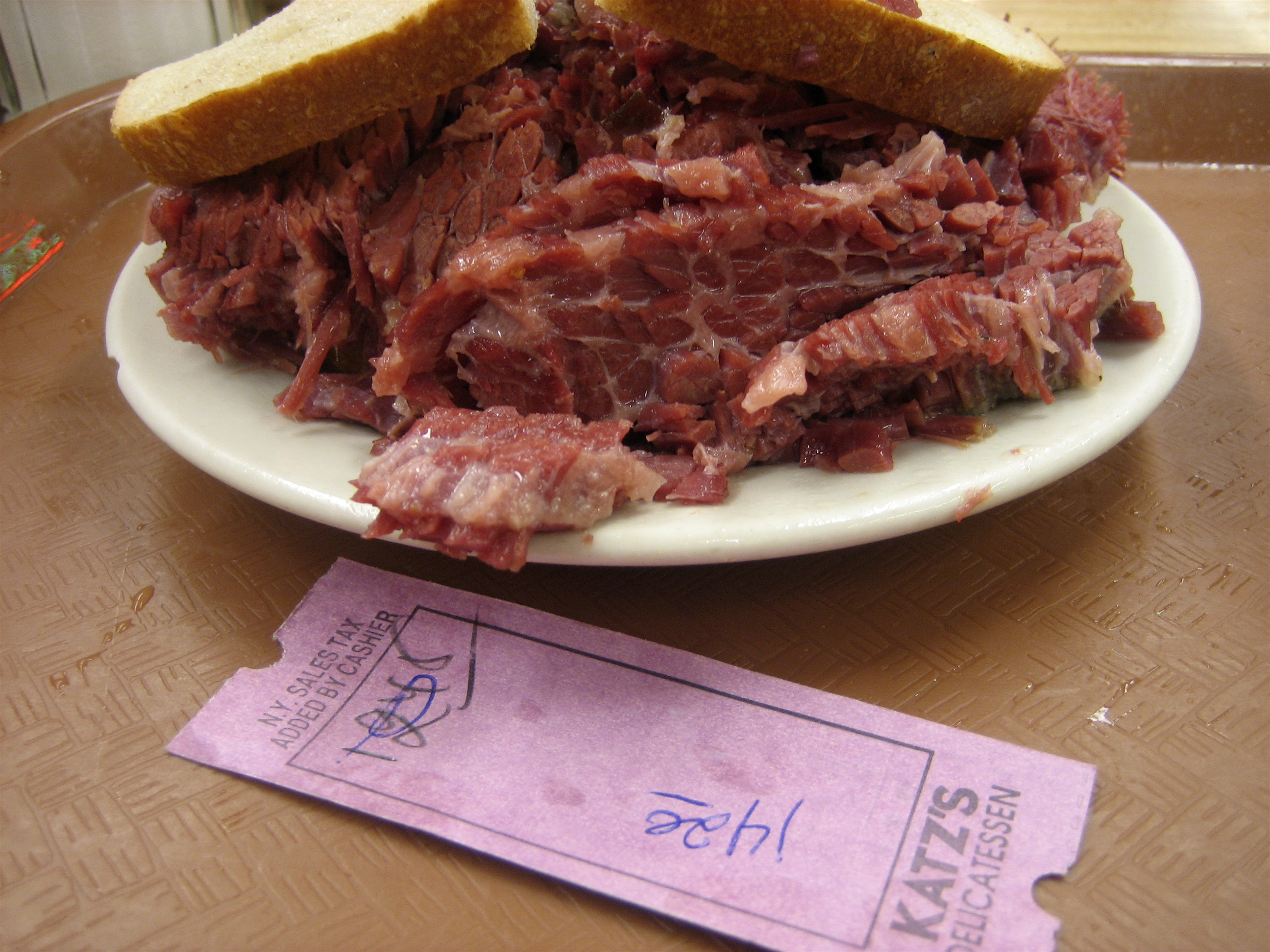
Pastrami, a smoked and cured beef product

Some of the more common smoked foods and beverages include:

Beverages

- Lapsang souchong tea leaves are smoked and dried over pine or cedar fires
- Malt beverages
  - The malt used to make whisky
  - Rauchbier (smoked beer)
  - Grodziskie (smoked beer)
- Maté, in the traditional preparation yerba mate leaves are smoked

Fruit and vegetables

- Capsicums: chipotles (smoked, ripe jalapeños), paprika
- Prunes (dried plums) can be smoked while drying
- Wumei are smoked plum fruits
- Iburi-gakko are a smoked daikon pickle from Akita Prefecture, Japan

Meat, fish, and cheese

- Beef
  - Pastrami (pickled, spiced and smoked beef brisket)
- Pork
  - Bacon
  - Ham
  - Bakkwa
- Turkey
- Chicken
- Sausage
  - Salami
- Jerky
- Fish
  - Eel popular in eastern/northern Europe
  - Traditional Grimsby smoked fish (cod and haddock)
  - Haddock and Arbroath smokies (haddock)
  - Buckling, kippers and bloater (herring)
  - Salmon
  - Mackerel
  - Bivalves including oysters and mussels.
- Egg (eggs and fish eggs)
- Cheese
  - Adyghe Qwaye (Circassian)
  - Gouda
  - Gruyère
  - Oscypek

Other proteins

- Nuts
- Tofu

Spices

- Paprika
- Salt

== See also ==
- Braising
- Canning
- Drying
- Jerky
- List of dried foods
- List of sausage dishes
- List of sausages
- List of smoked foods
- Smoked fish
- Smoked meat
