= Baked potato =

Potato dish

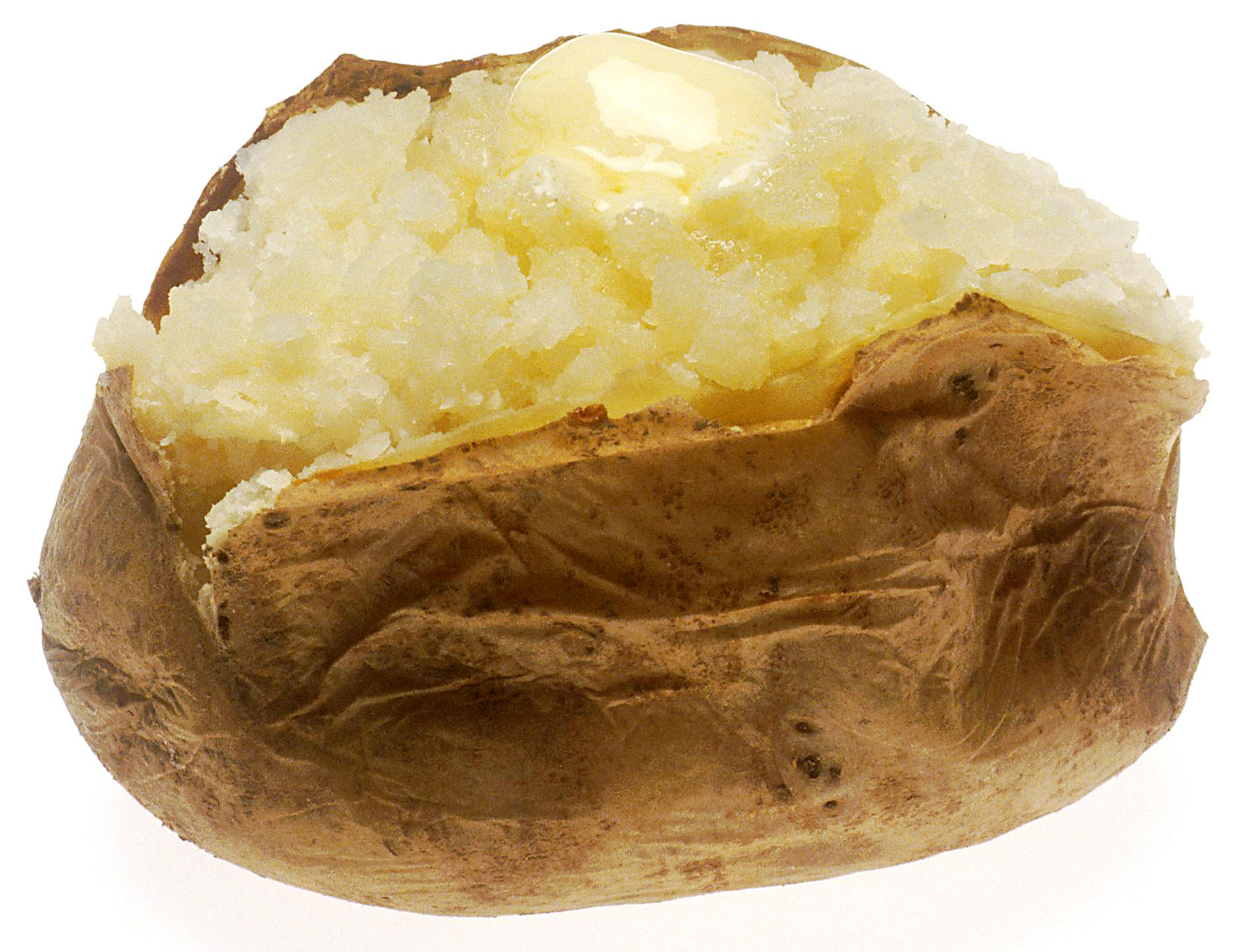
- Baked potato with butter
- Alternative names: Jacket potato
- Course: Side dish or main
- Main ingredients: Potato
- Ingredients generally used: Butter, cheese, sour cream, chives, dill, bacon bits, gravy, baked beans, tuna, and/or meat

A baked potato, also known in the United Kingdom as a jacket potato, is a preparation of potato. After baking, it may be served with fillings, toppings or condiments, such as butter, cheese and bacon bits, sour cream and chives, chicken curry, baked beans and tuna.

Some varieties of potato, such as Russet Burbank and King Edward, are more suitable for baking, owing to their size and consistency. Despite the popular misconception that potatoes are fattening, baked potatoes can be part of a healthy diet.

== Origin ==
Potatoes originated in South America, and were long cultivated in the Inca Empire, who baked them in a huatia, an underground cooking pit.

== Preparation ==
Potatoes can be baked in a gas or electric oven, on a barbecue grill, or on (or in) an open fire. They can also be cooked in a microwave oven, although the skin will not be crisp as with other methods of preparation unless finished in a conventional hot oven. Some restaurants use special ovens designed specifically to cook large numbers of potatoes, then keep them warm and ready for service.

The potato is first scrubbed clean, and usually washed and dried, with eyes and surface blemishes removed. It may be rubbed with oil, butter, salt, or a combination of these. Pricking the potato skin allows steam to escape during cooking, preventing accidental sometimes explosive rupturing of the potato skin due to accumulated steam pressure. Potatoes cooked in a microwave oven without pricking the skin are especially susceptible due to rapid fluctuations in heat.

A large potato takes between one and two hours to bake in a conventional oven at 200 °C (392 °F). A microwave oven takes from six to twelve minutes, depending on oven power and potato size, but does not produce a crisp skin. Some recipes use a microwave oven followed by a conventional oven to crisp the skin. A combination microwave and thermal oven can be used.

Wrapping the potato in aluminium foil before cooking in a standard oven will retain moisture, while leaving it unwrapped will result in a crisp skin. Cooking over an open fire or in the coals of a barbecue may require wrapping in foil to prevent burning of the skin. A potato buried directly in coals of a fire cooks well, albeit with a mostly burned and inedible skin. A baked potato is fully cooked when its internal temperature reaches 99 °C (210 °F).

Some people discard the skin of a baked potato, while others also eat the skin, which has a characteristic taste and texture and is rich in dietary fiber. Potatoes baked in their skins may lose between 20 and 40% of their vitamin C content, because heating in air is slow and vitamin inactivation can continue for a long time. Small potatoes, which bake more quickly, retain more of their vitamin C.

== Variations ==
Some people bake their potatoes and then scoop out the interior, leaving the skin as a shell. The white interior flesh can then be mixed with ingredients such as cheese, butter, or bacon bits, then spooned back into the skin shells and returned to the oven to warm and possibly brown. These are known variously as loaded potato skins, filled potatoes and twice-baked potatoes.

In Great Britain, toppings or fillings include baked beans, curried chicken, coronation chicken, chili con carne, shredded cheese, tuna mayonnaise, and coleslaw. In Scotland, haggis is sometimes used.

A variation is Hasselback potatoes, in which the potato is cut into thin slices almost down to the bottom, so that the potato still holds its shape, and is then baked in the oven, occasionally scalloped with cheese. The name "Hasselback" refers to the luxurious Hasselbacken hotel and restaurant in Stockholm, which originated this dish.

== Regional variations ==
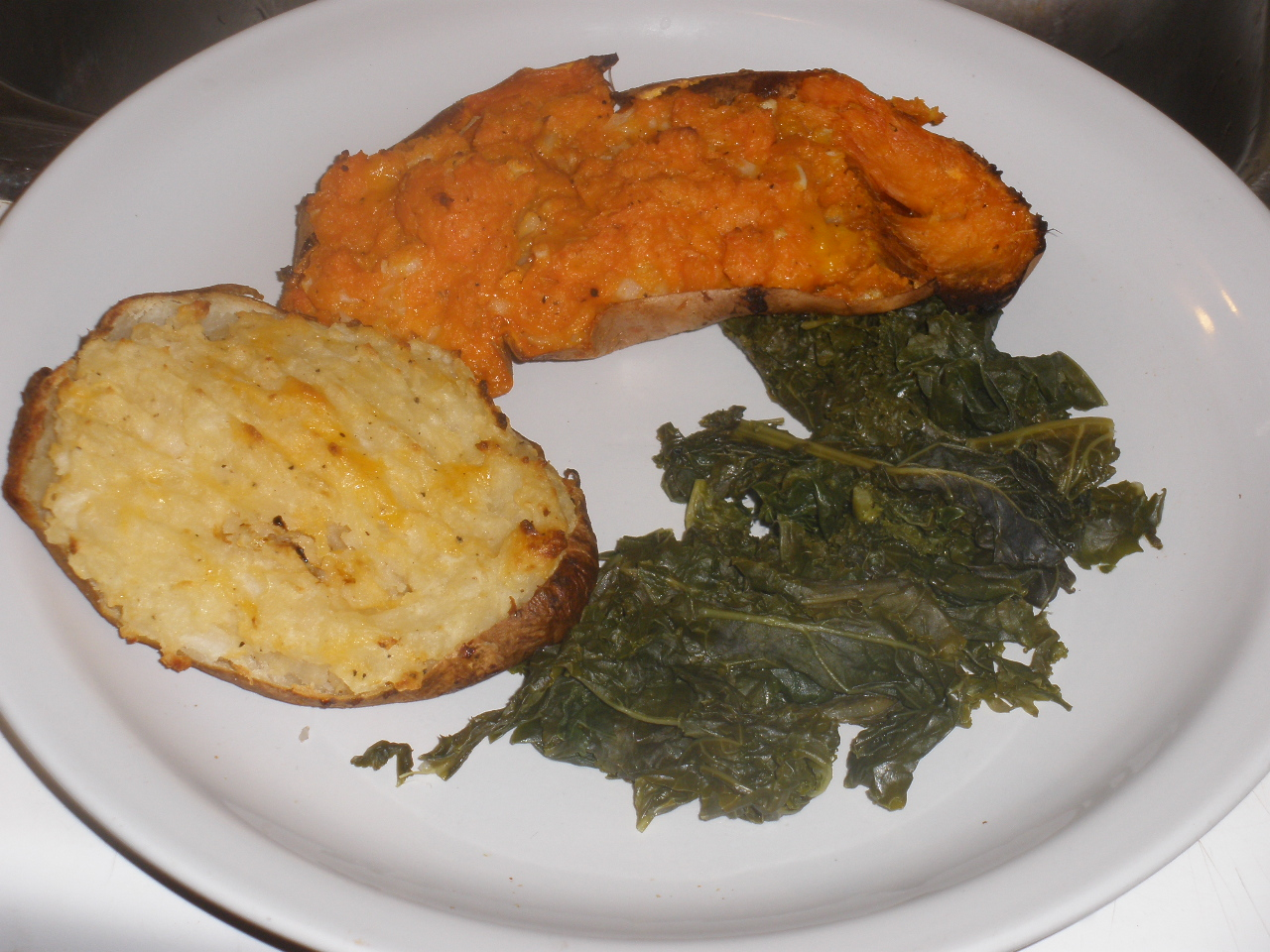
Baked potato and sweet potato with kale

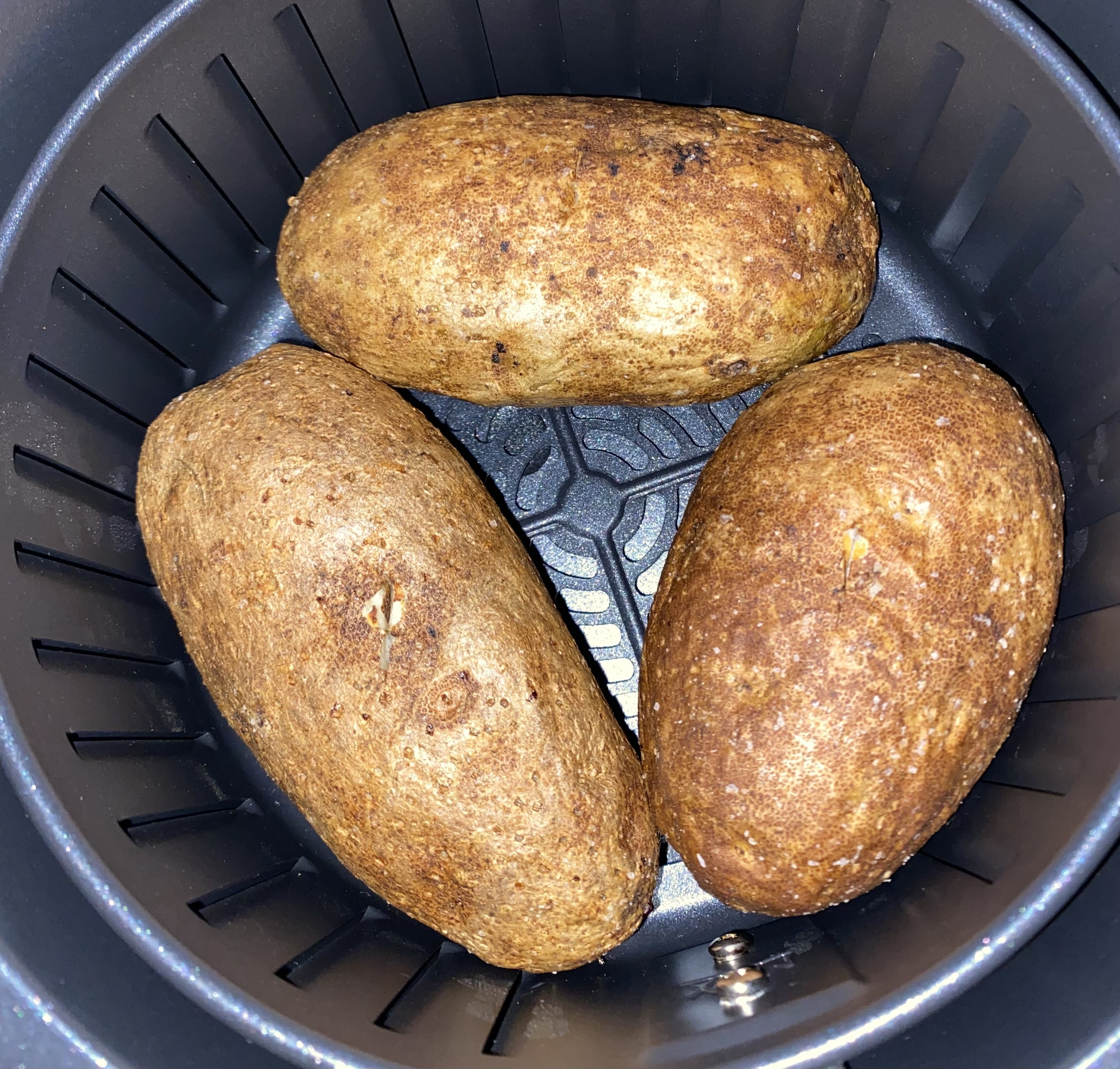
Potatoes baked in an air fryer

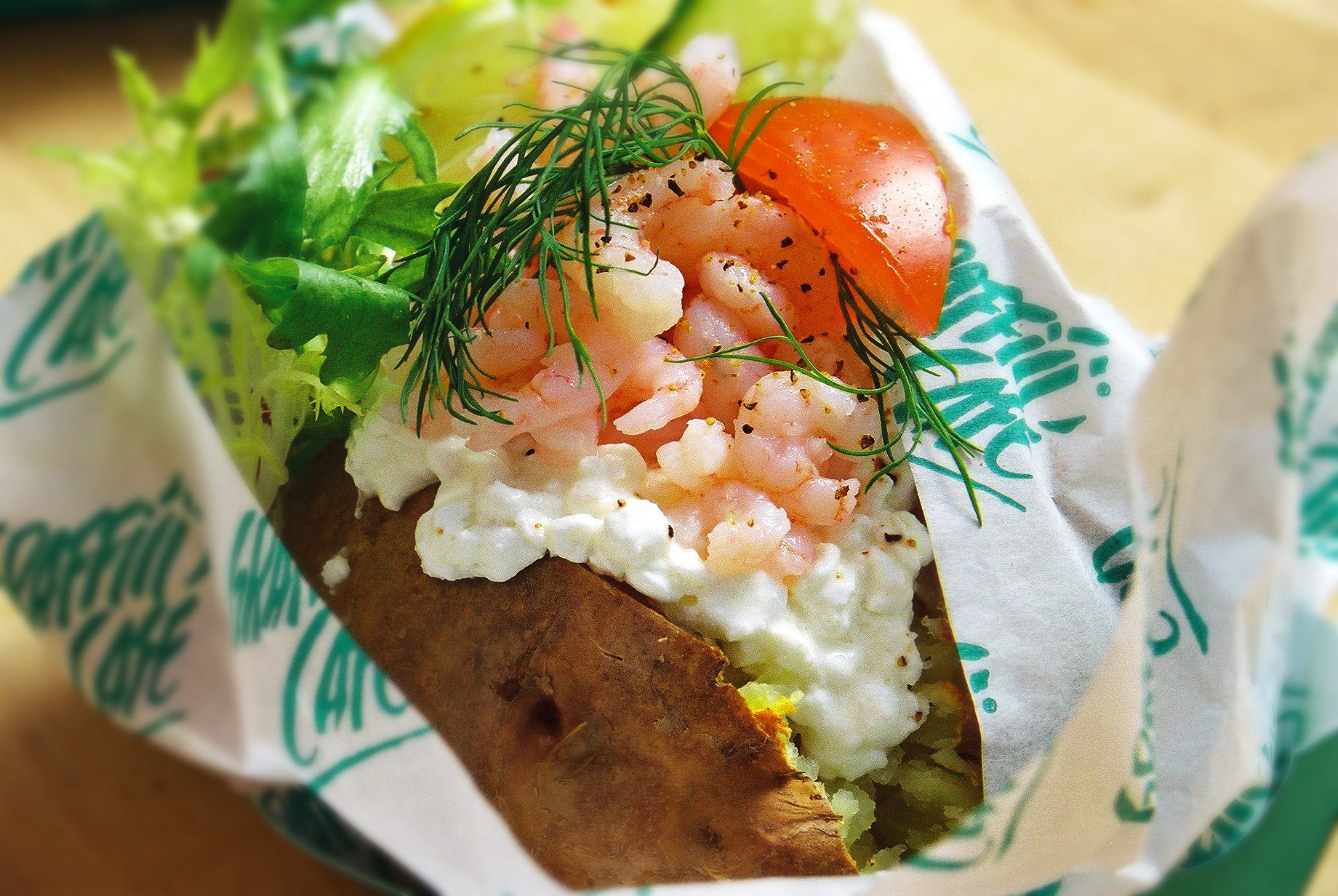
A baked potato with shrimp, cottage cheese, dill, tomato and lettuce from a Swedish café

=== North America ===
Many restaurants serve baked potatoes with sides such as butter, sour cream, chives, shredded cheese, and bacon bits. Sides are usually optional and customers can order as many or as few as they wish. Baked potatoes that are served with a number of these sides are commonly referred to as loaded potatoes or loaded baked potatoes. These potatoes can themselves be a side item to a steak dinner, or a similar entrée.

Large and stuffed baked potatoes may be served as an entrée, usually filled with meat in addition to any of the ingredients mentioned above. Barbecued or smoked meat or chili is substituted.

==== Idaho ====
Of US states, Idaho is the major producer of potatoes. The Idaho baked potato was heavily promoted by the Northern Pacific Railroad in the early 20th century, often using Hollywood movie stars.

Hazen Titus was appointed as the Northern Pacific Railway's dining car superintendent in 1908. He talked to Yakima Valley farmers who complained that they were unable to sell their potato crops because their potatoes were simply too large, so they fed them to hogs instead. Titus learned that a single potato could weigh from two to five pounds, with smaller potatoes preferred by the end buyers of the vegetable and that many considered them not to be edible because their thick, rough skin made them difficult to cook.

Titus and his staff discovered the "inedible" potatoes were delicious after baking in a slow oven. He contracted to purchase as many potatoes as the farmers could produce that were more than two pounds in weight. Soon after the first delivery of "Netted Gem Bakers", they were offered to diners on the North Coast Limited beginning in 1909. Word of the line's specialty offering traveled quickly, and before long it was using "the Great Big Baked Potato" as a slogan to promote the railroad's passenger service.

When an addition was built for the Northern Pacific's Seattle commissary in 1914, a reporter wrote, "A large trade mark, in the shape of a baked potato, 40 ft. long and 18 ft. in diameter, surmounts the roof. The potato is electric lighted and its eyes, through the electric mechanism, are made to wink constantly. A cube of butter thrust into its split top glows intermittently." Premiums such as postcards, letter openers, and spoons were produced to promote "The Route of the Great Big Baked Potato". The slogan served the Northern Pacific for about 50 years. The song "Great Big Baked Potato" (words by N.R. Streeter and H. Caldwell, music by Oliver George) was written about this potato.

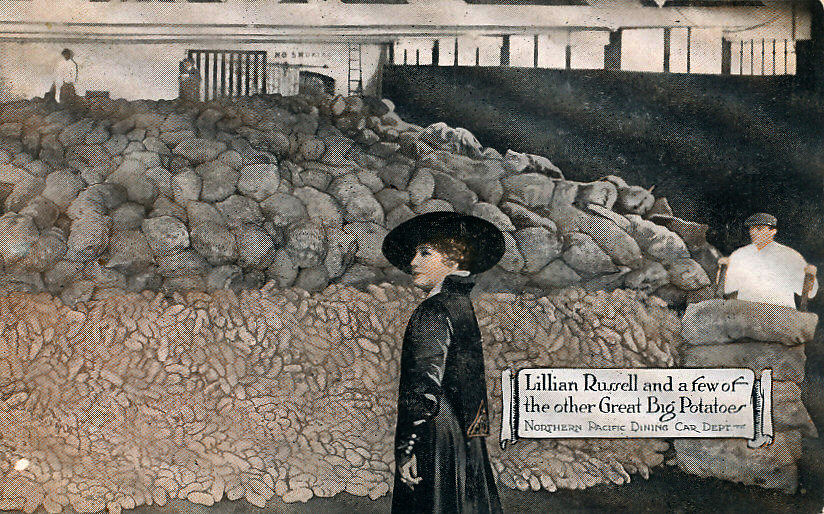
Hollywood star Lillian Russell shows off the Northern Pacific Railway's potatoes in this 1915 promotional postcard.

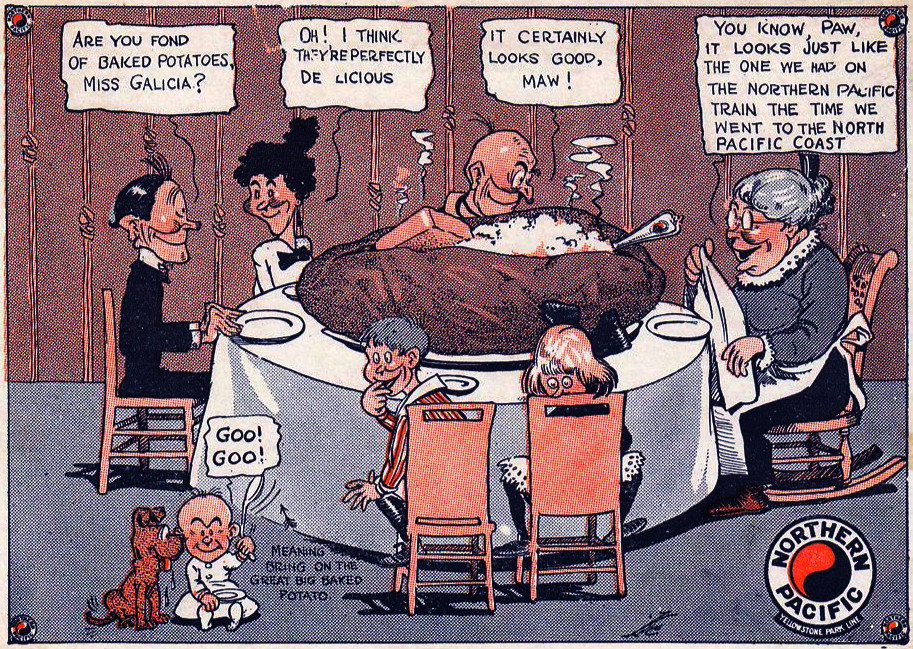
A comic postcard from circa 1910 to 1920 promoting "The Great Big Baked Potato"

=== United Kingdom ===
A baked potato, long a popular food in the United Kingdom, and is called a jacket potato. In the mid-19th century, jacket potatoes were sold on the streets during autumn and winter. In London, it was estimated in the mid-19th century that some 10 tons of baked potatoes were sold on the streets each day. Common jacket potato fillings (or "toppings") in the United Kingdom include grated cheddar cheese, baked beans, tuna mayonnaise, chili con carne, and chicken curry.

Baked potatoes are often eaten on Guy Fawkes Night, traditionally baked in the glowing embers of a bonfire.

=== France ===
A baked potato is called "pomme de terre au four" in French. As in other countries, it may be served as an accompaniment to a meat dish, or, in a fast-food restaurant (called a "pataterie" in France) be the centre of a meal.

=== Turkey ===
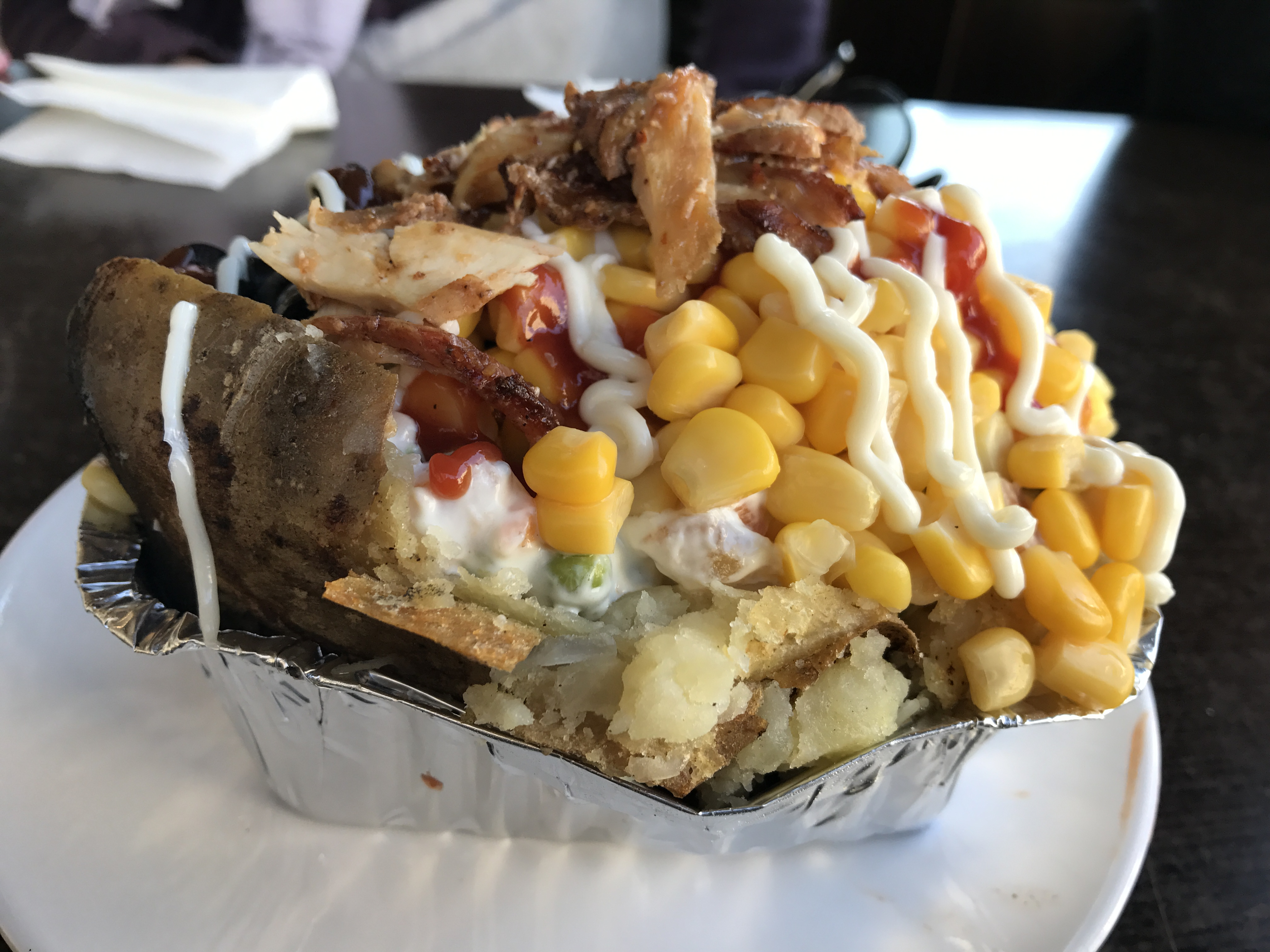
A Turkish kumpir with several toppings

Kumpir (from Bulgarian компир, "potato"), a baked potato with various fillings, is a popular fast food in Turkey. In its basic form, it is made with potatoes that are wrapped with foil and baked in special ovens. The potatoes are sliced down the middle and the insides are mixed with unsalted butter and puréed with kaşar cheese. A variety of foods can be added to the potato such as mayonnaise, ketchup, pickles, sweetcorn, sausage slices, carrots, mushrooms and Russian salad.
