= Vete-Katten =

Classic pastry and coffeeshop in Stockholm, Sweden

Vete Katten
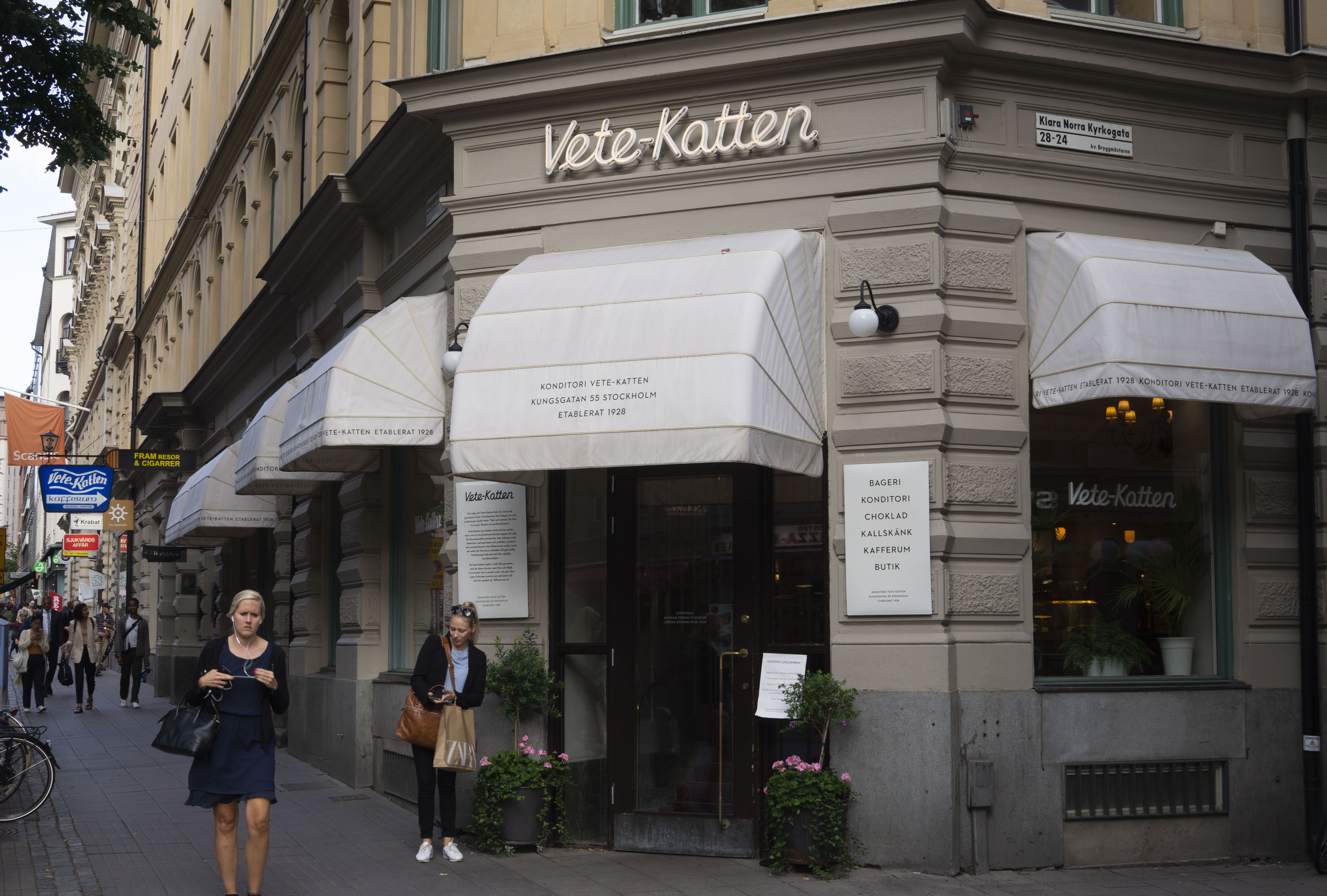
- Vete Katten in 2020.
- Native name: Vete-Katten
- Company type: pastelry, coffeeshop
- Website: http://vetekatten.se/

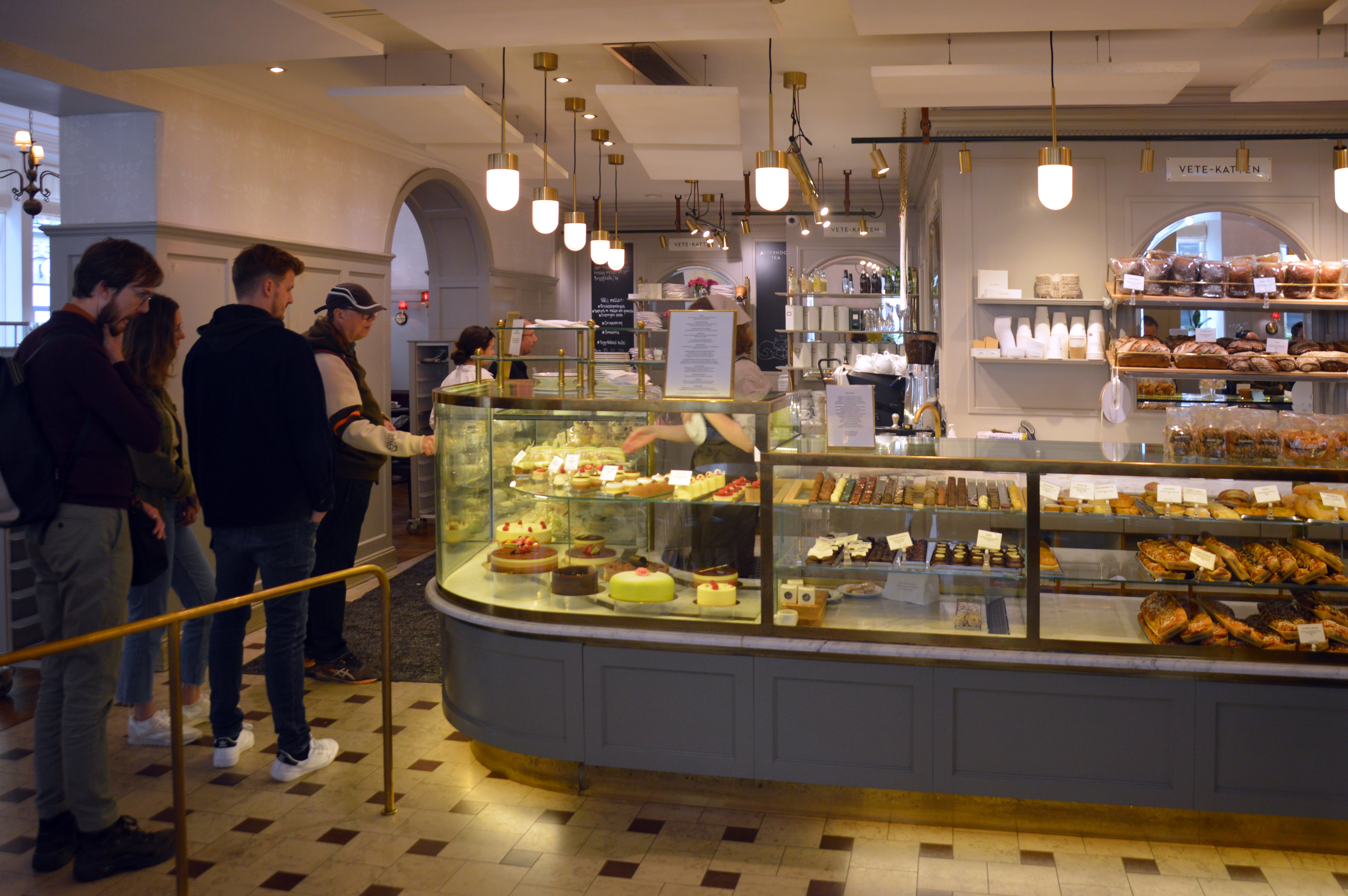
Interior

Vete-Katten (meaning “The wheat cat” in Swedish) is a classic Sweden pastry- and coffeeshop.

== History ==
Vete-Katten is a patisserie on the corner of Kungsgatan 55 in Stockholm. It also has a number of smaller units at S:t Eriksgatan 41, in Åhlens City, Stockholm Central Station, Karolinska Hospital, Hotel Continental and the Gallerian in Stockholm. Vete-Katten was founded in 1928 by Ester Nordhammar as a pastry shop and bakery as well as chocolate manufacturing. The name was created according to the rumor when the first owner gave the answer "vete katten" (a double entendre in Swedish) when asked what the establishment should be called. Vete-Katten has always been smoke-free.

In 1979, Agneta and Östen Brolin took over the company and ran it until September 2012, when the company was sold to, among others, master pastry chef Johan Sandelin, who had worked in the company since 1997. This coffeeshop is well known as a Scandinavian and Sweden cake shop where the people can get typical cakes and sweets.

Vete Katten was awarded by the Gourmet Merit (pour la Merite Gastronomique).

Between 2020 and 2021 the coffeeshop published a recipe book containing its main jams, loaves of bread, and the princess cake with a green layer.

During a long period of time the workers of the coffeeshop were only women both in the front as back of the counter, unusual in those years.
