= Schubert's Bakery =

Bakery in San Francisco, California, United States

Schubert's Bakery is a bakery in San Francisco, California, United States. It's located in the Richmond District neighborhood. The business was established by in 1911 and has been designated as a legacy business. It's well known in San Francisco. Its main focus is desserts.

== History ==
Oswald R. Schubert, a German immigrant, founded Schubert's Bakery in 1911 on Fillmore Street near McAllister Street. When Schubert retired, he sold the business to a baker named Fred Kreye.

As the bakery's popularity grew, Kreye needed a larger space to meet the increasing demand. In 1948, he moved the bakery to its current location on Clement Street. He owned and operated Schubert's until June 1, 1969, when he sold it to Hilmar and Annie Maier.

The Maiers ran the bakery until they decided to sell it to Ralph and Lutz Wenzel, who were employees and recent German immigrants. The Wenzel brothers couldn't secure a bank loan so the Maiers offered a loan for the sale. They took ownership in 1995.

Lutz Wenzel retired in 2012, leaving Ralph Wenzel and his wife, Valerie, to run the business.

In 2019, the business was designated as a legacy business by San Francisco's Office of Small Business.

== Products ==
Schubert's Bakery specializes in European-style desserts, pastries, and layered cakes. Among its best-known products are the Swedish Princess cake, Strawberry Shortcake, Opera cake, and Neapolitan cake.

Some of Schubert's cakes date to the business's earlier years, while others were introduced by later owners. Original favorites included the Neapolitan and Opera cake, and later additions included items such as tiramisu and the Swedish Princess cake.

== Gallery ==
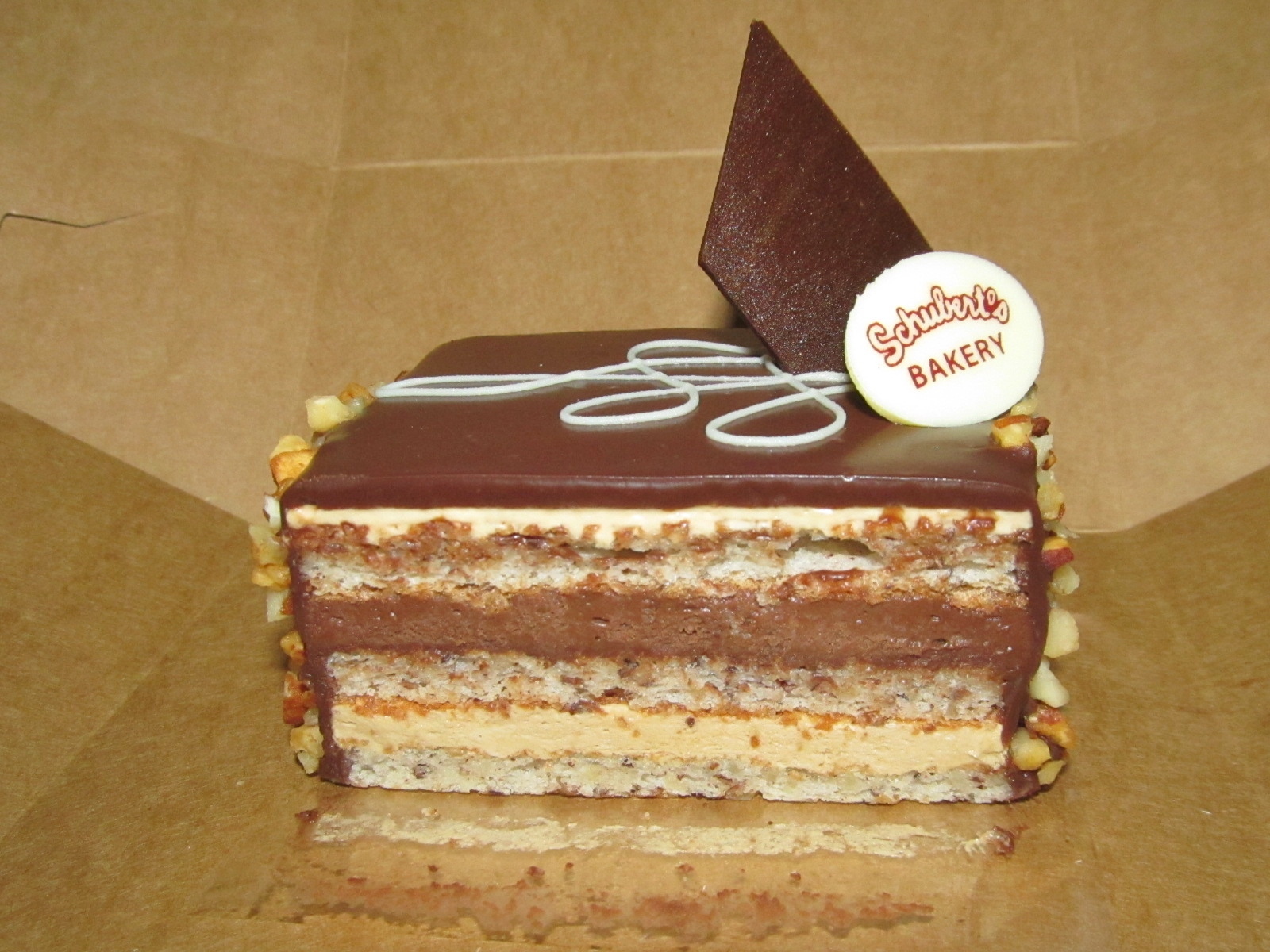
Opera cake

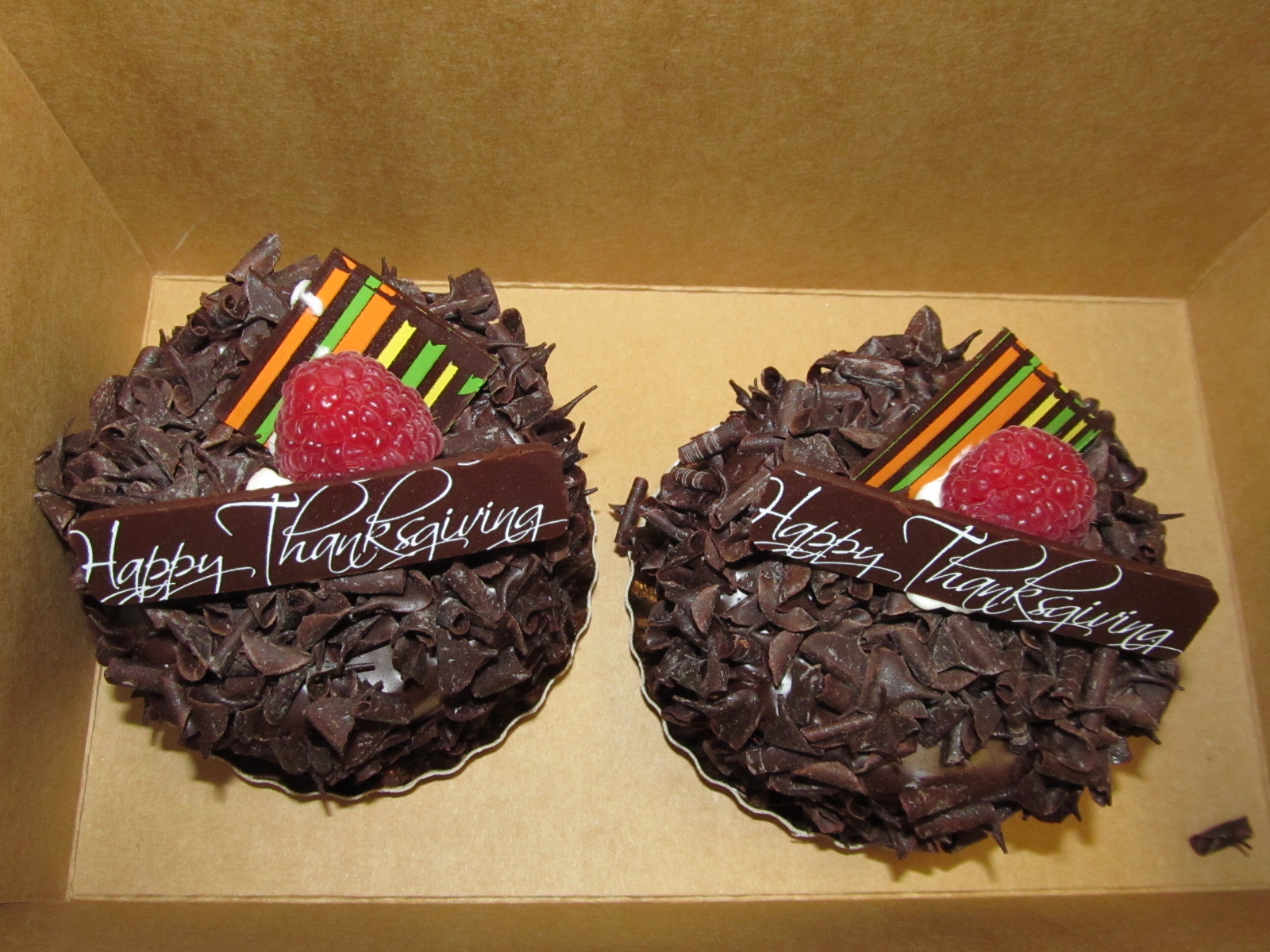
Chocolate cakes

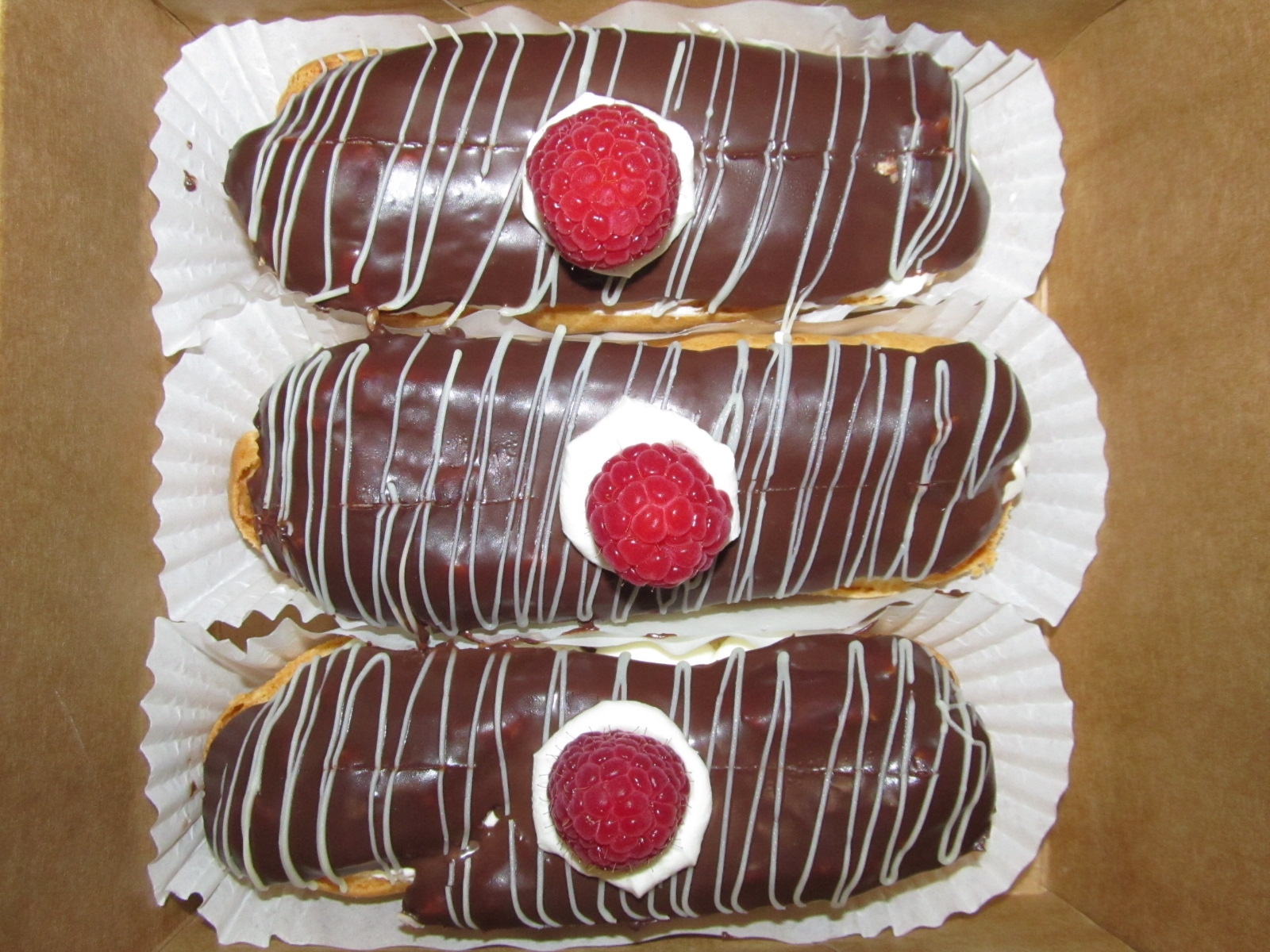
Chocolate éclairs

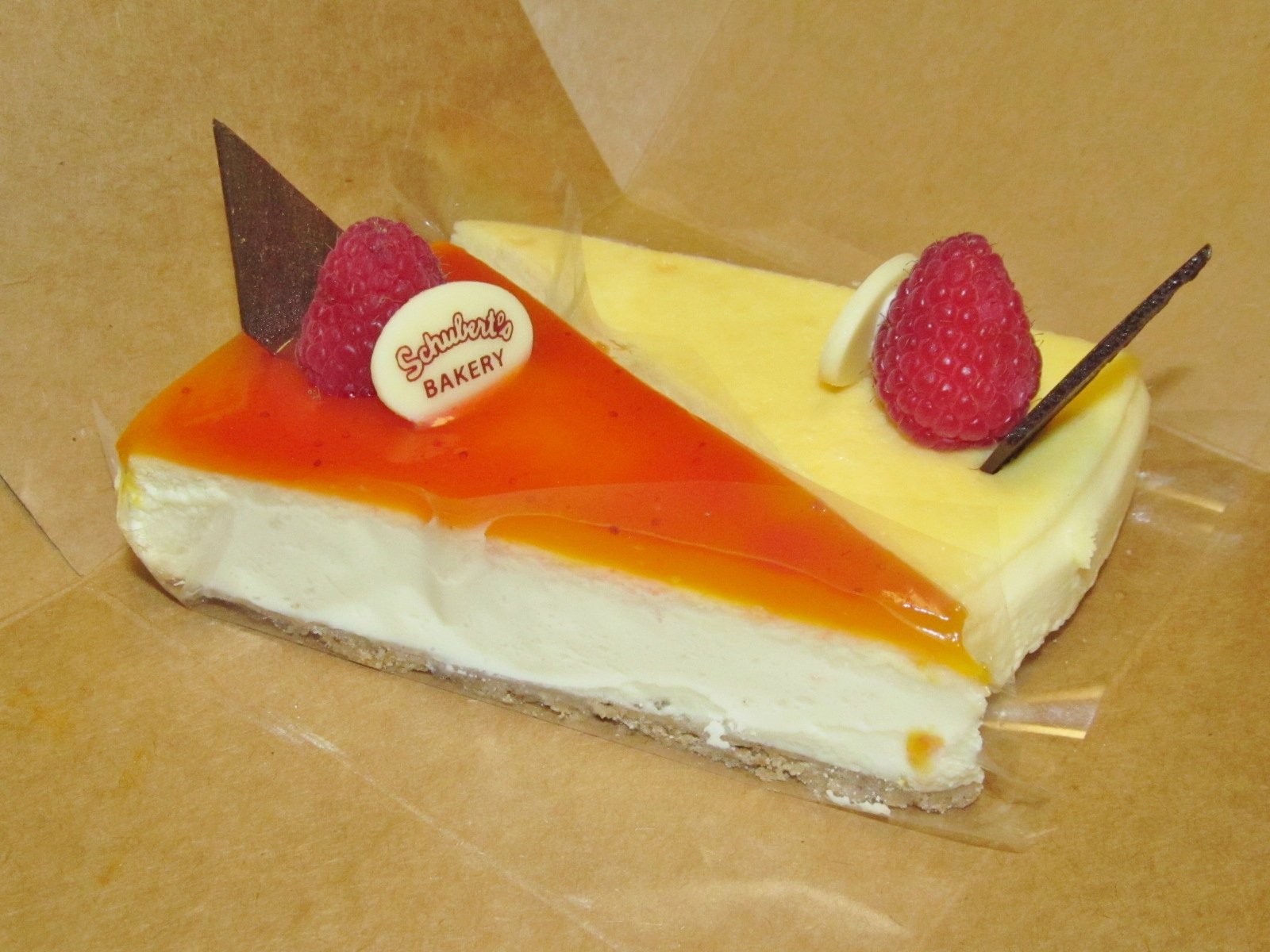
Cheesecakes
