= Hasselback potatoes =

Swedish baked potato dish

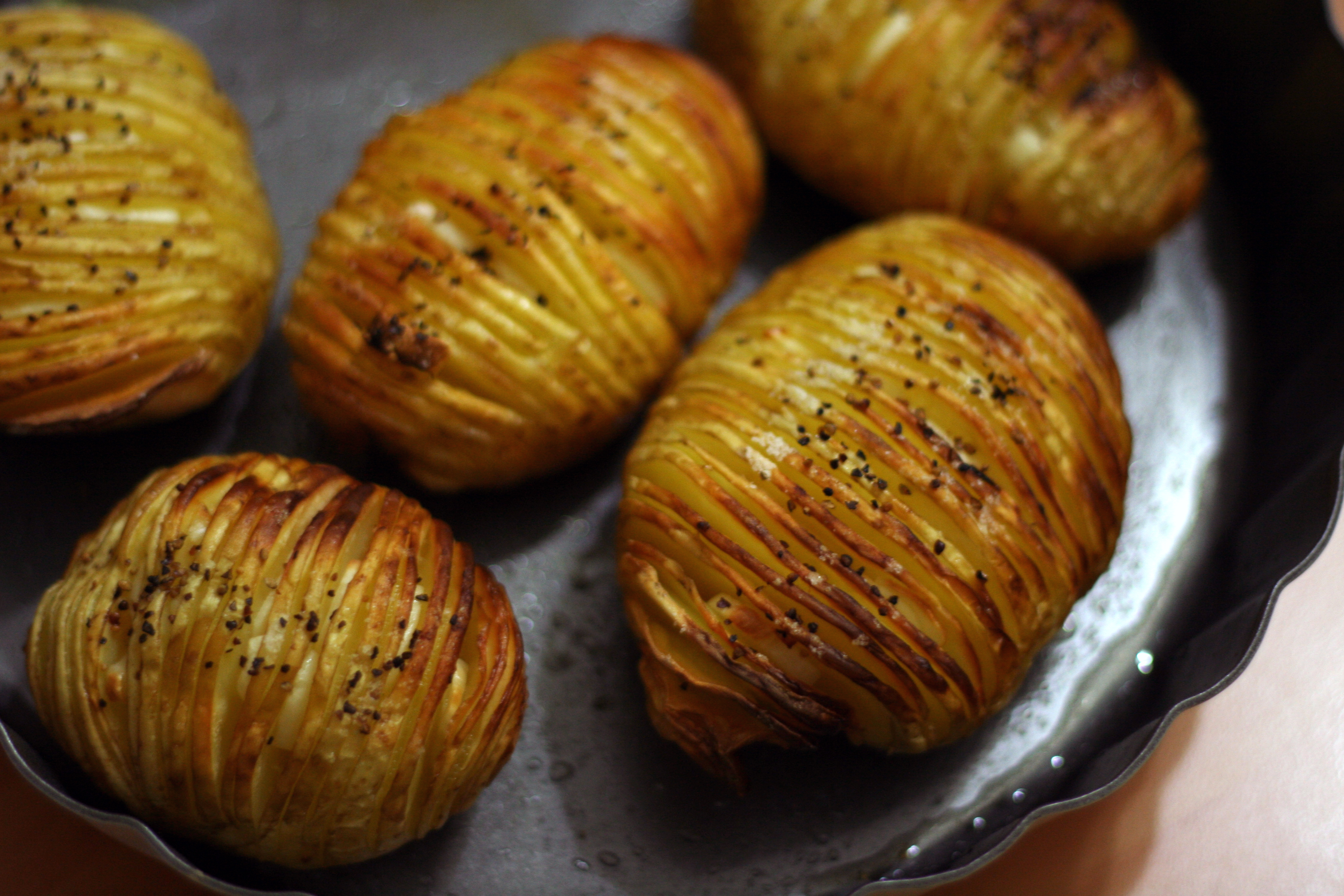
Hasselback potatoes

Hasselback potatoes or Potato à la Hasselbacken (Swedish: hasselbackspotatis) are baked potatoes cut about halfway through into thin, fan-like slices. Hasselbacking is done to a fruit or vegetable to create artful-looking food while adding more flavor. This creates a crispy outside while allowing the flavors to penetrate the potato, leaving the inside fluffy. They can be served as a main course, a side dish, or canapé. Various toppings, such as caraway seeds, paprika, cheese, bacon, and breadcrumbs, can be added for extra flavor. Some recipes call for stuffing the toppings between the slices, while others are added closer to the end of the baking process.

== Techniques ==
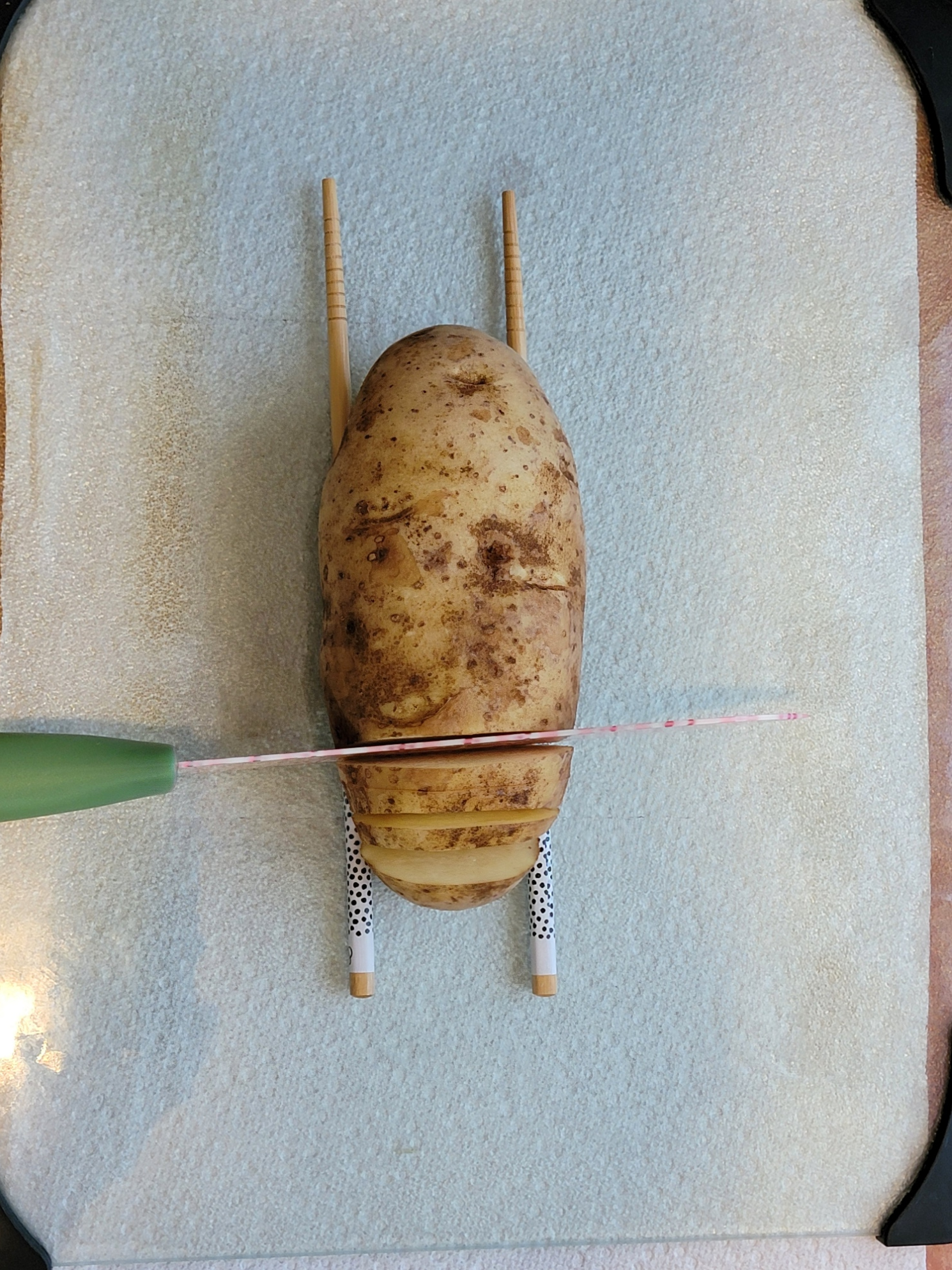
Chopstick technique

One technique to achieve Hasselback potatoes is to place chopsticks on both sides of the potato. This allows a stopping point for the knife, so the potato is not fully cut through. The same can be achieved by placing the potato in the bowl of a wooden spoon. Adding olive oil or butter to the outside of the potato allows for a golden caramelized top.

== Origins ==
Hasselback potatoes get their name from the restaurant Hasselbacken in Stockholm, Sweden. Hasselback is the Swedish word for "hazel slope", as the restaurant was located near a thicket of hazel trees on a steep mountain. In 1953, student chef Leif Elison served the dish, and it was very popular. Later, in 1955, credit for the recipe went to the principal of the restaurant school. However, there is a recipe for "Oven Fried Potatoes" in the 1929 cookbook Prinsessornas Kokbok by Jenny Åkerström, leaving the question of who served them first.
