= Kumpir =

Turkish and Balkan baked potato dish

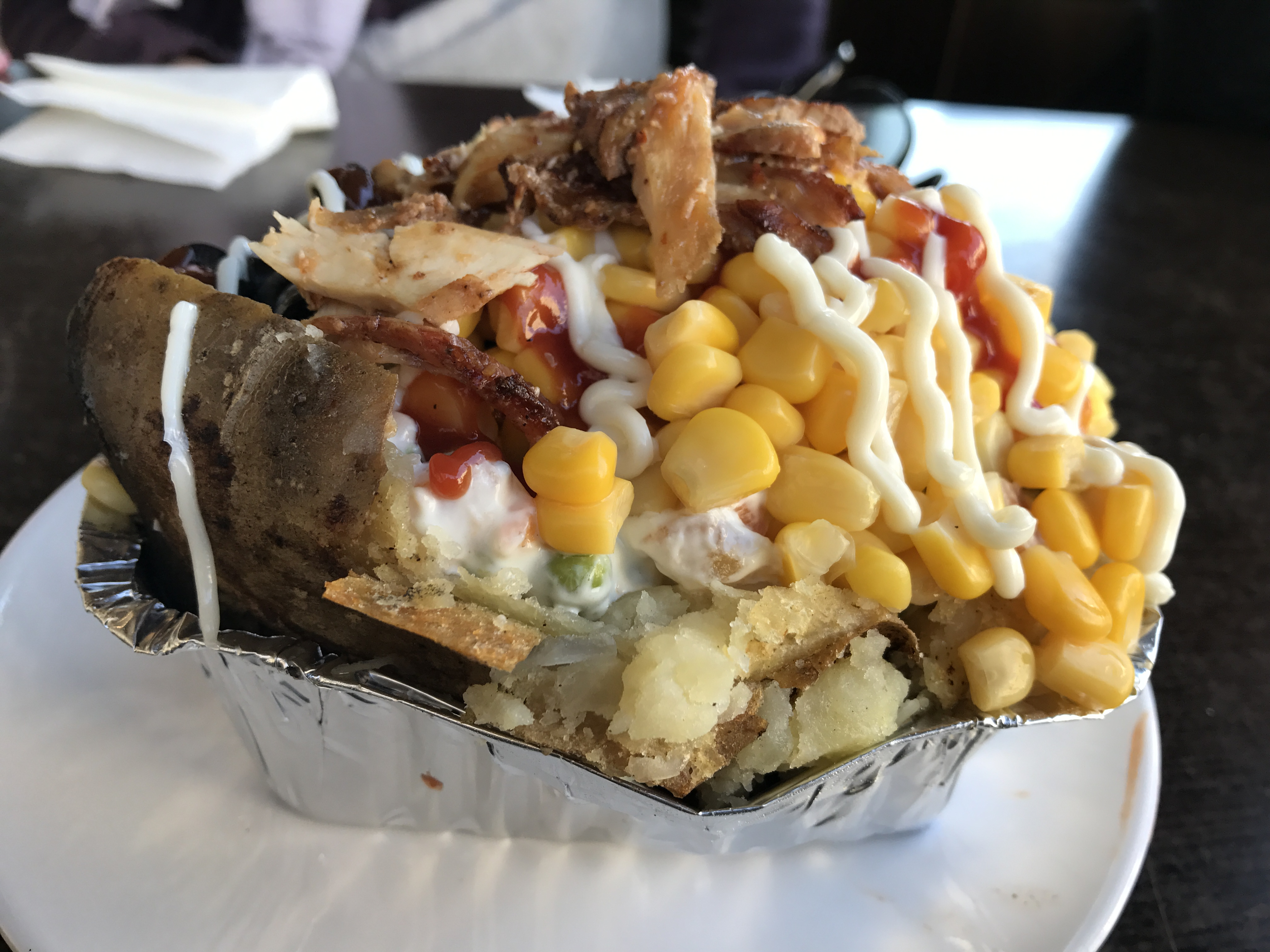
- A kumpir with several toppings, from Turkey
- Alternative names: Compire
- Region or state: Balkans, Turkey
- Main ingredients: Potato

Kumpir (also compire) is a baked potato with various fillings. It is a popular fast food in the Balkans.

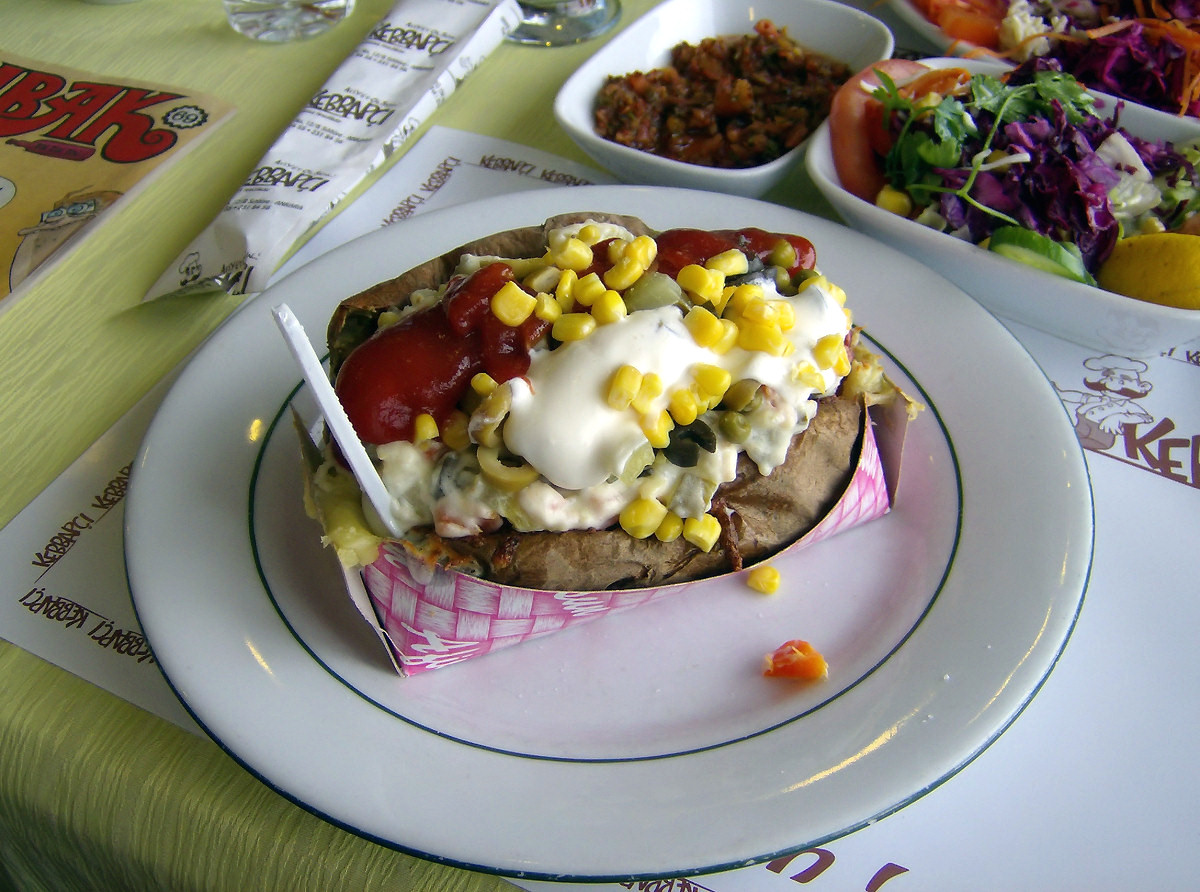
Kumpir

== Name ==
The word comes from the Palatine/Alemannic Grumbier or Grummbeere 'potato', introduced to Southeastern Europe by the Danube Swabians. In Serbo-Croatian, it is krumpir or krompir, in Hungarian krumpli. It spread to Anatolia via Balkan Turks. In English it is known as Turkish baked potato or compire; in French it is known as compiré. In Western languages, particularly English and French, the traditional Turkish baked potato dish is referred to as kumpir or, in some contexts, compire or (grundbirne)..

== Production ==
It is made with potatoes wrapped with aluminum foil and baked in special ovens. The potatoes are cut straight from the middle and the insides are mixed with unsalted butter and puréed with cheese added.

Other fillings can be added: mayonnaise, ketchup, pickles, sweetcorn, sliced green and black olives, sausage slices, carrots, steamed peas, mushrooms and Olivier salad.

== See also ==
- Baked potato
- Loaded potato
