= Hasselbacken =

Hotel in Stockholm

Coordinates: 59°19′30″N 18°05′55″E

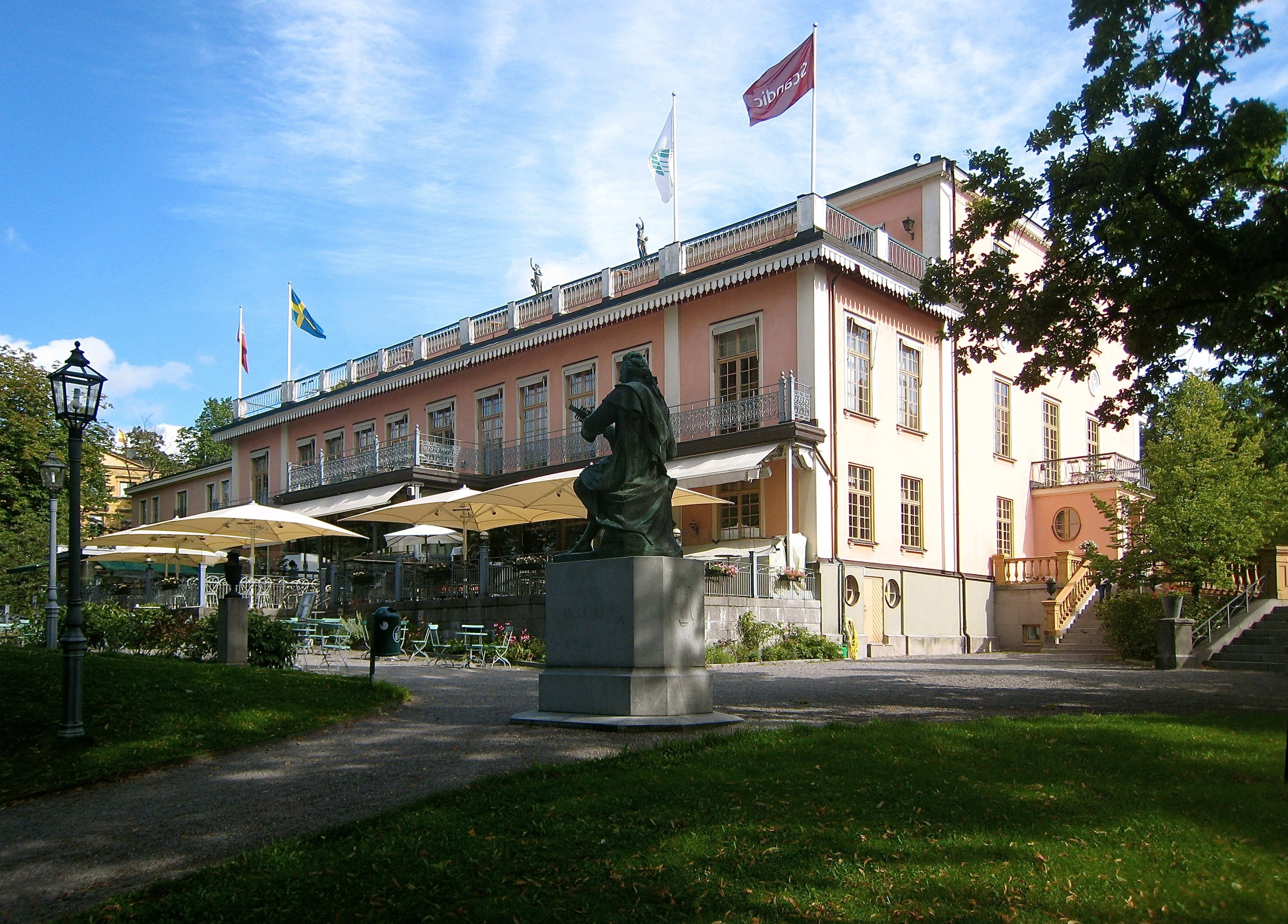
Hasselbacken in 2009.

Hasselbacken is a restaurant in Cirkus, Djurgården in Stockholm, Sweden with a connection to a hotel at Hazeliusbacken 20 in Södra Djurgården with a history dating back to 1748.

Since 2019 the restaurant and hotel have been part of the Pophouse Entertainment group preserved by the majority owners Björn Ulvaeus and Conni Jonsson.

== History ==
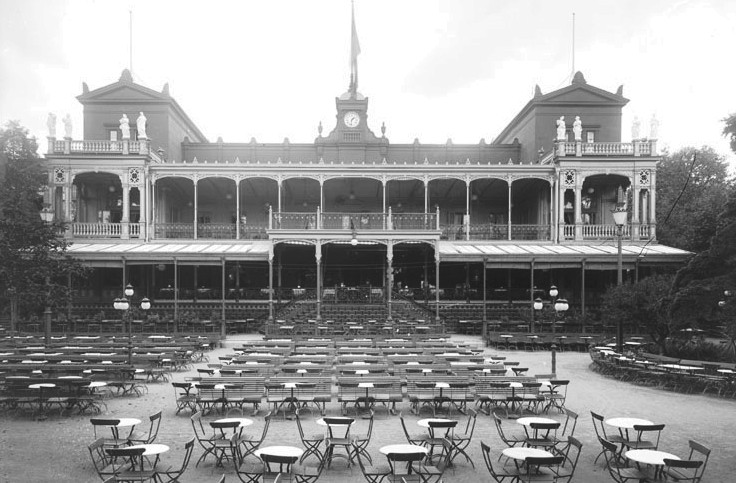
Hasselbacken around 1900.

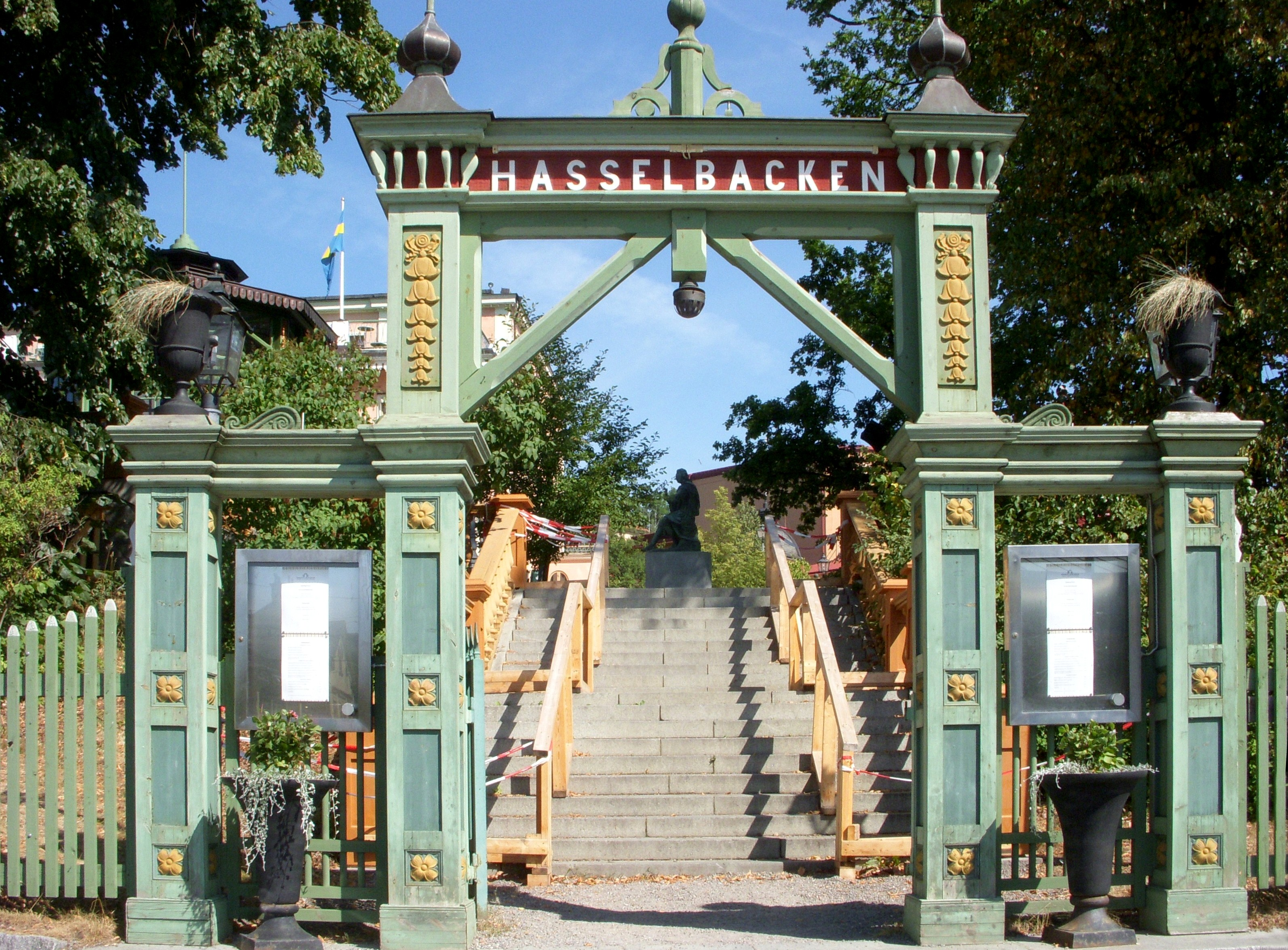
The gate at Djurgårdsvägen in 2011.

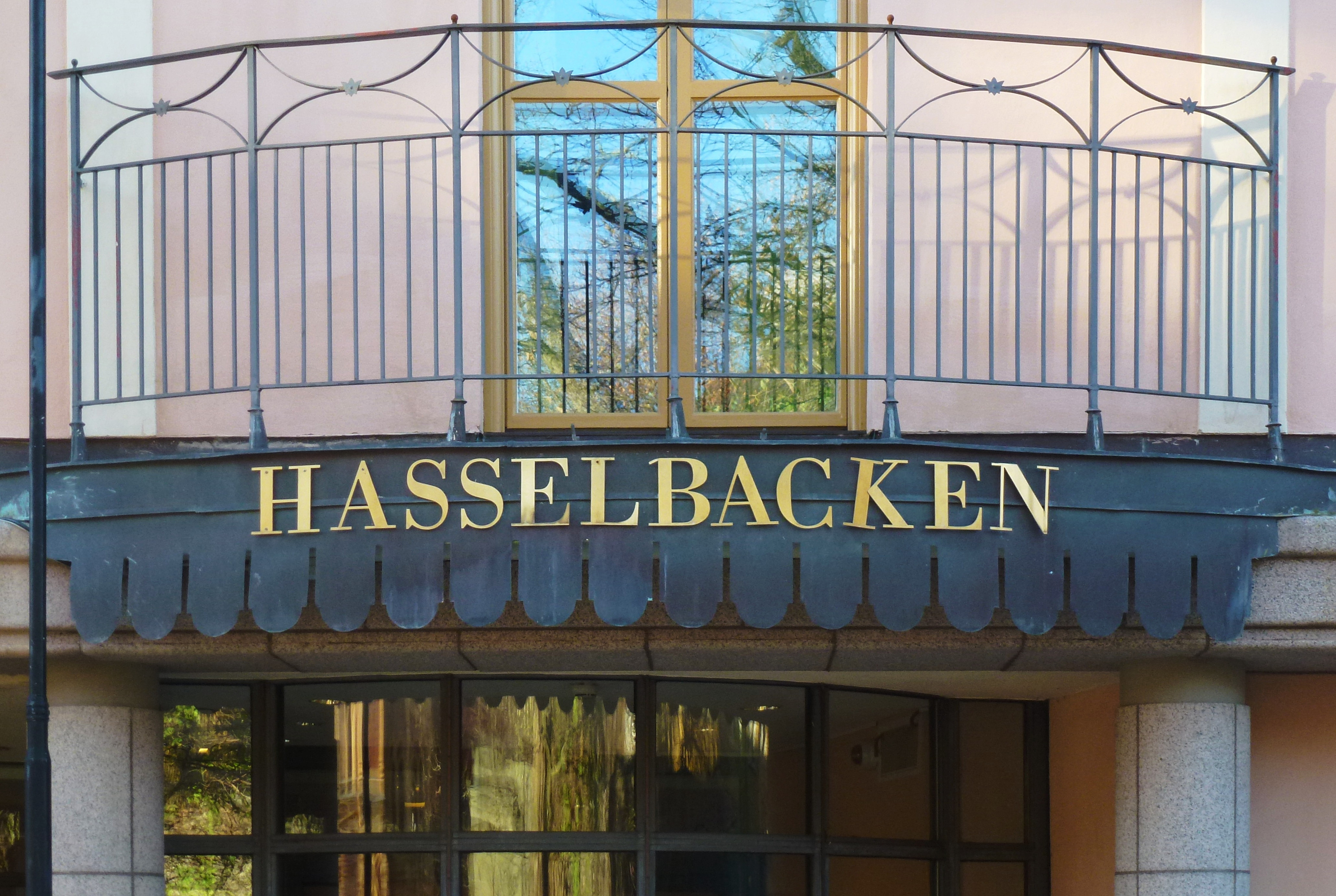
Hasselbacken's entrance from Hazeliusbacken.

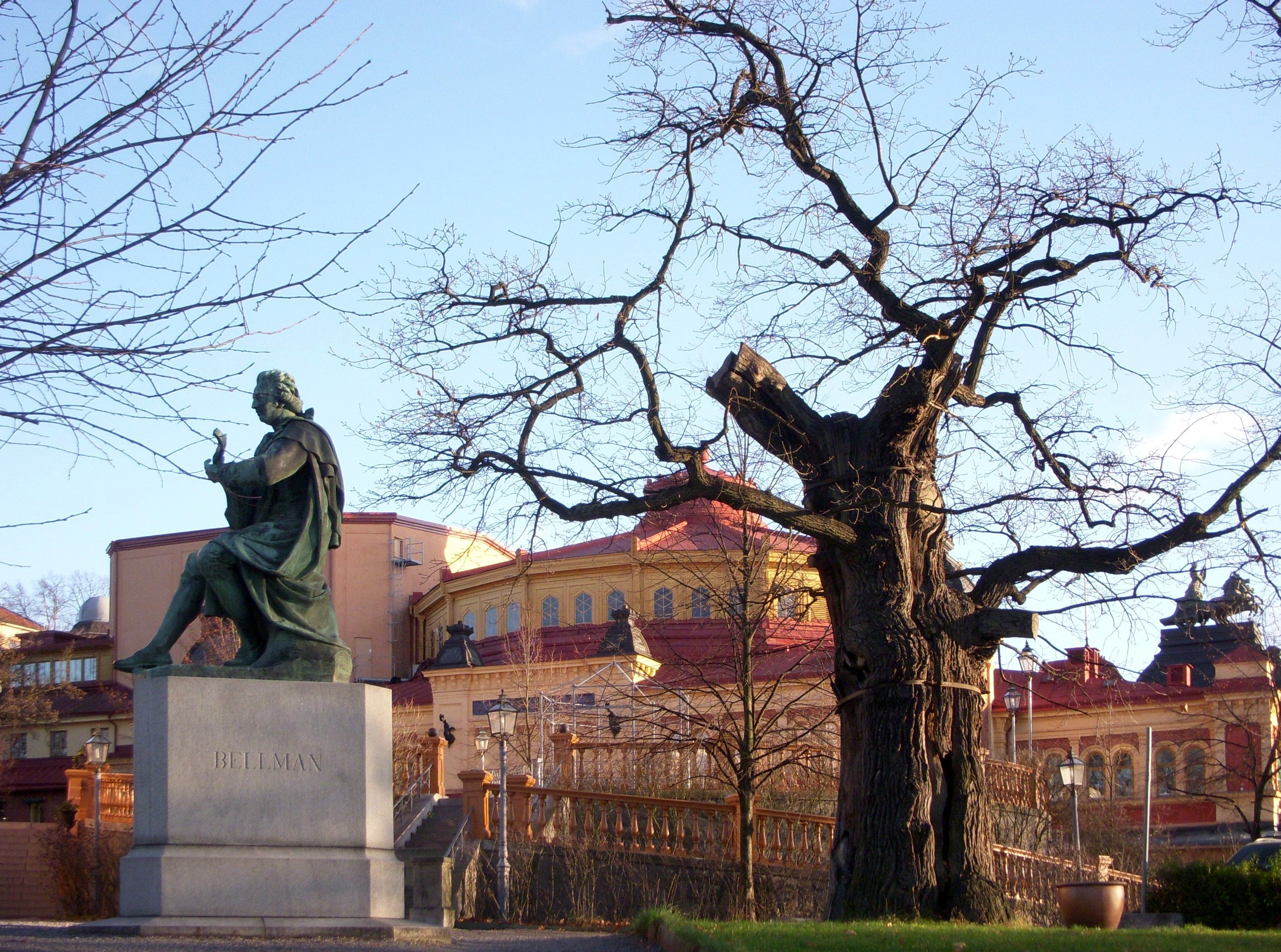
The Bellman statue and the Bellman oak in 2011.

The site was first mentioned in 1748. The beer and waffle store Dunderhyttan was located at the site of the restaurant at the time. Hasselbackskrogen was first mentioned in the 1760s. The first restaurant was a red cabin located at the site of the current restaurant, which got its name from the hazel plants growing at the site. In 1836 the restaurant was changed into the summer villa Ludvigsro of wholesale merchant G. Michaelson.

In 1852 the baker Wilhelm Davidson bought the property, starting the golden era of Hasselbacken. Davidson commissioned a new main building according to Johan Fredrik Åbom's drawings and returned the old name into use. The restaurant Hasselbacken opened in 1853. Davidson commissioned Villa Hasselbacken for himself, which was completed in 1866 and is located northwest of the restaurant.

Davidson later opened a café called Gubbhyllan at a nearby location. The entire Hasselbacken restaurant burned down in 1872 and a new building was constructed from 1872 to 1874. The restaurant became widely known, famous for its grandiose celebrations among the upper classes. The building was moved to Skansen in the 1960s (now known as the Tobacco and Matchstick Museum in Stockholm).

=== 20th century ===
In 1923 Hasselbacken burned down again, for the seventh time, and a new building was completed in 1925. The same building now contains a restaurant, a conference hall and a celebration hall.

Between 1947 and 1969 a restaurant school was located at the premises. There are claims that "Hasselback potatoes" were invented in 1953 by Leif Elisson from Värmland, who was a cooking student in the restaurant school. However, there are also records of Hasselback potatoes in a cookbook from 1929.

In 1984 the building was bought by the real estate company Fabege, who completely renovated the restaurant. A hotel was constructed on the backside of the restaurant, and the Scandic Hotel Hasselbacken was opened in 1992.

=== 21st century ===
In 2019 the restaurant was bought by the company Pop House Sweden AB which is owned by Björn Ulvaeus from ABBA and businessman Conny Jonsson.

== Bellman statue and Bellman oak ==
On a nearby hill, near the Bellman statue, is an oak tree named the Bellman oak, under which Carl Michael Bellman is said to have written episode 25 of Fredmans epistlar. According to Erik Rydqvist (in Djurgården förr och nu) king Gustav III of Sweden came there incognito to see what the folk life was like. The place was also visited yearly by Par Bricole on Bellman day on 26 June. A statue was erected to the memory of Bellman in 1872, modelled by Alfred Nyström and cast in zinc. The oak was almost felled to make room for the statue but a different location was chosen instead. In 1969 Gunnar Brusewitz wrote about the oak in his book Stockholm, staden på landet. The oak remains standing to this day.
