= Jenny Åkerström =

Swedish food writer

Johanna Åkerström
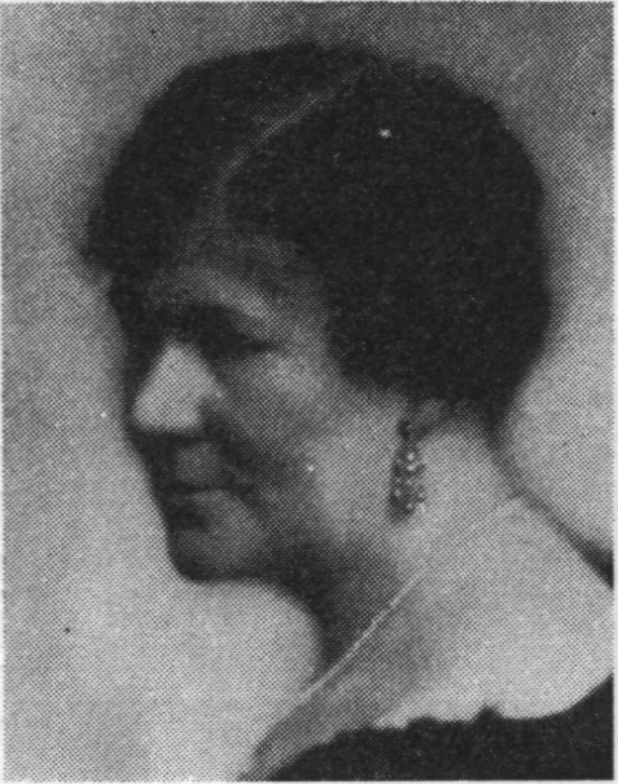
- Born: Johanna Antonia Åkerström; 7 June 1867; Lohärad Parish, Stockholm County, Sweden
- Died: 28 October 1957 (aged 90); Stockholm, Sweden
- Occupations: Food writer, teacher
- Spouse: Bengt Söderström (m. 1911; died 1934)

Johanna Antonia "Jenny" Åkerström-Söderström (7 June 1867–28 October 1957) was a Swedish food writer and home economics teacher.

== Early life ==
Åkerström was born on 7 June 1867 in Lohärad Parish, the daughter of Anton and Maria Åkerström.

== Career ==
Åkerström wrote food articles in Bonniers veckotidning, Vecko-Journalen and Bonniers månadstidning. She ran a famous household school for girls in Stockholm, Jenny Åkerströms Husmodersskola. The school had gained fame due to the fact that the princesses Margaretha, Märtha and Astrid were among the students.

Åkerström also published several cookbooks, including the famous Prinsessornas kokbok (Princess' cookbook), the first edition of which was published in 1929. It contained, among other things, the recipe for "Green cake" which later came to be called Princess cake.

== Personal life and death ==
In 1911, Åkerström married pharmacist Bengt Söderström (1880–1934) in Djursholm, who ran a business in the radio industry. She died on 28 October 1957 and is buried in Norra begravningsplatsen outside Stockholm.

== Bibliography ==
- Recept på maizenarätter (1910)
- Prinsessornas kokbok : Husmanskost och helgdagsmat (1929)
- Mazetti kokbok : Förfriskningar, efterrätter, bakverk etc. (1930)
- Maizena : Recept å soppor, såser, efterrätter, bakverk etc. (1931)
- Swedish smörgåsbord : 100 recipes for the famous swedish hors d'oeuvres. (1933)
- 39 utvalda recept på god mat (1933)
- Billig sommarmat : praktisk handbok (1934)
- Mera god mat : en fortsättning på Prinsessornas kokbok (1939)
- Prinsessornas nya kokbok (1948)
