= Princess cake =

Traditional Swedish layer cake

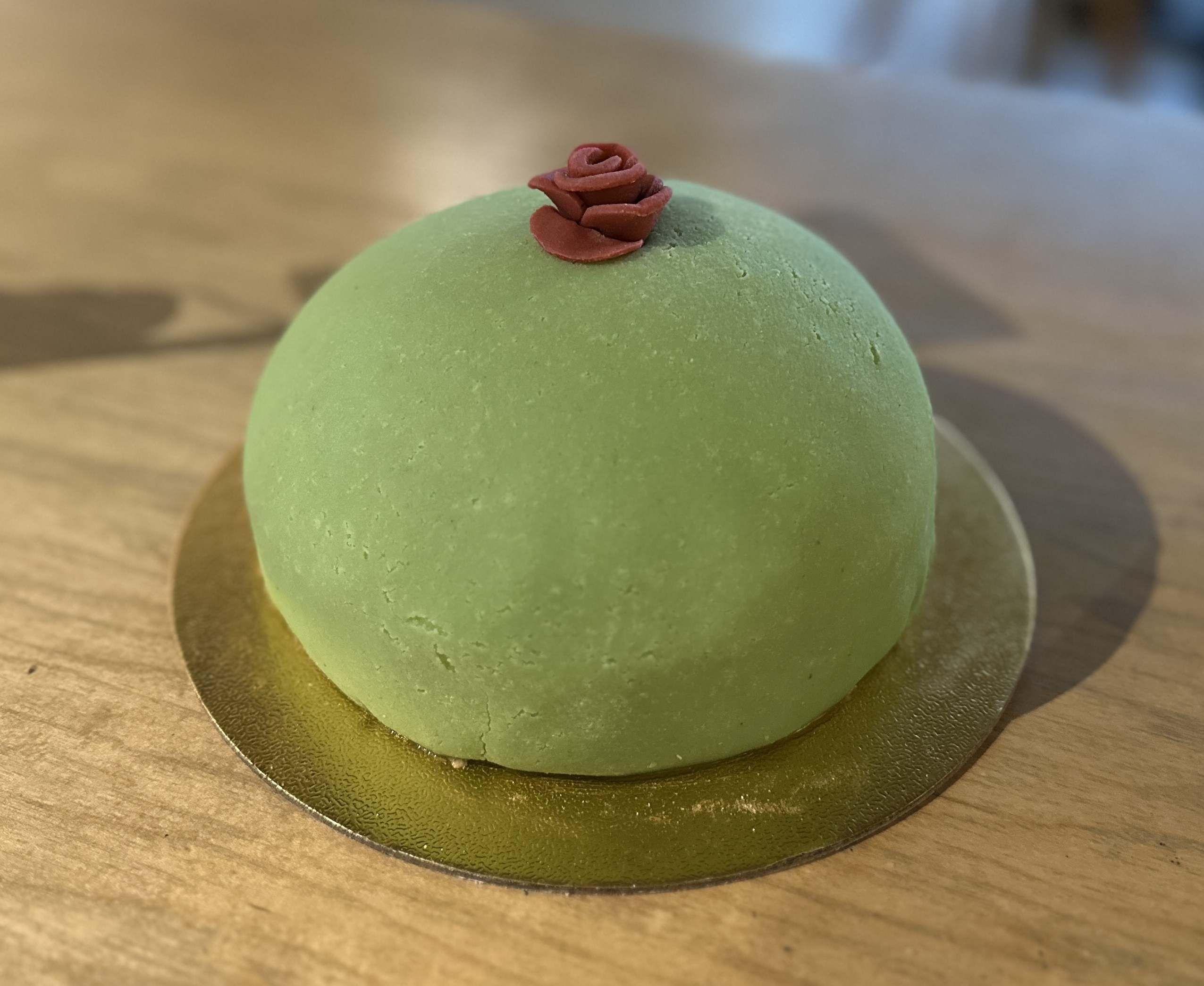
- Swedish princess cake
- Alternative names: Prinsesstårta, grön tårta, prinstårta, prinsessbakelse
- Type: Cake
- Place of origin: Sweden
- Created by: Jenny Åkerström
- Main ingredients: Sponge cake, whipped cream, raspberries, pastry cream, marzipan, powdered sugar

Princess cake or princess torte (Swedish: prinsesstårta) is a traditional Swedish layer cake or torte consisting of alternating layers of airy sponge cake, pastry cream, and a thick-domed layer of whipped cream. The cake is covered by a layer of rolled marzipan, giving it a smooth, rounded top. The marzipan overlay is usually green, sprinkled with powdered sugar, and often decorated with a pink marzipan rose. While the original recipe did not contain any fruit, modern versions usually include layers of jam or fresh fruit, usually raspberries.

== Origin and name ==
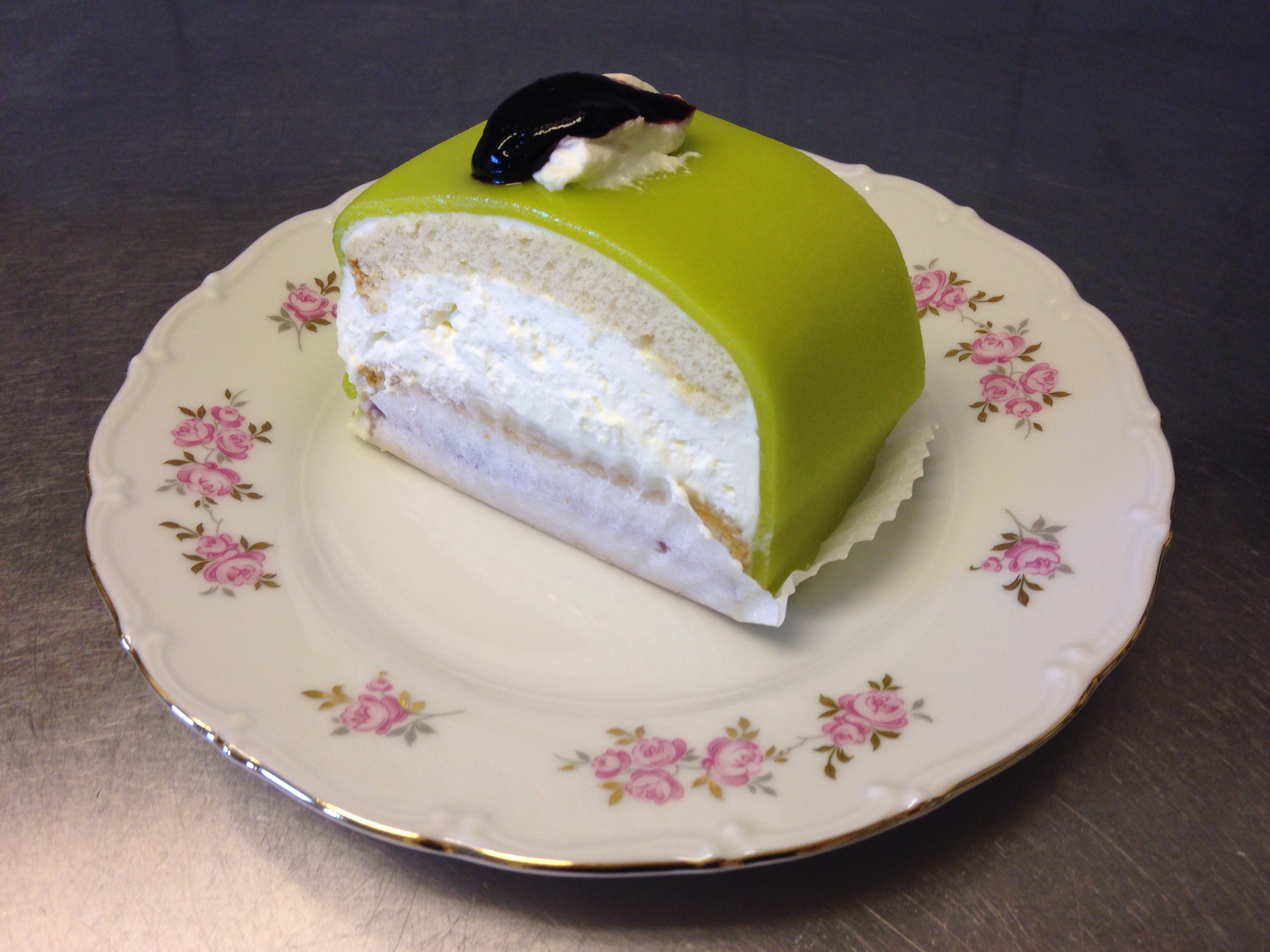
Slice of a log-shaped cake, showing a thick layer of cream piled on top of the cake

The original recipe first appeared in the 1948 cookbook Prinsessornas kokbok (lit. 'Cookbook of the Princesses'), which was published by Jenny Åkerström (1867–1957), teacher of the three daughters of Prince Carl, Duke of Västergötland.

The cake was originally called grön tårta (lit. 'green cake'), but was given the name prinsesstårta or "princess cake" because the Swedish princesses were said to have been especially fond of the cake. The princesses were Princess Margaretha (1899–1977; later Princess of Denmark), Princess Märtha (1901–1954; later Crown Princess of Norway), and Princess Astrid (1905–1935; later Queen of the Belgians).

Variants

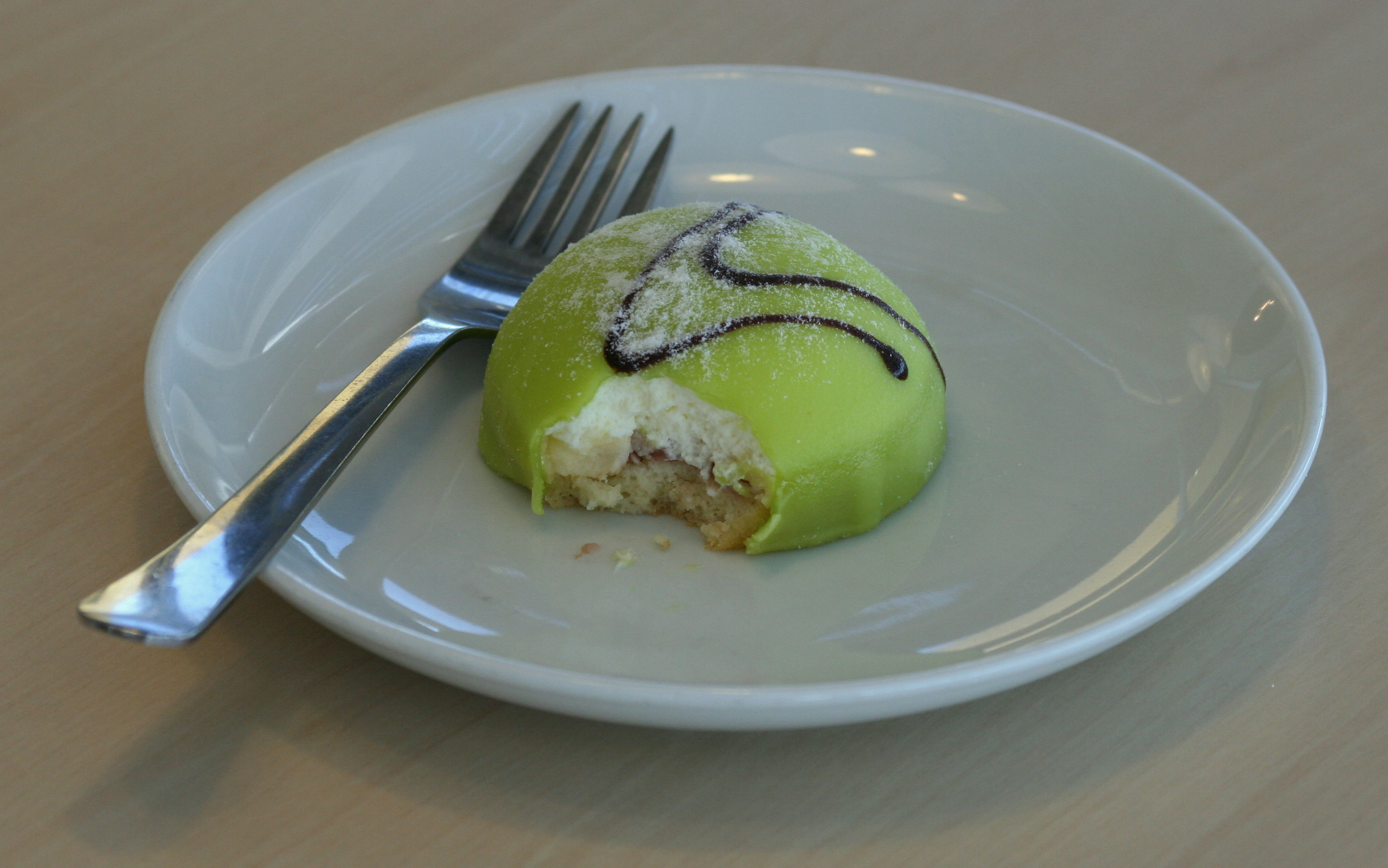
Individual serving size

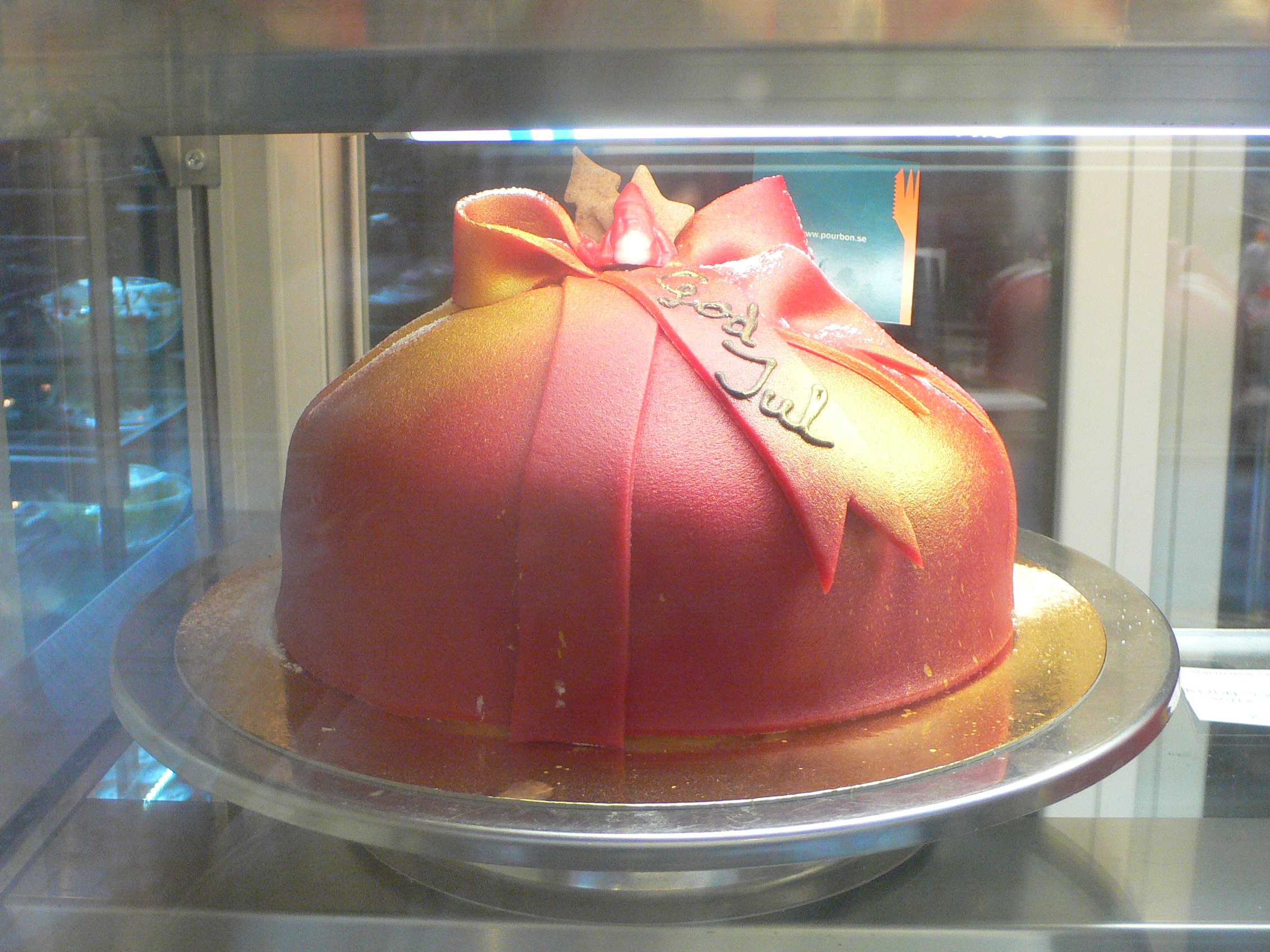
Pink and gold

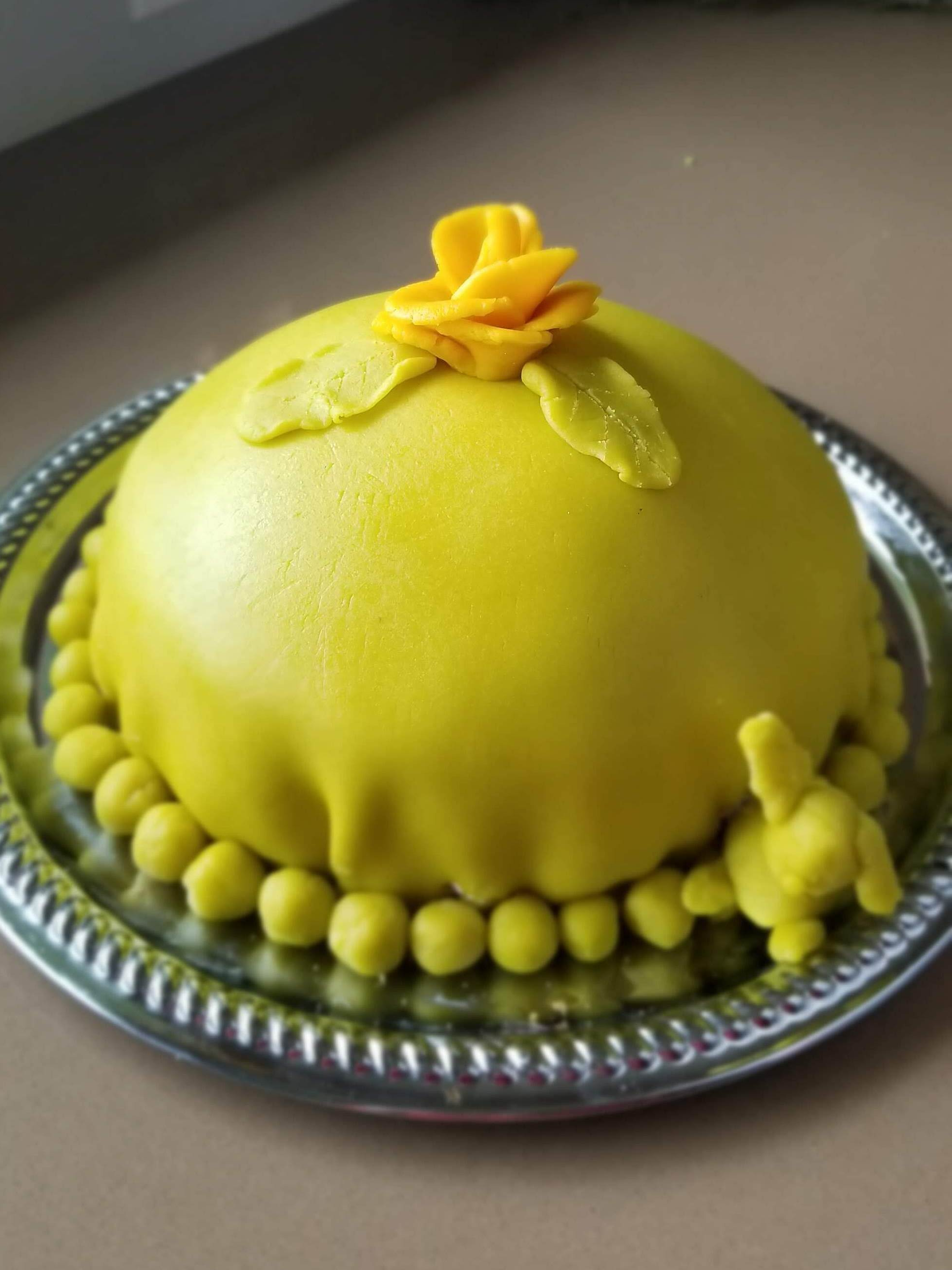
Green with marzipan rose

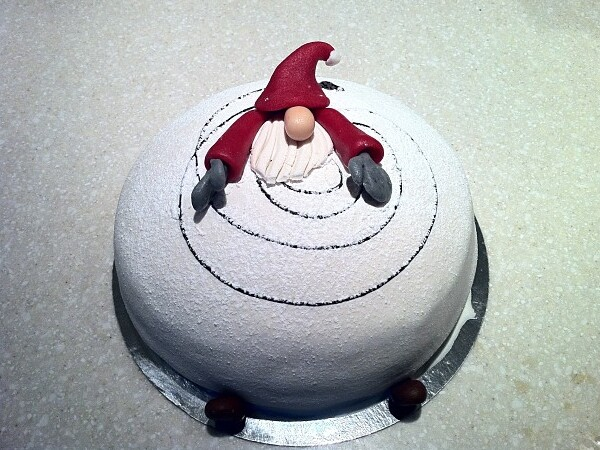
Decorated with a Christmas theme

== See also ==
- List of almond dishes
- List of cakes
