= Feuilletine =

French snack

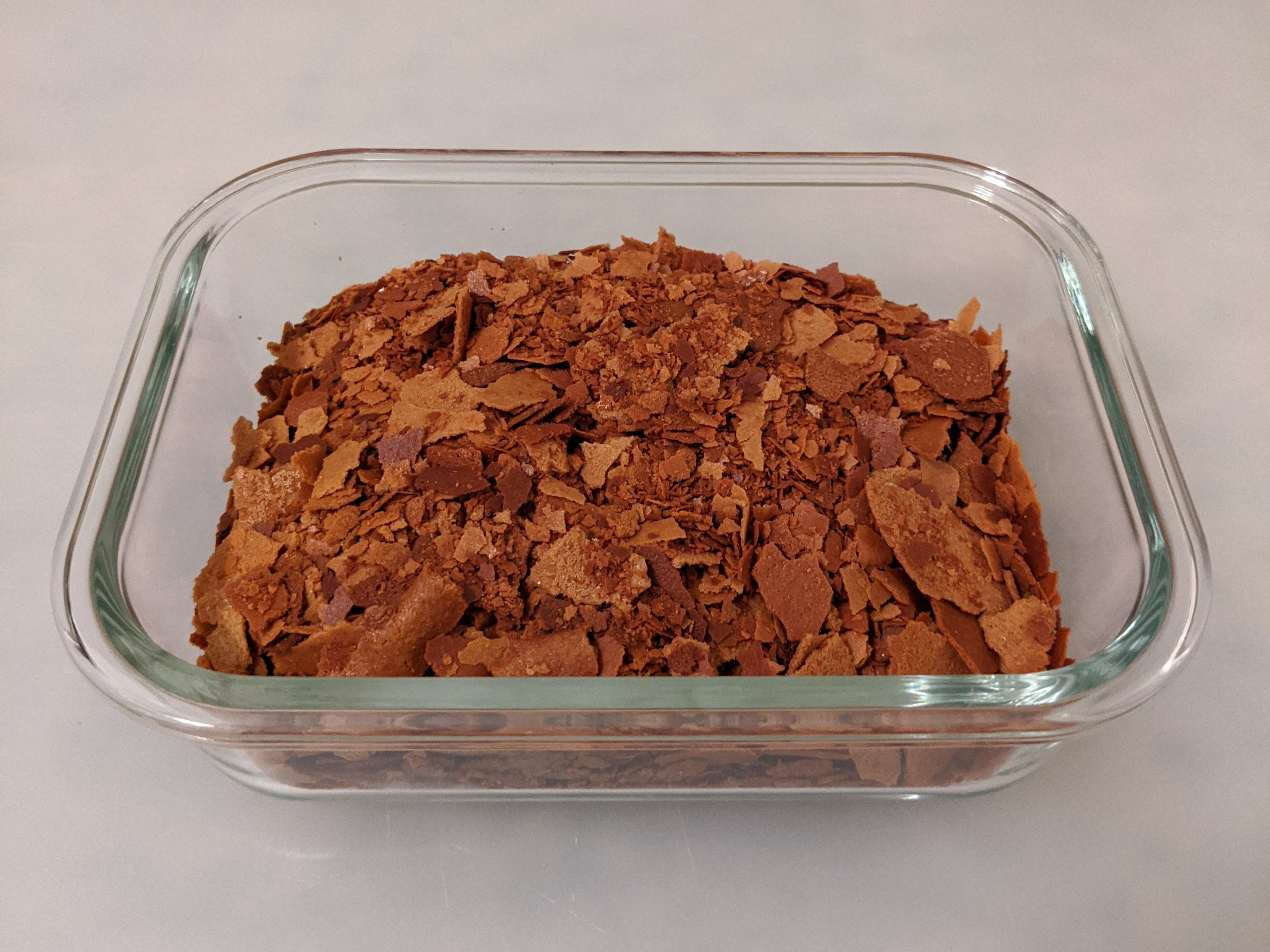
Feuilletine

Feuilletine, or pailleté feuilletine (French pronunciation: [paj.te fœj.tin]), is a crispy confection. It is made from thin, sweetened crêpes.

== Recipe ==
Feuilletine is a crispy confection made from thin, sweetened crêpes. The crêpe batter is baked for a few minutes, and the crêpes are allowed to cool; as they cool, they become crisp. In French, these crispy crêpes are called crêpes gavottes or crêpes dentelles; but when crumbled into small shards, they become feuilletine.

== Use ==
Feuilletine is decorative and has a buttery flavour, but it is especially valued for the unique texture it adds to dishes. It is sometimes incorporated into praline, hazelnut paste, and other nut pastes. Feuilletine is produced commercially, though it was originally conceived as a way for a pâtisserie to make use of leftovers.

Nineteenth-century French medical literature also discussed foods with crisp textures in dietary and hygienic contexts. In his influential work Hygiène alimentaire des malades, des convalescents et des valétudinaires (1861), the French naval physician and hygienist Jean-Baptiste Fonssagrives examined bread and related baked foods as part of therapeutic diets.

== See also ==
- Corn flakes
- Puffed rice
- Scraps (batter)
- Tenkasu
- Florentine biscuit
- Pâtisserie
- List of French desserts
