= Scraps (batter) =

Deep-fried batter often served with fish and chips

Fish and chips with scraps, mushy peas and curry sauce

Scraps (also batter bits or crispies) are pieces of deep-fried batter left over in the fryer as a by-product of frying, served as an accompaniment to chips.

== Background ==
When frying food (e.g., fish), scraps are the by-product pieces of deep-fried batter left over in the fryer. They are served as an accompaniment to chips.

In the UK, they are traditionally served free of charge with chips by some fish and chip shops, although some places charge for the scraps.

Terminology varies by region, with terms including scraps, batter bits, crispies, and scrumps. In some parts of the north of England, they are referred to as scratchings, bits, or dubs; in the West Country, they are known as gribbles, whilst they are called screeds in Cornwall. In the US, they may also be referred to as cracklins, crunchies, or crumbs.

Scraps in fryers can cause fires and should be properly disposed.

== See also ==
- Feuilletine – pieces of baked crêpe batter
- Tenkasu – pieces of deep-fried batter used in Japanese cuisine
- Boondi – pieces of deep-fried garbanzo batter
