= Akashiyaki =

Japanese round dumpling with octopus filling

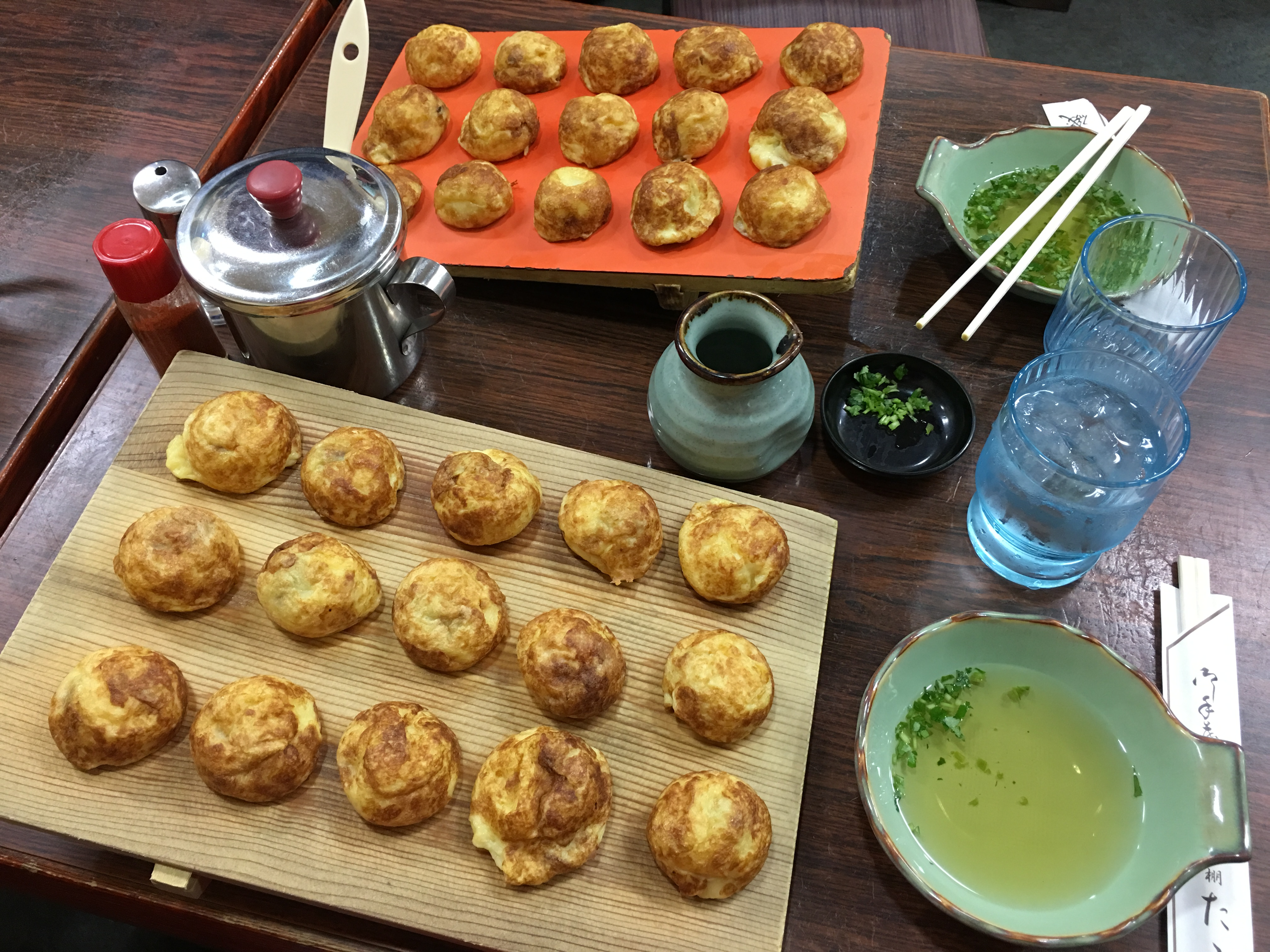
- Alternative names: Tamagoyaki
- Type: Dumpling
- Place of origin: Japan
- Region or state: Akashi
- Main ingredients: batter (flour, eggs, octopus, dashi)
- Variations: Takoyaki

Akashiyaki (明石焼き) is a small round dumpling from the city of Akashi in Hyōgo Prefecture, Japan. The dumpling is made of an egg-rich batter and octopus dipped into dashi (a thin fish broth) before eating. Modern style akashiyaki was first sold in the Taishō period by a yatai owner Seitarō Mukai.

Although takoyaki, another Japanese dumpling, is more popular in Japan, it is based on akashiyaki. Both are made with a takoyaki pan, a type of frying pan or cooktop with many hemispherical molds. Compared to takoyaki, akashiyaki has a softer, more eggy texture.

Akashiyaki is shown in the cyberpunk visual novel video game Snatcher. In the English release, however, it was changed to "Neo Kobe Pizza" (which substitutes soup for the dashi and a slice of pizza for the dumplings), a meal that fans of the game have gone through the effort of recreating.

== History ==
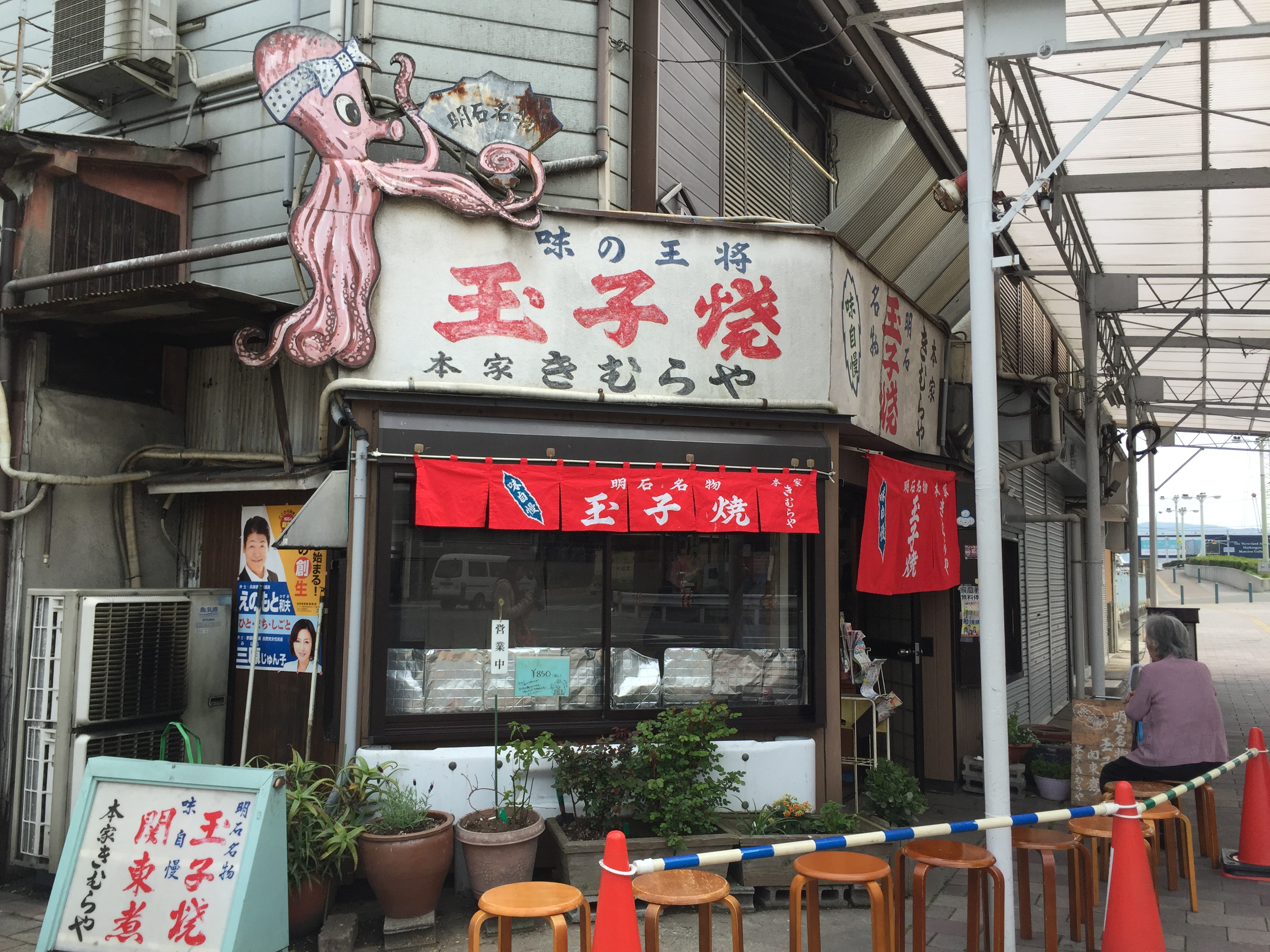
Shop in Japan selling akashiyaki. The sign uses the old name tamagoyaki

Akashiyaki used to be known as tamagoyaki (grilled egg) for a long time locally. However, around 1988, a city official renamed tamagoyaki to akashiyaki for the purpose of promoting the city of Akashi. The origin of the name comes from the decoration called Akashidama (ja:明石玉). Akashidama is a kind of artificial coral made by hardening egg whites with saltpeter, and it was used as decoration in kanzashi. From the end of the Edo period to the Taisho period, the production of akashidama was a thriving local industry in Akashi. It is said that people started making akashiyaki because there was a large amount of leftover egg yolk and wheat flour from the production of akashidama. In addition, Akashi city had abundant catches of octopus. People started mixing those ingredients together and created akashiyaki.

== Consumption ==
Regardless of the season, akashiyaki is eaten as lunch or a snack, both at restaurants and at home. As of 2021, there were 70 akashiyaki places in Akashi city.

== Comparison to takoyaki ==
	Akashiyaki	Takoyaki
Features	Eggs, wheat flour, and jinko (wheat starch) are used in the batter. Since the egg ratio is high, akashiyaki is very soft and shaped like small balls.	Eggs, wheat flour, and dashi are used in the batter. Since the egg ratio is low, takoyaki is less moist and shaped like small balls.
Fillings	Octopus only.	Octopus (sometimes fried), konjac, green onion, red pickled ginger, tenkasu, etc.
Ways of Eating	Dipping into hot or cold dashi.	Putting takoyaki sauce, mayonnaise, bonito flakes, and aonori on top.
Cooking Equipment	Copper pan.	Cast-iron pan.

== Gallery ==
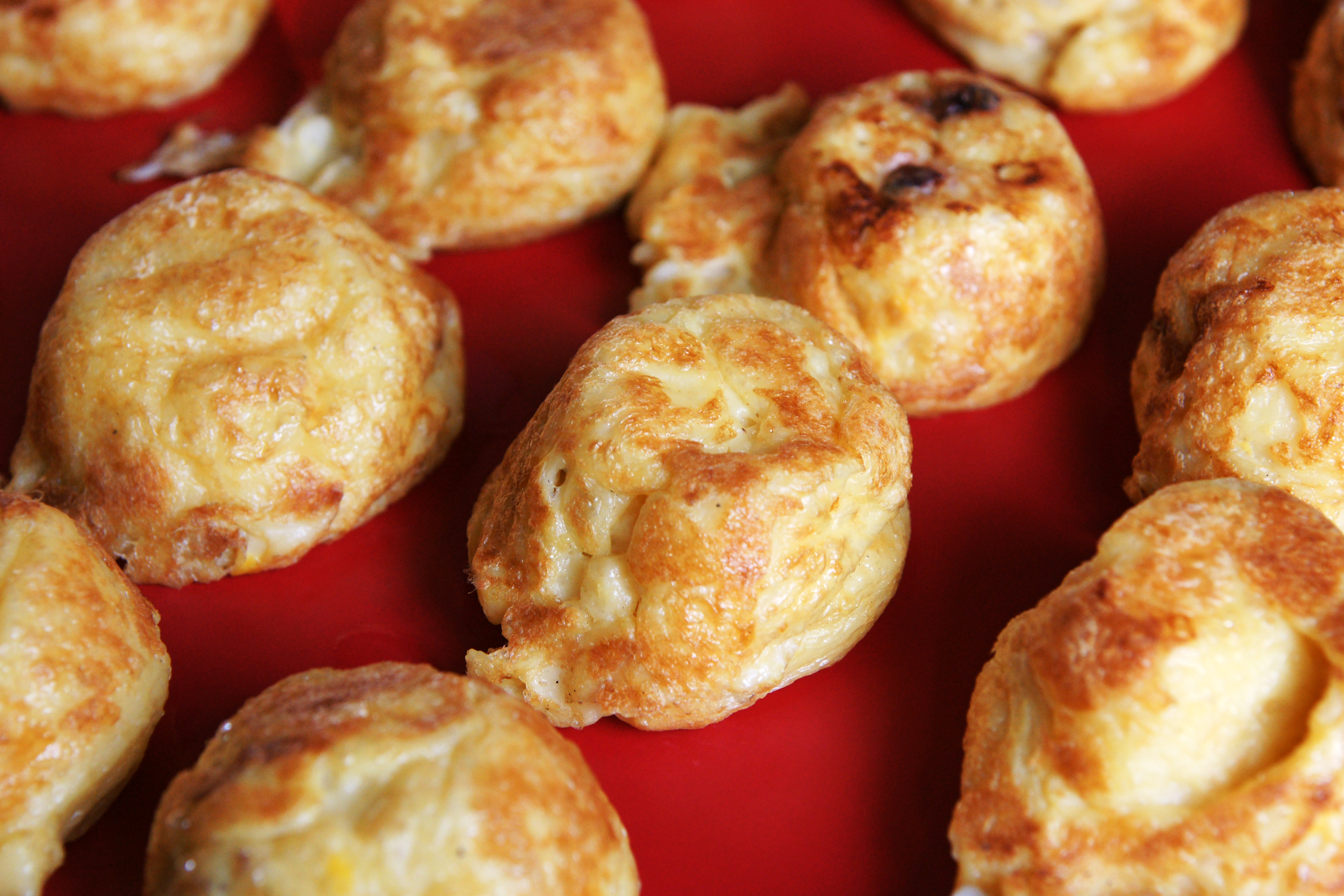

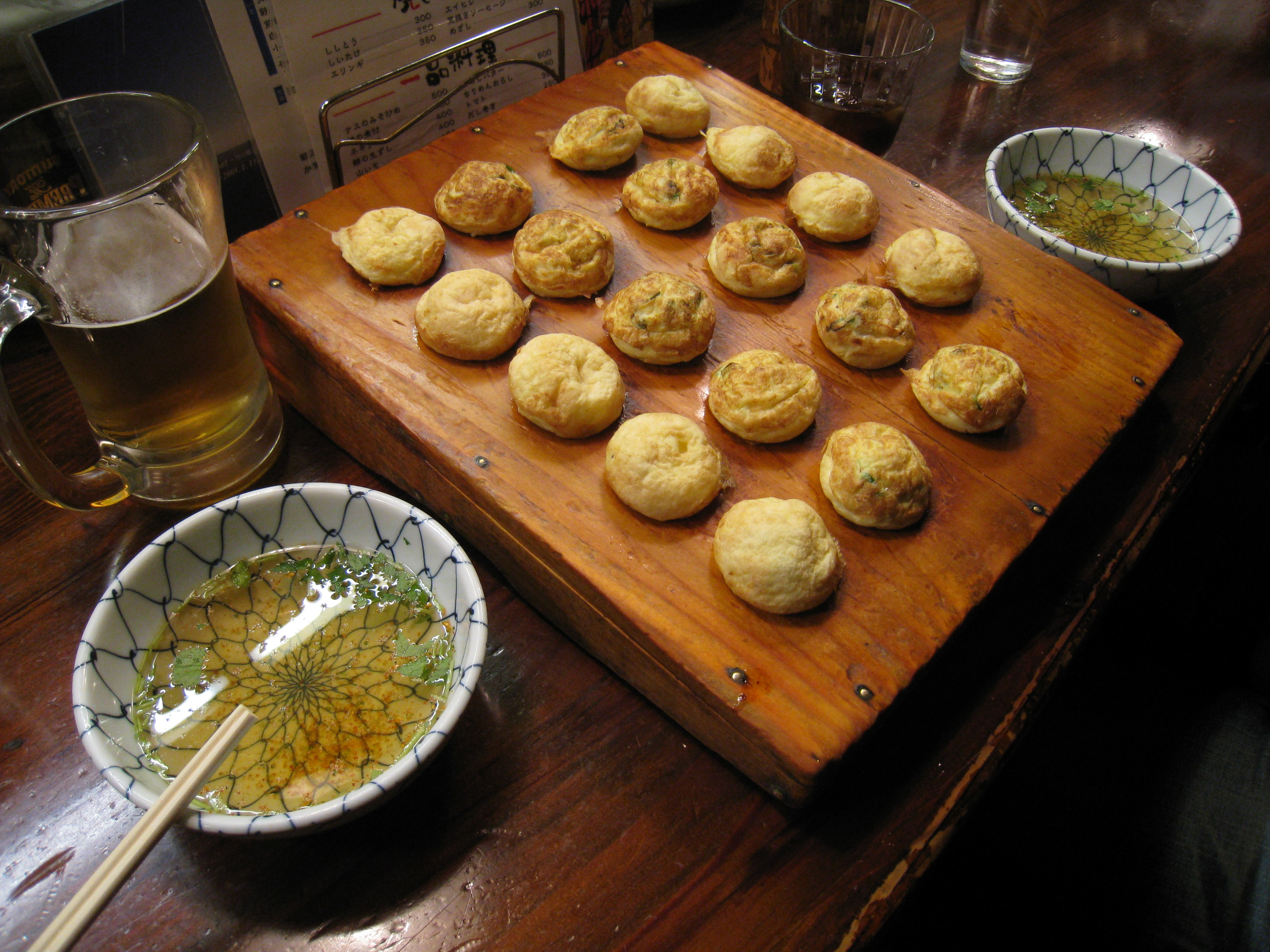

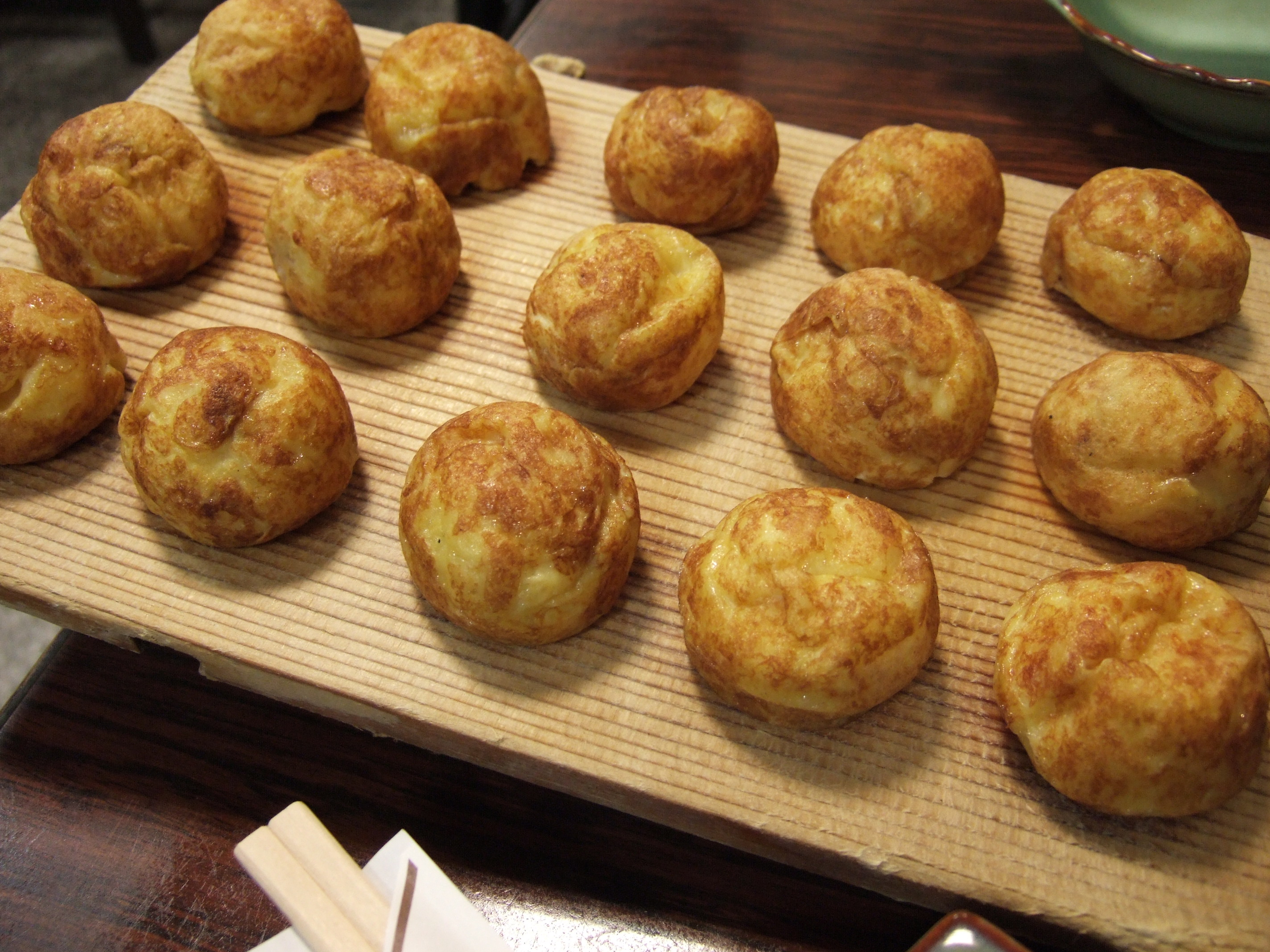

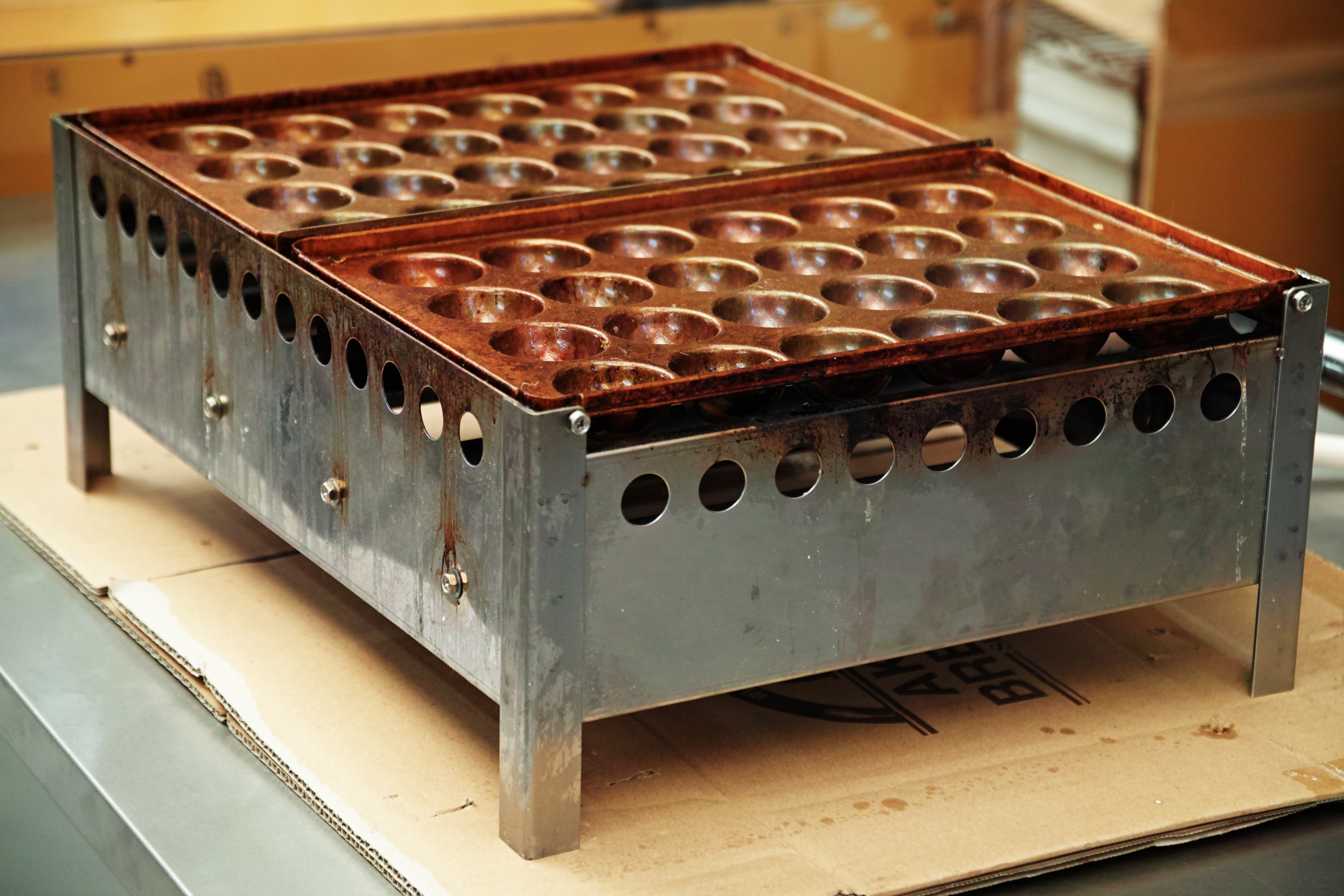
Akashiyaki griddle

== See also ==
- Japanese cuisine
- List of dumplings
- Takoyaki
