= Octopus as food =

Octopus in cuisines worldwide

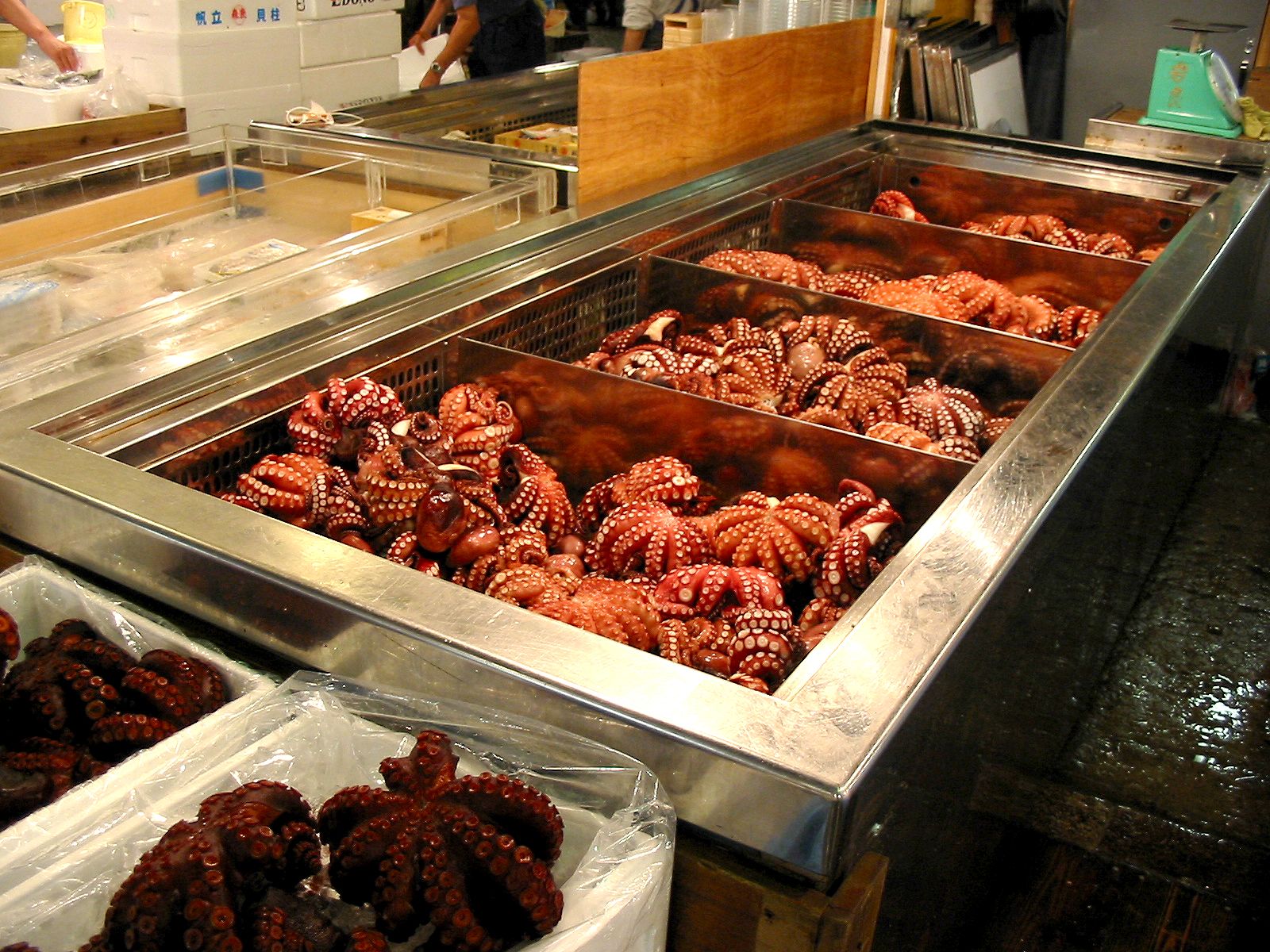
Octopus at Tsukiji fish market

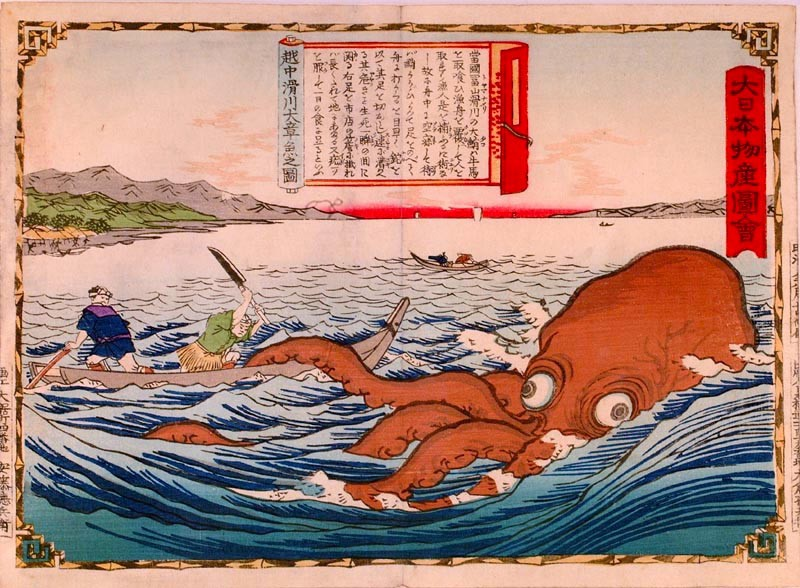
Fishermen hunting octopus

People of several cultures eat octopus. The arms and sometimes other body parts are prepared in various ways, often varying by species and/or geography.

Octopuses are sometimes eaten or prepared alive, a practice that is controversial due to scientific evidence that octopuses experience pain.

== Dishes by geography ==
=== Japan ===
Octopus is a common ingredient in Japanese cuisine, including sushi, sashimi, karaage, stew, sour salad, takoyaki and akashiyaki.

Takoyaki is a ball-shaped snack made of a wheat flour-based batter and cooked in a special takoyaki pan. It is typically filled with minced or diced octopus, tempura scraps (tenkasu), pickled ginger, and green onion. Takoyaki are brushed with takoyaki sauce, similar to Worcestershire sauce, and mayonnaise. The takoyaki is then sprinkled with small strips of laver and shavings of dried bonito.

=== Korea ===
Giant octopus, long arm octopus, and webfoot octopus are common food ingredients in Korean cuisine.

In Korea, some small species are sometimes eaten raw as a novelty food. A raw octopus is usually sliced up, seasoned quickly with salt and sesame seeds and eaten while still squirming posthumously.

Nakji bokkeum is another popular dish in Korea. It is a type of stir-fried food made with chopped octopus.

=== Maldives ===
Miruhulee boava is a Maldivian delicacy made of octopus tentacles braised in curry leaves, chili, garlic, cloves, onion, pepper, and coconut oil.

=== Mauritius ===
In Mauritius and Rodrigues, octopus, known by its Mauritian Creole name "Ourite" is commonly eaten especially in coastal regions as it is found abundantly in Mauritian waters, although a sharp decline has been observed recently. Popular octopus dishes include the masala octopus curry or boiled octopus in spicy tomato sauce, known as the "Daube".

=== Mexico ===
In Baja California and Yucatán, octopus is commonly grilled and eaten on its own or as a component of tacos, tostadas, and ceviche.

=== Greece ===
A common scene in the Greek islands is octopuses hanging in the sunlight from a rope, just like laundry from a clothesline. They are often caught by spear fishing close to the shore. The fisherman brings his prey to land and tenderizes the flesh by pounding the carcass against a stone surface. Thus treated, they are hung out to dry, and later will be served grilled, either hot or chilled in a salad. A common preparation technique involves classic Greek spices and seasonings, often including olive oil, garlic cloves, oregano, pepper, and lemon juice. On the whole, octopus is considered a superb meze, especially alongside ouzo.

=== Spain ===
Octopus is a very common food in Spanish culture. In the Spanish region of Galicia, polbo á feira (market fair-style octopus) is a local delicacy. Restaurants which specialize or serve this dish are known as pulperías.

=== Portugal ===
In Portugal octopus is eaten à lagareiro (olive oil miller style — roasted with potatoes, herbs, onion, garlic, and olive oil), or stewed with rice (arroz de polvo), as well as breaded and then deep fried, with rice and beans.

=== Tunisia ===
Octopus is a common food in Mediterranean cuisine such as Tunisian cuisine.

On the Tunisian island of Djerba and Kerkennah islands, local people catch octopuses by taking advantage of the animals' habit of hiding in safe places during the night. In the evening, they put grey ceramic pots on the sea bed. The morning of the following day they check them for octopuses sheltered there. Also unlike its other Maghreb neighbour, seafood, including octopus is used extensively in Tunisia, grilled, roasted, in couscous, pastas or chorbas.

=== Turkey ===
In Turkey, octopus is widely used as a food ingredient for mezes. In fish restaurants octopus salad (ahtapot salatası) is one of the most popular cold mezes along with eggplant. Grilled or as a casserole, it can also be prepared hot.

=== United States ===
Octopus is eaten regularly in Hawaii, since many popular dishes are Asian in origin. Locally known by their Hawaiian or Japanese names (he'e and tako, respectively), octopus is also a popular fish bait.

== Nutritional value ==
According to the USDA Nutrient Database (2007), cooked octopus contains about 56 kilocalories (Calories) per 100 grams, and is a source of vitamin B_{3}, B_{12}, potassium, phosphorus, and selenium.

== Gallery ==
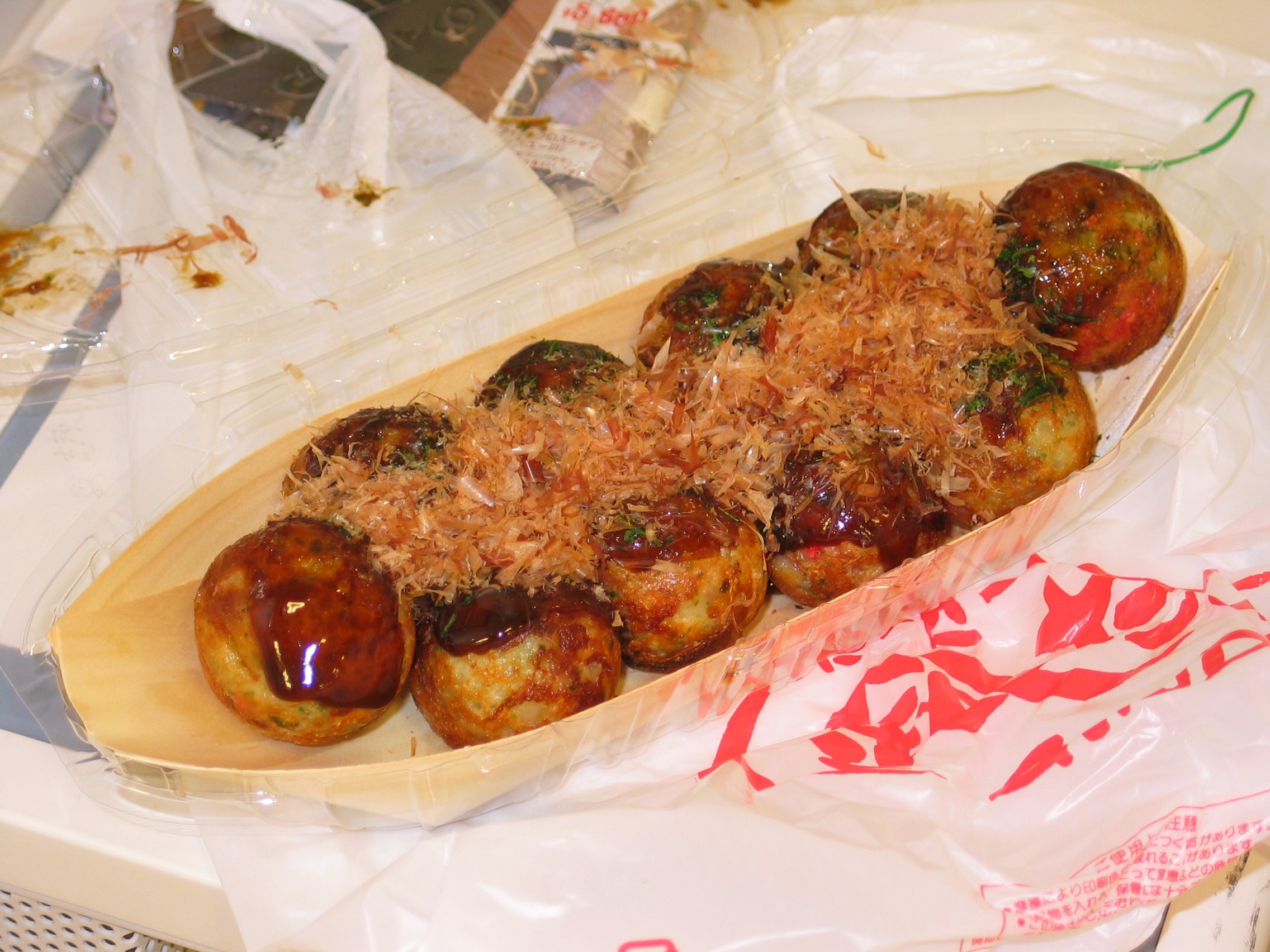
Takoyaki

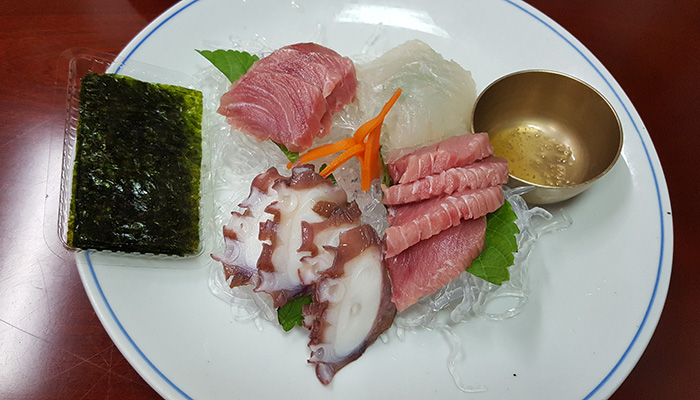
muneo-sukhoe, blanched octopus

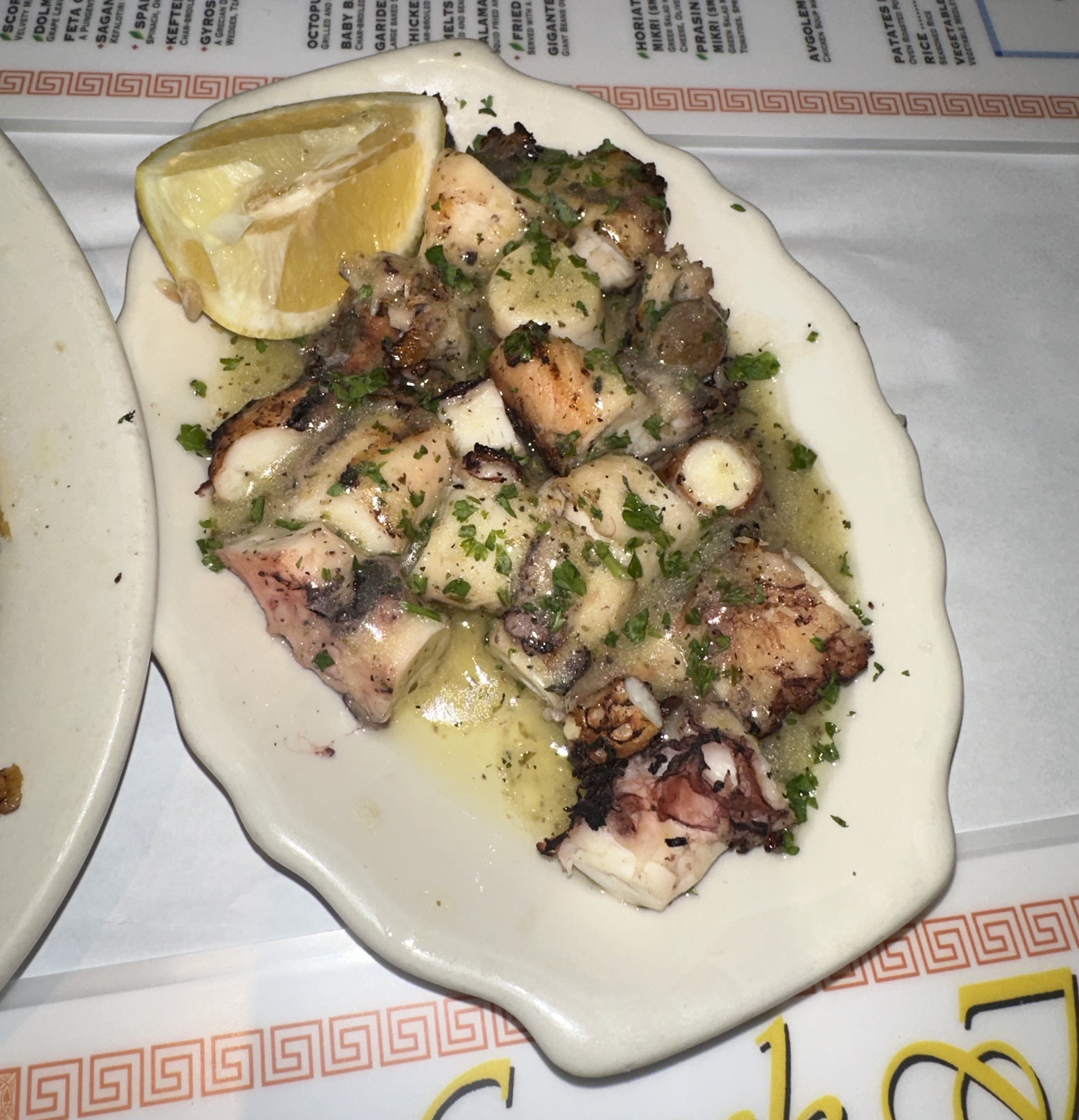
Greek-style grilled octopus with olive oil, lemon, butter and parsley

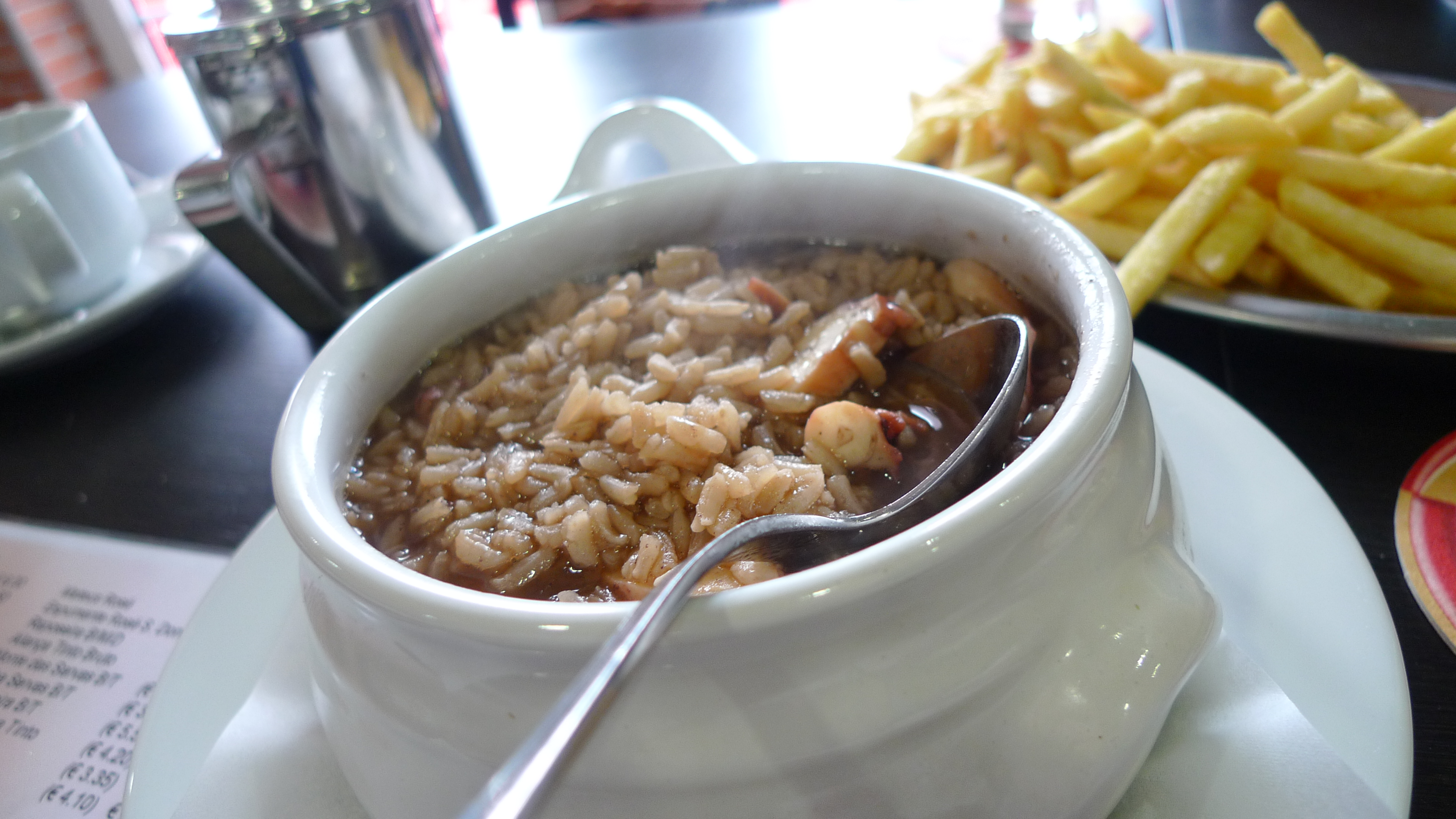
Portuguese octopus and rice stew pot

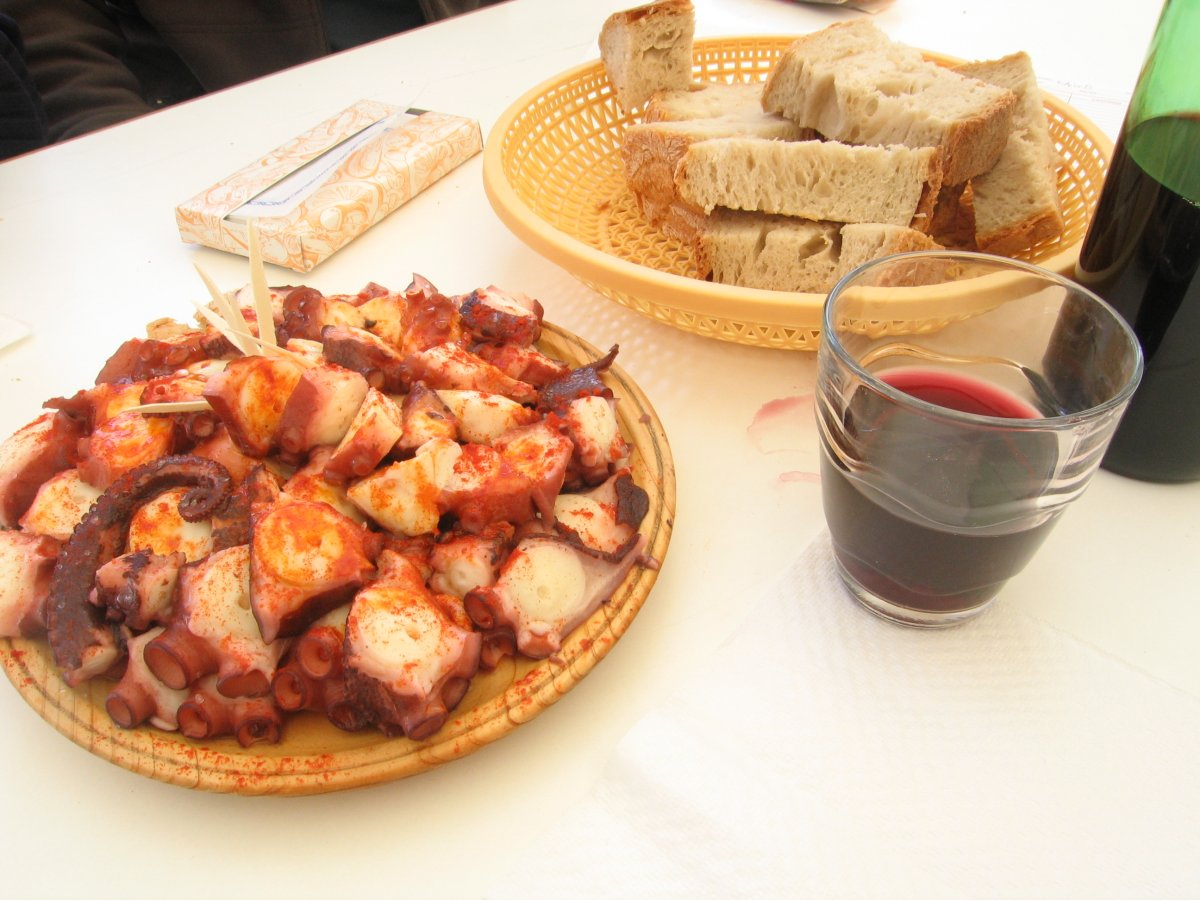
Polbo á feira with bread and wine

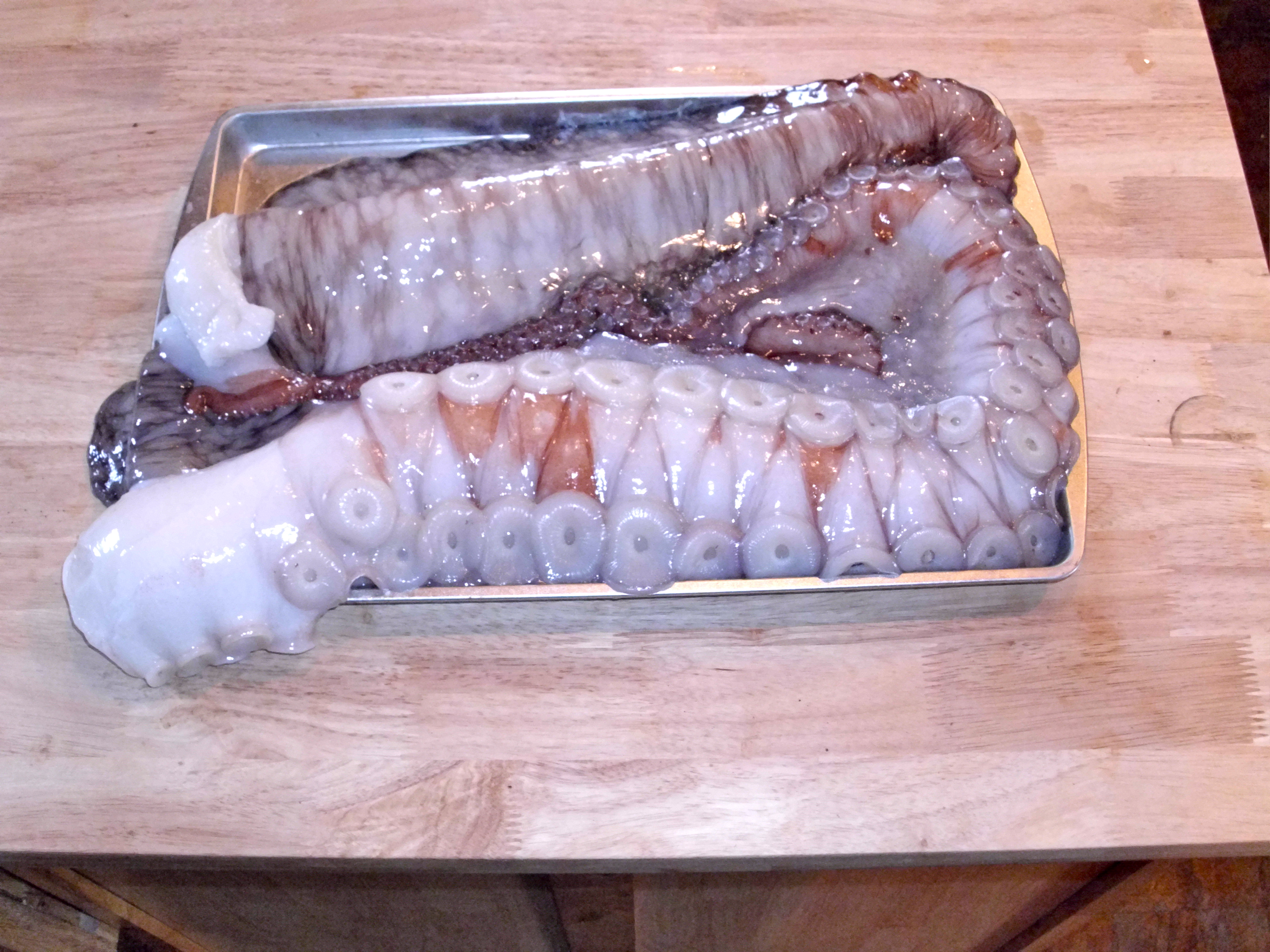
Raw octopus arms

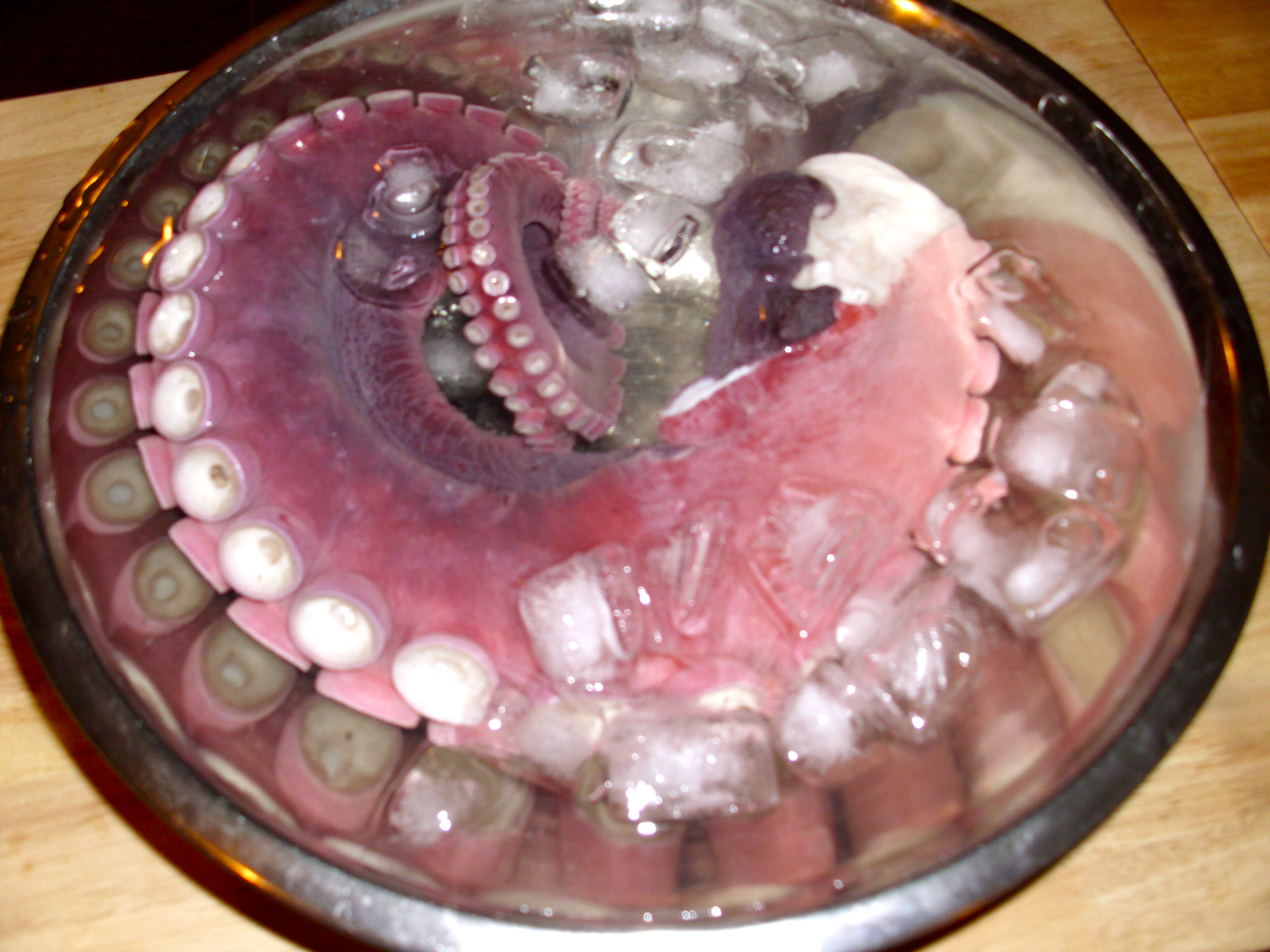
Lightly boiled octopus arm that turned a bright purple

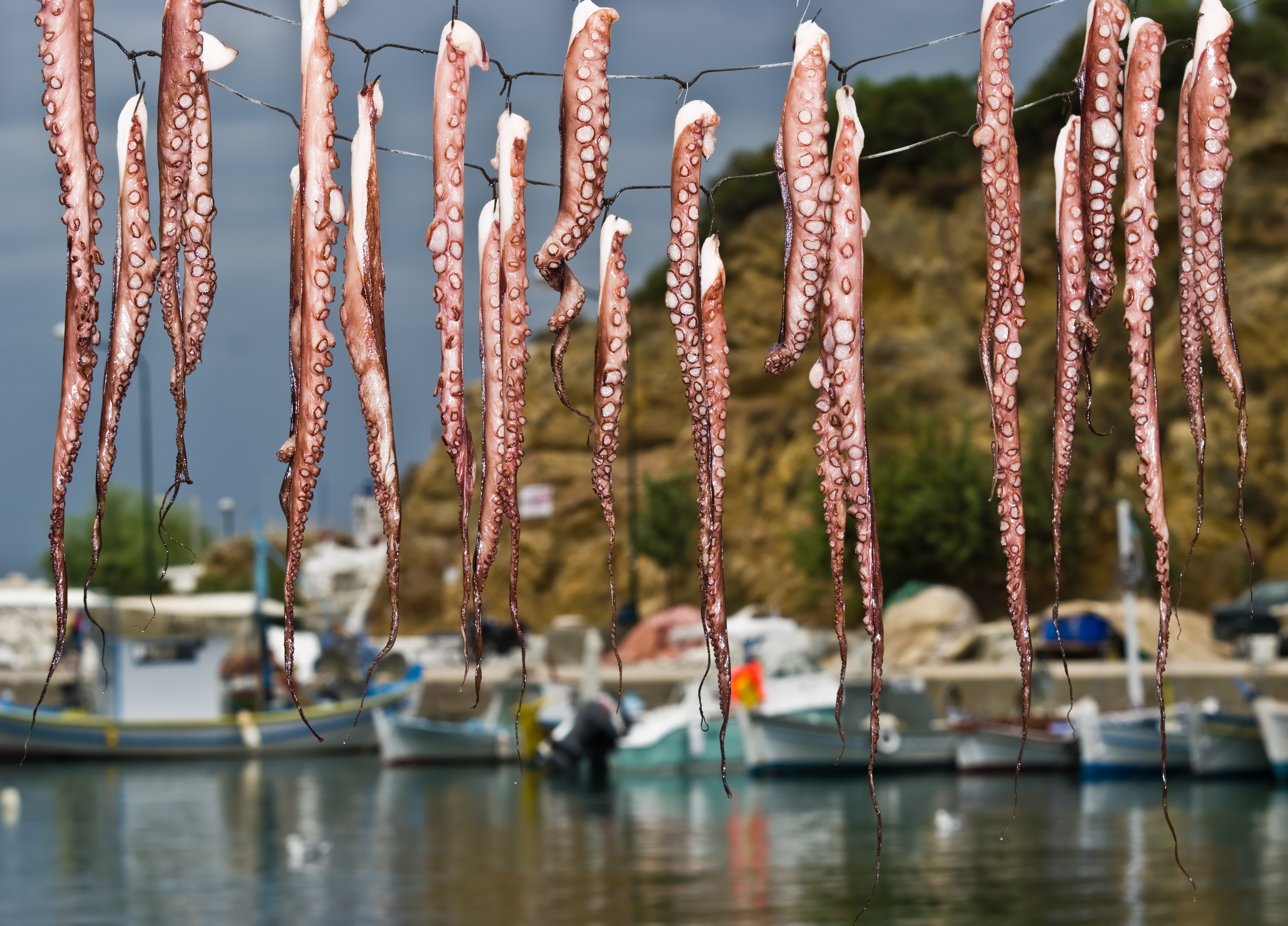
Sun-drying of octopus arms in Turkey

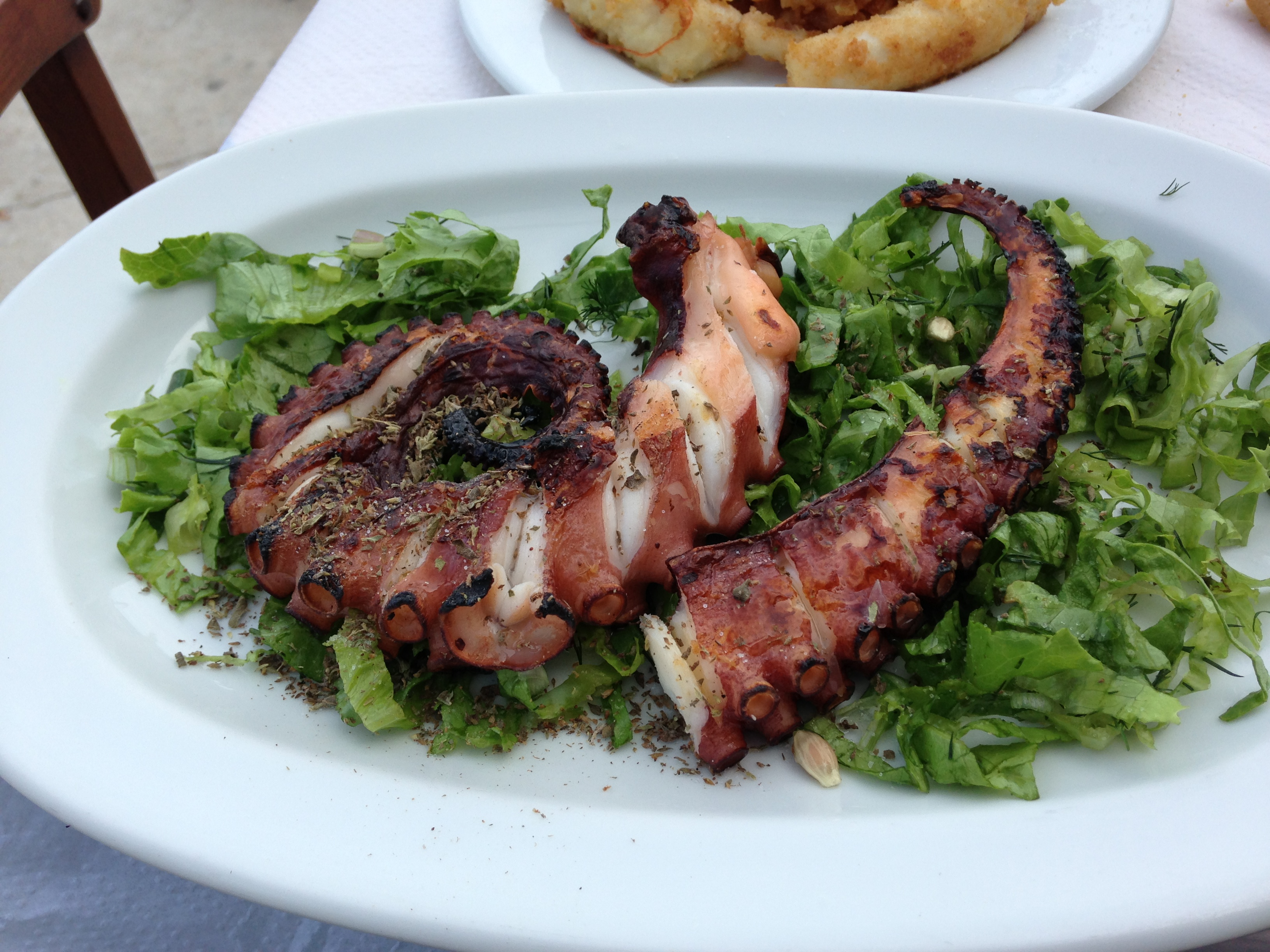
Grilled octopus arm served

== See also ==
- Eating live animals
- Eating live seafood
- List of seafood dishes
- Pain in invertebrates
- Seafood
- Squid as food
- Squid lū'au
