= Takoyaki =

Japanese appetizer

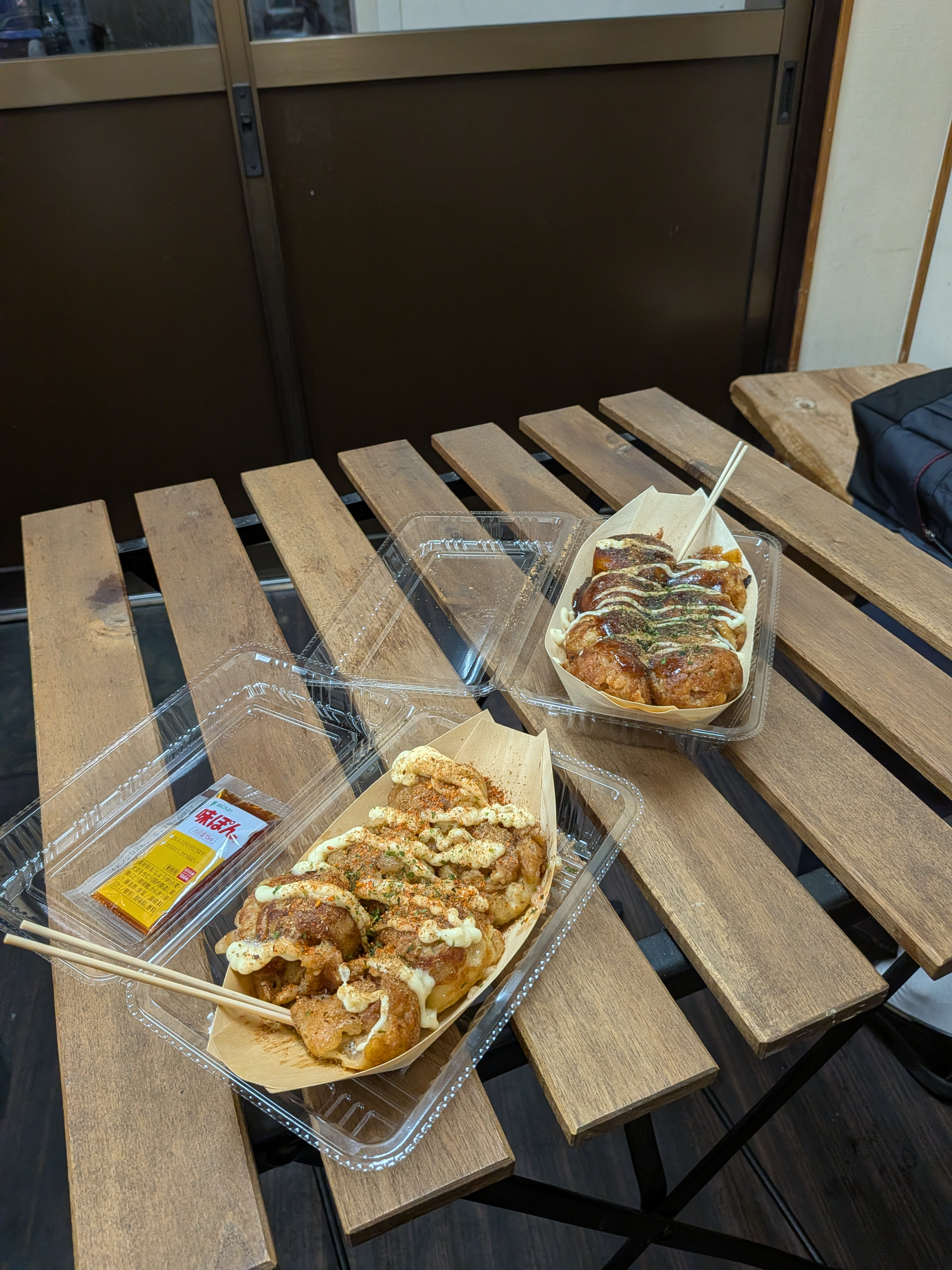
- two boats of takoyaki
- Course: Snack
- Place of origin: Japan
- Region or state: Osaka
- Main ingredients: Batter, octopus, tempura scraps (tenkasu), pickled ginger, green onion, takoyaki sauce (with mayonnaise), green laver (aonori)

Takoyaki being made in Osaka, 2022

Takoyaki (Japanese: たこ焼き or 蛸焼) is a ball-shaped Japanese snack made of a wheat flour–based batter and cooked in a special molded pan. It is typically filled with minced or diced octopus (tako), tempura scraps (tenkasu), pickled ginger (beni shoga), and green onion (negi). The balls are brushed with takoyaki sauce and mayonnaise, and then sprinkled with green laver (aonori) and shavings of dried bonito (katsuobushi).

Yaki (焼き), meaning 'to grill', is one of the cooking methods in Japanese cuisine and can be found in the names of other dishes in Japanese cuisine such as okonomiyaki and ikayaki (other famous Osakan dishes). Typically, it is eaten as a snack or between meals, but in some areas it is served as a side dish with rice. It is an example of konamono (konamon in the Kansai dialect), or flour-based Japanese cuisine.

== History ==
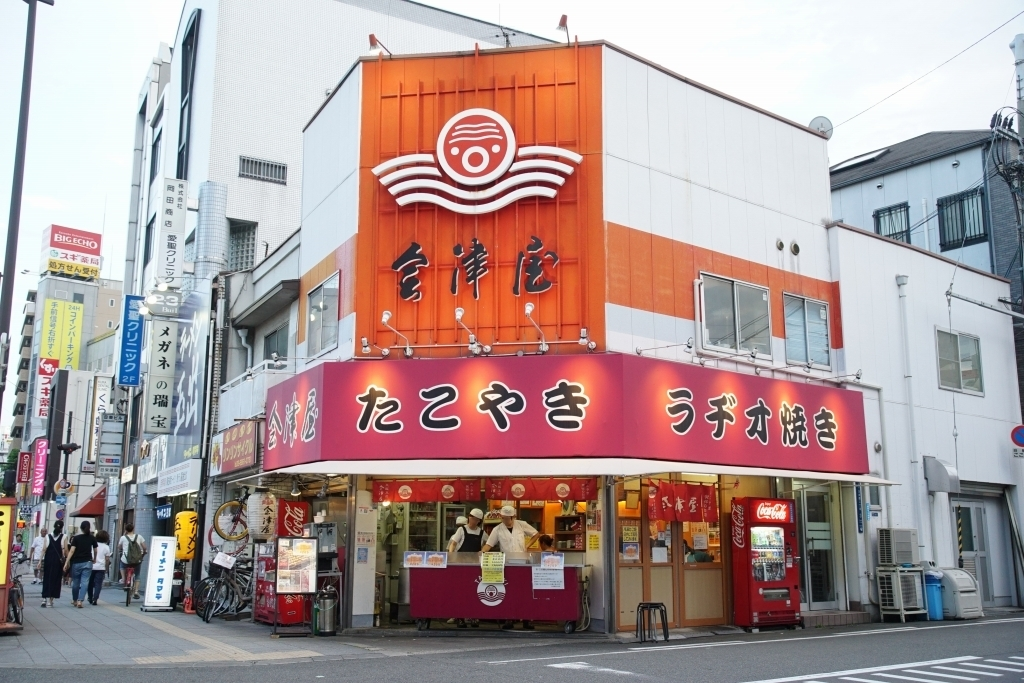
Aizuya Main Branch in Osaka

Takoyaki was first popularized in Osaka, where a street vendor named Tomekichi Endo (遠藤留吉) is credited with its invention in 1935. In the early 20th century, in Osaka, there were snacks called choboyaki (ちょぼ焼き) and radioyaki (ラジオ焼き or ラヂオ焼き, rajioyaki) that contained pieces of beef, konjac or other ingredients. Meanwhile, in Akashi in Hyōgo Prefecture, there was a snack made of an egg-rich batter and octopus, later named akashiyaki (明石焼き). Endo combined them and began selling it under the name takoyaki. It spread throughout Osaka, with various stalls making improvements, and after the Pacific War, the style of eating takoyaki with sauce and mayonnaise was established. Endo's takoyaki shop, named Aizuya after his hometown, still exists today and serves the original takoyaki without sauce or mayonnaise. Today, many shops offer different flavors of takoyaki, including ones filled with cheese or spicy seasonings.

Takoyaki was initially popular in the Kansai region, and later spread to the Kantō region and other areas of Japan. Takoyaki is associated with yatai street food stalls, and there are many well-established takoyaki specialty restaurants, particularly in the Kansai region. Takoyaki is now sold at commercial outlets, such as supermarkets and 24-hour convenience stores.

It is also very popular in Taiwanese cuisine due to the historical influence of Japanese culture. In recent years, takoyaki can be eaten with various toppings and fillings (such as cheese or bacon) as its cultural span has evolved in western parts of the world. The food, known as "octopus balls", quickly became popular throughout Japan.

== Takoyaki pan ==
A takoyaki pan (たこ焼き器, takoyaki-ki) or—much more rarely—takoyaki nabe is typically a griddle made of cast iron with hemispherical molds, similar to a traditional Yorkshire pudding tray. The heavy iron evenly heats the takoyaki, which are turned with a pick during the heating process to pull the uncooked batter to the base of the rounded cavity. Commercial gas-fueled takoyaki cookers are used at Japanese festivals or by street vendors. For home use, electric versions resemble a hotplate; stovetop versions are also available, and many incorporate a non-stick coating to facilitate turning.

== In popular culture ==
Takoyaki is the favorite food of Taruruto, the title character of the 1988 manga series Magical Taruruto. The food plays a major role in several episodes of the anime and a single tie-in film, and also serves as the many collectibles and potential platforms in several tie-in video games.

A children's book named Takoyaki Mantoman, published in the 1990s and later adapted into an anime television series produced by Studio Pierrot that aired from April 1998 to September 1999, focuses on a group of takoyaki fighting crime.

== Image gallery ==
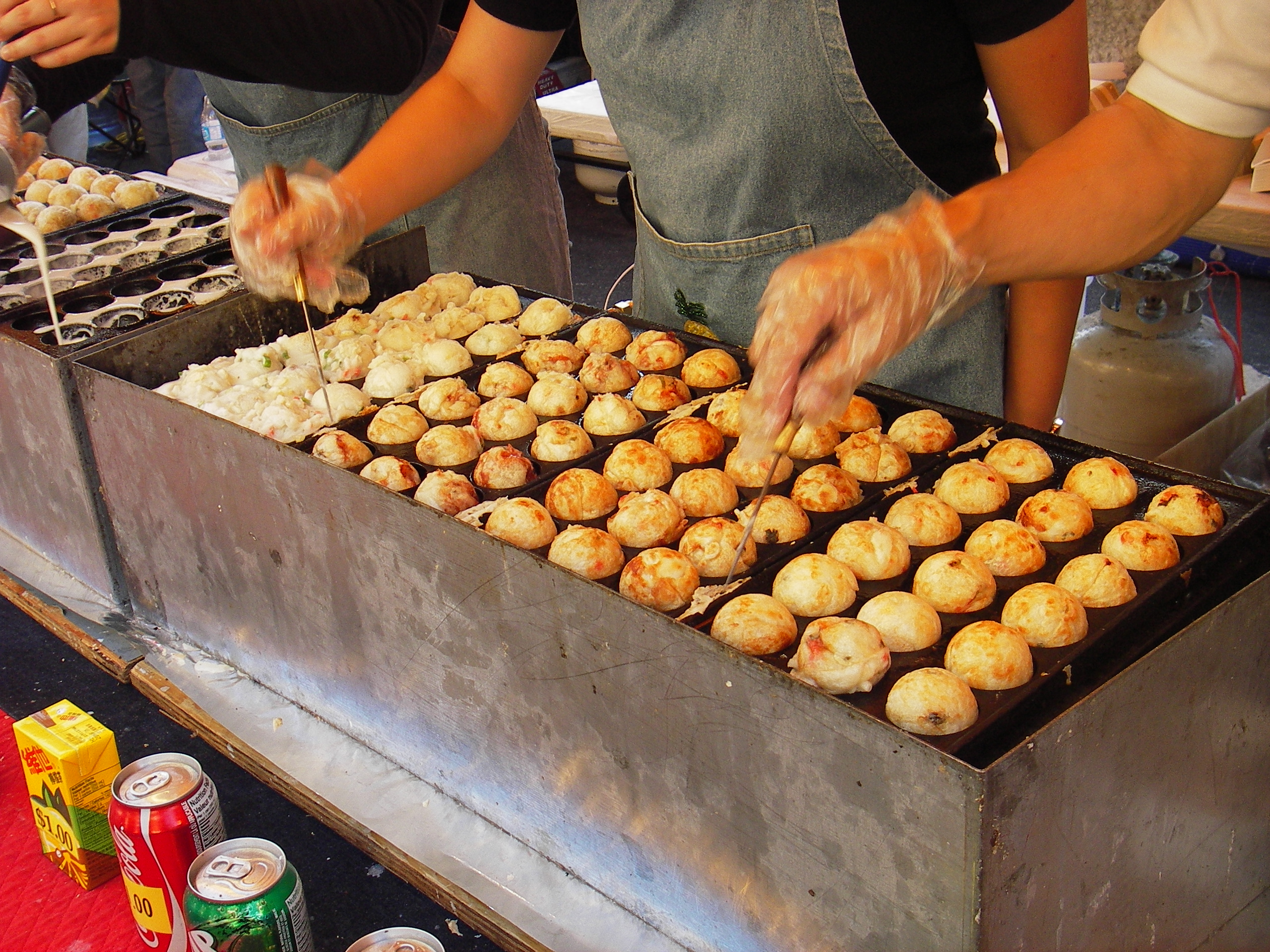
Cooking takoyaki

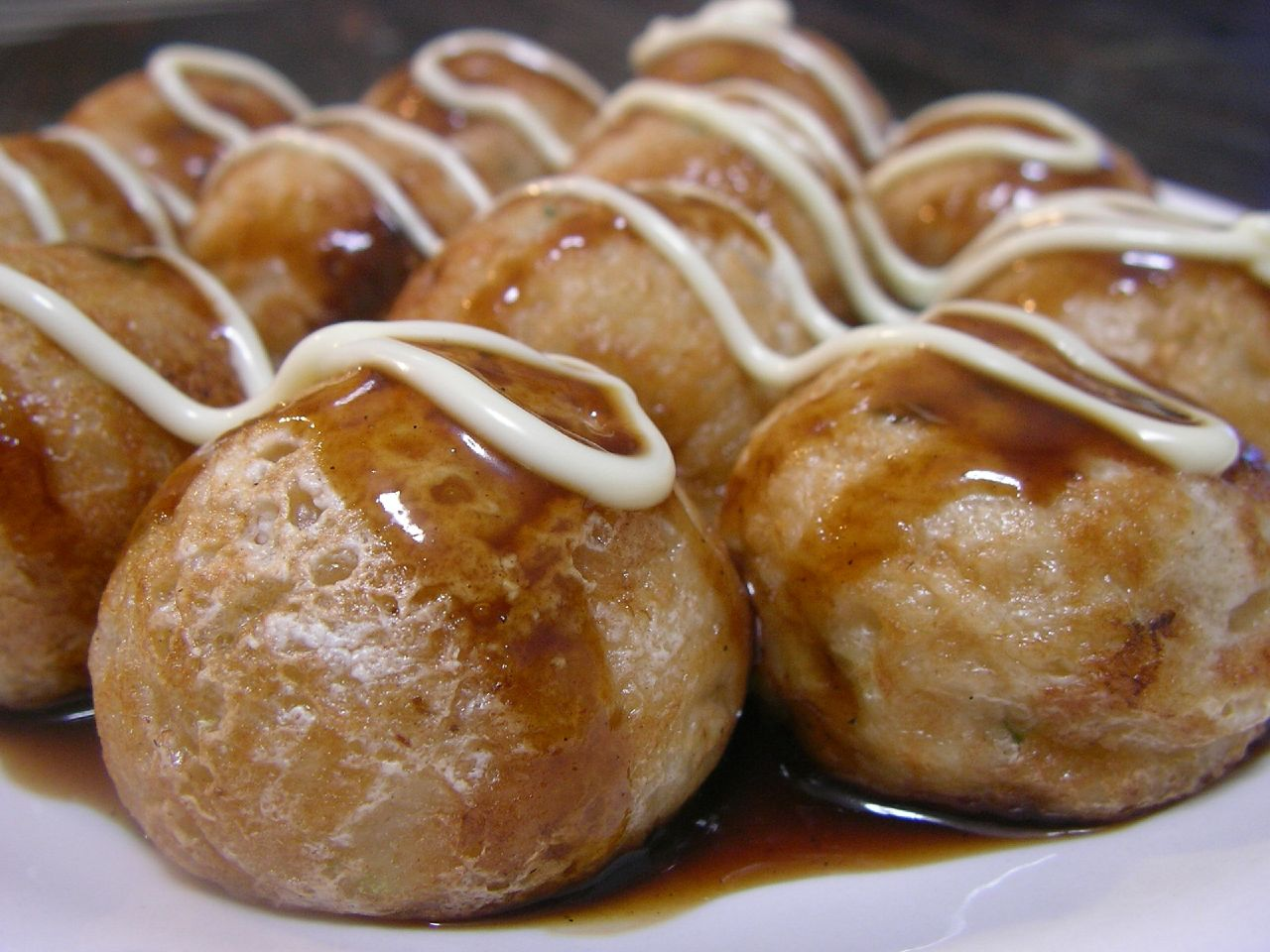
Takoyaki served with Japanese Worcester sauce and mayonnaise

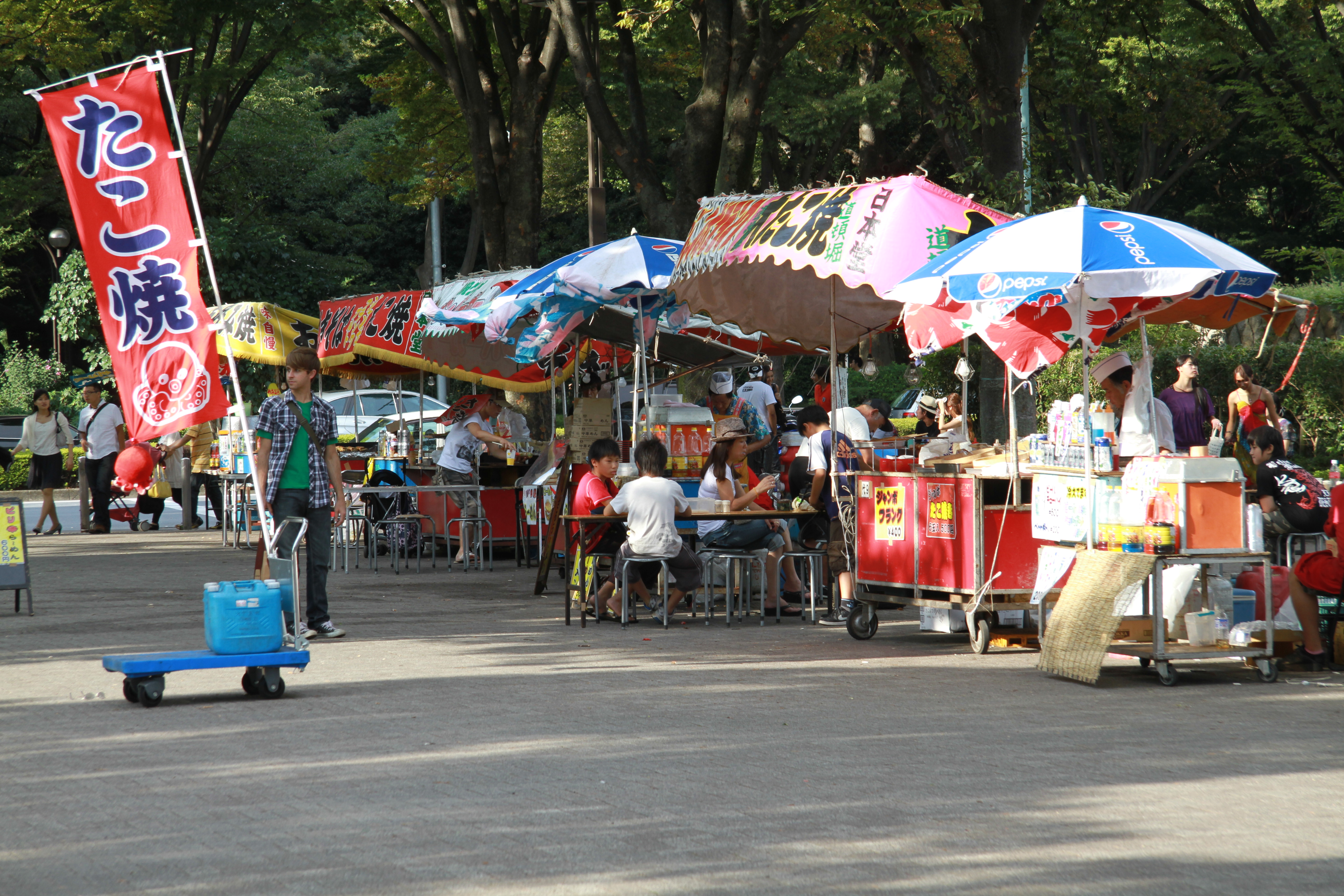
A takoyaki yatai in Yoyogi Park, Tokyo

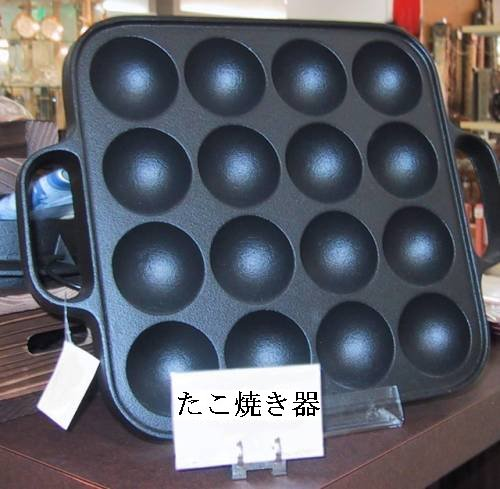
Square takoyaki pan with 16 molds

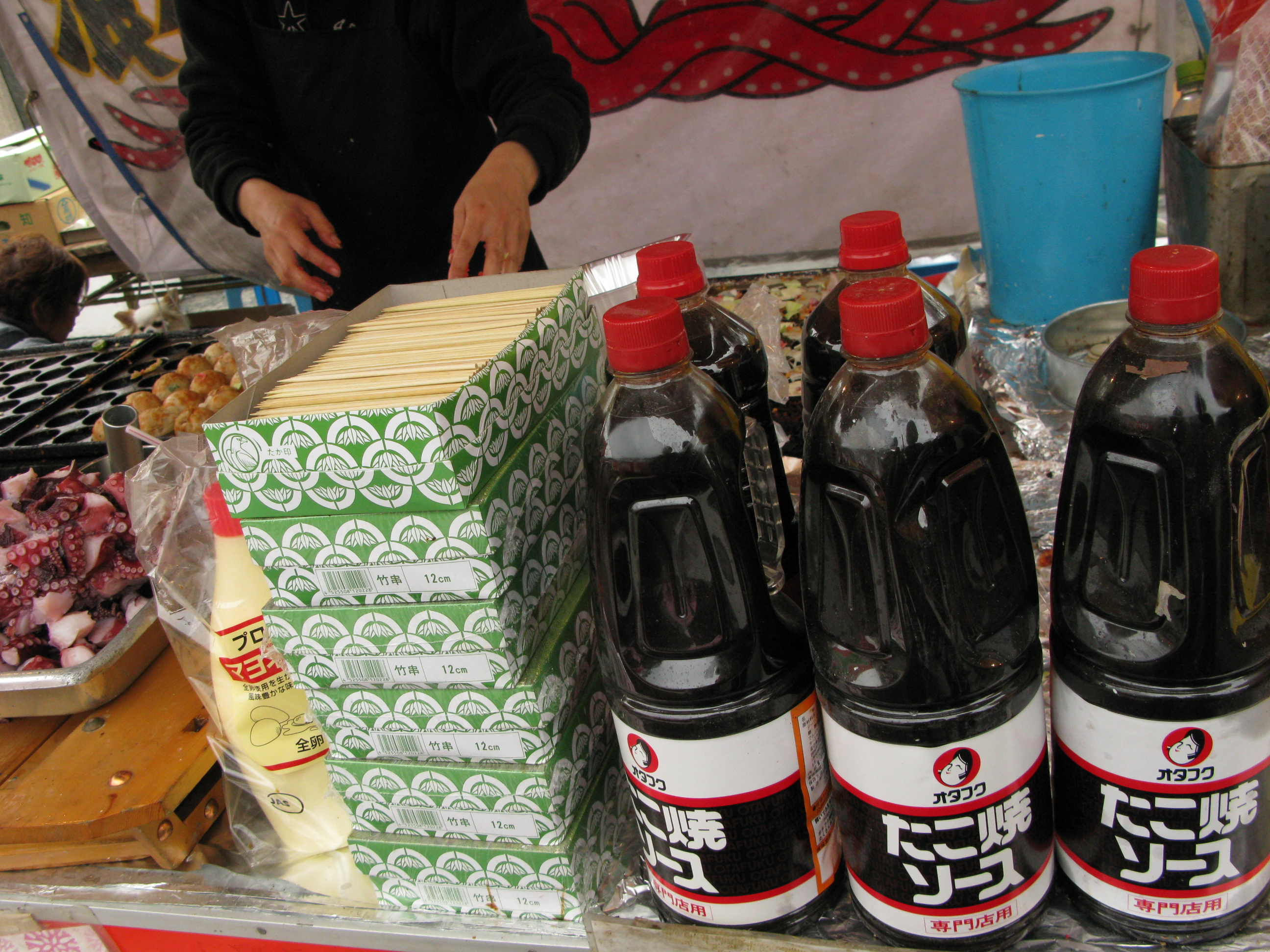
Takoyaki sauce on a street vendor's stall in Ueno Park, Tokyo

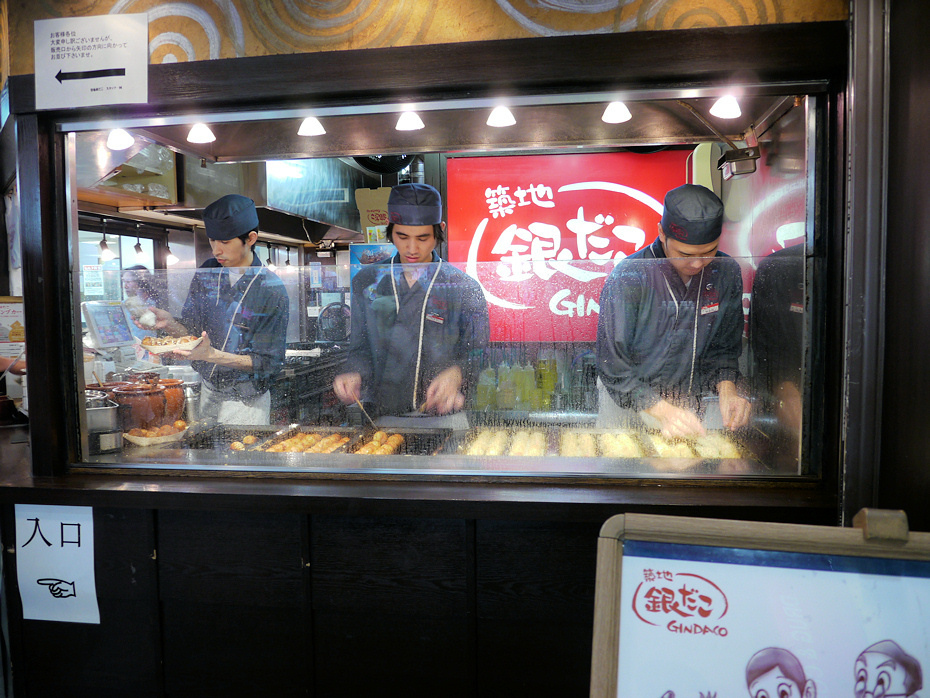
Open kitchen store

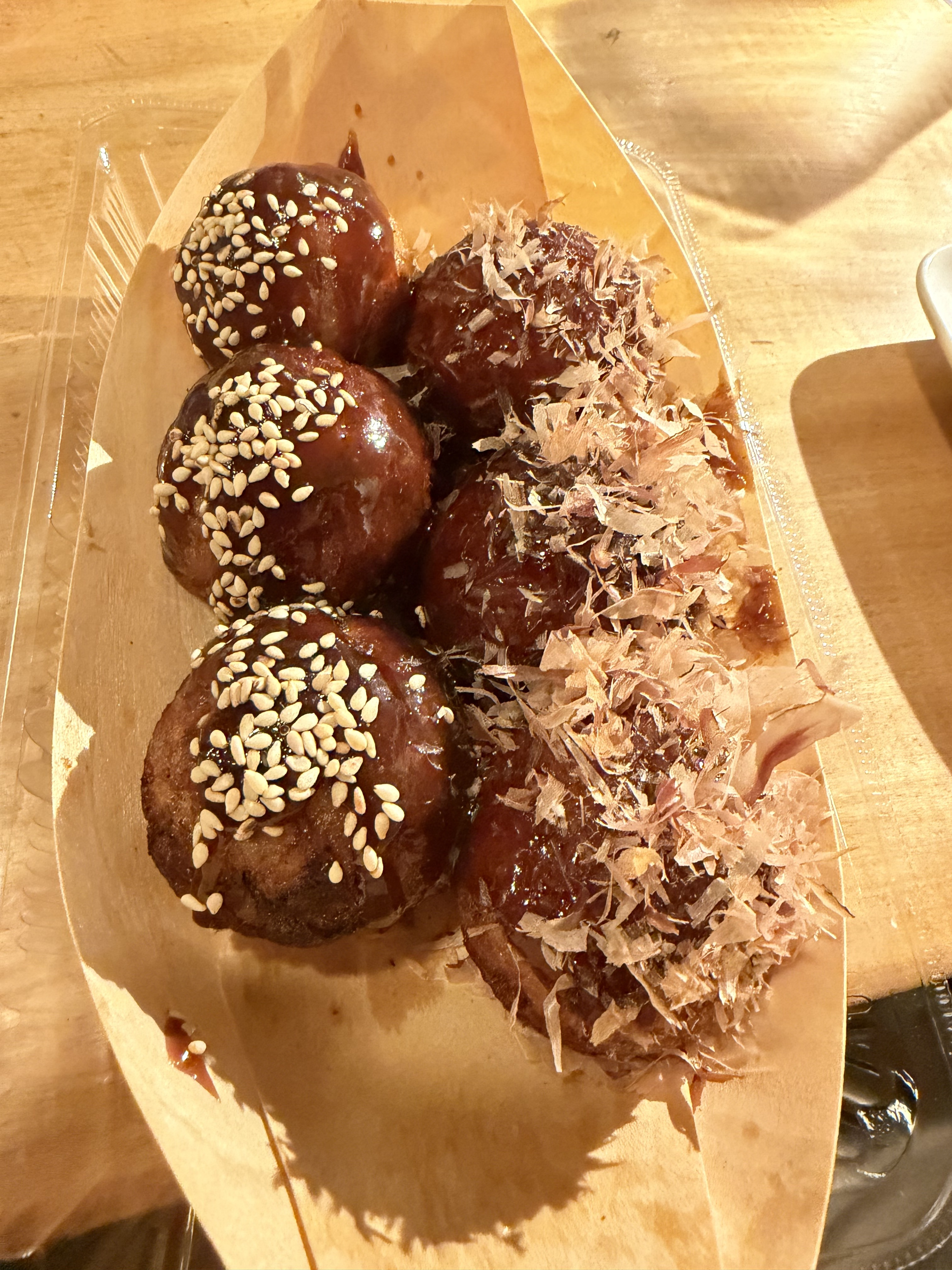
Osaka-style and Kyoto-style Takoyaki made in Kyoto, Japan

== See also ==
- List of seafood dishes
- Æbleskiver
- Akashiyaki
- Poffertjes
