= Moti pak =

Indian dessert

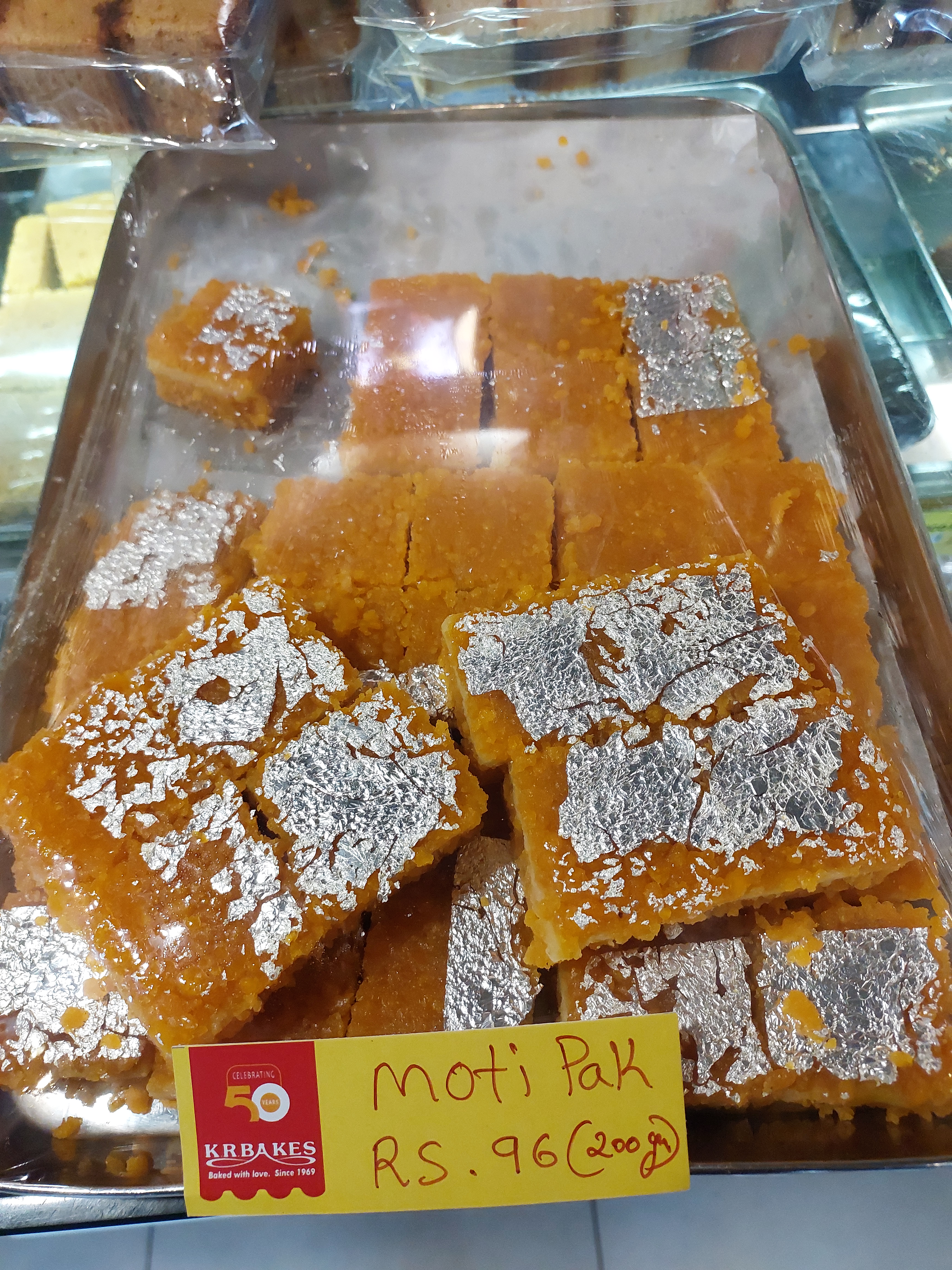
- Moti pak
- Course: Dessert
- Place of origin: India
- Region or state: Gujarat, Rajasthan
- Main ingredients: Gram flour, khoa, sugar, ghee

Moti pak is an Indian sweet made from gram flour and sweetened khoa (reduced milk). It is a popular dessert that is found across various regions of India. It is originated from the states of Gujarat and Rajasthan.

== Preparation ==
To prepare Moti Pak, a thin batter is made using gram flour, with a pinch of food colour added. A slotted ladle is used to pour drops of the batter into hot oil to form boondi. The fried boondi is then soaked in sugar syrup and mixed with khoa (reduced milk). The mixture is spread on a tray greased with ghee and allowed to cool. Once set, it is cut into squares and garnished with chopped nuts.
