= Ikayaki =

Japanese grilled squid

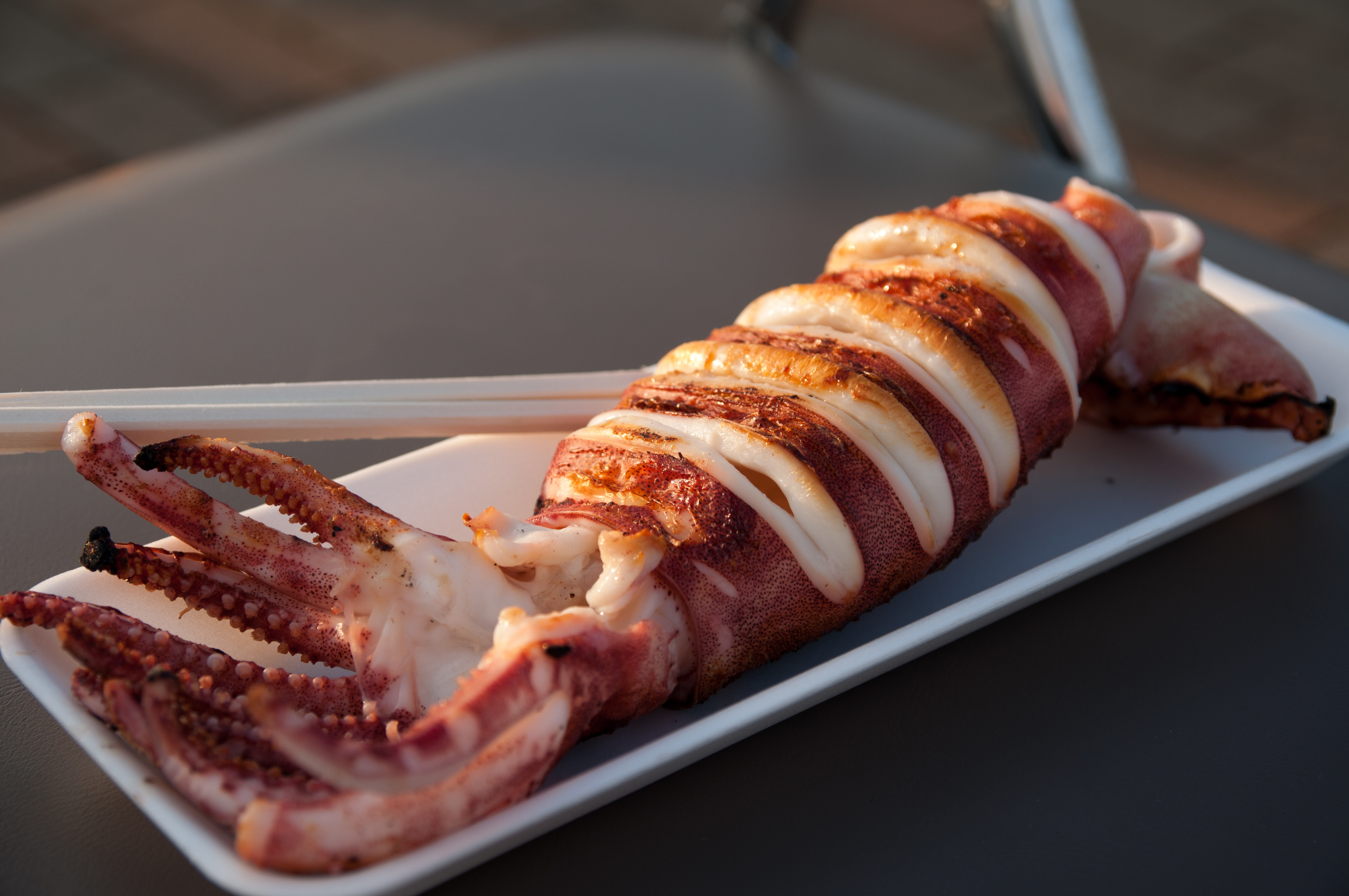
Ikayaki, or grilled squid

Ikayaki (いか焼き, イカ焼き, or 烏賊焼) is a popular fast food in Japan. In much of Japan, the term refers to simple grilled squid topped with soy sauce; the portion of squid served may be the whole body (minus entrails), rings cut from the body, or one or more tentacles, depending on the size. Ikayaki is served in many izakayas and a grilled tentacle on a stick is popular at Japanese festivals.

== Osaka variety ==
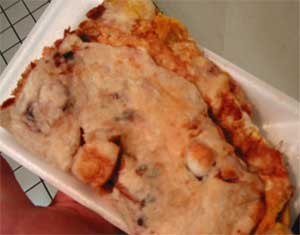
Crêpe-like ikayaki from Osaka

The term "ikayaki" may refer to a style of "squid pancake" that is a regional specialty in Osaka. This pancake style is prepared like folded crêpes and made of chopped squid, hard dough, Worcestershire sauce, and sometimes egg, and is cooked and pressed between two iron plates. The popularity of this style of "ikayaki" is partly due to its speed, as it only takes a minute to cook it this way.

The Snack Park of Hanshin Department Store (Umeda, Osaka) is famous for its ikayaki. Ikayaki is also commonly served on the street or at the beach.

It should not be confused with takoyaki, which are spherical octopus dumplings also from Osaka.

== Gallery ==
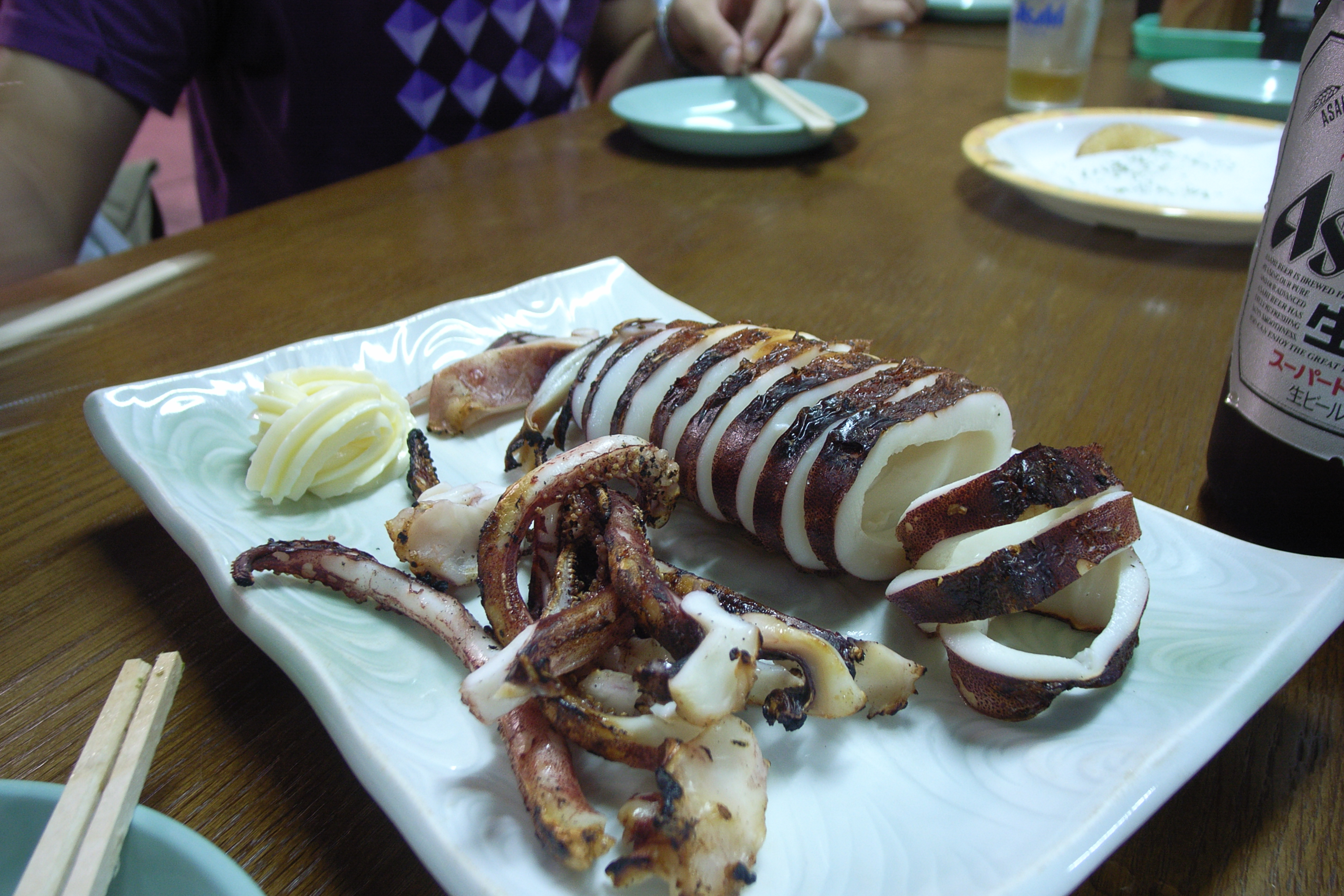
Ikayaki served in an izakaya

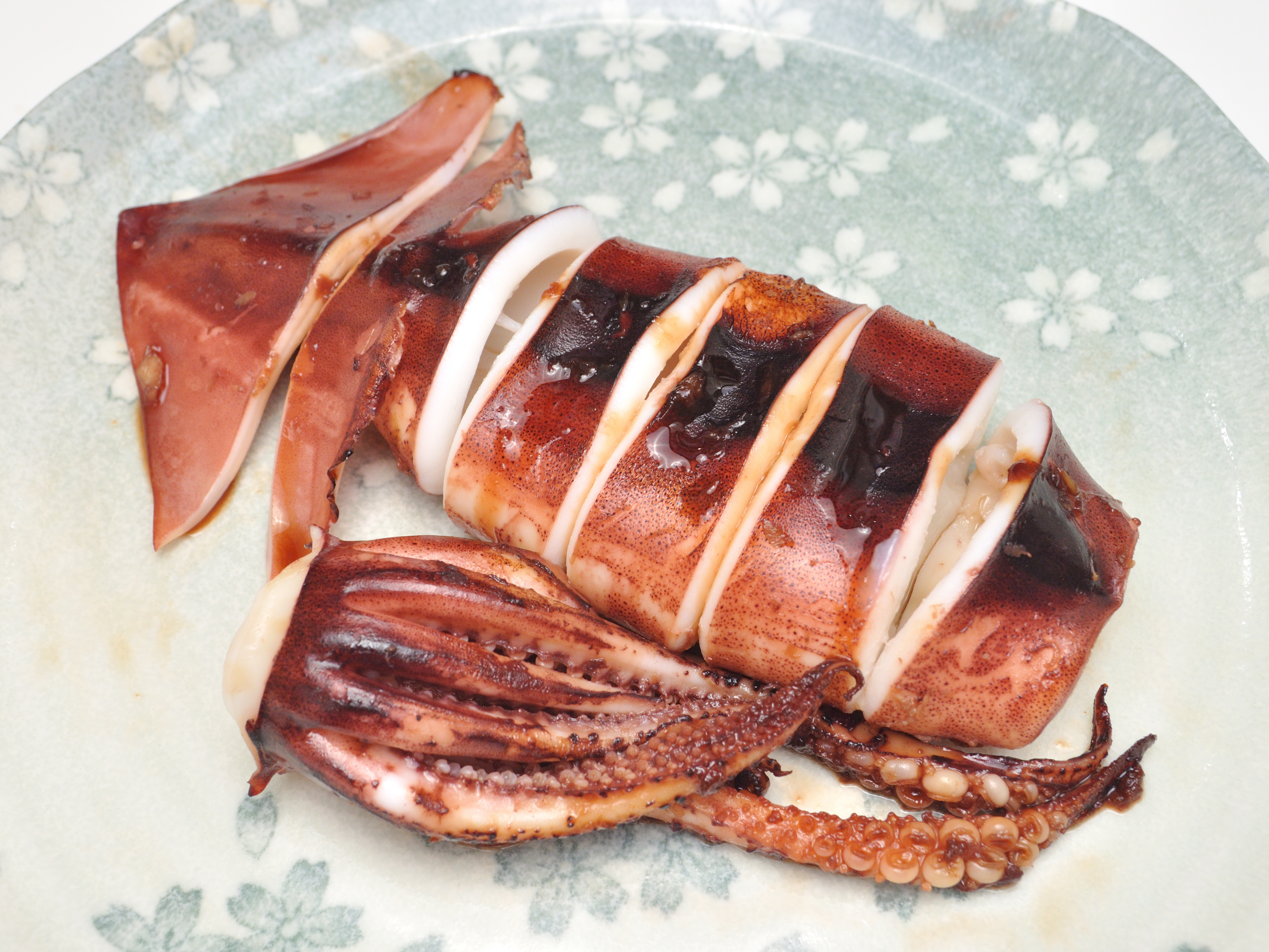

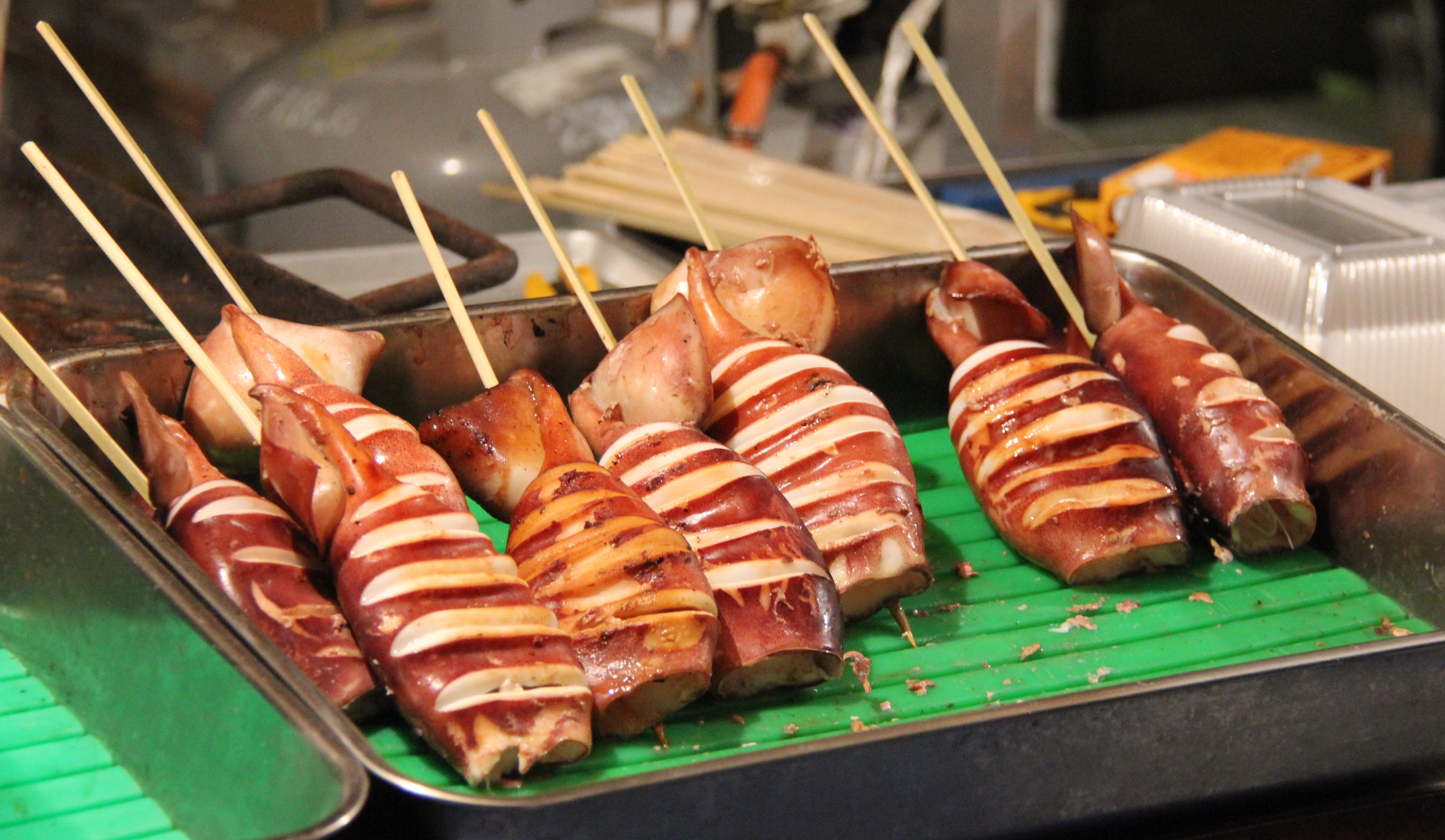

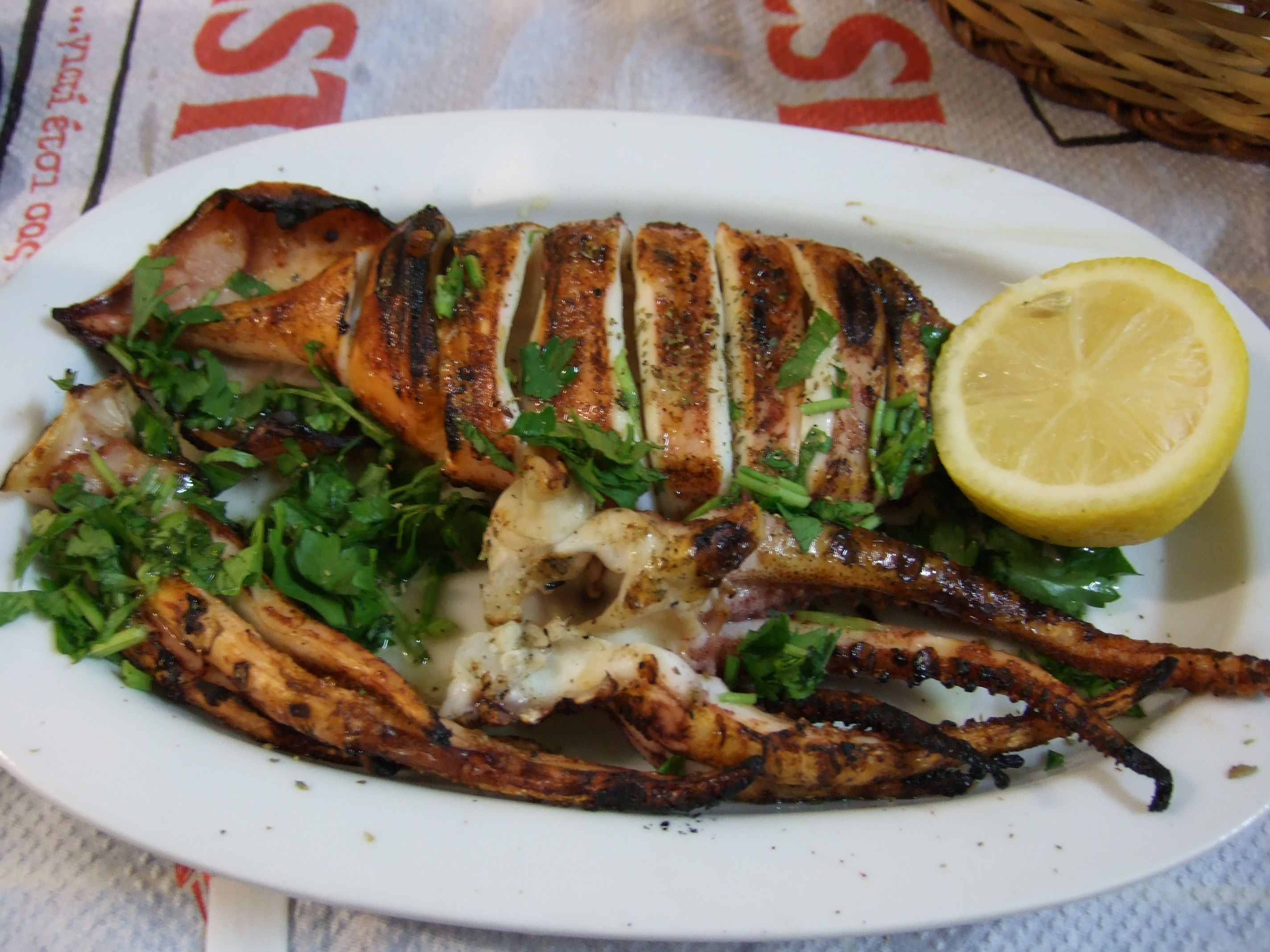

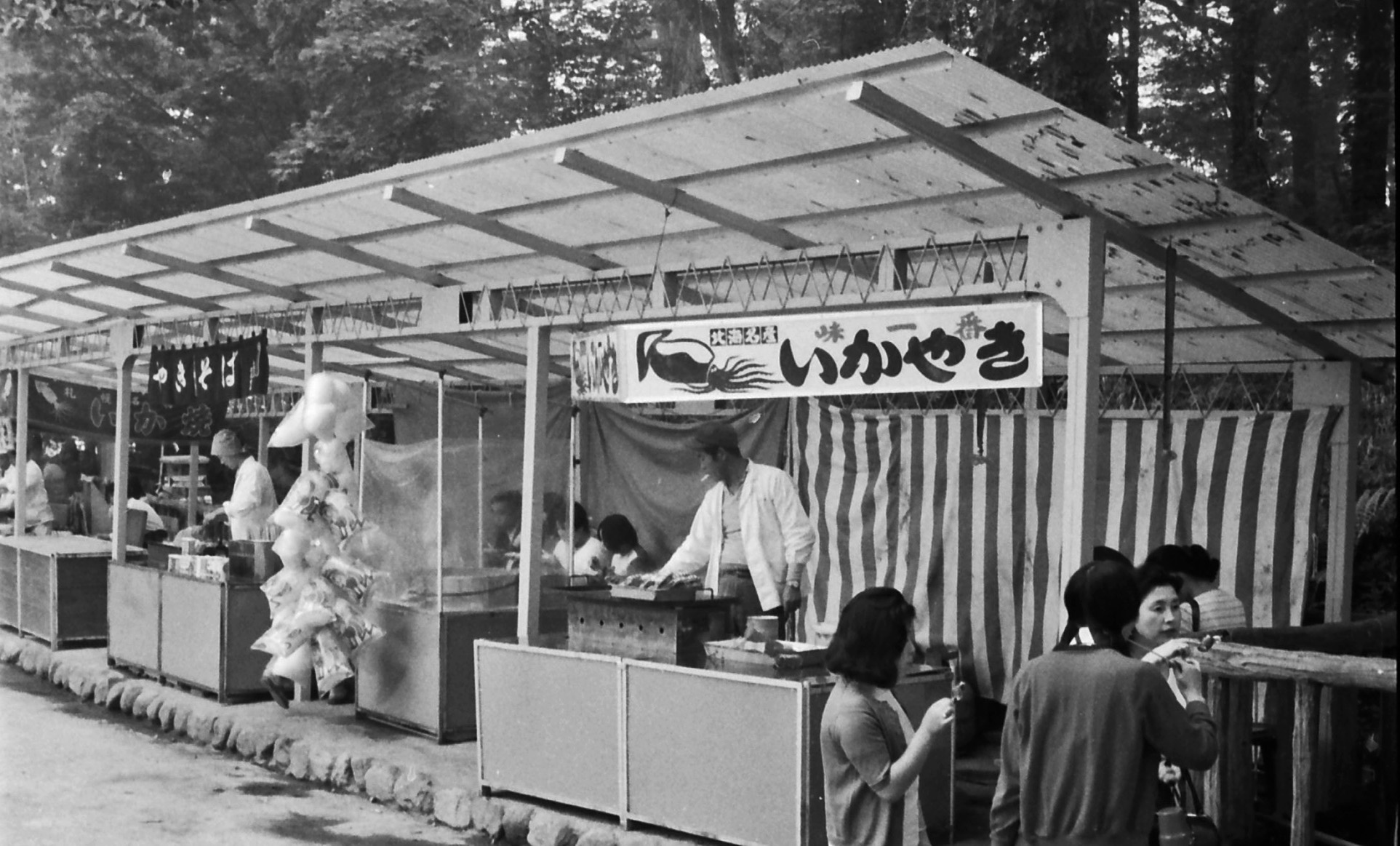
Ikayaki stall in Nikkō city, 1971
