= Miruhulee boava =

Maldivian delicacy

- Type: Curry
- Place of origin: Maldives
- Main ingredients: Octopus tentacles, curry leaves, chili, garlic, cloves, onions, pepper, coconut oil

Miruhulee boava is a Maldivian delicacy made of octopus tentacles braised in curry leaves, chili, garlic, cloves, onion, pepper, and coconut oil.

== See also ==
- List of seafood dishes
