= Jean-Baptiste Fonssagrives =

French naval physician and hygienist (1823–1884)

- Born: March 12, 1823; Limoges, France
- Died: November 21, 1884 (aged 61); Crac'h, Morbihan, France
- Occupations: Naval physician, professor of hygiene
- Employer: University of Montpellier School of Medicine
- Awards: Legion of Honour

Jean-Baptiste Fonssagrives (12 March 1823 – 21 November 1884) was a French naval physician, hygienist, and medical author. He served in the French Navy medical corps before becoming a professor of hygiene at the University of Montpellier, and was a leading figure in 19th-century naval and public hygiene.

== Early life and naval career ==
Fonssagrives was born in Limoges to a civil servant family. He entered the French naval medical service in 1841 and was trained at Rochefort. During the 1840s and early 1850s, he served aboard several naval vessels in the Mediterranean and along the West African coast, later holding senior medical posts in Brest and Cherbourg.

He rose steadily through the naval medical ranks, ultimately becoming a senior naval physician and director of medical services for the French naval forces on the West African station.

== Academic career ==
In 1852, Fonssagrives became a professor at the Brest School of Medicine, where he earned his doctorate in medicine. In 1864 he was promoted to chief physician, and shortly thereafter appointed professor of hygiene at the University of Montpellier School of Medicine. He retired from active service in 1866.

His Traité d’hygiène navale (1856) was widely regarded as an authoritative work on naval hygiene and maritime medicine for several decades.

== Medical thought and writings ==
Fonssagrives was a prolific author whose work focused on hygiene, preventive medicine, nutrition, pediatrics, and public health. His publications were widely read by both physicians and educated lay audiences and contributed to the popularization of hygienic principles in 19th-century France.

== Personal life and legacy ==
Fonssagrives was the father of Jean-Baptiste Fonssagrives (1862–1910), a French colonial administrator who served as governor of French Dahomey. He was the great-grandfather of the French fashion photographer Fernand Fonssagrives.

== Selected works ==
- Traité d’hygiène navale (1856)
- Hygiène alimentaire des malades (1861)
- Entretiens familiers sur l’hygiène (1867)
- L’éducation physique des jeunes filles (1869)
- Hygiène et assainissement des villes (1871)
- Principes de thérapeutique générale (1875)

== Honors ==
- Legion of Honour: Knight (1857), Officer (1862)
