= Tenkasu =

Crunchy bits of deep-fried flour batter used in Japanese cuisine

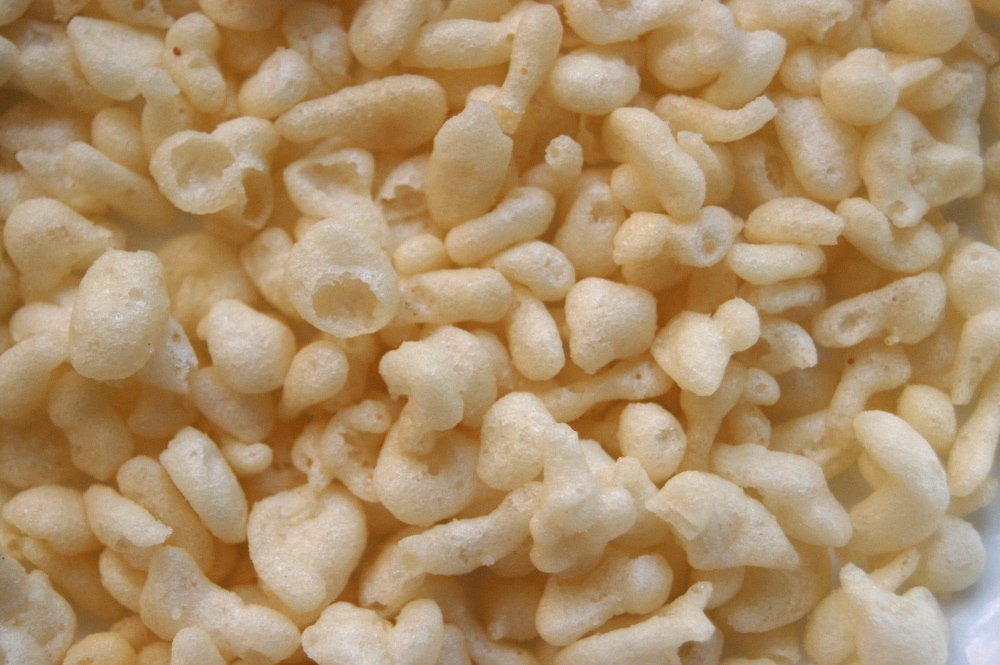
- Close-up of tenkasu
- Place of origin: Japan
- Main ingredients: Batter

A bowl of Tanuki-soba

Tenkasu (天かす; lit. 'tempura waste') are crunchy bits of deep-fried flour batter used in Japanese cuisine, specifically in dishes such as soba, udon, takoyaki, and okonomiyaki. Hot, plain soba and udon with added tenkasu are called tanuki-soba and tanuki-udon, respectively (haikara-soba and haikara-udon in the Kansai region).

They are also called agedama (揚げ玉; literally "fried ball"). According to the NHK Broadcasting Culture Research Institute, 68% of Japanese people called them tenkasu and 29% agedama in 2003. Tenkasu is more common in western Japan and agedama in the east.

== See also ==
- Scraps (batter)
- Youtiao
- Cak-Cak
- Fried dough
- Fried dough foods
- Boondi
