= Boondi =

Indian snack made from fried chickpea flour

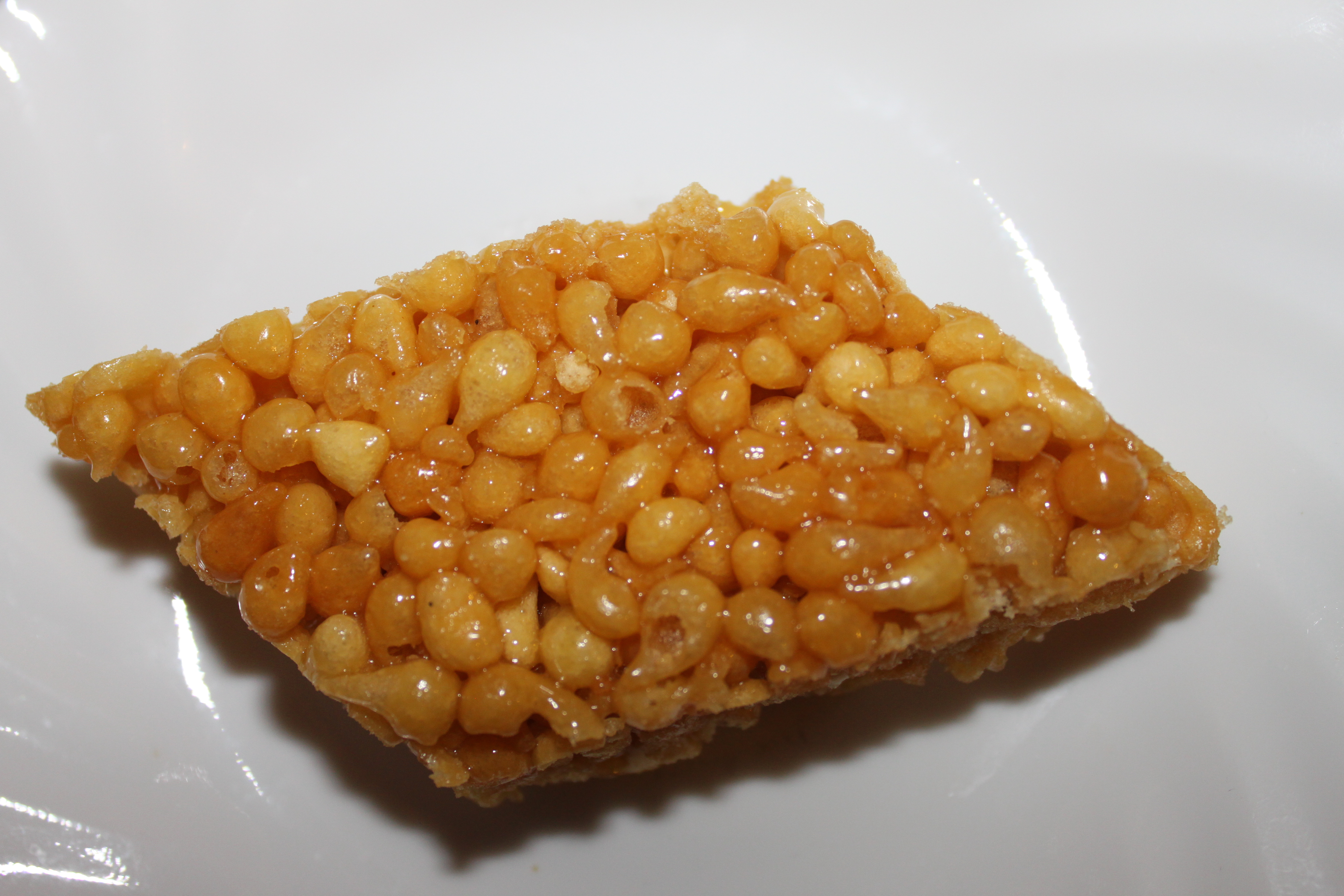
- Boondi Mithai
- Alternative names: Bundi, Bundiya, Buniya, Bonde, Nukti, Boondia, Bundia
- Course: Dessert
- Place of origin: Indian subcontinent
- Region or state: Bangladesh; India (Andhra Pradesh, Bihar, Gujarat, Haryana, Maharashtra, Karnataka, Odisha, Kerala, Punjab, Rajasthan, Sindh, Uttar Pradesh, West Bengal, Tamil Nadu)
- Main ingredients: Gram flour, sugar
- Variations: Khara or Kara boondi

Boondi, bundi, boondia or bundia is an Indian dessert made from fried chickpea flour. It is either eaten as a savoury snack or sweetened as a dessert.

In Sindh and Rajasthan, the dish is called nukti (Sindhi: نڪتي, Dhatki: نڪتي | नुक्ती). In Nepali, Bhojpuri region and Bihar it is referred to as buniya/bundiya (बुनिया/बुंदिया). In Bengal, it is called boorinda, bonde or bundiya (বুরিন্দা/বোঁদে/বুন্দিয়া).

== Preparation ==
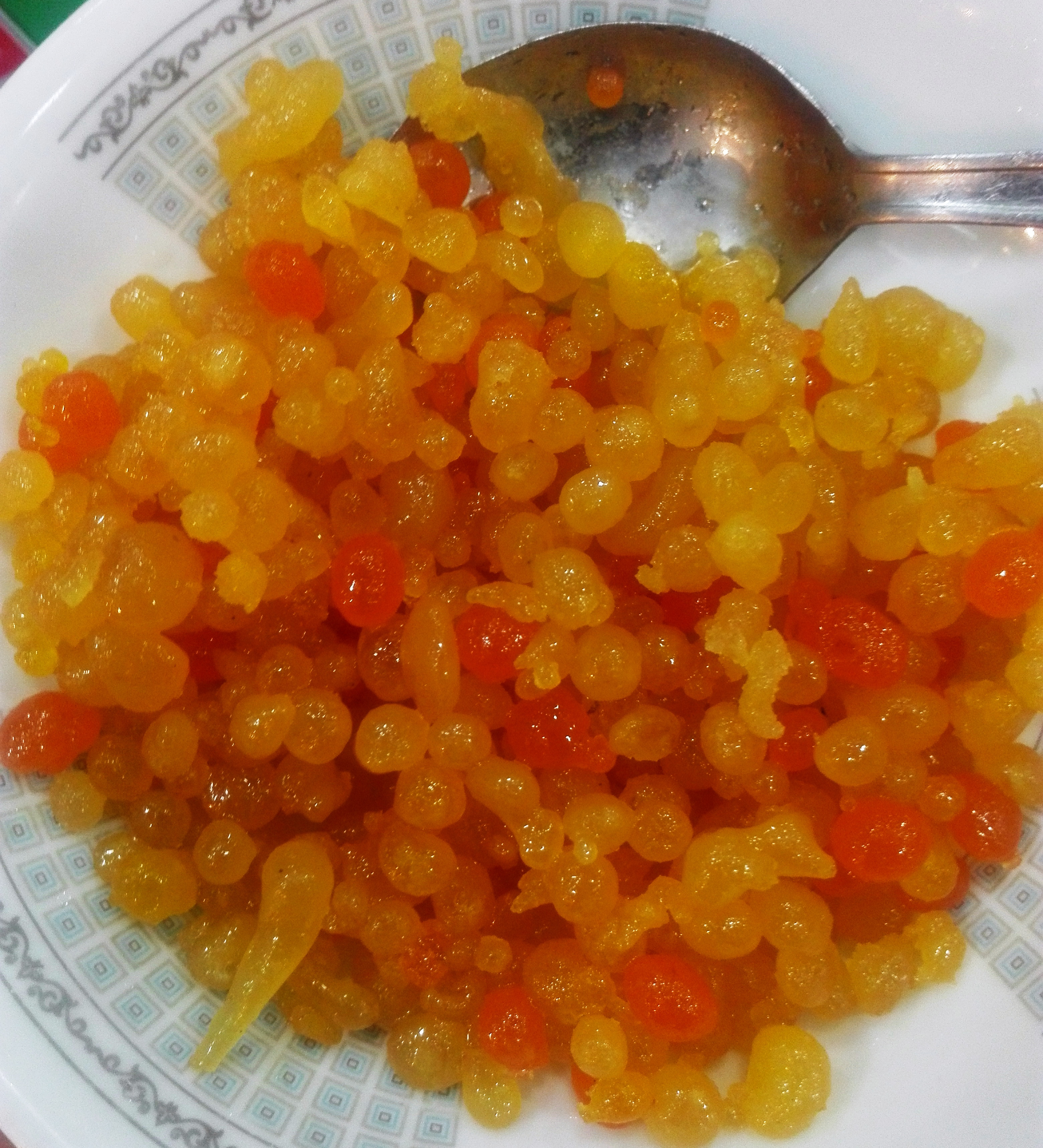
Sweetened boondi

To make sweetened boondi, chickpea flour, baking powder, and food colouring are mixed into a batter. A slotted spoon is used to pour small drops into a deep frying pan. The boondi is then soaked in sugar syrup.

== Variations ==
- Boondi is used to prepare raita in North India. Boondi raita typically contains curd (plain yoghurt), boondi (which has been soaked in water to make it soft, then sieved) and seasonings of salt, chilli, and other spices. It is eaten as a side dish with pulao or any other meal.

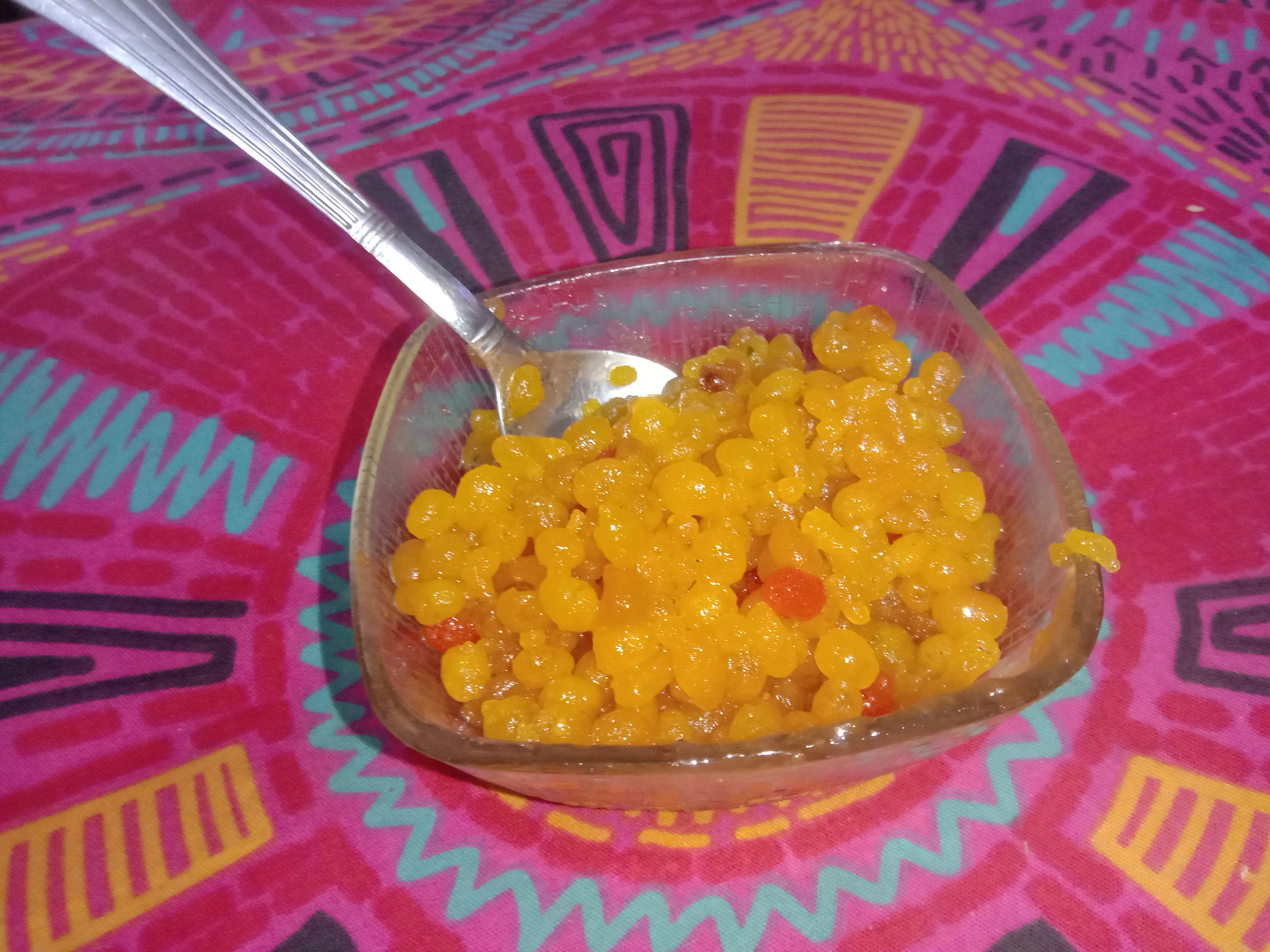
Homemade Boondi from West Bengal

- To make boondi laddu, fried boondi is dipped in sugar syrup and compacted into a ball. It can be garnished with nuts and raisins.
- Khara or kara boondi (spicy savory boondi) is made by adding chili powder, salt, turmeric powder to the boondi batter and deep fried in oil. Khara or kara boondi is eaten by itself or added to Bombay mix. Crushed curry leaves, roasted peanuts, roasted cashew are added.
- In West Bengal, Sada Bonde from Kamarpukur was awarded a Certificate of Registration of Geographical Indication in 2025. This variant is made using the milk product chhena, sugar and ghee.

== See also ==
- Moti pak
