= SingTel Hawker Heroes Challenge =

The SingTel Hawker Heroes Challenge was organised by SingTel and was held on 7 July 2013 at the Newton Food Centre. Live streaming of the challenge was broadcast by Singtel on its HungryGoWhere portal, as well as the announcement of results on Mio TV. The challenge involved popular television personality and UK chef, Gordon Ramsay, pitting his skills against a group of chosen food hawkers in Singapore.

== Voting ==
On 5 June 2013, Singaporean food bloggers and Singtel submitted a challenge to Gordon Ramsay to compete in a cook-off with top hawkers in Singapore. Ramsay accepted the challenge on 24 June.

Voting began on 25 June with 12 food hawkers selected around Singapore.

The top 3 winning hawkers were then chosen on 3 July to compete against Ramsay in the final showdown.

Votes for top 12 food hawkers
Position	Food	Shop	Total votes
1	Chilli Crab	Jumbo Seafood Restaurant	319,922
2	Chicken Rice	Tian Tian Hainanese Chicken Rice	318,151
3	Laksa	328 Katong Laksa	316,611
4	Carrot Cake	Hai Sheng Carrot Cake	289,365
5	Char Kway Teow	Hill Street Fried Kway Teow	199,828
6	Nasi Lemak	Selera Rasa Nasi Lemak	177,795
7	Prata Murtabak	Sin Ming Roti Prata	171,240
8	Claypot Chicken Rice	New Lucky Claypot Chicken Rice	165,515
9	Roast Meat	Kay Lee Roast Meat Joint	156,389
10	Prawn Noodles	Noo Cheng Adam Road Big Prawn Mee	135,527
11	Hokkien Mee	Eng Ho Fried Hokkien Prawn Mee	131,688
12	Bak Kut Teh	Outram Ya Hua Rou Gu Cha Restaurant	131,150

== Preparation ==
Gordon Ramsay was given with a timeline of two days to master all three dishes. He arrived in Singapore on 5 July 2013 and visited the first stall Tian Tian Hainanese Chicken Rice in the noon. A large group of fans were present at Maxwell Food Centre to catch a glimpse of him while he received some tips on how to cook the chicken rice. Later in the day, he also gained tips on how to cook the chilli crab from Jumbo Seafood Restaurant.

On 6 July 2013, Gordon Ramsay met his other rival of 328 Katong Laksa. Upon tasting the laksa sauce, Gordon revealed that he had to change his original plan as he felt that the sauce was better than he'd expected.

== Results ==
On 7 July 2013, Singaporeans began queuing as early as 1 a.m. to get a chance to sample and vote for their favourite local dishes.

Voting was done in the form of SMS and was opened to the 1,000 guests who had turned up to sample Gordon Ramsey's and the hawker's dishes. Each voter had a chance to vote for their favourite dish in the three different categories.

At 9pm, a total of 3,000 votes were tabulated from the members of public and Singapore hawkers emerged as winners. Gordon Ramsay lost by 6% of the total votes, but managed to edge out the chef of Jumbo Seafood Restaurant in the Chilli crab category as his version was voted as the better one.

Percentage of votes for Singapore vs. Ramsey challenge
Food dish	Hawker Heroes	Gordon Ramsay	Winner
Chicken Rice	53%	47%	Tian Tian Hainanese Chicken Rice
Chilli Crab	47.5%	52.5%	Gordon Ramsay
Laksa	59.5%	40.5%	328 Katong Laksa
