= Palm Beach Seafood =

Palm Beach Seafood Restaurant
- Interactive map of Palm Beach Seafood Restaurant

Restaurant information
- Established: 1956; 70 years ago in Singapore
- Owner: Han Jin Juan
- Location: 1 Fullerton Road, #01-09, One Fullerton, Singapore 049213, Singapore
- Coordinates: 1.286320°N 103.854262°E
- Website: palmbeachseafood.com

Palm Beach Seafood Restaurant is a Singaporean restaurant that first began along Upper East Coast Road in Singapore, with its owners credited with inventing and developing the local dish, the Singaporean chili crab.

Founded as a pushcart roadside stall in 1956, it became a permanent restaurant six years later in 1962. Since 2008, the restaurant has been located at the Downtown Core district of Singapore, at the One Fullerton mall.

== History ==
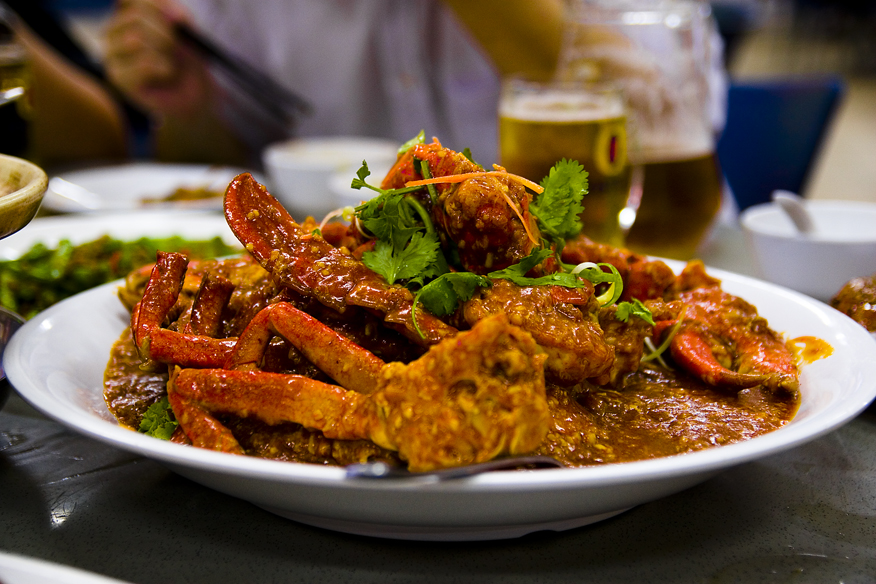
Singapore's chili crab

=== Early years ===
Palm Beach Seafood Restaurant began as a pushcart roadside stall in 1956 by Cher Yam Tian and her husband Lim Choo Ngee.

Cher, who is said to be the creator of the local chilli crab dish, sold stir-fried crabs mixed with bottled chilli and tomato sauce at the stall. The couple eventually expanded their business to establish a restaurant, Palm Beach Seafood Restaurant, along Upper East Coast Road in the early 1960s. The restaurant was named Palm Beach, as there were coconut palms along the beach just outside the restaurant. Up until 1985, they had remained at a coffee-shop along Upper East Coast Road, holding a menu of 9 different crab dishes variations.

=== Retirement and handover ===
When Cher and Lim retired in the 1980s, Palm Beach Seafood Restaurant was eventually bought over by Han Jin Juan. In 1985, Palm Beach merged with the Fisherman restaurant and moved to Halifax Road at Newton. After the premises were burned down in a fire, Palm Beach relocated to the National Stadium at the Kallang Riverside Park in October 1985.

=== Current location ===
In 2008, they moved to One Fullerton along Fullerton Road, and they have remained there to the present day. Today, their One Fullerton restaurant mainly attracts working professionals in the city and tourists.

== Company Profile ==
Today, Palm Beach Seafood Restaurant offers more than 100 items on their menu, with chilli crab being their signature dish.

As the current owner and managing director, Han Jin Juan keeps himself up to date on the latest trends, which helps to develop Palm Beach’s menu. Head Chef, Wong Ah Kun, runs the kitchen and has worked at Palm Beach for 20 years. According to Chef Wong, Palm Beach takes pride in ensuring that they “keep their recipes consistent and do not compromise on food quality.”

=== Company Practices ===
To help increase productivity, Palm Beach has implemented some of the following initiatives:

- In 2005, restaurant staff carried PDAs to transmit orders wirelessly. To improve efficiency, the restaurant upgraded its mobile point of sales (POS) system to take orders via tablet computers instead of PDAs in 2011. To gather customer feedback, guests are also handed the tablets at the end of every meal.
- The restaurant had adopted the 5S methodology system, a housekeeping technique for kitchens, in 2008. With items clearly labeled and sorted, staff can retrieve items quickly, helping to reduce the amount of time spent training new staff.
- Palm Beach is the first Singaporean restaurant to launch the Mystery Diner programme in 2005, in collaboration with the Restaurant Association of Singapore (RAS) and SPRING Singapore. The mystery diner audit is a means for the company to improve service standards.

As a result of these initiatives, Han reported that his company’s profits had grown between 10 and 15 per cent annually, from 2008 to 2012.

== Notable projects ==
In 1994, Palm Beach ventured into the franchise business and awarded their first franchise to an Indonesian company, Sinovo Foods.

In 2008, Palm Beach restaurant collaborated with other notable local seafood restaurants, Jumbo Seafood and Seafood International, to start up two Singapore Seafood Republic outlets in Tokyo, featuring Singapore seafood dishes. After the success of their first two restaurants in Tokyo, they set up other outlets in Singapore (2010), Osaka (2011) and Tokyo (2013).

== Awards ==
Selected awards achieved by Palm Beach restaurant:

Year	Award Received
1992–2003	Singapore Tatler – Singapore’s Best Restaurant
1996–2000	Singapore Food Festival – Most Popular Seafood Restaurant
1997–2008	Singapore Tourism Board – Excellent Service Awards
2002	Restaurant Association Of Singapore – Excellence Service Award
2004–2005	Superbrands Singapore
2007	Singapore Food Festival – Media’s Choice Award for Ginger Giant Prawns.
2008	Singapore Food Festival – City Gas Singapore Chef of the Year Award (Tay Jun Hua)
2008–2010	Singapore Tourism Board – Singapore Service Star Award
2010	Top 10 Seafood by Hungrygowhere TASTY Singapore Chef RAS Runner-Up

== See also ==
- List of seafood restaurants
- Long Beach Seafood Restaurant
