= Long Beach Seafood Restaurant =

Singaporean restaurant chain

- Industry: Restaurant
- Founded: Singapore
- Area served: Singapore
- Products: Seafood
- Website: www.longbeachseafood.com.sg

The Long Beach Seafood Restaurant (Simplified Chinese: 长堤海鲜楼) is a Singaporean restaurant chain best known for creating the original black pepper crabs. The main restaurant is located along the East Coast Parkway, with four other branches in Marina South, IMM Building, East Coast Seafood Centre and Dempsey Road at Tanglin.

== History ==
The restaurant has been in existence since the 1940s with its first outlet at Bedok Resthouse, and has helped shape Singapore's local seafood culinary tastes. Besides the black pepper crabs, it also lays claim to being the first restaurant in Singapore to serve live seafood, and its menu of barbecued tilapia, drunken prawns and crispy duck have become common dishes in other contemporary seafood restaurants.

The restaurant also sells Chilli crab, one of the national dishes of Singapore which was also invented along the East Coast area.

== See also ==
- Chilli crab
- List of seafood restaurants
- Singaporean cuisine
