= Coromoto =

Coromoto may refer to:

== Places ==
- Heladería Coromoto, an ice cream shop in Venezuela

== People ==
- Coromoto Godoy (born c. 1965), Venezuelan diplomat

== Religion ==
- Our Lady of Coromoto, the patroness of Venezuela
