= List of crab dishes =

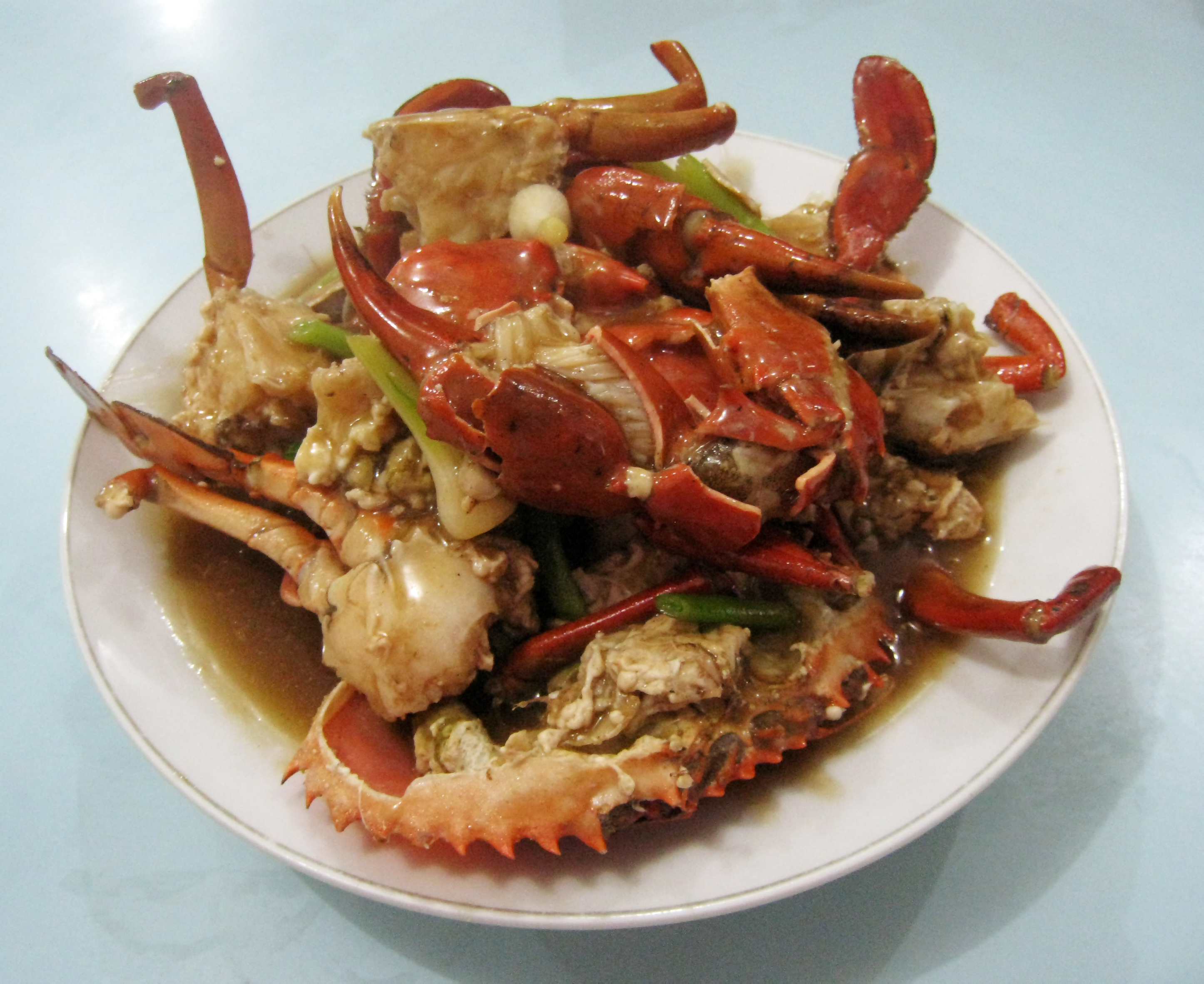
Kepiting saus tiram: Chinese-Indonesian crab in oyster sauce

This is a list of crab dishes. Crabs live in all the world's oceans, in fresh water, and on land, are generally covered with a thick exoskeleton and are arthropoda and have a single pair of claws. Crab meat is the meat found within a crab. It is used in many cuisines around the world.

== Crab dishes ==
Gejang

- Bisque (food) – a smooth, creamy, highly seasoned soup of French origin, classically based on a strained broth (coulis) of crustaceans. It can be made from lobster, crab, shrimp or crayfish.
- Black pepper crab – one of the two most popular ways that crab is served in Malaysia and Singapore. It is made with hard-shell crabs, and fried with black pepper. Unlike the other popular chilli crab dish, it is less heavy due to the absence of a sauce.
- Bún riêu – Bún riêu cua is served with tomato broth and topped with crab or shrimp paste.
- Chilli crab – a seafood dish popular in Malaysia and Singapore. Mud crabs are commonly used and are stir-fried in a semi-thick, sweet and savoury tomato-and-chilli-based sauce.
- Corn crab soup – a dish found in Chinese cuisine, American Chinese cuisine, and Canadian Chinese cuisine, it is actually cream of corn soup with egg white and crab meat or imitation crab meat added.
- Crab bee hoon
- Crab cake – a variety of fishcake which is popular in the United States composed of crab meat and various other ingredients, such as bread crumbs, milk, mayonnaise, eggs, yellow onions, and seasonings.
- Crab curry –
- Crab dip – typically prepared with cream cheese and lump crab meat.
- Crab ice cream – a Japanese creation, it is described as having a sweet taste. The island of Hokkaido, Japan, is known for manufacturing crab ice cream.
- Crab in oyster sauce – a Chinese seafood dish of crab served in savoury oyster sauce. It is a popular dish in Asia, that can be found from China, Malaysia, Singapore, Indonesia to the Philippines.
- Crab in Padang sauce or Padang crab (Indonesian: Kepiting saus Padang) – an Indonesian seafood dish of crab served in hot and spicy Padang sauce. It is a popular dish in Indonesia.
- Crab Louie – American salad featuring crab meat.
- Crab puff
- Crab rangoon – deep-fried dumpling appetizers served in American Chinese and, more recently, Thai restaurants, stuffed with a combination of cream cheese, lightly flaked crab meat (more commonly, canned crab meat or imitation crab meat), with scallions, and/or garlic.
- Curacha Alavar - Filipino spanner crabs in coconut milk with various spices
- Deviled crab – a crab meat croquette. The crab meat is slowly sauteed with seasonings, breaded (traditionally with stale Cuban bread), rolled into the approximate shape of a rugby football or a small potato, and deep fried.
- Dressed crab - a traditional English cuisine seafood meal
- Echizen kanimeshi - a type of ekiben from Fukui Prefecture, on the coast of the Sea of Japan
- Ganzuke - a variety of shiokara, salted fermented seafood in Japanese cuisine
- Gejang – a variety of jeotgal, salted fermented seafood in Korean cuisine, which is made by marinating fresh raw crabs either in ganjang (soy sauce) or in a sauce based on chili pepper powder. A similar dish (生腌蟹) exists in China.
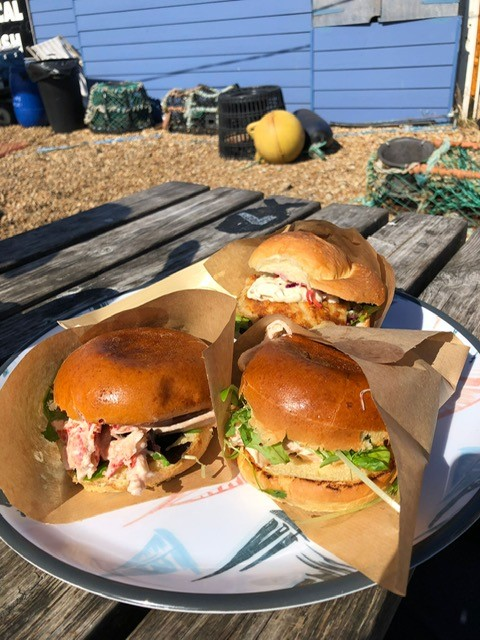
- Crab and lobster rolls by the sea in Kent, England
  Ginataang alimango/Ginataang alimasag - Filipino black crab or flower crab in coconut milk with calabaza and spices
- Ginataang curacha - Filipino spanner crabs in coconut milk
- Halabos - Filipino crabs (or other crustaceans) cooked in saltwater with spices
- Inulukan - Filipino black crabs in coconut milk and taro leaves.
- Jaffna crab curry (also known as Kakuluwo curry) - a traditional Sri Lankan crab curry.
- Kanijiru - a traditional Japanese crab soup
- Kare rajungan - a traditional Indonesian dish of a blue crab in a curry sauce. It is a delicacy from Tuban, East Java.
- Ketam Masak Lemak Cili Api campur Nenas - a traditional Malaysian crab dish which crab is cooked with green spicy chilli and coconut milk together with pineapples. The sweetness of the crab meat (normally flower crab) is intensified by adding the pineapples.
- Kani Cream Korokke - a Japanese take on the traditional French croquette; can be made with either real or imitation crab meat (although imitation crab meat versions are more commonplace).
- Njandu roast - Kerala style crab roast.
- Pastel de jaiba - Chilean crab (jaiba in local Spanish) pie.
- She-crab soup- a rich soup, similar to bisque, made of milk or heavy cream, crab or fish stock, Atlantic blue crab meat, and (traditionally) crab roe, and a small amount of dry sherry.
- Soft-shell crab – a culinary term for crabs which have recently molted their old exoskeleton and are still soft.
- Taba ng talangka - traditional Filipino fermented crab paste. It can be eaten as is over white rice, but can also be used as a condiment or as an ingredient in various Filipino seafood dishes.
- West Indies salad – a variation of crab meat ceviche that originated in the Mobile, Alabama area and is still a regional seafood delicacy enjoyed today.
Crab dishes

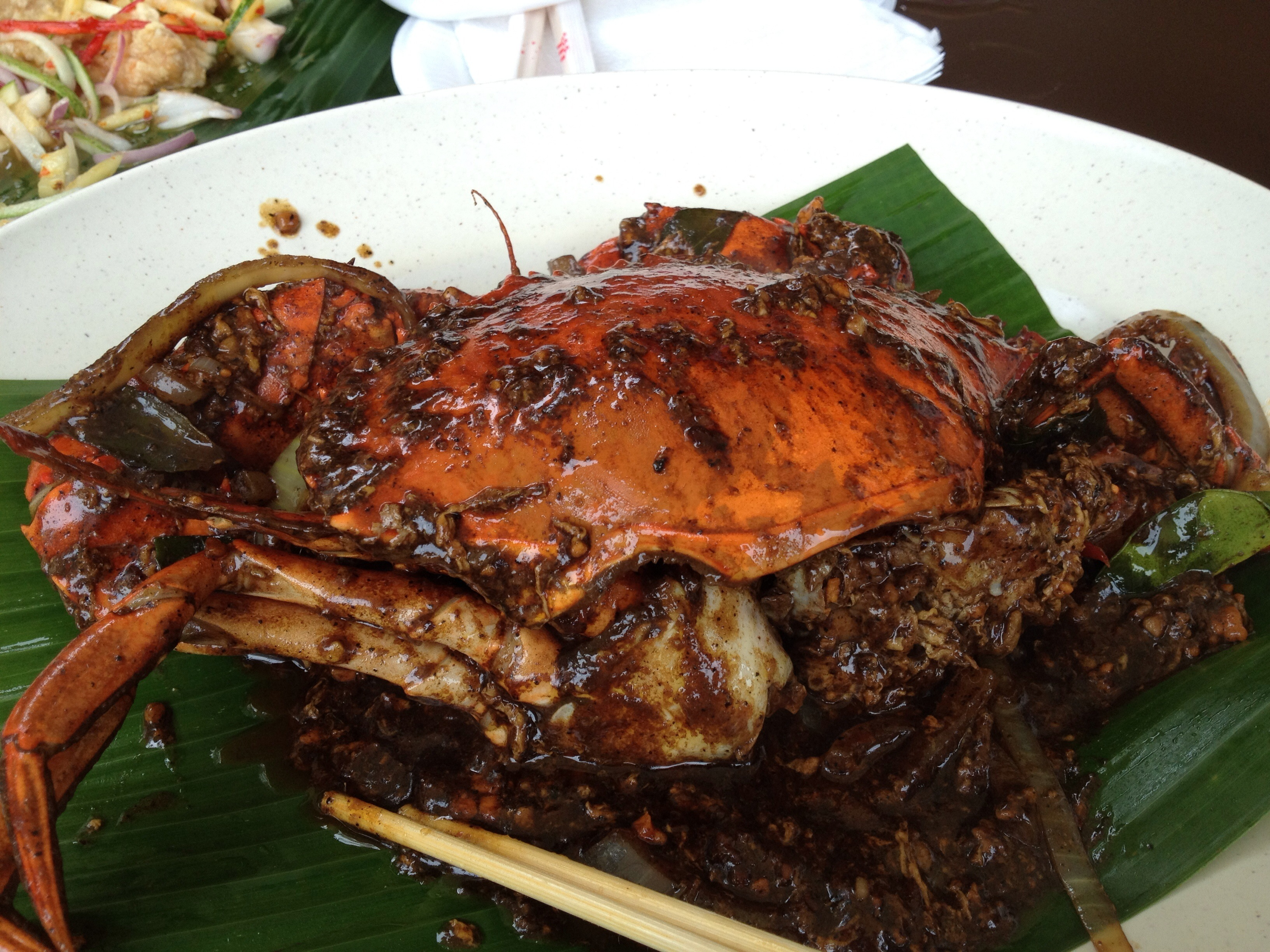
Black pepper crab

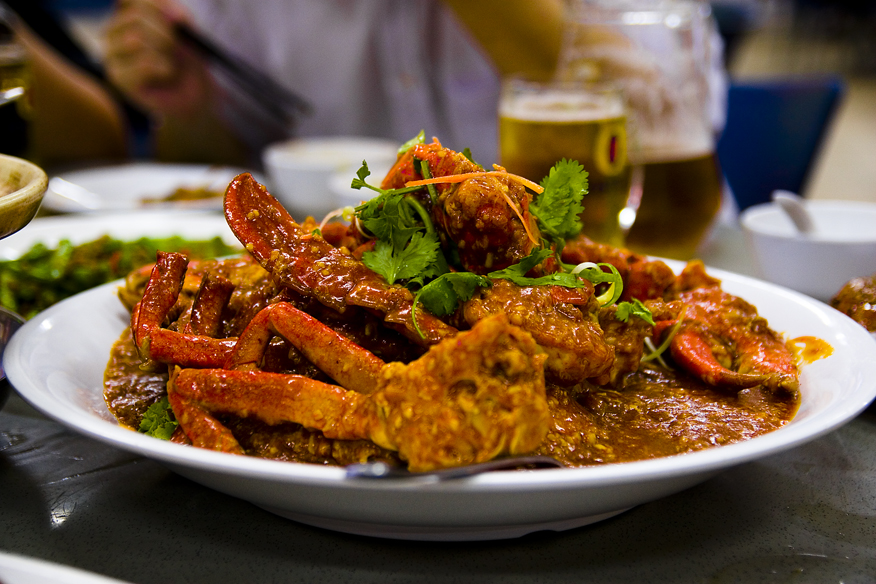
A plate of Chilli crab

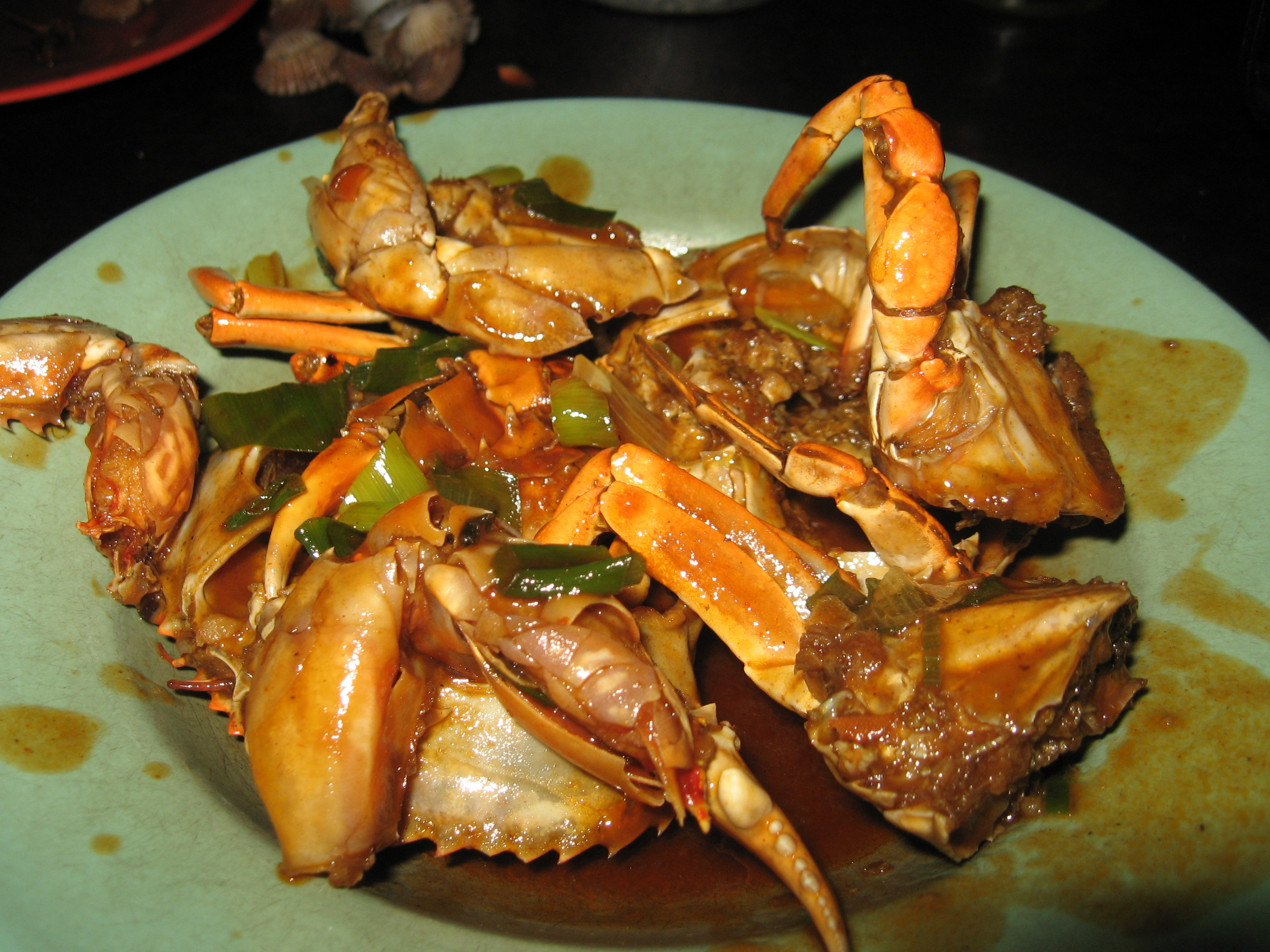
Crab in Padang sauce

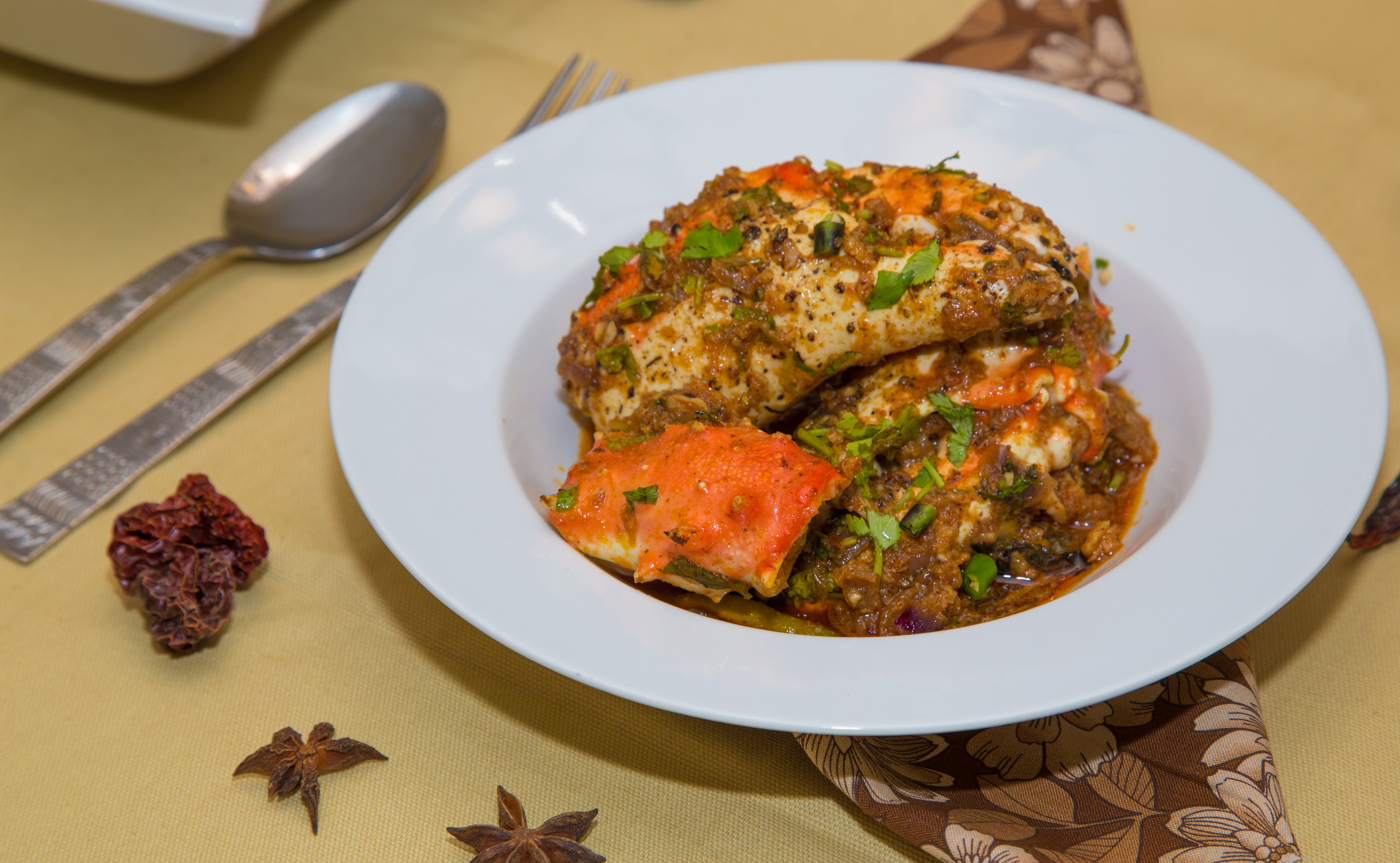
Indian Crab masala

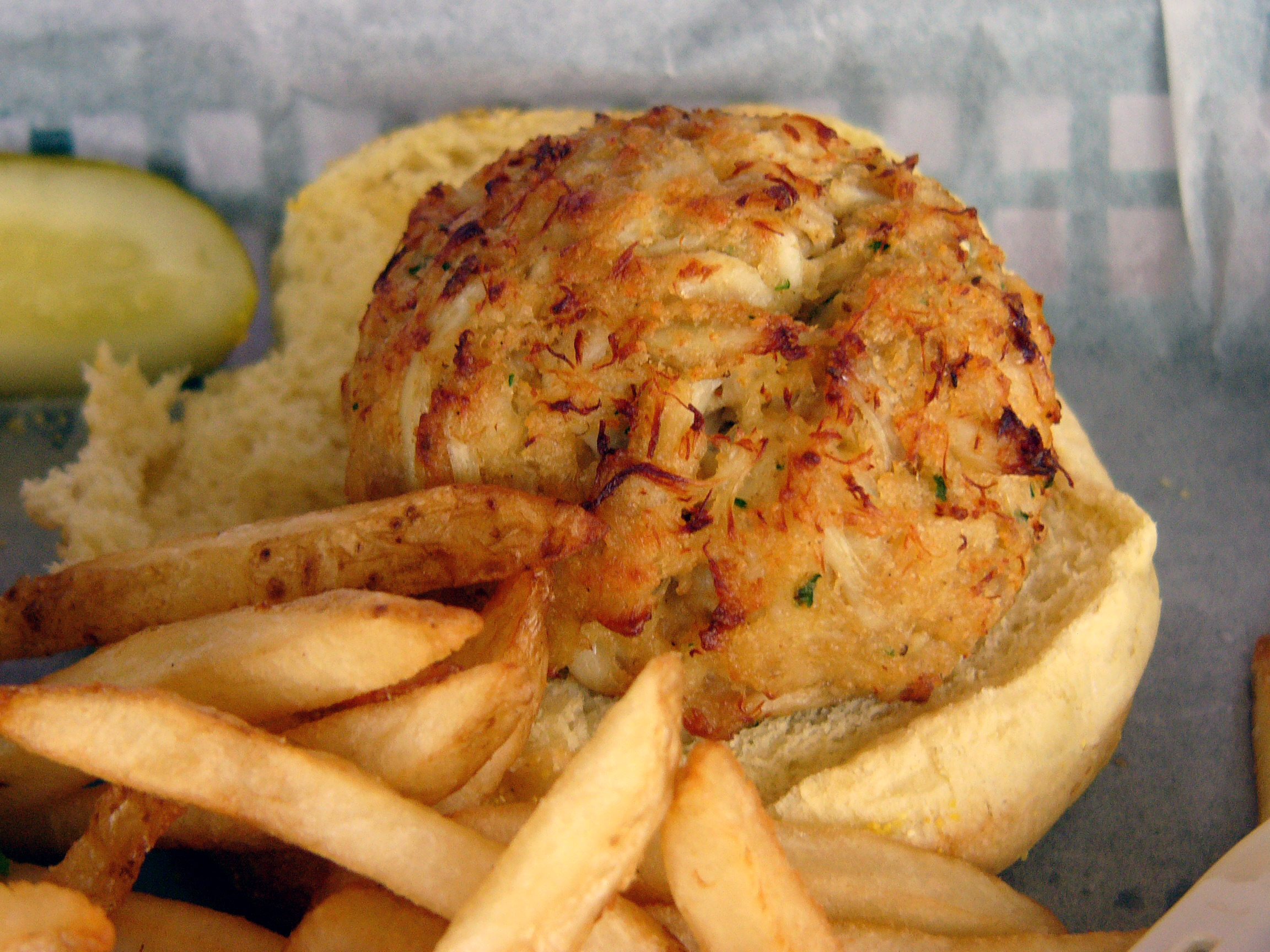
A crab cake served atop a bun

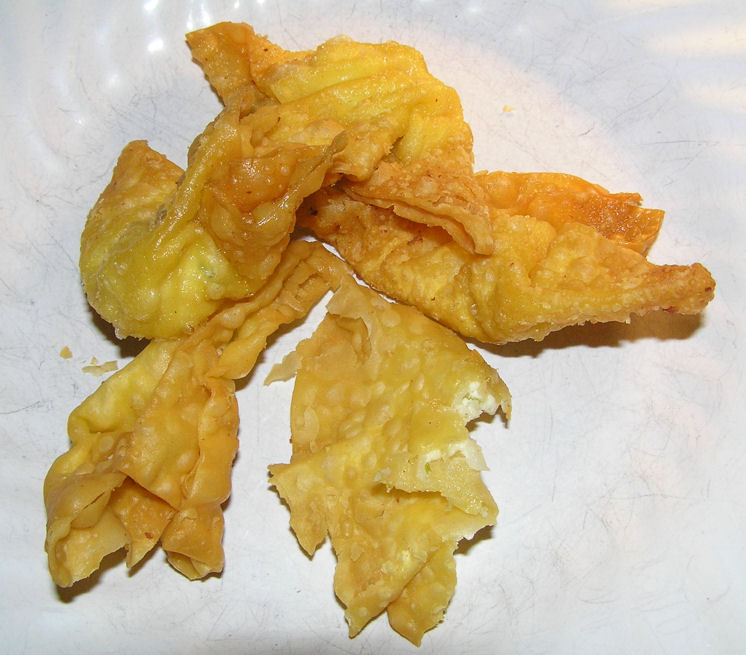
Crab rangoon

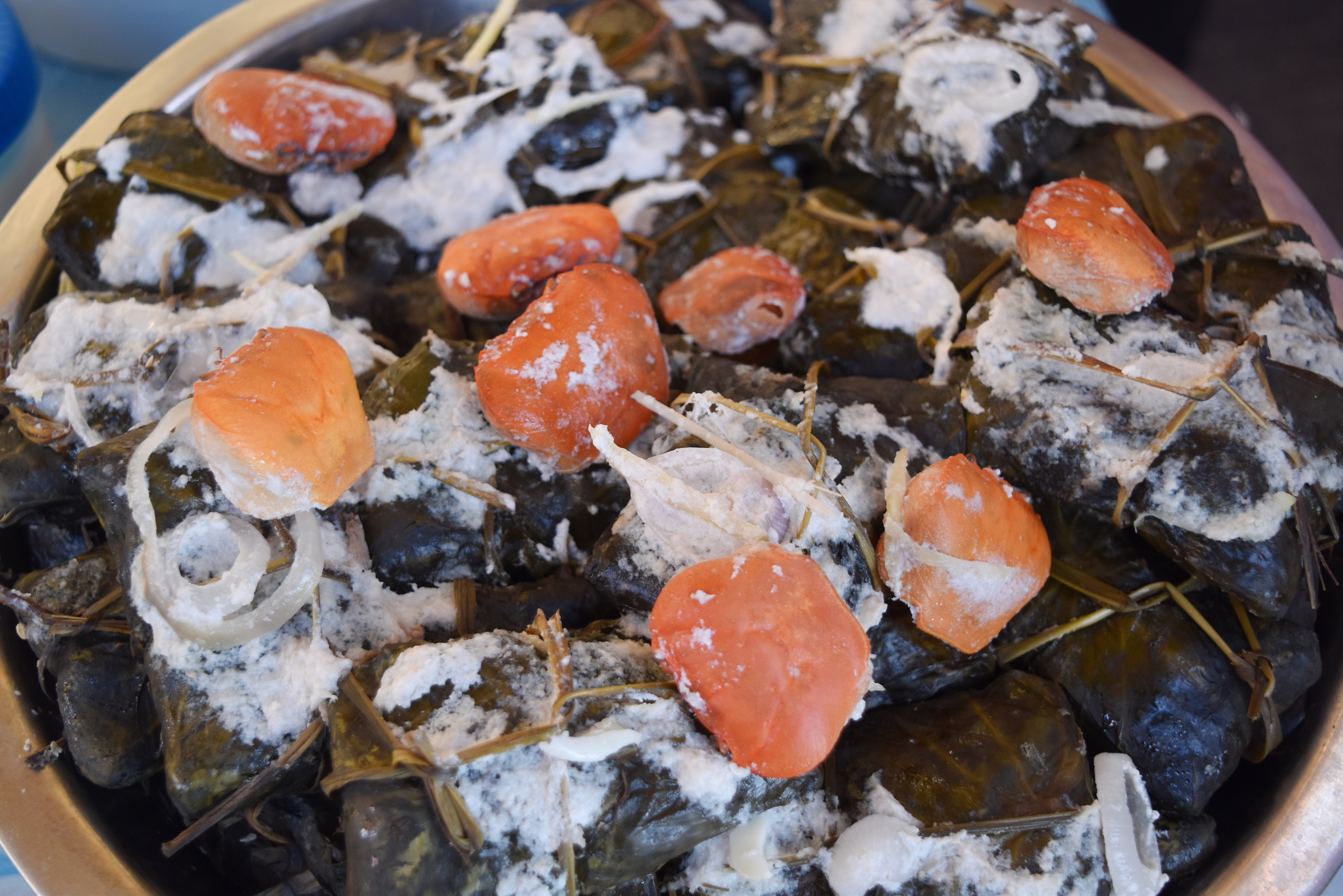
Inulukan in coconut milk and taro leaves

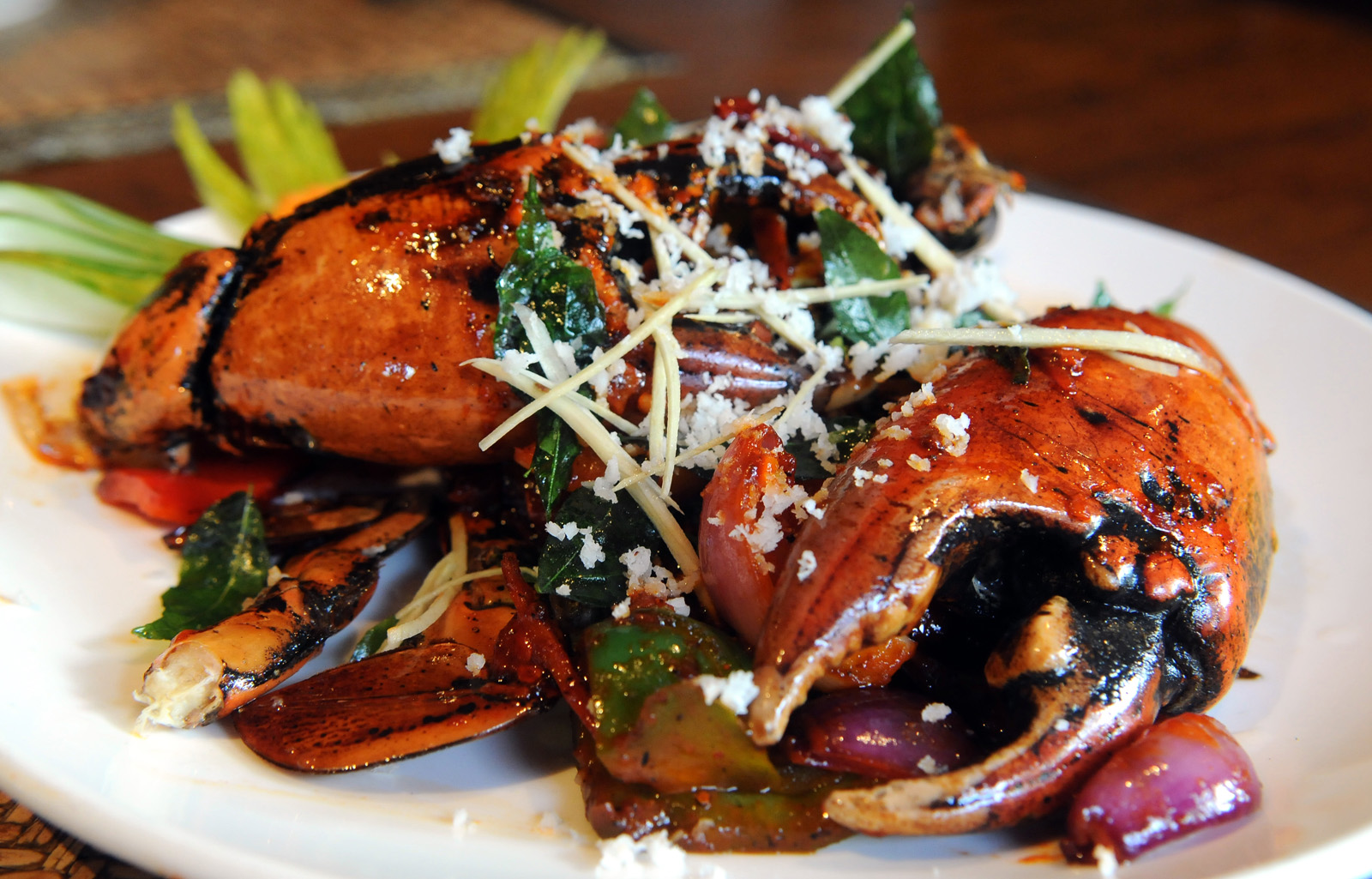
Kerala Chilli Crab - South Indian food preparation

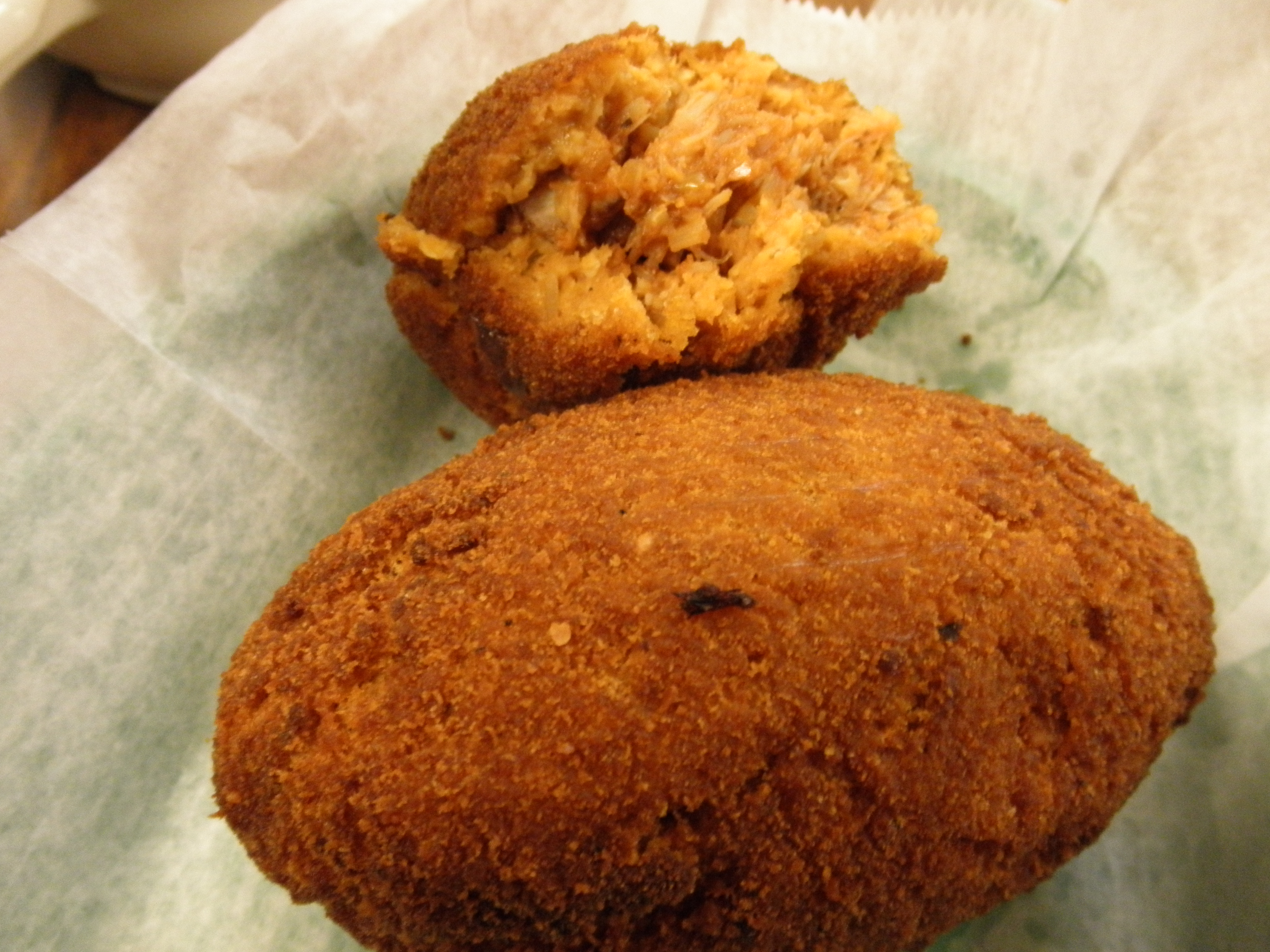
Deviled crab

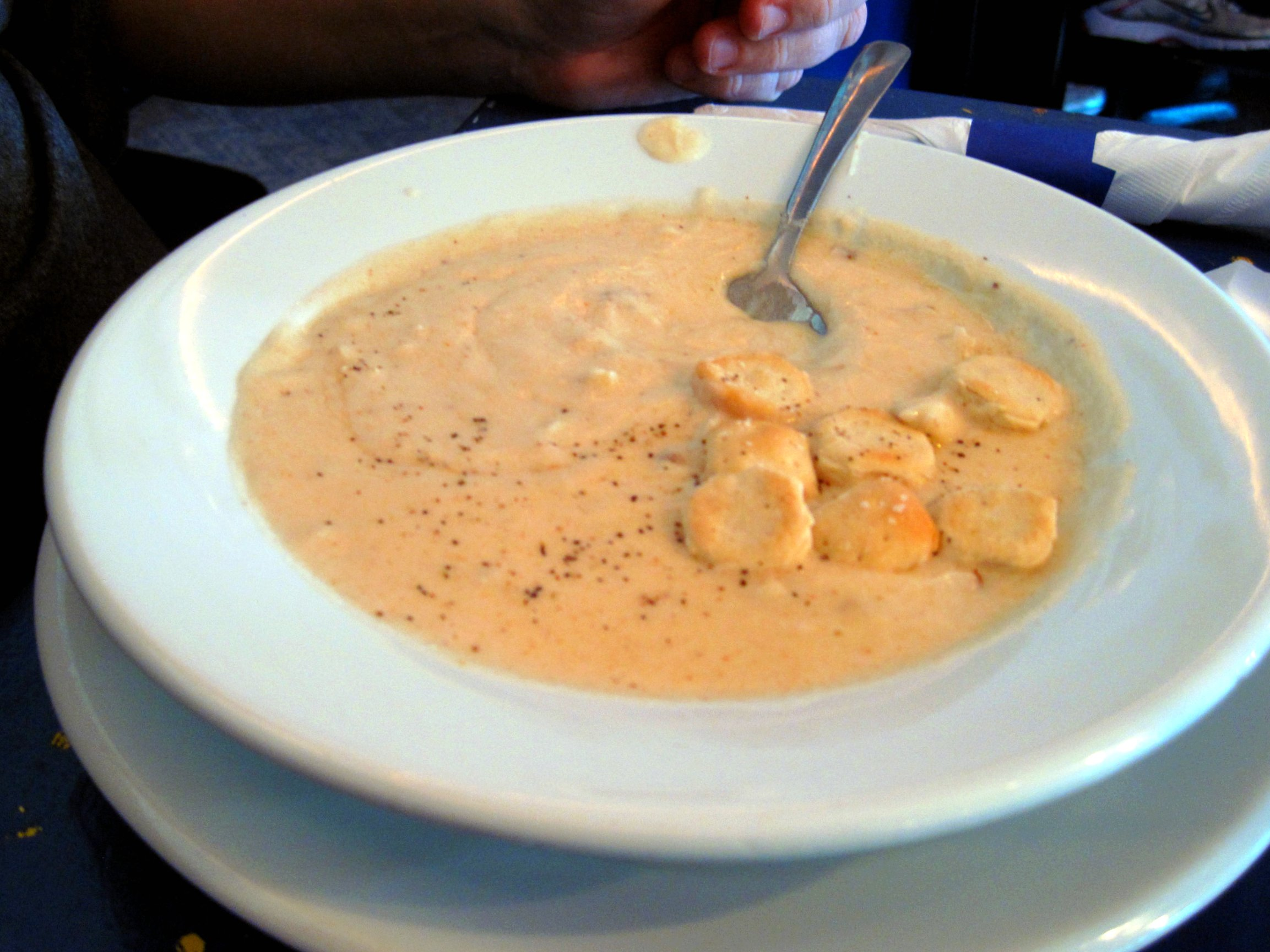
She-crab soup

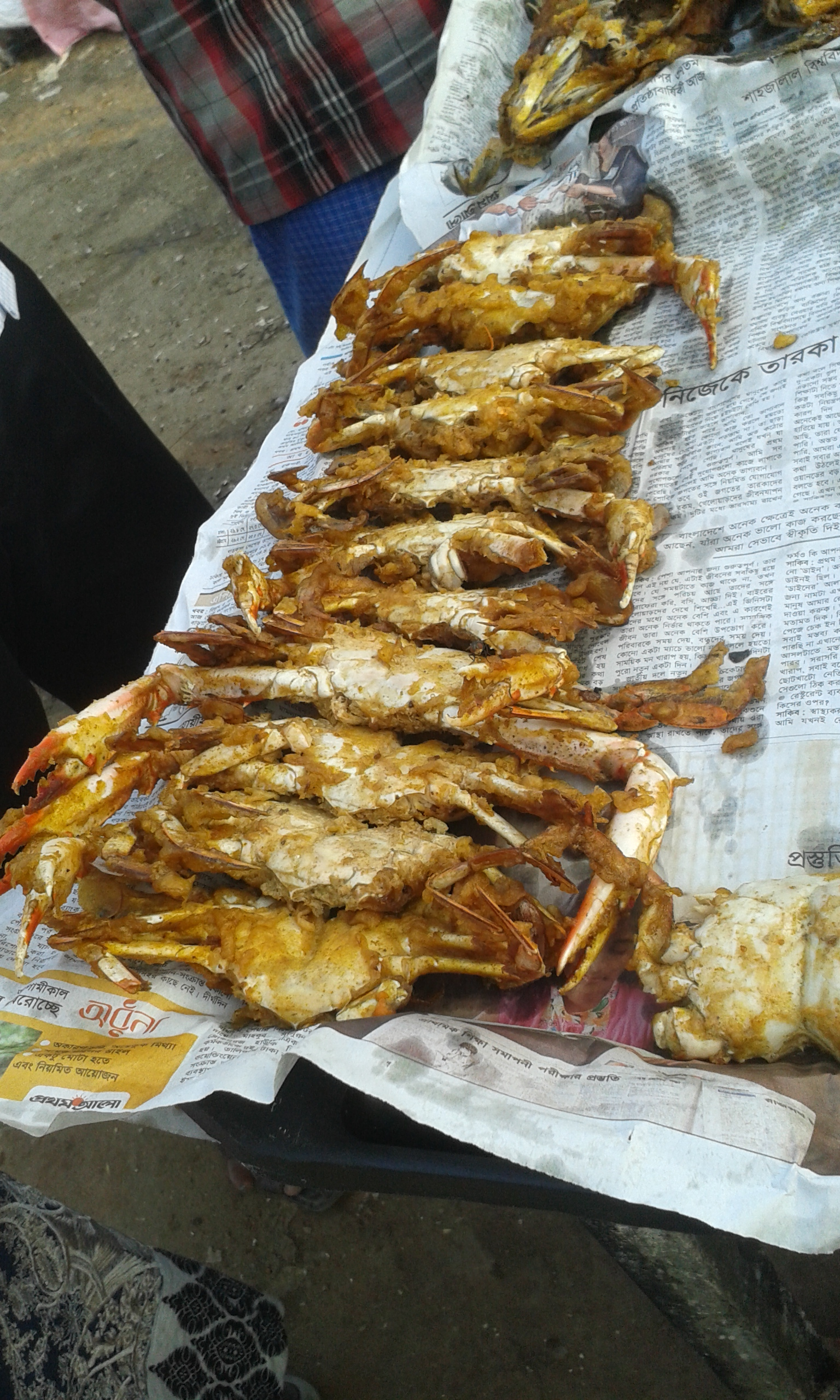
Fried crabs

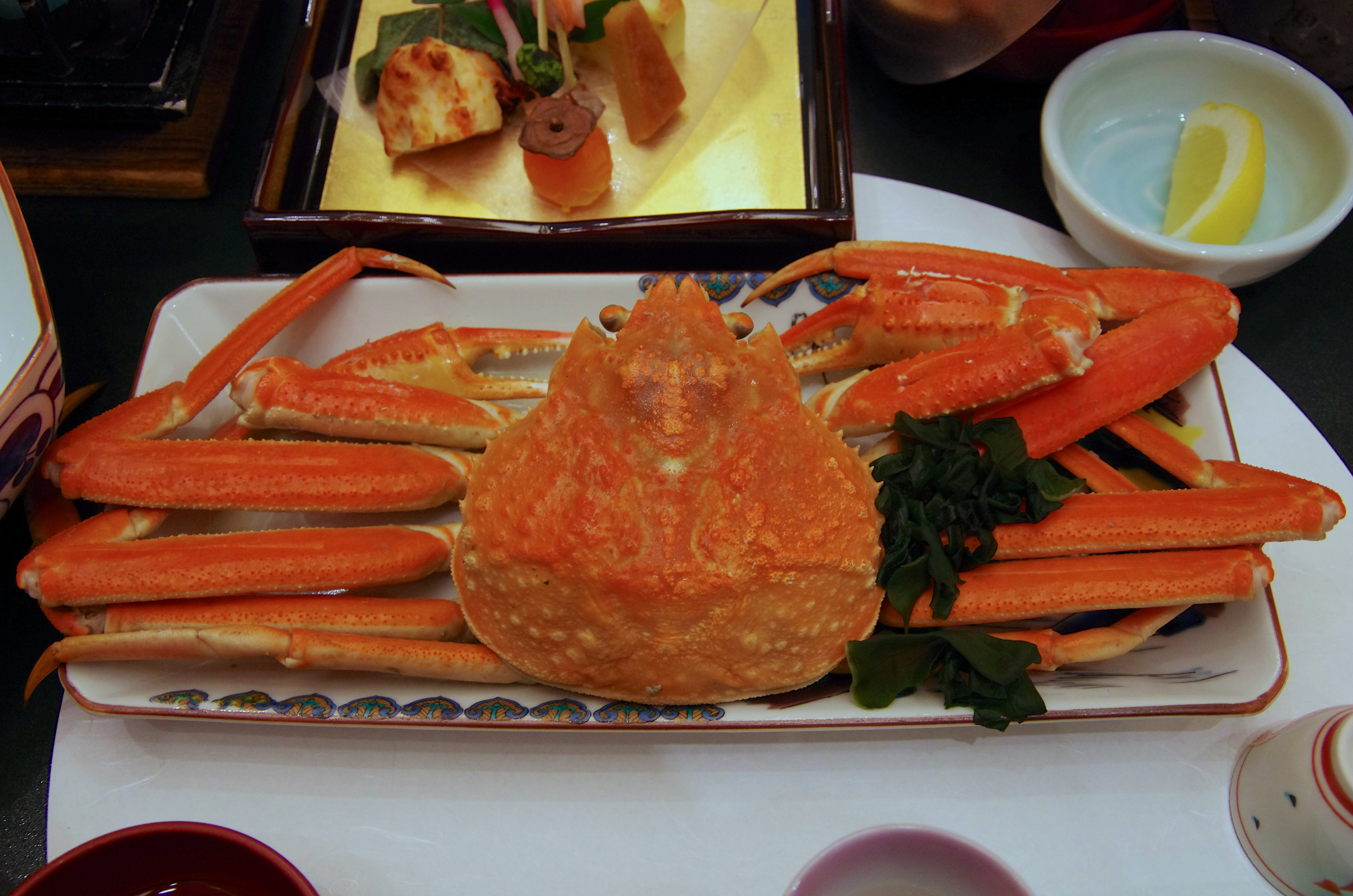
Japanese boiled crab

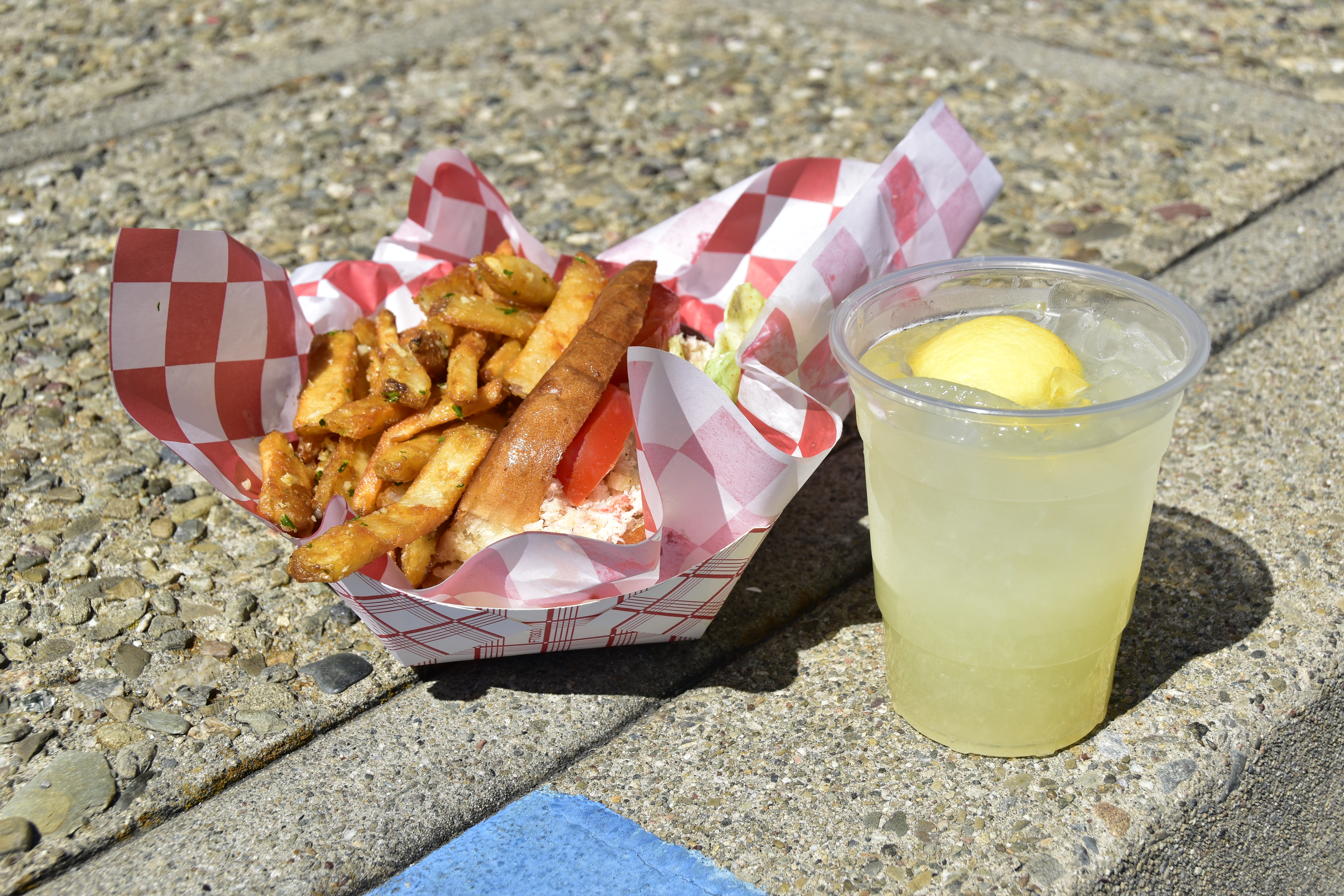
American crab roll

== See also ==
- Declawing of crabs
- List of seafood dishes
- List of fish dishes
