= Crab ice cream =

Ice cream made with crabmeat

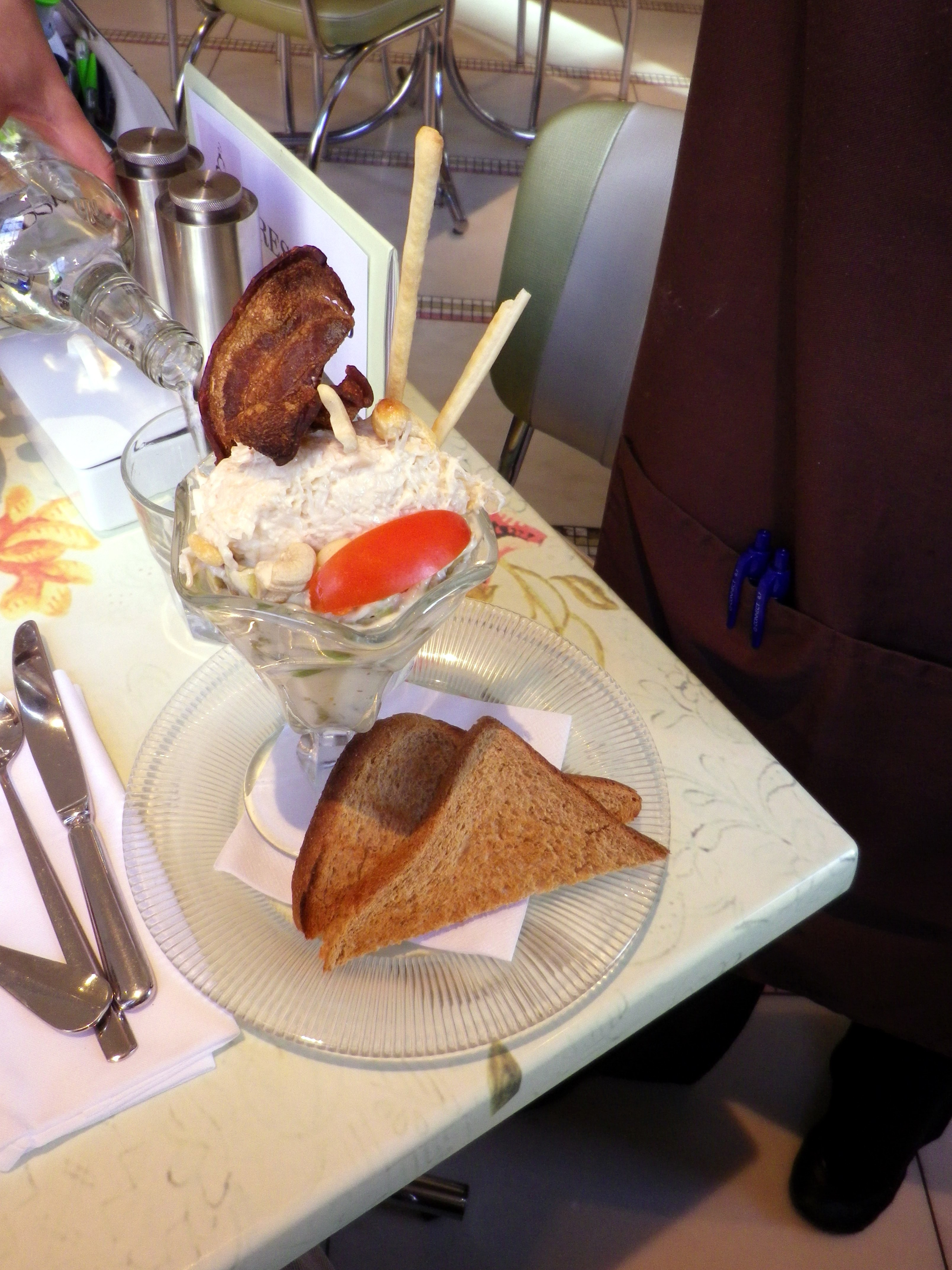
- A crab ice cream sundae.
- Type: Frozen dessert
- Main ingredients: Ice cream, crab

Crab ice cream is a sweet, novelty flavour of ice cream with crab. It is offered in some food establishments, particularly ice cream parlours, such as Heston Blumenthal's The Fat Duck restaurant, and the Venezuelan Coromoto.

== History and production ==
Crab ice cream is a Japanese creation. The island of Hokkaido, Japan, is known for manufacturing crab ice cream.

== Preparation and description ==
Heston Blumenthal's recipe for crab ice cream involves freezing for half an hour a mixture of stock made mainly from crab (or prawns as an alternative) and a little milk powder (skimmed), a dozen yolks of egg, and some sugar. Crab ice cream is described to be sweet in flavour to the majority of people, although some may taste otherwise as it has been proven that taste is affected by the brain's expectations. Blumenthal has compared crab ice cream to "frozen crab bisque".

== Notable uses ==
Crab ice cream is made by Heston Blumenthal, a renowned chef and owner of the Fat Duck, in Berkshire, England, as a dessert item on his restaurant's food menu, although he admits that it is difficult to convince customers to try it. He also made it once for testing by food scientists in June 2011, and for an ice cream occasion at the Royal Institution in June 2001. Heladería Coromoto, a Mérida-based ice cream shop, which has the biggest variety of ice cream sold in the world, offers "Cream of Crab" as one of its ice cream flavours. In its country of origin, Japan, crab ice cream is marketed in Japanese as Kani aisu. A Delaware-based ice cream parlor once attempted to make their own crab ice cream, but the end product was deemed a failure.

== See also ==
- List of ice cream flavors
- List of crab dishes
- List of seafood dishes
