= Crab in oyster sauce =

Indonesian and Chinese crab dish

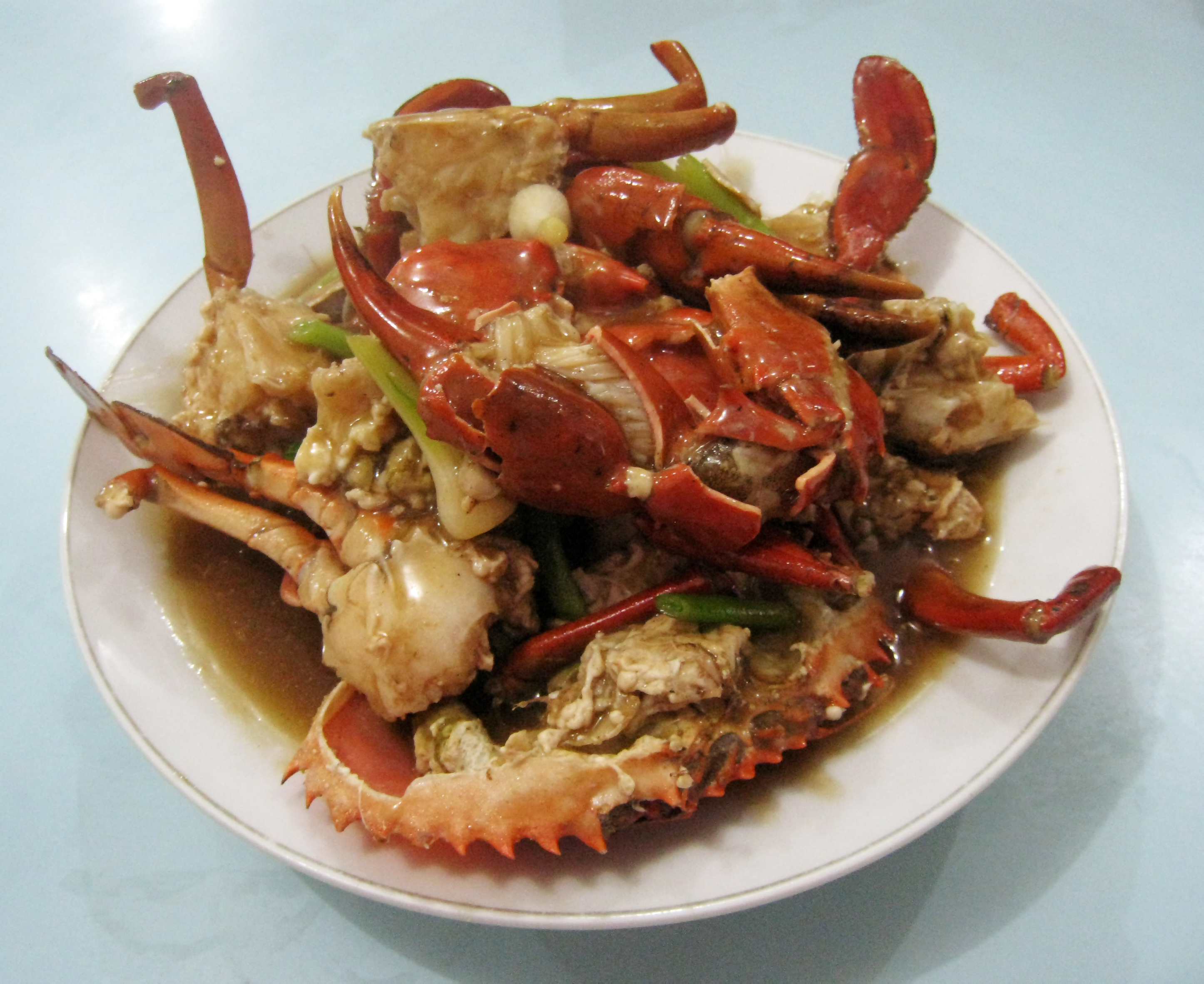
- Kepiting saus tiram, Chinese-Indonesian crab in oyster sauce
- Alternative names: Indonesian: Kepiting saus tiram
- Course: Main course
- Place of origin: China and Indonesia
- Region or state: East Asia and Southeast Asia notably: Indonesia, Philippines, Singapore
- Created by: Chinese cuisine
- Serving temperature: Hot
- Main ingredients: Crab served in oyster sauce, garlic, ginger and scallion

Crab in oyster sauce or oyster sauce crab is a Chinese seafood dish of crab served in savoury oyster sauce. It is a popular dish across Asia.

== Origin ==
Crab in oyster sauce can trace its origin to Southern China's Cantonese cuisine, more precisely, after the development of oyster sauce in the late 19th century. The dish then spread across Asia. Known in Indonesia as kepiting saus tiram, it is a popular seafood in Chinese Indonesian cuisine, being one of the two most popular ways of serving crab.

== Ingredients ==
The most popular crab species used in this recipe is mud crab, though blue crab may also be used.

The crabs are cut into pieces and stir-fried shortly in a wok on strong fire in cooking oil and water, garlic, ginger, onion and scallion, mixed with oyster sauce, soy sauce, ang ciu (Chinese cooking wine) and sugar. Then the sauce is thickened with a corn starch and water mixture. The mild umami (savoury) seafood flavour of oyster sauce tends to enhance the natural flavour of the crab.

== See also ==
- Crab in Padang sauce
- Chili crab
- Black pepper crab
- Chinese Indonesian cuisine
- List of crab dishes
- List of seafood dishes
- Peranakan cuisine
