= Crab cake =

American crab dish

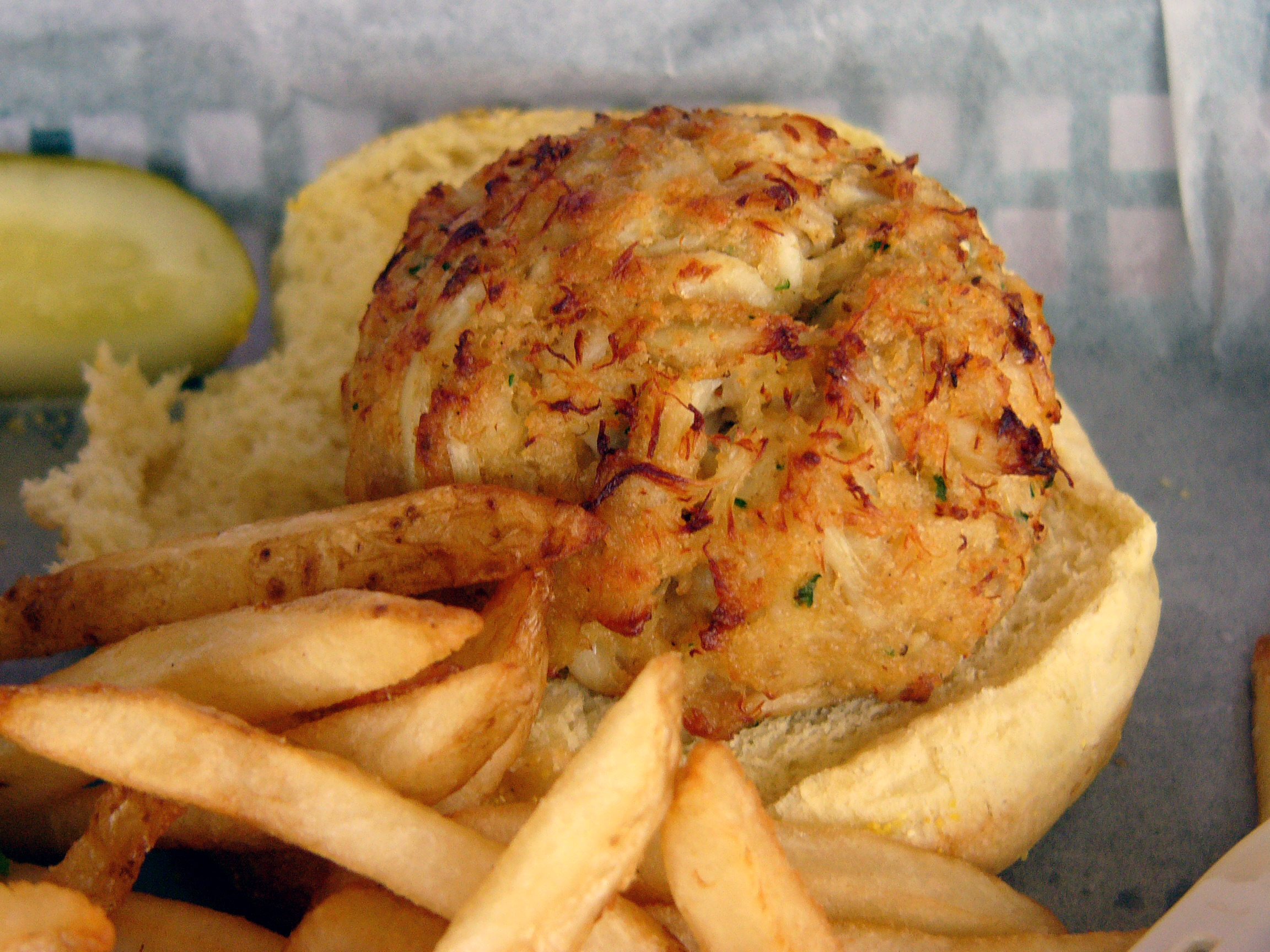
Crab cake served on a bun, from a tavern in Maryland

A crab cake is a variety of fishcake popular in the United States. It is composed of crab meat and various other ingredients, such as bread crumbs, mayonnaise, mustard (typically prepared mustard, but sometimes mustard powder), eggs, and seasonings. It is then sautéed, baked, grilled, deep fried, or broiled. Crab cakes are traditionally associated with the Chesapeake Bay, in the state of Maryland. Although the earliest use of the term "crab cake" is commonly believed to date to Crosby Gaige's 1939 publication New York World's Fair Cook Book in which they are described as "Baltimore crab cakes," earlier usages can be found such as in Thomas J. Murrey's book Cookery with a Chafing Dish published in 1891.

Crab cakes are particularly popular along the coast of the Mid-Atlantic where the crabbing industry thrives. They can also be commonly found in New England, the South Atlantic states, the Gulf Coast, the Pacific Northwest, and the Northern California coast. While meat from any species of crab may be used, the blue crab, whose native habitat includes the Chesapeake Bay, is the traditional choice and generally considered to be the best tasting. In the Pacific Northwest and northern California, the Dungeness crab is a popular ingredient for crab cakes, and the cakes are prepared at many restaurants throughout the region.

== Sides ==
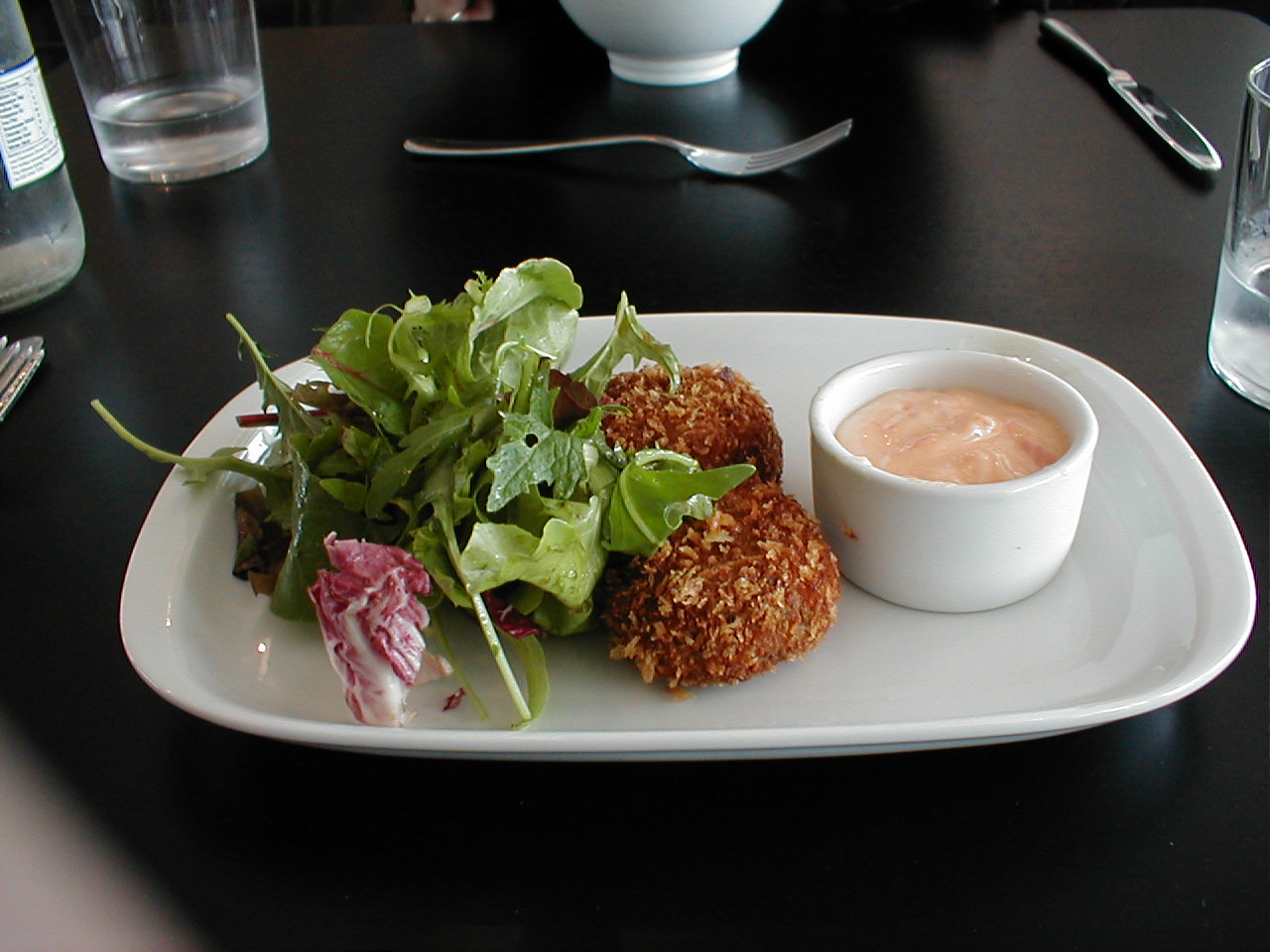
Crab cakes topped with greens, served at a London museum

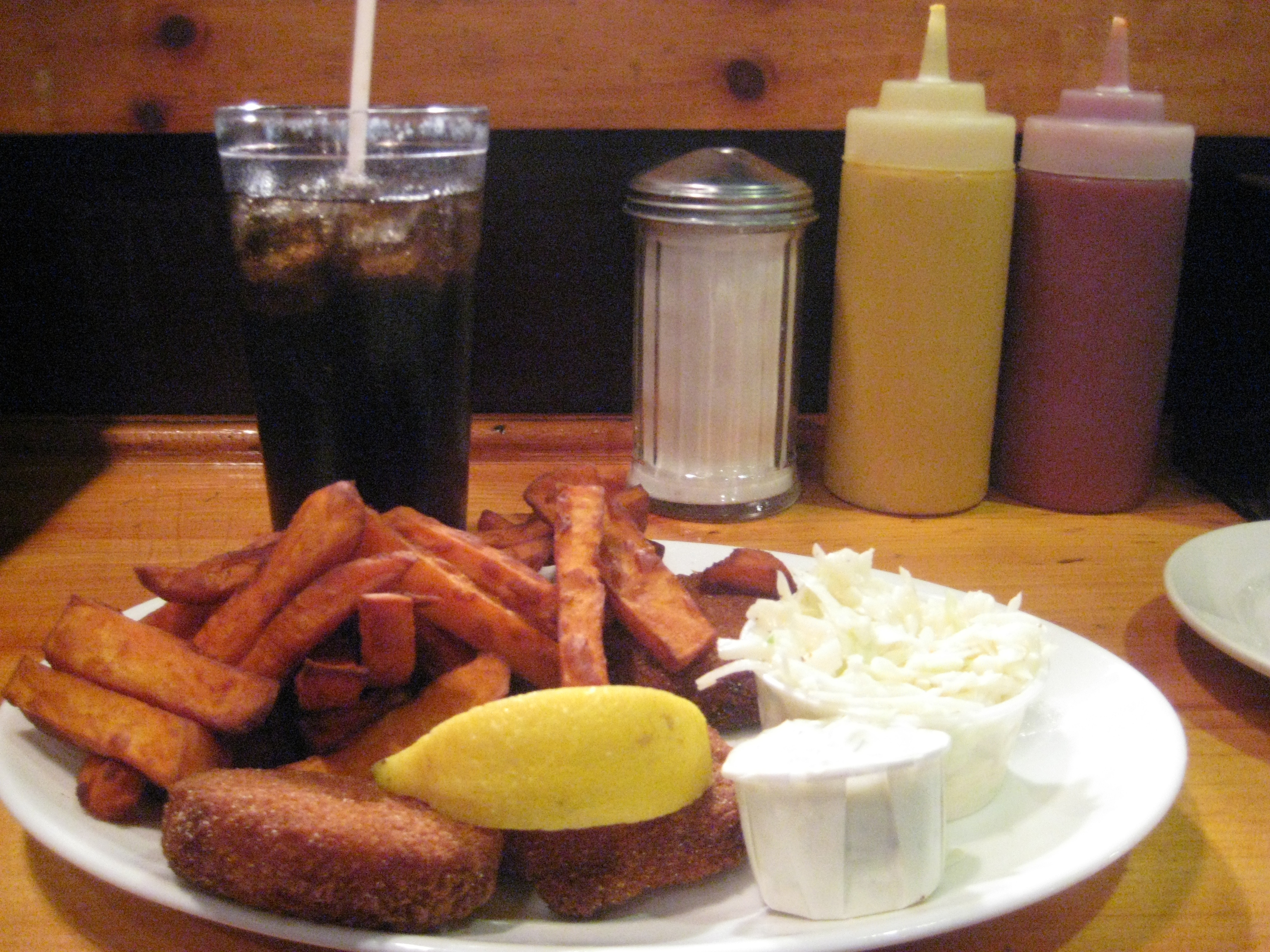
Crab cakes with sweet potato fries, coleslaw, and tartar sauce, as served at a Massachusetts restaurant

The sides accompanying crab cakes are usually french fries, coleslaw, potato salad, or macaroni salad. Restaurants serve crab cakes with a lemon wedge and saltine crackers and sometimes with other condiments such as a remoulade, tartar sauce, mustard, cocktail sauce, ketchup, or Worcestershire sauce. Many restaurants give their patrons the choice of having their crab cake fried or broiled. Crab cakes vary in size, from no bigger than a small cookie to larger than a hamburger.

== Maryland crab cake ==
Crab cakes in Maryland traditionally consist of no other ingredients than jumbo lump meat picked from steamed blue crabs, a very small amount of binder and maybe a spice with a significant tie to the state like Old Bay. The ingredients are formed into cakes and cooled in a refrigerator for a period of time allowing them to firm up. This is done to minimize the amount of binder needed to hold them together during the cooking process. The cold cakes are then heated for a short time through either the frying or broiling method.

Many restaurants and fish markets outside of the state of Maryland advertise their crab cake product as "Maryland Crab Cake" or "Maryland-Style" even though they are often made in a manner inconsistent with Maryland tradition. They may include many other ingredients that result in a lower percentage of crab meat being used along with a different taste. They may also substitute crab meat of the cheaper blue swimmer for that of the blue crab species native to the Chesapeake Bay. Labeling of the crab cakes may help consumers determine the quality of meat used, as lump or jumbo lump meat, derived from the muscle of the crab, is understood to be the highest quality. The foreign product is often harvested using methods and practices considered unsustainable in the United States, where the crabbing industry is carefully regulated to ensure sustainability.

== See also ==
- Croquette – Small breaded, deep-fried food
- Clam cake – Seafood dish
- Corn fritters – Fried cakes of maize dough
- Fishcake – Fried minced or ground seafood
- Hushpuppy – Deep-fried savory food made from cornmeal batter
- Pempek – Indonesian dish made of fish and tapioca
- List of crab dishes
- List of seafood dishes
