= Jumbo Seafood =

Singaporean restaurant chain

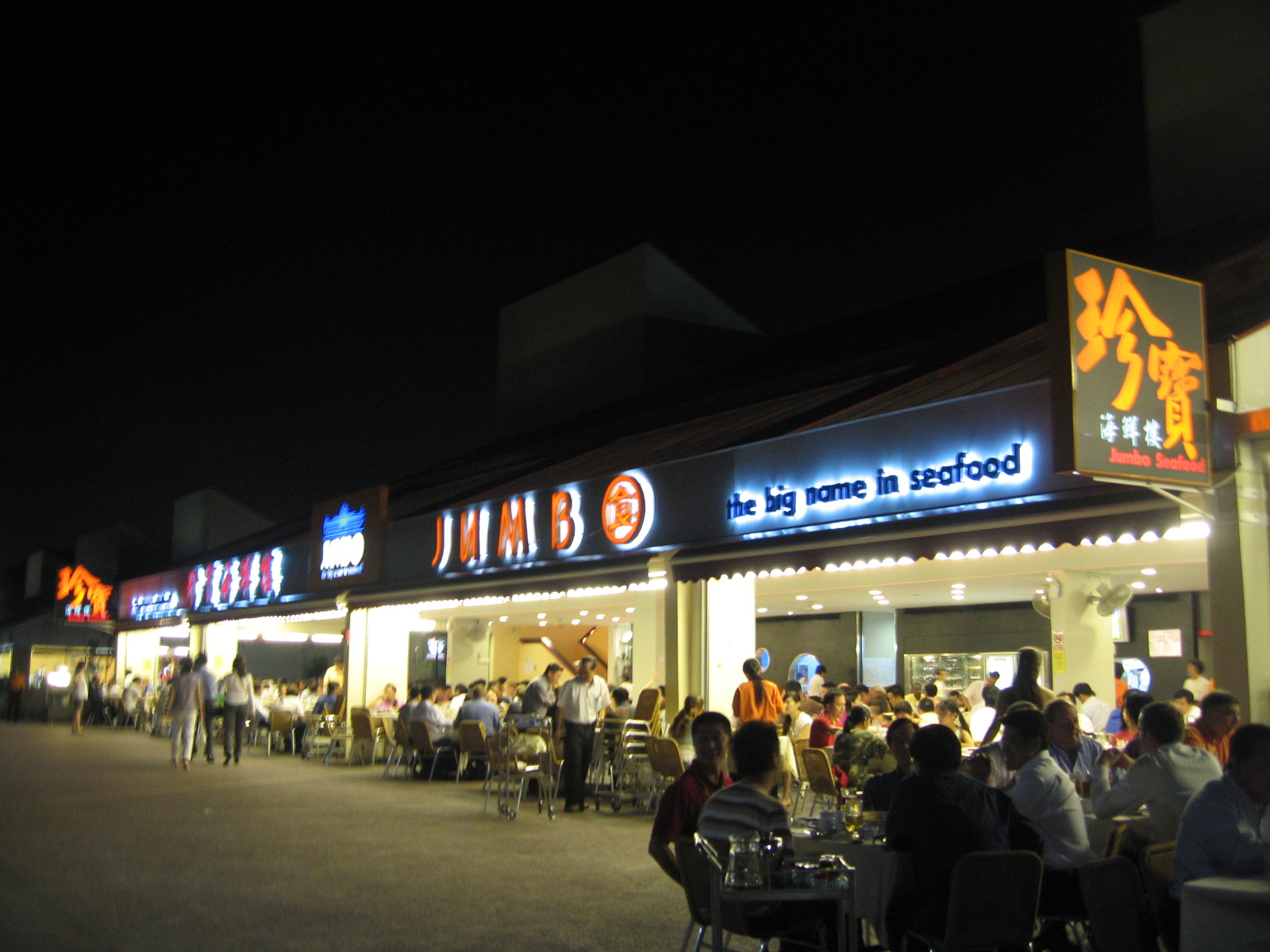
- Jumbo Seafood's main restaurant at the East Coast Seafood Centre in Singapore (2006)
- Industry: Restaurant
- Founded: 1987; 39 years ago in Singapore
- Headquarters: Singapore
- Area served: Domestic: Singapore; International: China, Vietnam, Taiwan
- Key people: Ang Kiam Meng (EC & Group CEO)
- Products: Seafood
- Website: www.jumboseafood.com.sg

Jumbo Seafood (Note: Chinese: 珍寶海鮮樓) is a Singaporean restaurant chain specialising in the seafood aspects of Singaporean cuisine and dishes, such as Chili crab. First opened in 1987 with an outlet at the East Coast Seafood Centre modeling and taking design elements similar to the non affiliated JUMBO Floating Restaurant Hong Kong, Jumbo Kingdom. It became a hit, it then opened an additional five outlets throughout the country including in the suburban areas of Serangoon Gardens as well as the Singapore Indoor Stadium. As of 2022, it has 5 outlets in Singapore.

Its famous dishes include JUMBO Chilli Crab and JUMBO Black Pepper Crab. The restaurant chain works in tandem with the Singapore Tourism Board (STB) to promote local dishes such as Chilli crab, Sotong Youtiao, Crispy Baby Squid and Sambal Kangkong, among others.

The JUMBO Group of Restaurants manages 22 outlets and has seven different dining concepts under its umbrella. Jumbo owns the Singaporean franchise of the Japanese ramen bar Yoshimaru at Holland Village. Other establishments include J-Pot, Ng Ah Sio Bak Kut Teh, J Cafe and Chui Huay Lim Teochew Cuisine. It also operates the Singapore Seafood Republic in collaboration with other seafood restaurants in Singapore. The JUMBO franchise has also expanded its operations beyond Singapore, including in mainland China, Vietnam and Taiwan.

== History ==
=== Early years ===
JUMBO Group of Restaurants originated from JUMBO Seafood, which was started by a group of friends taking inspiration from JUMBO Floating Restaurant Hong Kong, Jumbo Kingdom and "for the love of eating and seafood". Ang Kiam Meng who was an engineer by training, took over the business in 1993 and is the current Chief Executive of JUMBO Group of Restaurants. In the early days of JUMBO's operations, the company faced some challenges including the closure of its second East Coast outlet in 1995. The company also filed a proceeding against a floating restaurant named “Hong Kong JUMBO Seafood Restaurant” in Hong Kong due to the similarities to the JUMBO Seafood brand which created confusion among the general public. The case was won by JUMBO when they established that they had “built up goodwill on the name” since 1985.

=== Since 2000 ===
During the 2003 SARS outbreak in Singapore, when business was poor, staff were offered the option of taking pay cuts instead of being retrenched. In 2006, JUMBO revenue was $30 million, with their East Coast outlet being the most successful.

In 2006, as part of JUMBO Group's overseas expansion plans, its operations and processes were streamlined. A centralised kitchen was also set up in 2008 to ensure the consistency of the food quality across the various outlets and to facilitate the creation of new dishes. A food technology consultant was brought in to ensure that the Group's famed dish, Chilli Crab, could be replicated in the Group's overseas branch “without losing its flavour and texture” before the Group expanded overseas. Its first overseas restaurant opened in Shanghai, in November 2013. The centralised kitchen prepares the sauces and mixes to be delivered to the various outlets across Singapore. Located in Kaki Bukit and spanning 8,000 sq ft, the kitchen enabled the Group to cut down on work processes. The labour-saving initiative meant the company could expand with less new hires – including launching new establishments like Chui Huay Lim Teochew Cuisine, JPOT Hotpot Singapore Style, and YOSHIMARU ramen bar. Through R&D at the centrailised kitchen, the Group also started selling their Chilli Crab and “Black Pepper Crab Paste retail packs to consumers.

On 7 July 2013, the SingTel Hawker Heroes Challenge saw favourite local hawkers and celebrity chef, Gordan Ramsay, in a cook-off. The contest, which was held at Newton Food Centre, saw more than 1,000 members of the public who came to sample Chicken Rice, Laksa and Chili Crab prepared by Chef Ramsay and the hawkers. Three hawkers were chosen out of a group of 12 popular hawkers to take on Chef Ramsay through an online poll that sparked national interest. JUMBO participated as one of the hawkers. Members of the public voted for either the Singapore hawkers' or Ramsay's version of the local dishes. Of the three hawker dishes contested by Gordon Ramsay, JUMBO was the only one that lost to Gordon Ramsay, with its signature chili crab dish. Around 3,000 votes were received from the 1,000 people who turned up at the event.

While the words "珍宝海鲜" from the old logo remain, the new logo features a crab pincer with an outline of the Singapore map.

== Other establishments ==
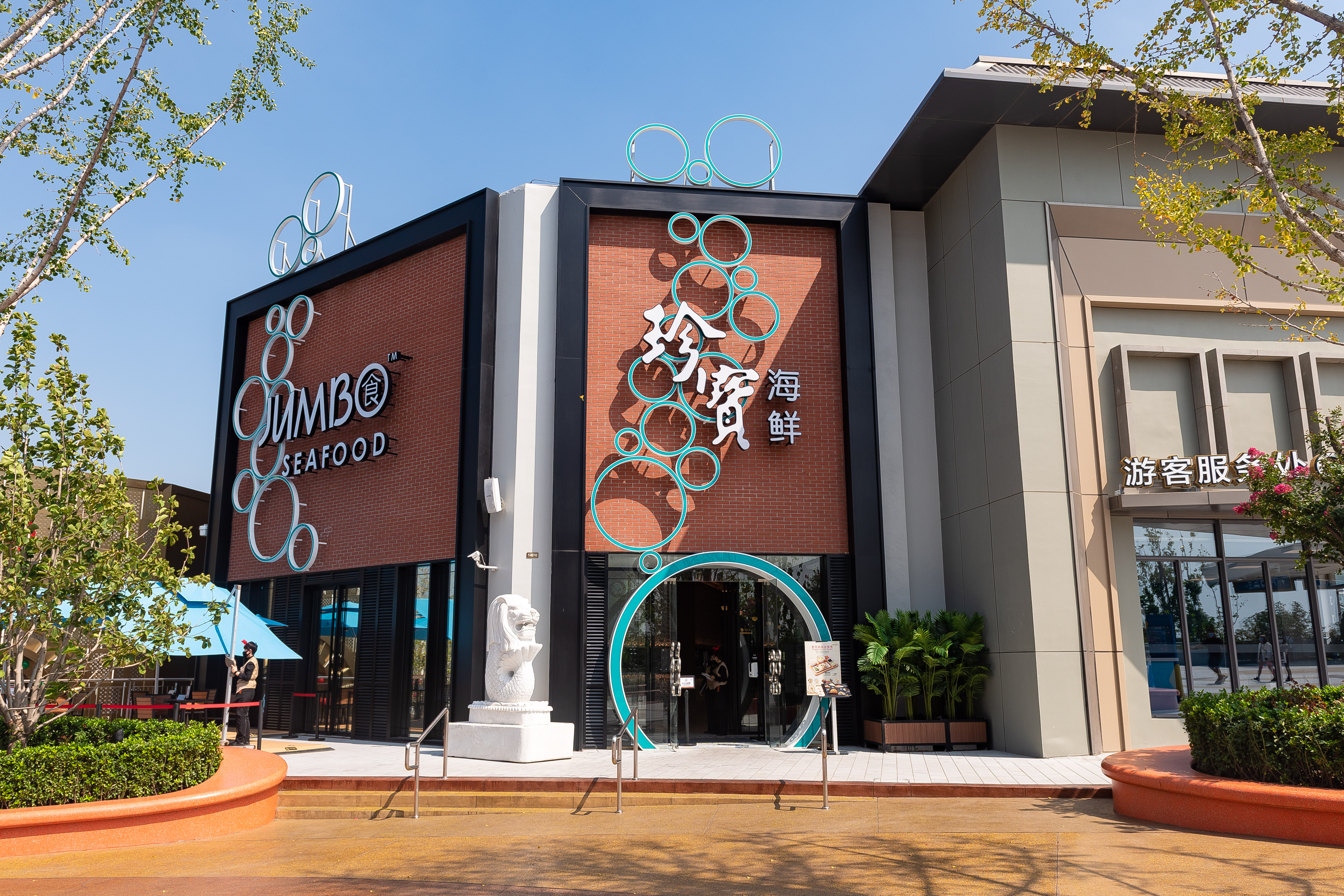
Jumbo Seafood restaurant at Universal CityWalk Beijing, Universal Beijing Resort, Tongzhou, Beijing, China

In addition to its chain of JUMBO Seafood restaurants, the Group has diversified into other brands.

=== JUMBO Seafood in IAPM Mall, Shanghai ===
JUMBO Group partnered with BreadTalk Group to open a 280-seat seafood restaurant in Shanghai. The restaurant is also among the first of the Group's to use the new JUMBO logo. The restaurant is located in Huahai Zhong Lu, a shopping district popular with tourists.

=== JPOT Hotpot Singapore Style ===
In 2009, the hotpot restaurant concept, JPOT, was introduced as part of the JUMBO Group, capitalising on the dining concept popularity in Singapore, particularly among “youths who gather in large groups”. The Group also pioneered the use of technology to increase productivity at their Tampines One outlet which has been replicated across other JPOT outlets.

=== NG AH SIO Bak Kut Teh ===
The brand dates back to the 1950s when it was first started by Mr Ng Mui Song who operated a pushcart stall in the River Valley area catering to labourers. In 1977, Ng Mui Song's son, Ng Ah Sio, moved to a stall in New World Amusement Park and worked out a new recipe, enhancing the pepper taste. The brand was eventually taken over by the JUMBO Group in 2010. After realising that many of its customers travelled long distances to its outlet at Rangoon Road, the Group opened an Ng Ah Sio Bak Kut Teh outlet at Tanjong Katong, showing its commitment to customer convenience and accessibility. The Katong outlet also opted to reflect the area's Peranakan heritage with custom tile designs in a restored shophouse. Today it has 4 outlets.

=== Chui Huay Lim Teochew Cuisine ===
Chui Huay Lim Teochew Cuisine first opened in early 2012. Among the restaurant's popular favourites are its Steamed Pomfret and Teochew Cold Crab.

=== YOSHIMARU ramen bar ===
Observing that “the Japanese food culture is popular in Singapore”, the JUMBO Group brought in YOSHIMARU ramen bar serving Hakata-style ramen with Tonkotsu (pork bone) broth.

=== Singapore Seafood Republic ===
In April 2008, JUMBO embarked on a US$3 million venture with Japanese partner Maruha Restaurant Systems and opened the first Singapore Seafood Republic restaurant in Shinagawa, Tokyo. The 250-seat restaurant serves Singapore-style dishes, including the restaurant's signature crabs. The brand currently has four outlets that feature many dishes highlighting Singapore's food heritage and in less than a month after its opening, it served over one tonne of mud crabs.

=== Slake ===
In December 2021, Slake, an eatery formerly located at Opera Estate, Singapore was added to the group. Slake took over a Jumbo Seafood outlet located at The Riverwalk.

== Partnerships and philanthropy ==
JUMBO has partnered with the Singapore Institute of Technology and the University of Nevada, Las Vegas to offer scholarships for students majoring in Hospitality Management.

The JUMBO Group also supports various education and community welfare initiatives:

After the 2011 Japan earthquake and tsunami, the JUMBO Group helped to raise a total of S$45,063.65 for Mercy Relief's Earthquake & Tsunami Relief Fund, through fund-raising activities

== See also ==
- List of seafood restaurants
