= Black pepper crab =

Singaporean dish consisting of crab fried with black pepper

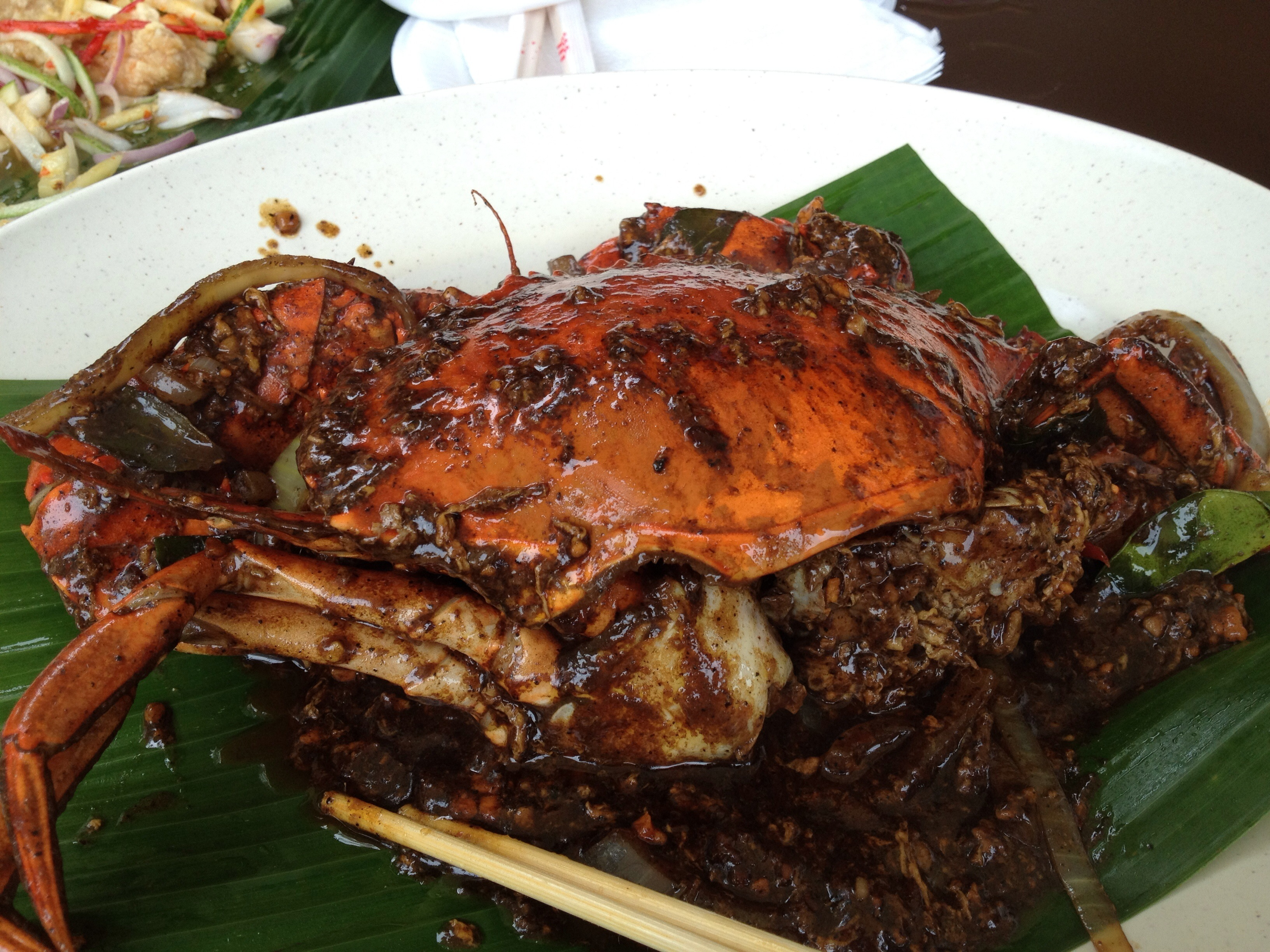
- Black pepper crab
- Course: Main course
- Place of origin: Singapore
- Serving temperature: Hot temperature
- Main ingredients: Crab, black pepper seasoning

Black pepper crab is one of the popular ways that crab is served in Singaporean cuisine. It is made by frying hard-shell crabs with black pepper. Unlike the other popular chilli crab dish, it is not cooked in a sauce and therefore has a dry consistency.

== See also ==
- Chilli crab
- Crab in Padang sauce
- List of crab dishes
- Oyster sauce crab
