= Heladería Coromoto =

Ice cream shop in Venezuela

Coordinates: 8.59436°N 71.14871°W

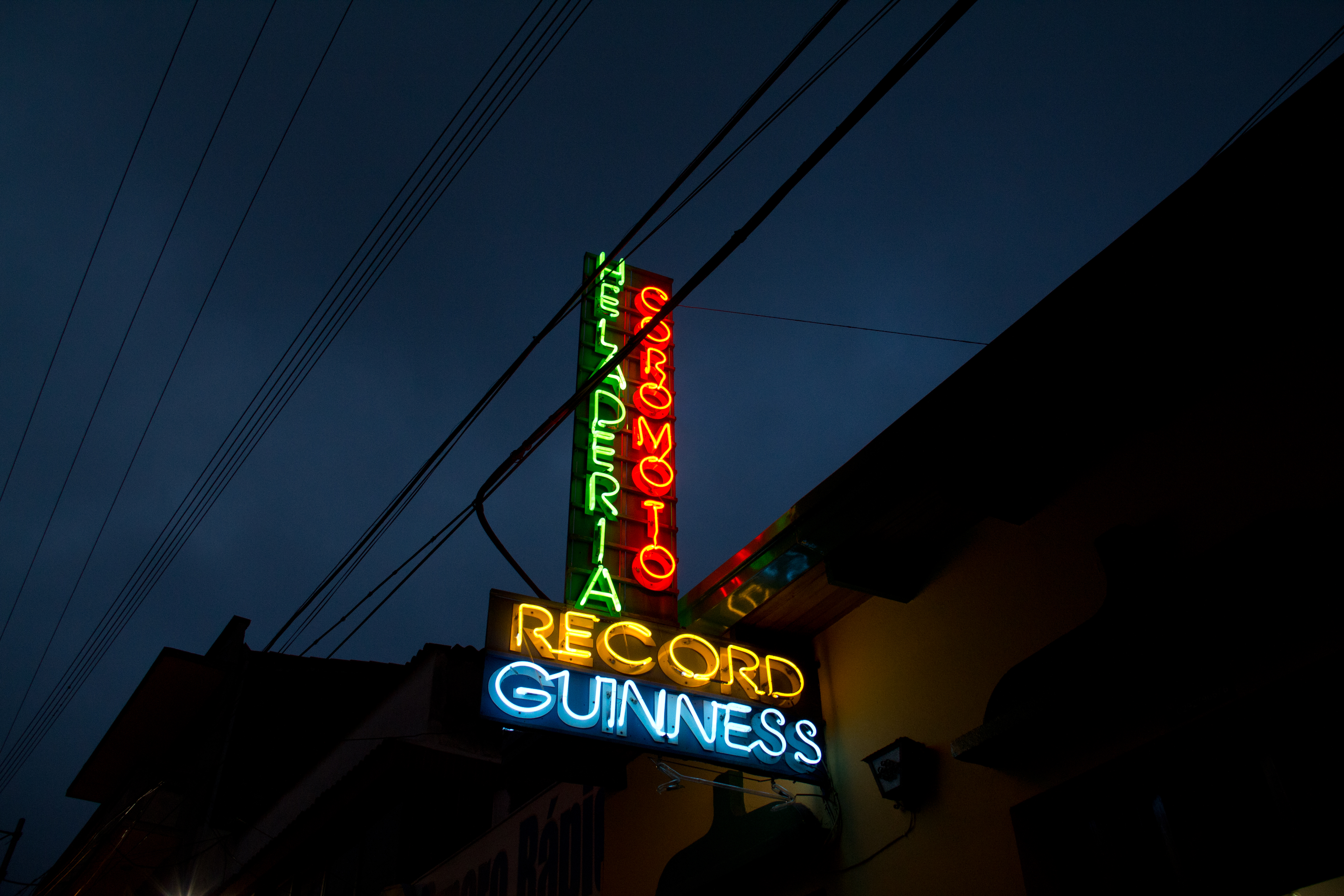
Neon sign at Heladería Coromoto.

Heladería Coromoto, commonly known as Coromoto, is an ice cream parlor in Merida, Venezuela, known for offering 860 flavors, a former Guinness World Record. However, it was topped by a record of 985 ice cream flavors by Matt and Mike Casarez of Migg and Mutts Craft Creamery in Black Hawk, Colorado, USA on July 17, 2011. Coromoto was established by Manuel da Silva Oliveira, who began his ice cream career at well-established ice cream firms, before founding the store in a bid to create more appealing ice cream flavors. Coromoto sells 60 different ice cream flavors in accordance with factors such as the weather. Lonely Planet Venezuela calls Coromoto a popular tourist destination.

== History ==
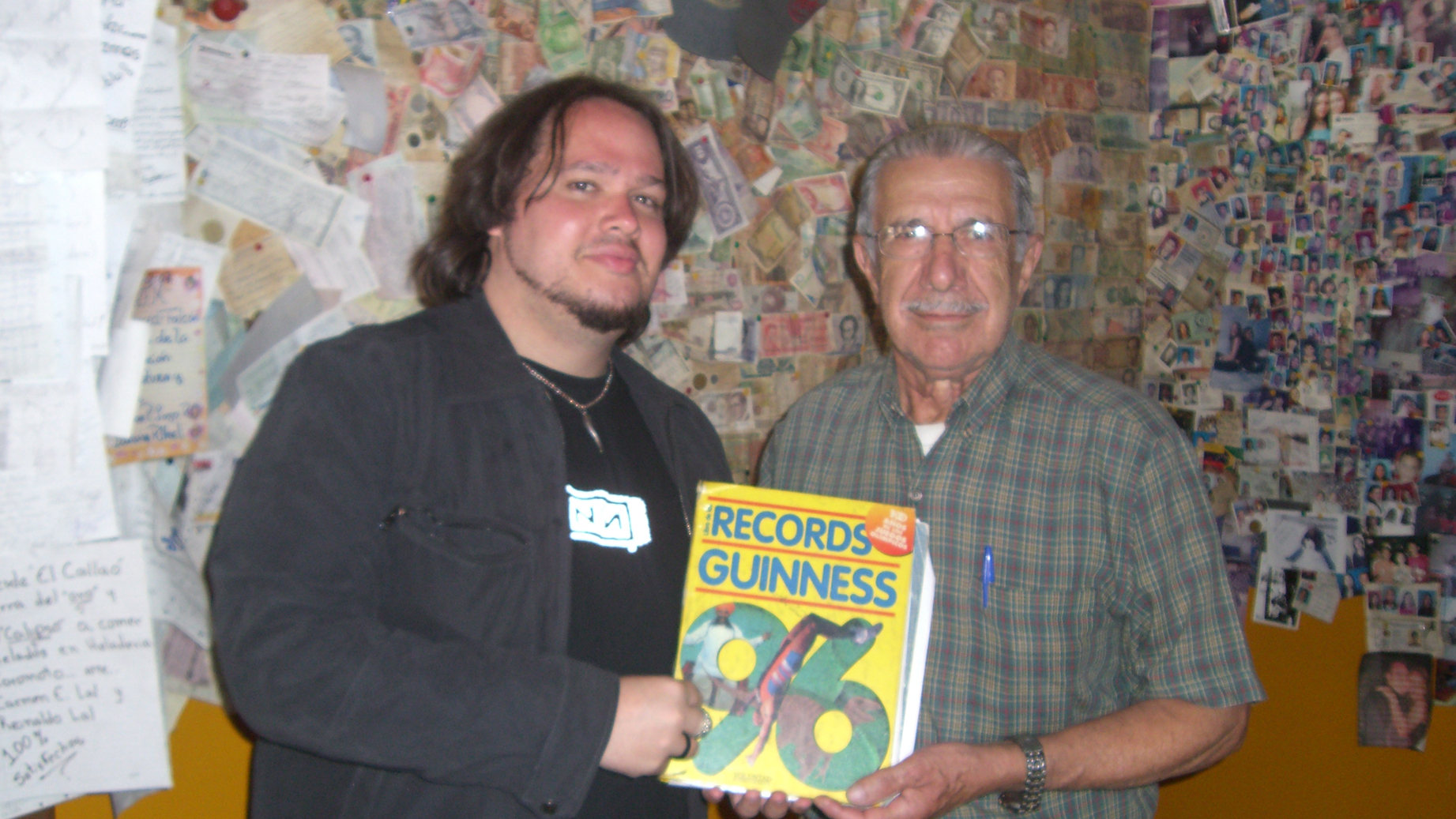
Manuel da Silva Oliveira (right), founder of Heladería Coromoto, with Guinness Book, 1996 issue, with a visitor at the shop in 2008.

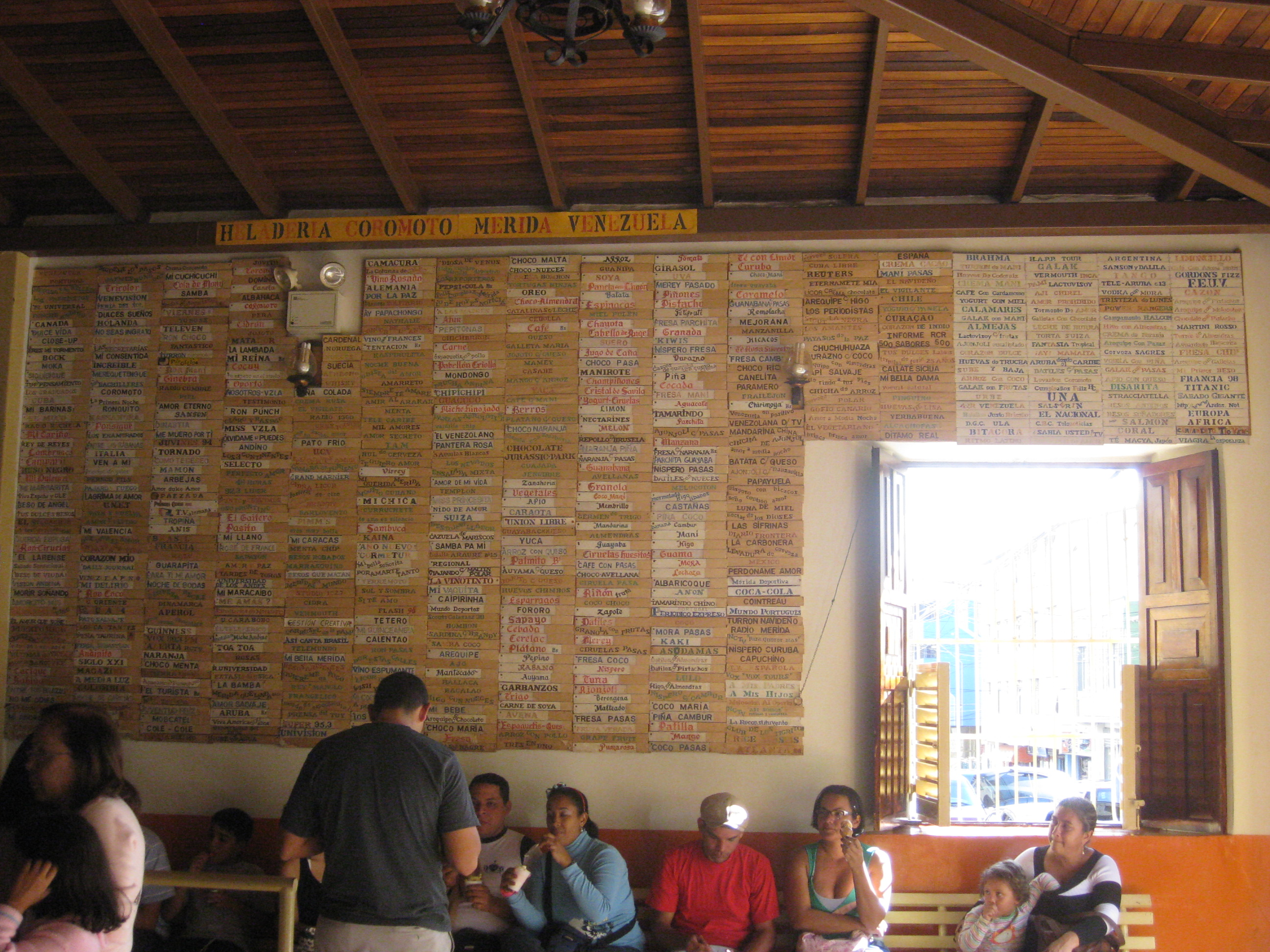
Full range of Heladería Coromoto's ice-cream flavours in 2006.

Heladería Coromoto was founded in 1980 or 1981 by Manuel da Silva Oliveira, an immigrant from Portugal. Prior to that, Oliveira served as a worker for "the big ice-cream companies". Wanting to create ice cream flavors that would appeal more to consumers, he broke out and started Coromoto. The parlor started out with four common flavors, vanilla, strawberry, chocolate, and coconut, however when its avocado flavor, launched for its novelty value, became a hit, he started experimenting. By the time, he created flavor No. 593 called "Chipi Chipi", after its ingredient a saltwater shellfish, the Guinness Book incorporated his name in their book. In 2006, the shop opened its first franchise, "Coromoto" at Portimão on the southern coast of Portugal and 185 miles south of capital Lisbon. It is opened by his eldest son, also named Manuel Da Silva Oliveira, and Oliveira thereafter divides his time between Venezuela and Portugal.

For unknown reasons, Oliveira no longer patrons the store; Jose Ramirez manages the store.

== Products ==
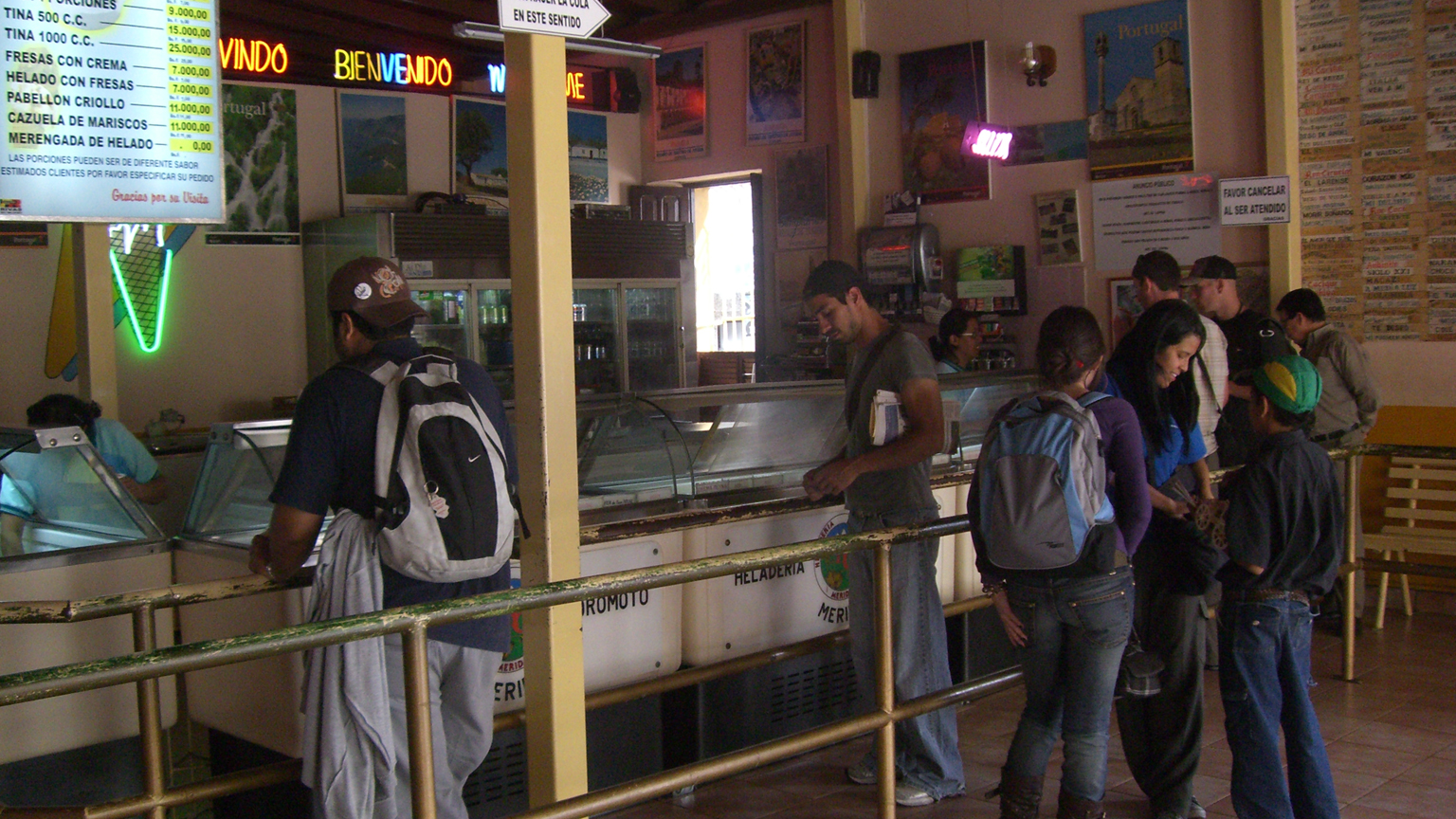
Inside Heladería Coromoto.

Coromoto is known for offering 860 ice cream flavors, although only around 60 to 75, are sold each day. Among others, the store sells garlic ice cream and chili ice cream, as well as quirkier-sounding flavors such as "British Airways" and "Viagra Hope". The unofficial world record of flavors permanently available in the shop belongs to Fenocchio i Nice in France. His shop has 94 flavors permanently in the shop.

== Operations ==
Coromoto is located in Merida, Venezuela, and operates Tuesday through Sunday from a one-level building across from a church. Lonely Planet Venezuela calls Coromoto "the most famous ice cream parlor in South America" and Frommer's calls it one of Merida's "chief tourist draws".
