= Oyster sauce =

Condiment made by cooking oysters

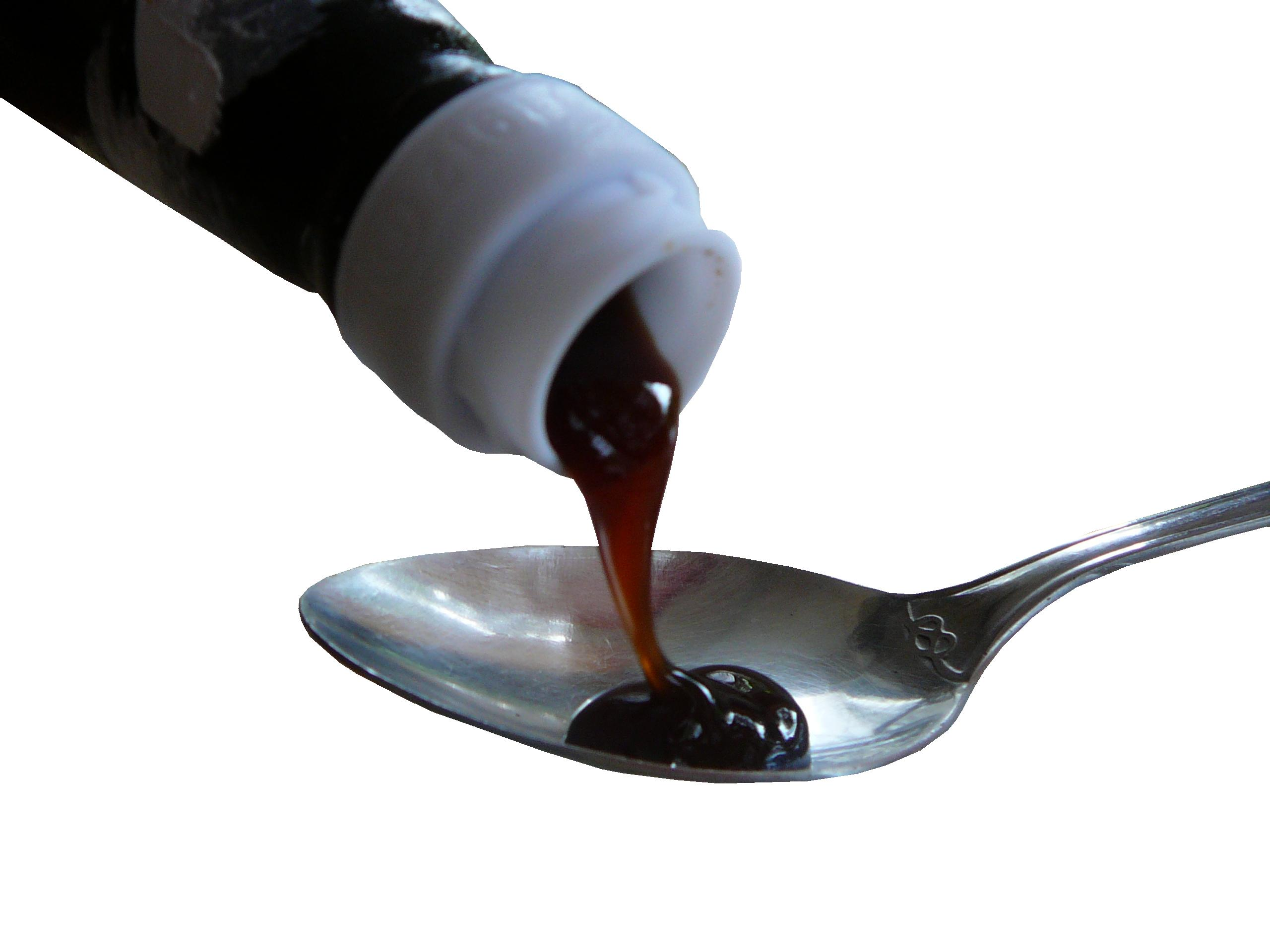

Chinese name
- Traditional Chinese: 蠔油
- Simplified Chinese: 蚝油
- Literal meaning: oyster oil/liquid
Transcriptions
Standard Mandarin
- Hanyu Pinyin: háo yóu
Yue: Cantonese
- Yale Romanization: hòuh yàuh
- Jyutping: hou4 jau4

Alternative Chinese name
- Traditional Chinese: 蚵油
Transcriptions
Southern Min
- Hokkien POJ: ô-iû

Vietnamese name
- Vietnamese alphabet: dầu hào dầu hàu
- Hán-Nôm: 油蠔

Thai name
- Thai: ซอสหอยนางรม
- RTGS: sot-hoi-nang-rom

Malay name
- Malay: sos tiram

Indonesian name
- Indonesian: saus tiram

Khmer name
- Khmer: ទឹកប្រេងខ្យង (tɨk preeng khyɑɑng)

Oyster sauce describes a number of sauces made by cooking oysters. The most common in modern use is a viscous dark brown condiment made from oyster extracts, sugar, salt and water, thickened with corn starch (though original oyster sauce reduced the unrefined sugar through heating, resulting in a naturally thick sauce due to caramelization, not the addition of corn starch).

Today, some commercial versions are darkened with caramel, though high-quality oyster sauce is naturally dark. It is commonly used in Chinese, Thai, Indonesian, Malay, Vietnamese, and Khmer cuisine.

== Production ==
Oyster sauce production began in China no later than the mid-1870s. Oysters were boiled in three iron basins for half an hour, then removed for drying on rattan either by sun or over a moderate fire. The water from the basins was reduced in a fourth basin to "a blackish sauce". Seawater, salt and/or soy could be added.

Today, most oyster sauce is produced commercially on automated production lines. Many shortcuts have been made to create a similar flavor more quickly and at reduced cost. Oyster sauces today are usually made with a base of sugar and salt and thickened with corn starch. Oyster extracts or essences are then used to give flavor to the base sauce. Other ingredients, such as soy sauce and monosodium glutamate, may also be added to deepen the flavor and add color. The quality of the oyster sauce will greatly affect the flavor.

== Culinary use ==
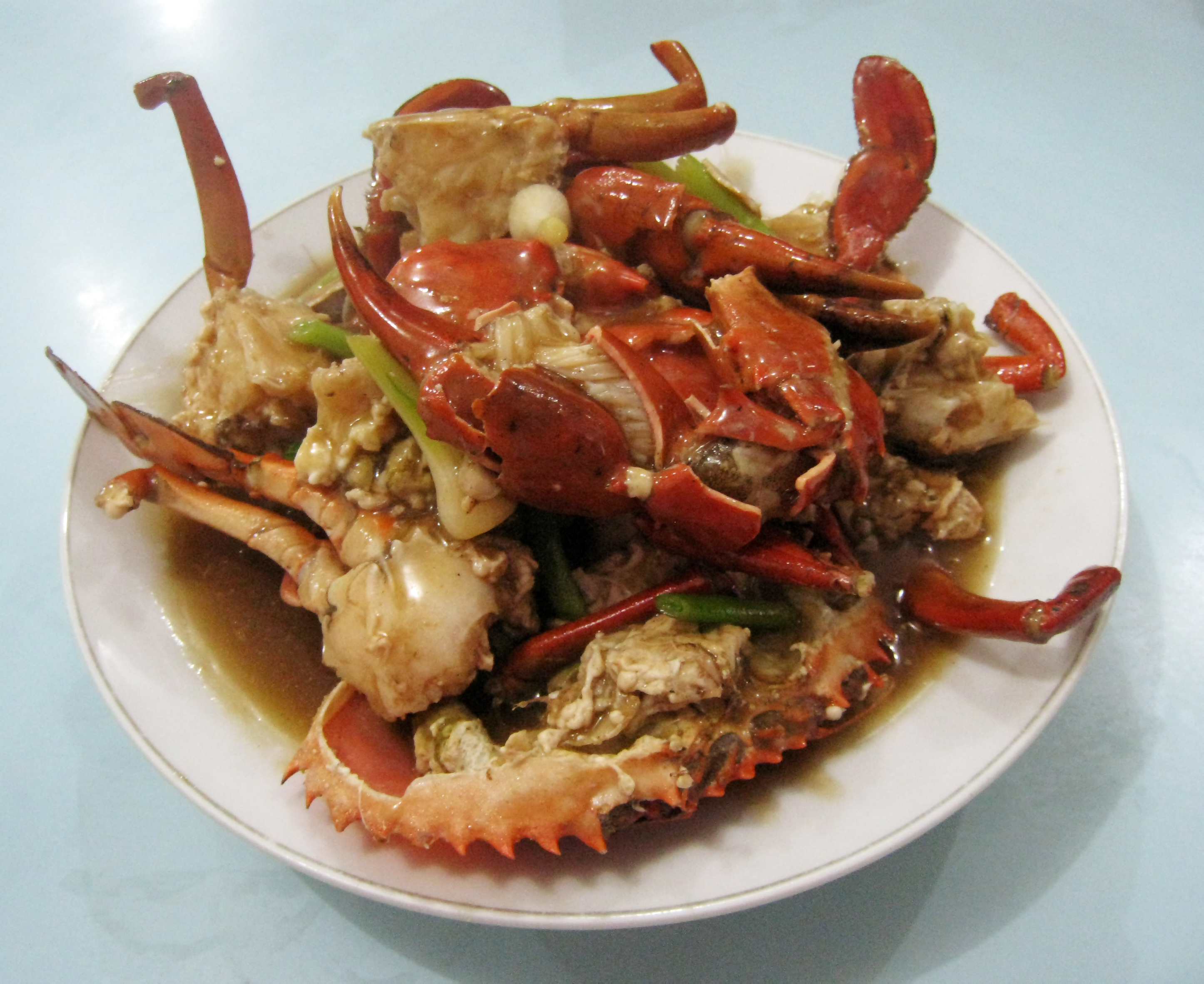
Kepiting saus tiram, Chinese-Indonesian crab in oyster sauce

Oyster sauce adds a savory flavor to many meat and vegetable dishes. The sauce is a staple for much Chinese family-style cooking. It is commonly used in noodle stir-fries, such as chow mein. It is also found in popular Chinese-American dishes such as beef with stir-fried vegetables. Oyster sauce can also be used as a topping for some dishes.

Since its early stage of development, oyster sauce has been widely popular with Cantonese chefs as an umami rich condiment.

Oyster sauce is also used in Shandong, Sichuan, Jiangsu and Zhejiang cuisines.

Dishes that may use oyster sauce include crab in oyster sauce, kai-lan, Buddha's delight, Hainanese chicken rice, cashew chicken, lo mein, cha siu baau, har gow, kai yat sai, wonton noodles, and daikon cake.

== Difference from fish sauce ==
While oyster sauce and fish sauce are both briny and may have related histories, they are different products. Fish sauce is watery, clear, and salty, whereas oyster sauce is made by reducing oyster extracts and therefore sweeter with a hint of salt and not as strong an aroma as fish sauce.

== Varieties ==
"True" oyster sauce of good quality should be made by condensing oyster extracts, the white broth produced by boiling oysters in water. This opaque broth, similar to the color of clam juice found in supermarkets, is then reduced until a desired viscosity has been reached and the liquid has caramelized to a brown color. No other additives, not even salt, should be added to the sauce, since the oysters should provide all the savory flavor. However, this method is prohibitively expensive.

Many modern oyster sauces are thickened with cornstarch, flavored with oyster essence or extract and darkened with caramel.

=== Vegetarian oyster sauce ===
Vegetarian oyster sauce prepared from mushrooms, often oyster mushrooms or shiitake mushrooms, is also popular and generally lower in price. It may contain more taste enhancers if less mushroom extract is used to reduce costs.

=== Non-MSG oyster sauce ===
Most of the oyster sauces available on the market contain added monosodium glutamate (MSG). In recent years, MSG-free varieties have been made more available.

== European oyster sauce ==
In 19th-century French and English cooking, "oyster sauce" referred to a variant of sauce blanche flavored with oysters, using a base of milk and melted butter rather than purely reducing the oysters by cooking. Mrs Beeton's Household Management included a variant. The white sauce version was moistened with cream, whereas in brown oyster sauce, the cream was replaced with gravy. Common recipes using the sauce included "Steak and oyster sauce", documented as early as 1806, and "Cod and oyster sauce".

== Health issues ==
In 2001, the United Kingdom Food Standards Agency found in tests of various oyster sauces and soy sauces that 22% of samples contained 3-MCPD (3-monochloropropane-1,2-diol) at levels considerably higher than those deemed safe by the European Union. About two-thirds of these samples also contained a second chemical, called 1,3-DCP (1,3-dichloropropanol), which experts advise should not be present at any levels in food. Both chemicals have the potential to cause cancer, and the Agency recommended that the affected products be withdrawn from shelves and avoided.

The joint Australia New Zealand Food Authority (ANZFA) said it had taken emergency action to amend its food standards code to set a limit for 3-MCPD in soy sauce of 0.02 milligrams per kilogram, in line with European Commission standards that came into force in the EU in April 2002.

== See also ==
- List of Chinese sauces
- List of sauces
