= Chilli crab =

Southeast Asian seafood dish

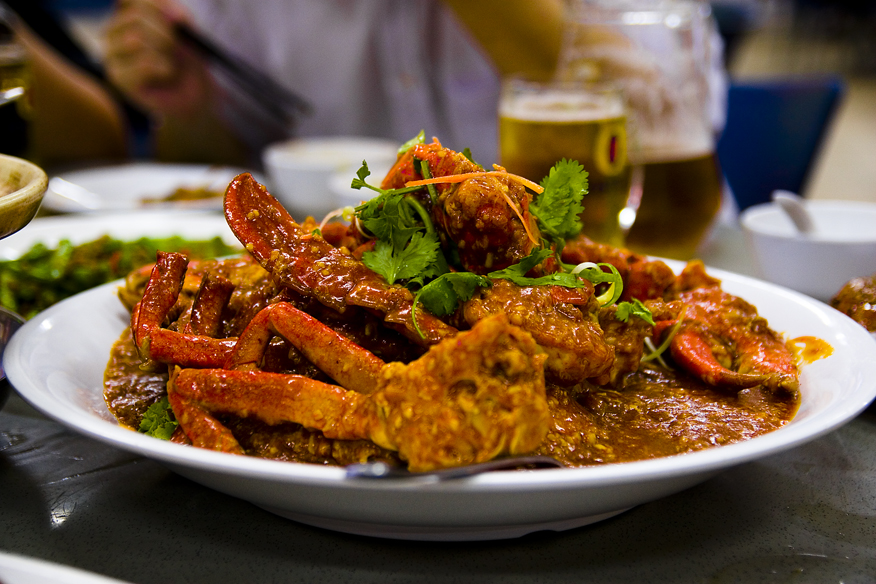
- A plate of chilli crab
- Type: Seafood
- Place of origin: Malaysia, Singapore
- Associated cuisine: Malaysia, Singapore
- Created by: Cher Yam Tian (Singapore's version)
- Serving temperature: Hot, with a side of mantou
- Main ingredients: Crab, chilli, egg
- Variations: Black pepper crab

Chilli crab (Chinese: 辣椒螃蟹; pinyin: làjiāo pángxiè; Malay: ketam cabai, ketam cili) is a Southeast Asian seafood dish popular in Malaysian and Singaporean cuisines. The modern version of the dish originated in the region in the 1950s. It is typically prepared by stir-frying mud crabs in sweet and savoury, semi-thick sauce made primarily from tomatoes and chilli peppers.

== Origins ==
The Portuguese introduced chilli peppers to Malacca in the 16th century. Before their introduction, Malays used peppercorn to add heat and spice to their food. A related dish, ketam balado, is a drier crab dish prepared with balado, a spicy mixture originating in the Minangkabau cuisine of West Sumatra, Indonesia. (Note: As cited from the article, '“ketam balado”, cooked Minangkabau-style by MasterChef Malaysia contestant Rosemah Ibrahim. (Balado is a spice mixture in Minang cuisine from West Sumatra that is eaten with all kinds of protein.) Ketam balado has been around for generations'.)

=== 20th century ===
In the 1950s, Cher Yam Tian experimented with stir-frying crabs caught by her husband, Lim Choon Ngee, and developed the dish by combining tomato sauce with chilli. In 1956, the couple started selling the dish from a pushcart along the Kallang River. After the dish turned out to be popular, they opened Palm Beach Seafood along Upper East Coast Road in 1963.

The modern version of chilli crab is attibuted to Hooi Kok Wai, one of Singapore's four famous chefs, who developed his recipe in the 1960s. He created a more complex sauce incorporating lemon juice, vinegar, sambal, tomato paste, and egg whites to produce a thicker, tangier gravy.

== Description ==
Chilli crab sauce is described as "sensuous" and "sweet, yet savoury", with a "fluffy texture". Mud crabs (Scylla serrata) are the most common type of crabs used for the dish, although other species of crab can also be used. It is usually served with a side of either fried or steamed mantou buns, which are used to scoop up the sauce.

== Cultural impact ==
CNN Go listed chilli crab as one of the "world's 50 most delicious foods", at Number 35. The Michelin Guide website dedicates a page to chilli crab.

The Amazing Race 25, The Amazing Race Asia 4, and The Amazing Race China 4 each featured a task that required contestants to crack a specified amount of chilli crabs. Chilli crab was also featured on the Netflix TV series Street Food in season 1.

Ketam berlada has been recognized as Malaysia's Intangible Cultural Heritage in 2009.

== See also ==
- Black pepper crab
- List of crab dishes
- List of seafood dishes
- Oyster sauce crab
- Crab in Padang sauce
