= List of seafood dishes =

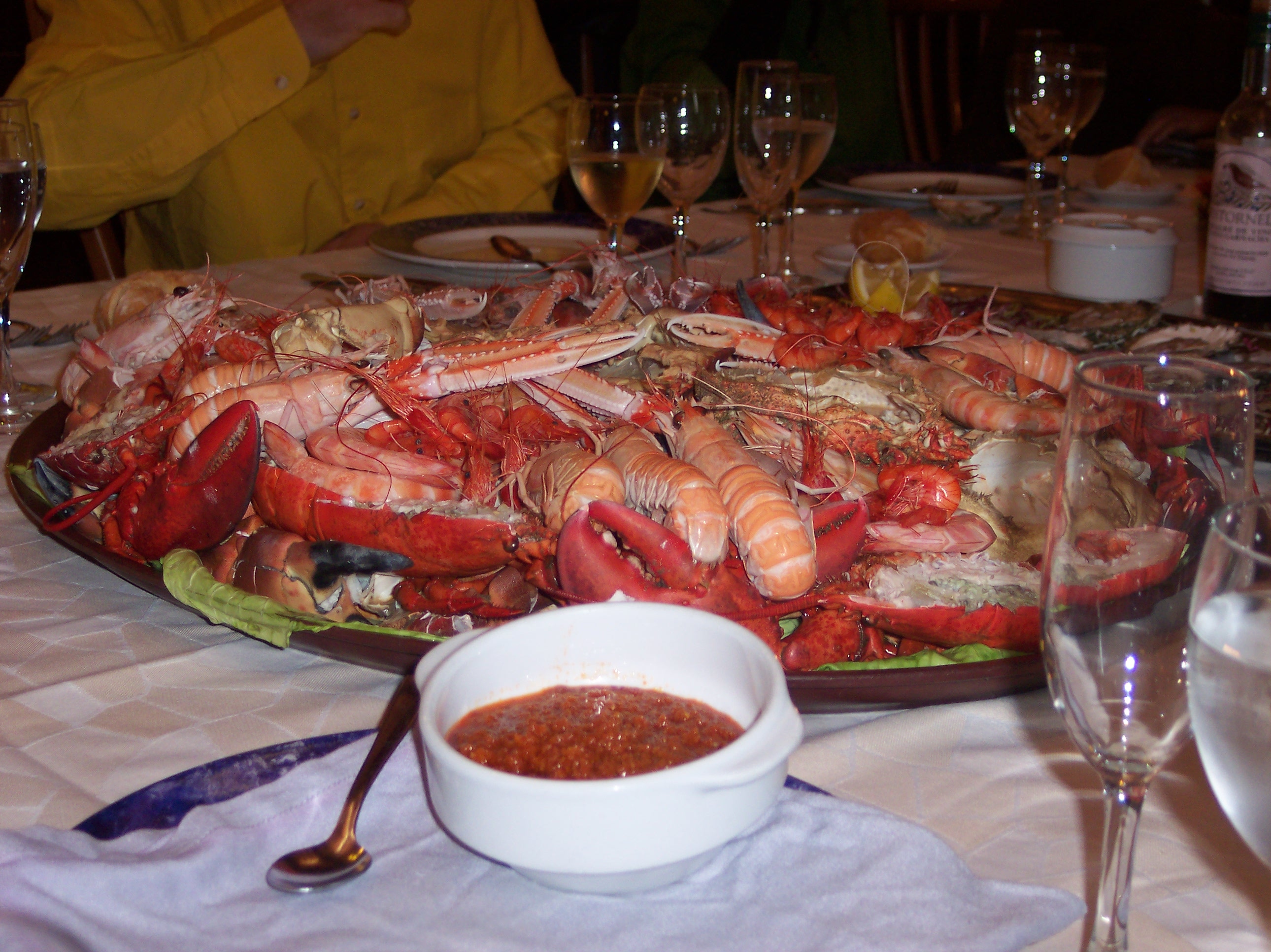
Plateau de fruits de mer (French 'seafood platter') is a seafood dish of raw and cooked shellfish served cold on a platter, usually on a bed of ice.

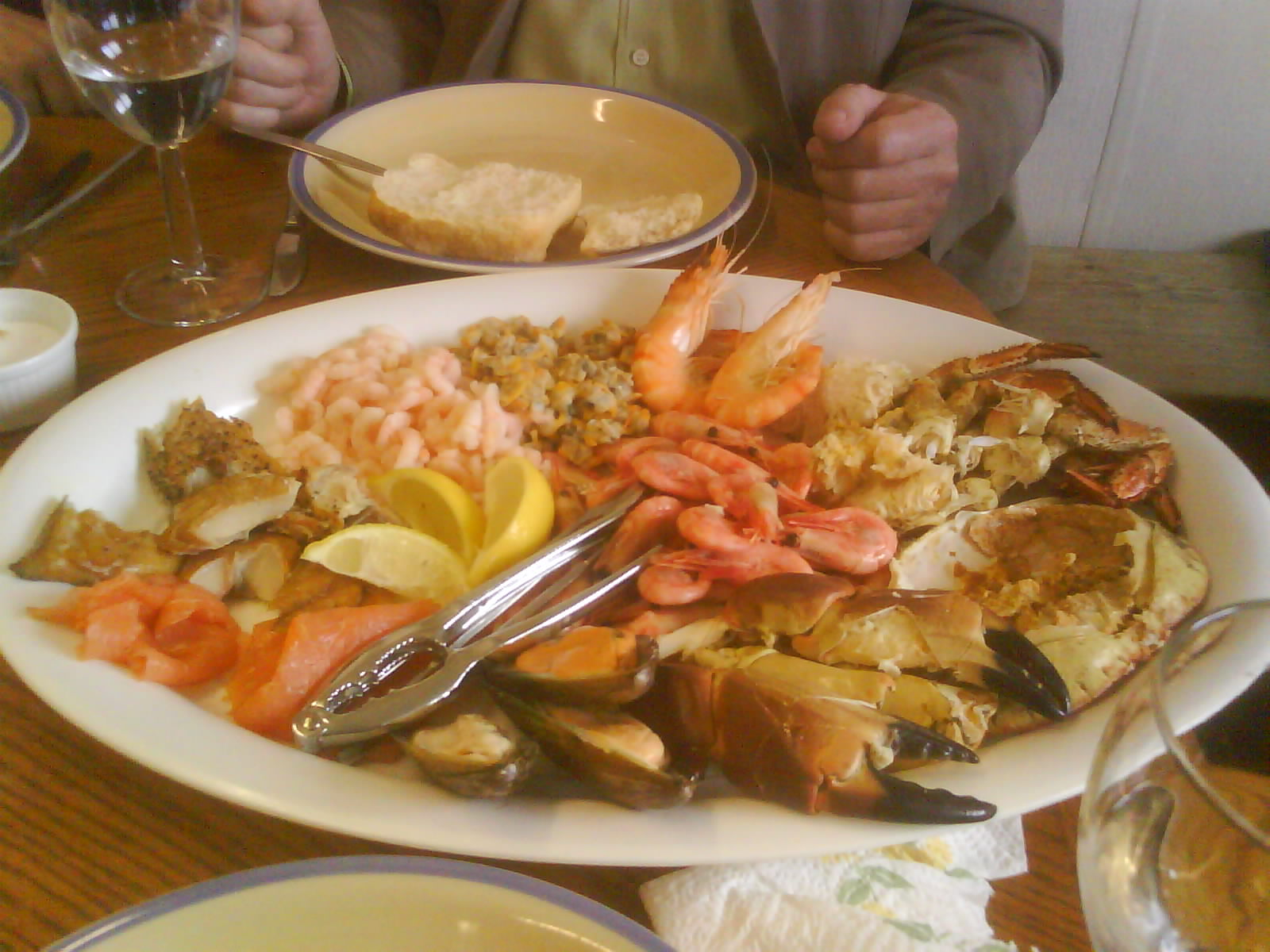
Seafood on a platter

Seafood dishes are food dishes which use seafood (fish, shellfish or seaweed) as primary ingredients, and are ready to be served or eaten with any needed preparation or cooking completed. Many fish or seafood dishes have a specific name (cioppino), while others are simply described (fried fish) or named for particular places (Cullen skink). Bisques are prepared with a variety of seafoods.

== Seafood dishes ==
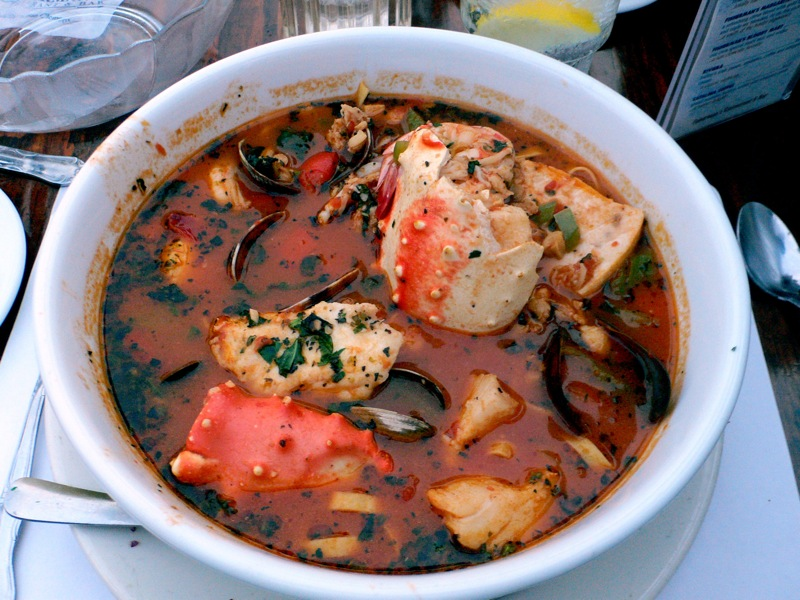
Cioppino is a fish stew originating in San Francisco.

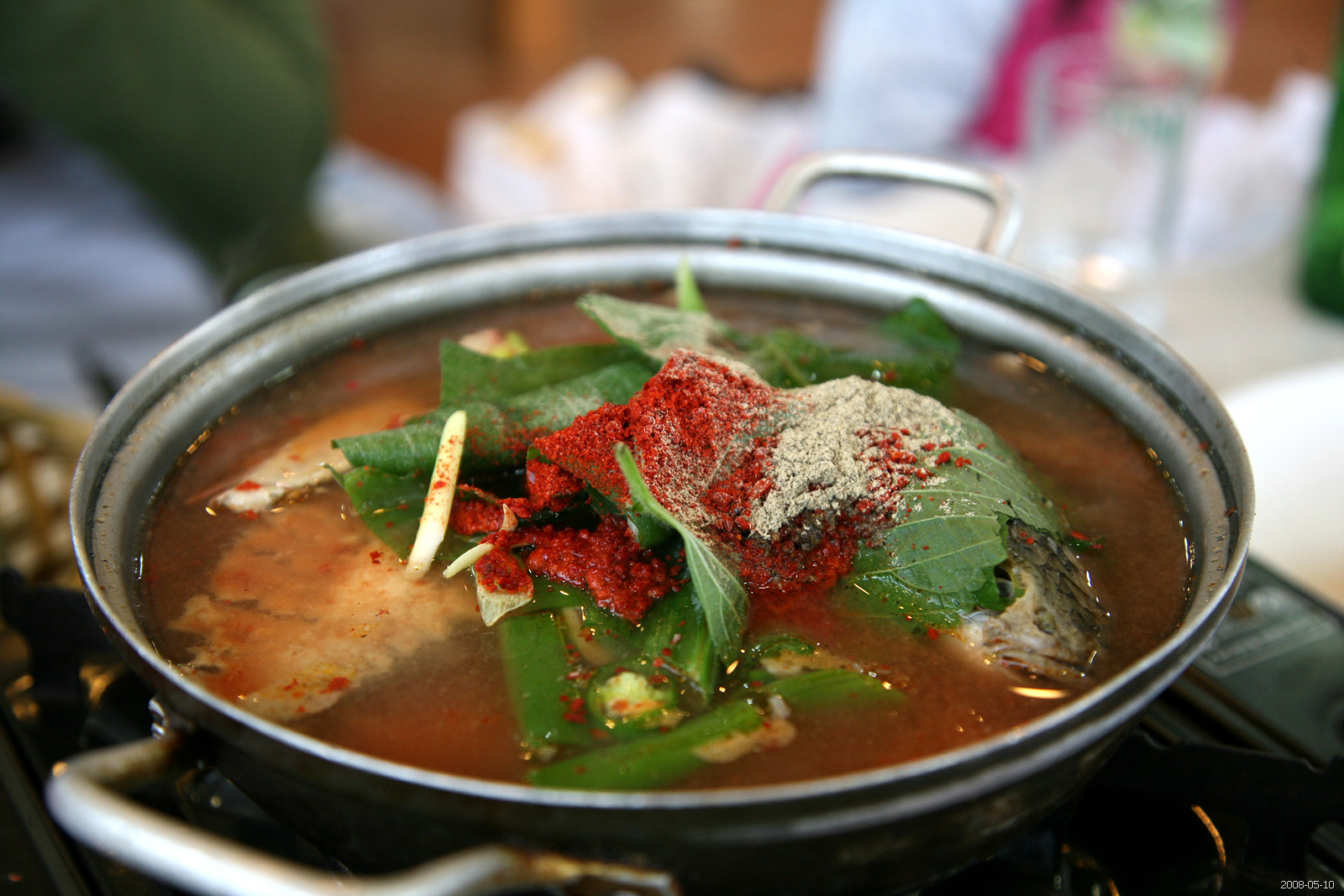
Maeuntang is a hot spicy Korean cuisine fish soup boiled with gochujang (Korean red chili pepper paste), kochukaru (chili powder), and various vegetables.

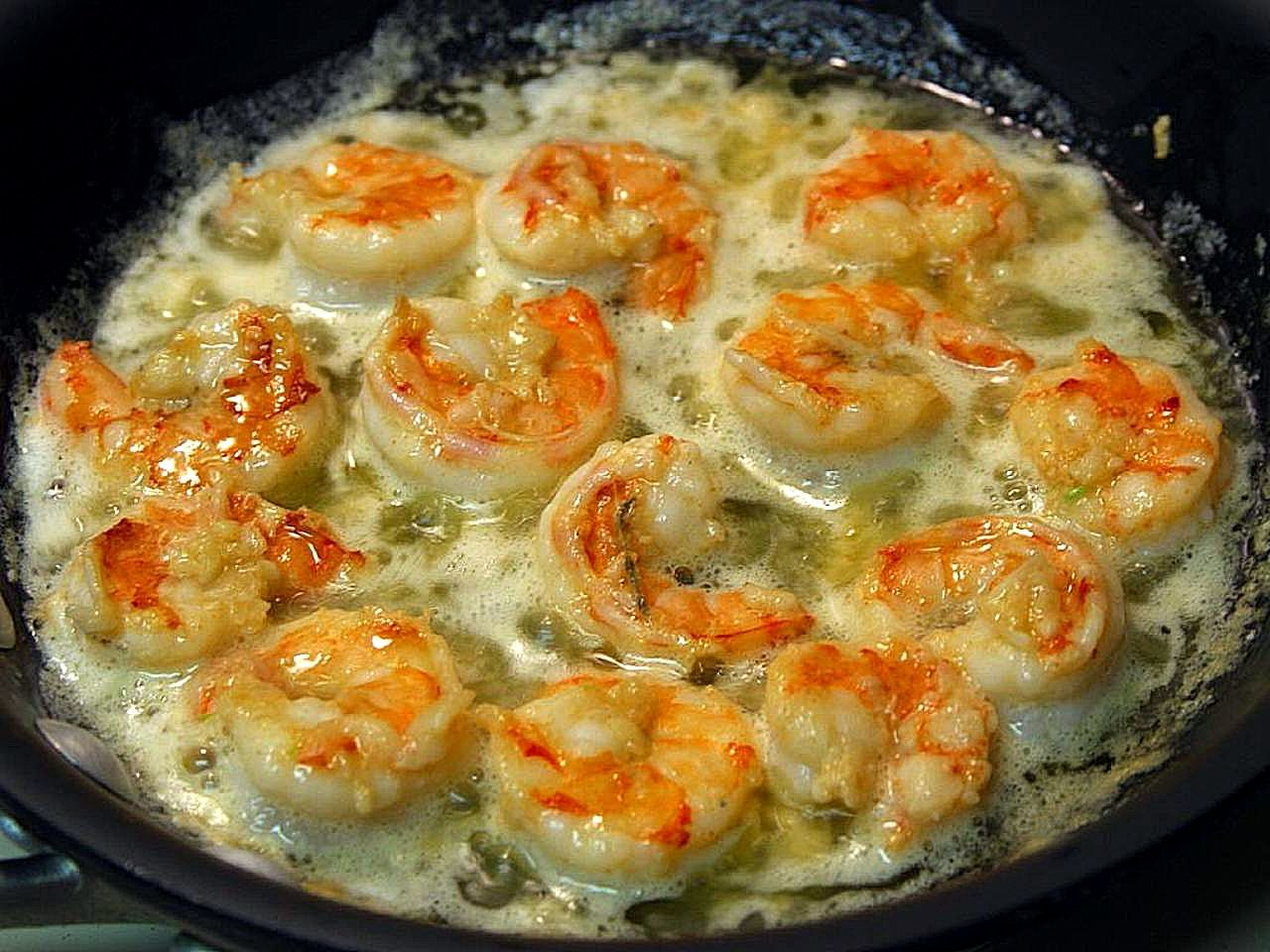
Shrimp scampi

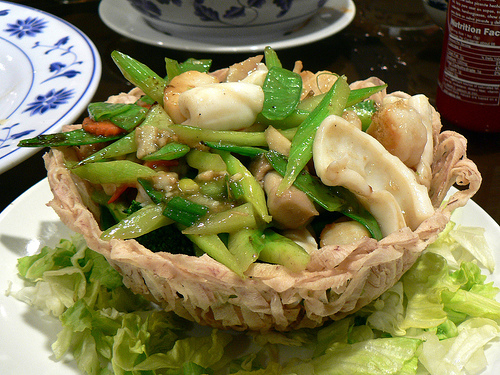
A seafood birdsnest

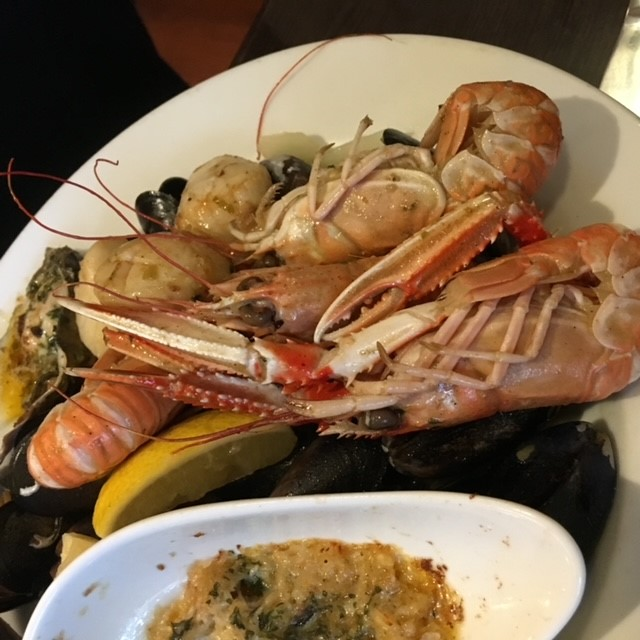
Scottish prawns in a platter

=== Mixed seafood dishes ===
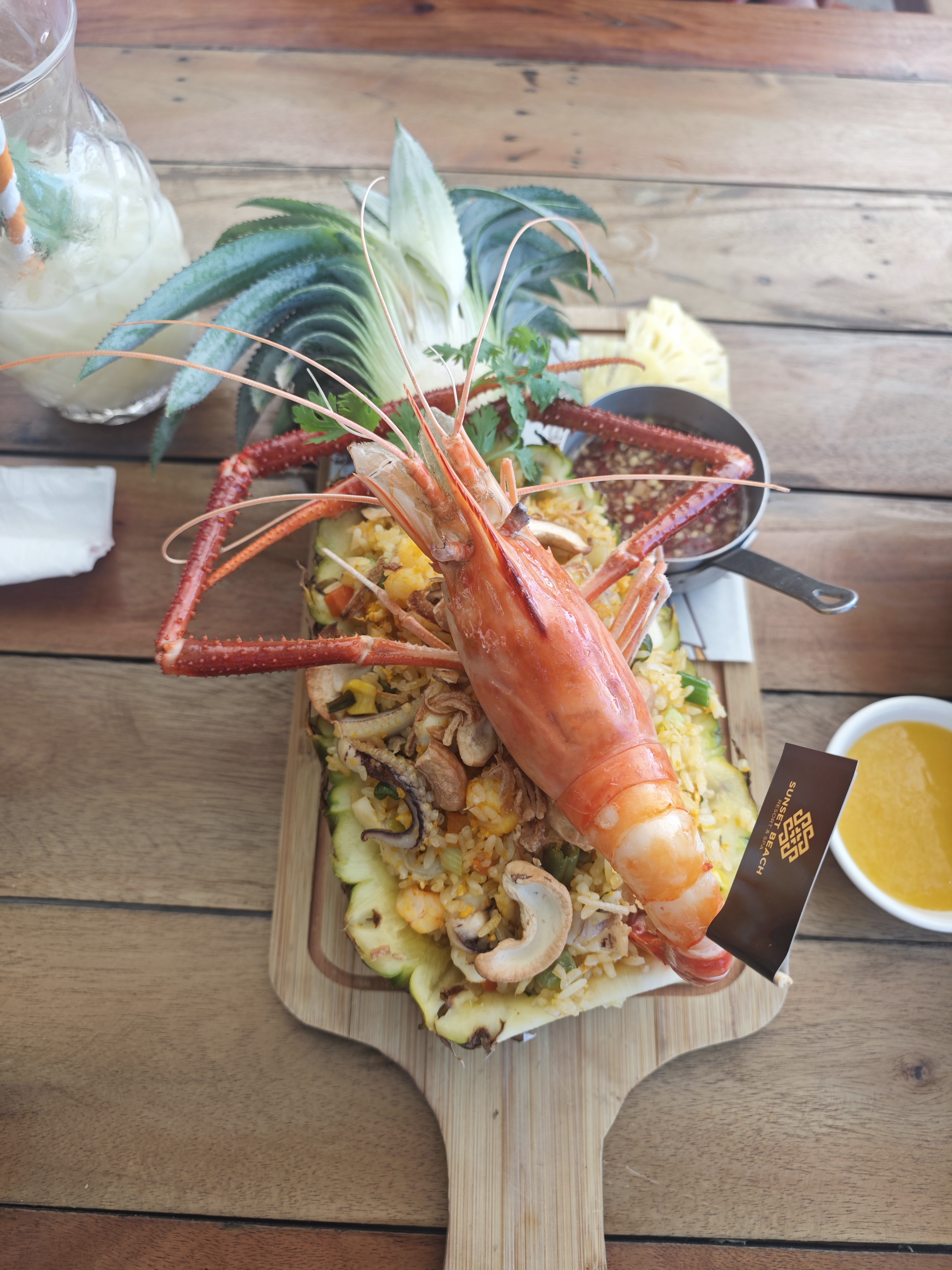
Seafood fried rice in pineapple

- Baik kut kyee kaik – Burmese fried noodle dish with squid and prawn
- Bánh canh – Vietnamese soup with thick rice noodles including crab, prawn, fish cake, or shrimp
- Bisque – Cream-based soup of French origin, made from crustaceans
- Bún mắm – Vietnamese vermicelli soup, with shrimp, shrimp paste, or fish paste
- Bún riêu – Traditional Vietnamese soup, with fish, crab, or snail
- Ceviche – Latin American dish of marinated raw seafood
- Chowder – Category of soups
- Cioppino – Fish stew originating in San Francisco, with Dungeness crab, clam, mussels, squid, scallops, shrimp, and/or fish
- Crawfish pie – Louisiana dish
- Curanto – typical food in Chilean gastronomy based on baking seafood underground
- Espetada – Portuguese skewer dish that often uses squid or fish, especially monkfish
- Fideuà – Seafood dish from Valencia, Spain, similar to paella but with noodles instead of rice
- Halabos – Filipino process of cooking shrimp, crab, lobster, or fish
- Hoe – Korean raw food dishes consisting of a wide variety of seafoods
- Hoedeopbap – Korean dish
- Kaeng som – Thai, Lao, and Malaysian curry dish based on fish, especially snakehead, as well as using shrimp or fish eggs
- Kedgeree – Indian-British fish and rice-based dish traditionally using haddock
- Maeuntang – Korean spicy fish soup
- Mie cakalang – Indonesian dish from North Sulawesi consisting of skipjack tuna in noodle soup
- Moules-frites – Belgian dish of mussels and fries
- Namasu – Japanese dish of thinly sliced uncooked vegetables and seafood
- New England clam bake – Communal dining tradition from New England, method of cooking shellfish
- Paella – Rice dish from the Valencian Community, Spain, with mussels, shrimp, and fish
- Paelya – Philippine rice dish, similar to paella but differs with usage of glutinous rice
- Paila marina – Chilean seafood soup or stew, notable for usage of unique varieties of seafood such as giant barnacles, piura tunicates, and Chilean mussels
- Piaparan – Filipino dish using chicken or seafood
- Plateau de fruits de mer – French seafood dish
- Seafood basket
- Seafood birdsnest – Chinese cuisine dish
- Seafood boil – Type of social event involving the consumption of seafood
- Seafood cocktail – Shellfish appetizer
- Seafood pizza – Variety of pizza with seafood toppings
- Stroganina – Siberian dish of sliced raw fish
- Surf and turf – American dish of seafood and meat
- Sushi – Traditional Japanese dish of vinegared rice and raw seafood

=== Clam dishes ===
- Clams casino – a clam "on the halfshell" dish with breadcrumbs and bacon. It originated in Rhode Island in the United States and is often served as an appetizer in New England and is served in variations nationally.
- Clam cake – also known as clam fritters
- Clam dip – a dipping sauce and condiment
- Clam liquor – a liquid extracted during cooking and opening of clams. Undiluted it is called clam broth.
- Clam pie – Savory meat pie prepared using clams
  - White clam pie – a pizza variety
- Clam soup – a soup prepared using clams as a main ingredient
  - Clam chowder – a well-known chowder soup
  - Jaecheop-guk – a clear Korean soup made with small freshwater clams
- Fabes con almejas – a clam and bean stew that originated in the principality of Asturias in the 19th century as peasant fare. It is a lighter variation of Asturian fabada whose primary ingredients are sausage, beans and pork.
- Fried clams – New England seafood dish
- New England clam bake – also simply called a "clam bake"
- Clams oreganata – an Italian American seafood dish served most commonly as an appetizer
- Clam sauce – used as a topping for pasta
- Spaghetti alle vongole – Italian and Italian-American dish of spaghetti with clams
- Steamed clams – Seafood dish consisting of clams
- Stuffed clam – American seafood dish

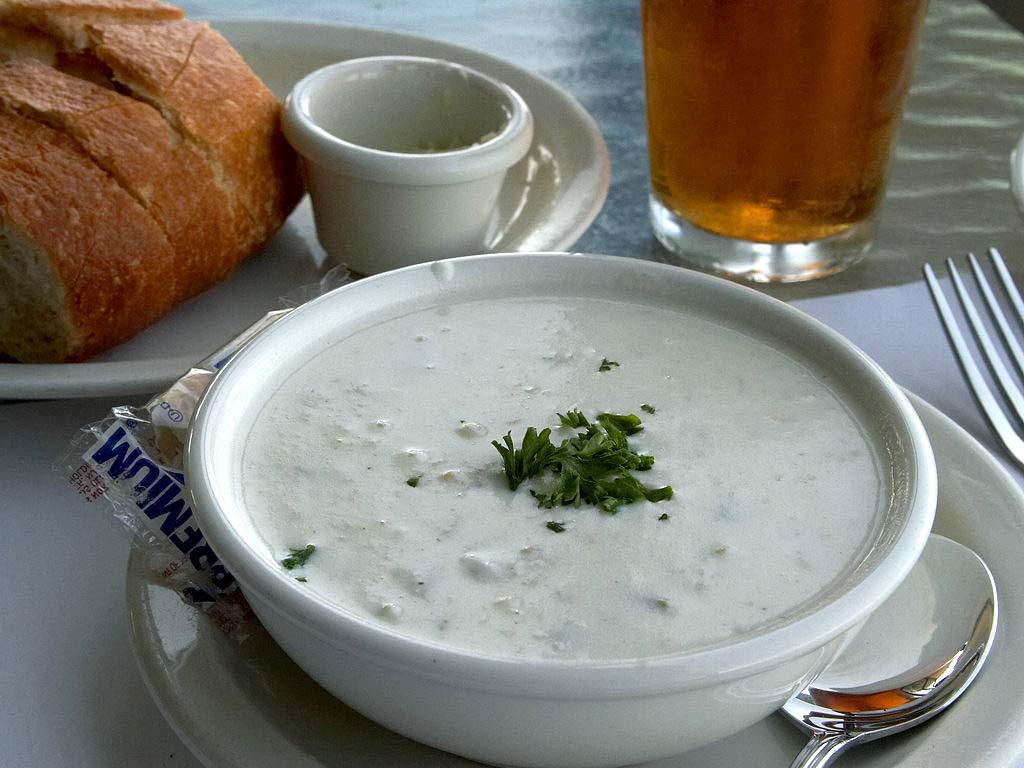
Clam chowder is any of several chowders containing clams and broth. Diced potato and onions are also common ingredients. Pictured is New England–style clam chowder.

=== Crab dishes ===
- Bisque (food) – a smooth, creamy, highly seasoned soup of French origin, classically based on a strained broth (coulis) of crustaceans. It can be made from lobster, crab, shrimp or crayfish.
- Black pepper crab – one of the two most popular ways that crab is served in Malaysia and Singapore. It is made with hard-shell crabs, and fried with black pepper. Unlike the other popular chilli crab dish, it is less heavy due to the absence of a sauce.
- Bún riêu – Bún riêu cua is served with tomato broth and topped with crab or shrimp paste.
- Chilli crab – a seafood dish popular in Malaysia and Singapore. Mud crabs are commonly used and are stir-fried in a semi-thick, sweet and savoury tomato and chilli based sauce.
- Corn crab soup – a dish found in Chinese cuisine, American Chinese cuisine, and Canadian Chinese cuisine, it is actually cream of corn soup with egg white and crab meat or imitation crab meat added.
- Crab cake – a variety of fishcake which is popular in the United States composed of crab meat and various other ingredients, such as bread crumbs, milk, mayonnaise, eggs, yellow onions, and seasonings. Especially popular in the Mid-Atlantic state of Maryland.
- Crab dip – typically prepared with cream cheese and lump crab meat.
- Crab ice cream – a Japanese creation, it is described as having a sweet taste. The island of Hokkaido, Japan, is known for manufacturing crab ice cream.
- Crab in oyster sauce – a Chinese seafood dish of crab served in savoury oyster sauce. It is a popular dish in Asia, that can be found from China, Malaysia, Singapore, Indonesia to the Philippines.
- Crab in Padang sauce or Padang crab (Indonesian: Kepiting saus Padang) – an Indonesian seafood dish of crab served in hot and spicy Padang sauce. It is a popular dish in Indonesia.
- Crab rangoon – deep-fried dumpling appetizers served in American Chinese and, more recently, Thai restaurants, stuffed with a combination of cream cheese, lightly flaked crab meat (more commonly, canned crab meat or imitation crab meat), with scallions, and/or garlic.
- Curacha Alavar – Filipino spanner crabs in coconut milk with various spices
- Deviled crab – a crab meat croquette. The crab meat is slowly sauteed with seasonings, breaded (traditionally with stale Cuban bread), rolled into the approximate shape of a rugby football or a small potato, and deep fried.
- Echizen kanimeshi – a type of ekiben from Fukui Prefecture, on the coast of the Sea of Japan
- Ganzuke – a variety of shiokara, salted fermented seafood in Japanese cuisine
- Gejang – a variety of jeotgal, salted fermented seafood in Korean cuisine, which is made by marinating fresh raw crabs either in ganjang (soy sauce) or in a sauce based on chili pepper powder. A similar dish (生腌蟹) exists in China.
- Ginataang alimango/Ginataang alimasag – Filipino black crab or flower crab in coconut milk with calabaza and spices
- Ginataang curacha – Filipino spanner crabs in coconut milk
- Halabos – Filipino crabs (or other crustaceans) cooked in saltwater with spices
- Inulukan – Filipino black crabs in coconut milk and taro leaves.
- Kakuluwo curry – a traditional Sri Lankan crab curry.
- Kanijiru – a traditional Japanese crab soup
- Kare rajungan – a traditional Indonesian of a blue crab in a curry sauce. It is a delicacy from Tuban, East Java.
- Ketam Masak Lemak Cili Api campur Nenas – a traditional Malaysian crab dish which crab is cooked with green spicy chilli and coconut milk together with pineapples. The sweetness of the crab meat (normally flower crab) is intensified by adding the pineapples.
- Kani Cream Korokke – a Japanese take on the traditional French croquette; can be made with either real or imitation crab meat (although imitation crab meat versions are more commonplace).
- Njandu roast – Kerala style crab roast.
- Pastel de jaiba – Chilean crab (jaiba in local Spanish) pie.
- She-crab soup – a rich soup, similar to bisque, made of milk or heavy cream, crab or fish stock, Atlantic blue crab meat, and (traditionally) crab roe, and a small amount of dry sherry.
- Soft-shell crab – a culinary term for crabs which have recently molted their old exoskeleton and are still soft.
  - Taba ng talangka – traditional Filipino fermented crab paste. It can be eaten as is over white rice, but can also be used as a condiment or as an ingredient in various Filipino seafood dishes.
- West Indies salad – a variation of crab meat ceviche that originated in the Mobile, Alabama area.

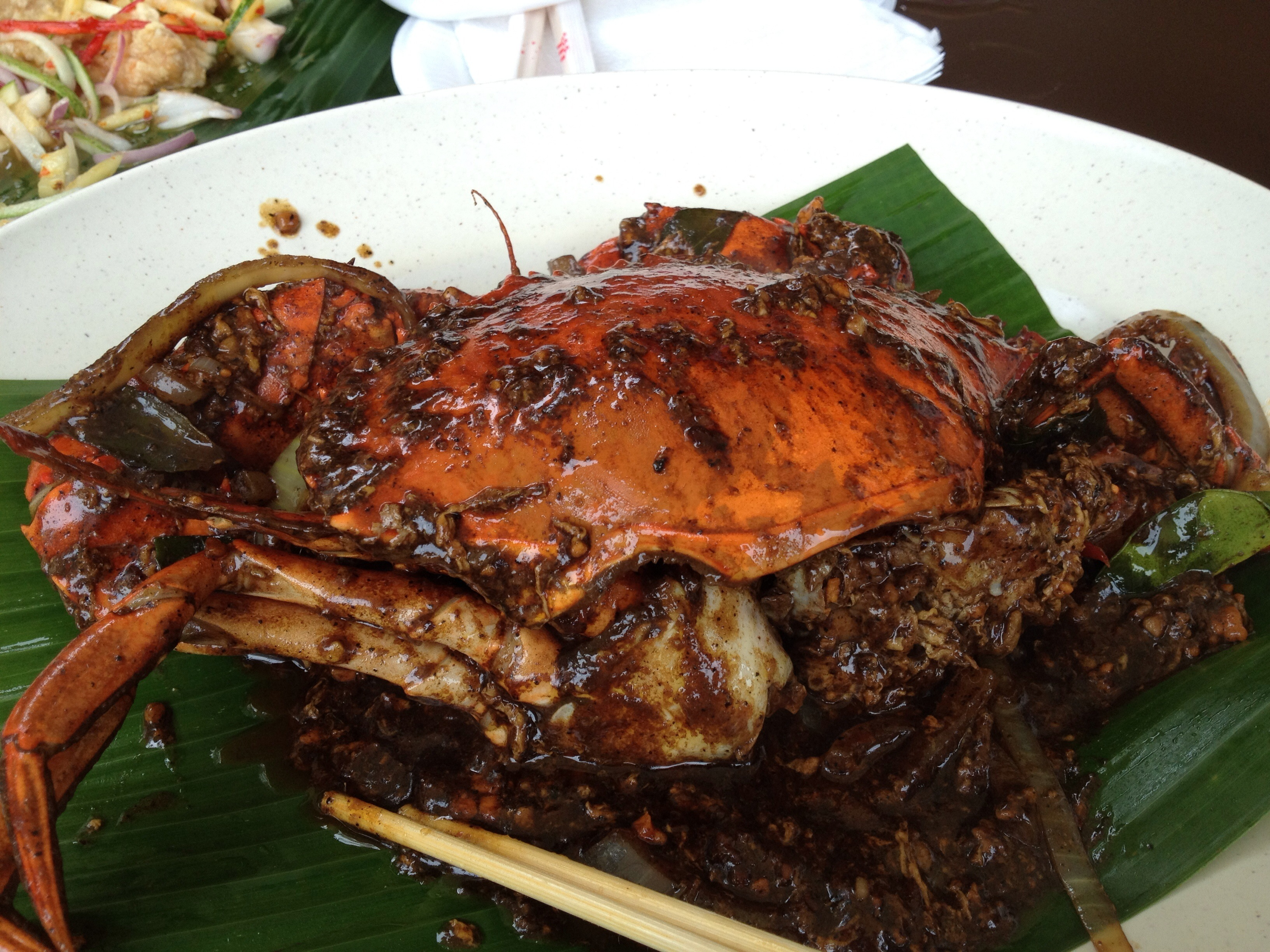
Black pepper crab is a popular way to prepare crab in Singapore.

=== Fish dishes ===
==== Carp ====
- Fisherman's soup – Hungarian fish stew
- Masgouf – fried carp dish from Iraq

==== Catfish ====
- Catfish stew – Catfish dish from the American South
- Mohinga – rice noodle and fish soup from Myanmar

==== Cod and saltfish ====
- Bacalaíto – Seafood dish from Puerto Rico
- Bacalhau à Brás – Portuguese salt cod dish
- Bacalhau à Gomes de Sá – Typical fish from Porto, Portugal
- Bacalhau à Zé do Pipo – Bacalhau casserole
- Bacalhau com natas – Salt cod casserole
- Bacalhau com todos – Portuguese salt cod dish
- Baccalà all'abruzzese – Italian dish
- Baccalà alla lucana – Christmas dish of cod and red peppers from Basilicata, Italy
- Baccalà alla vicentina – Venetian food dish
- Bolinhos de bacalhau – Portuguese and Brazilian dish of fish balls
- Brandade – Emulsion of salt cod, olive oil, and potatoes
- Esgarret – Valencian cod dish
- Esqueixada – Catalan fish salad
- Fish and brewls – Newfoundland dish of cod and hardtack
- Stamp and Go – Jamaican fritter of saltfish

==== Eel ====
- Eel noodles
- Eel pie
- Jellied eels
- Kabayaki
- Unadon

==== Flatfish ====
- Sole meunière

==== Milkfish ====
- Milkfish congee
- Sate Bandeng

==== Salmon ====
- Dishwasher salmon
- Lox

==== Sharks and rays ====
- Bake and shark – Trinidadian street food dish of shark
- Hákarl – Icelandic dish of fermented shark
- Sambal stingray – Barbecued stingray with sambal
- Shark chutney – Shark dish from Seychelles

=== Lobster dishes ===
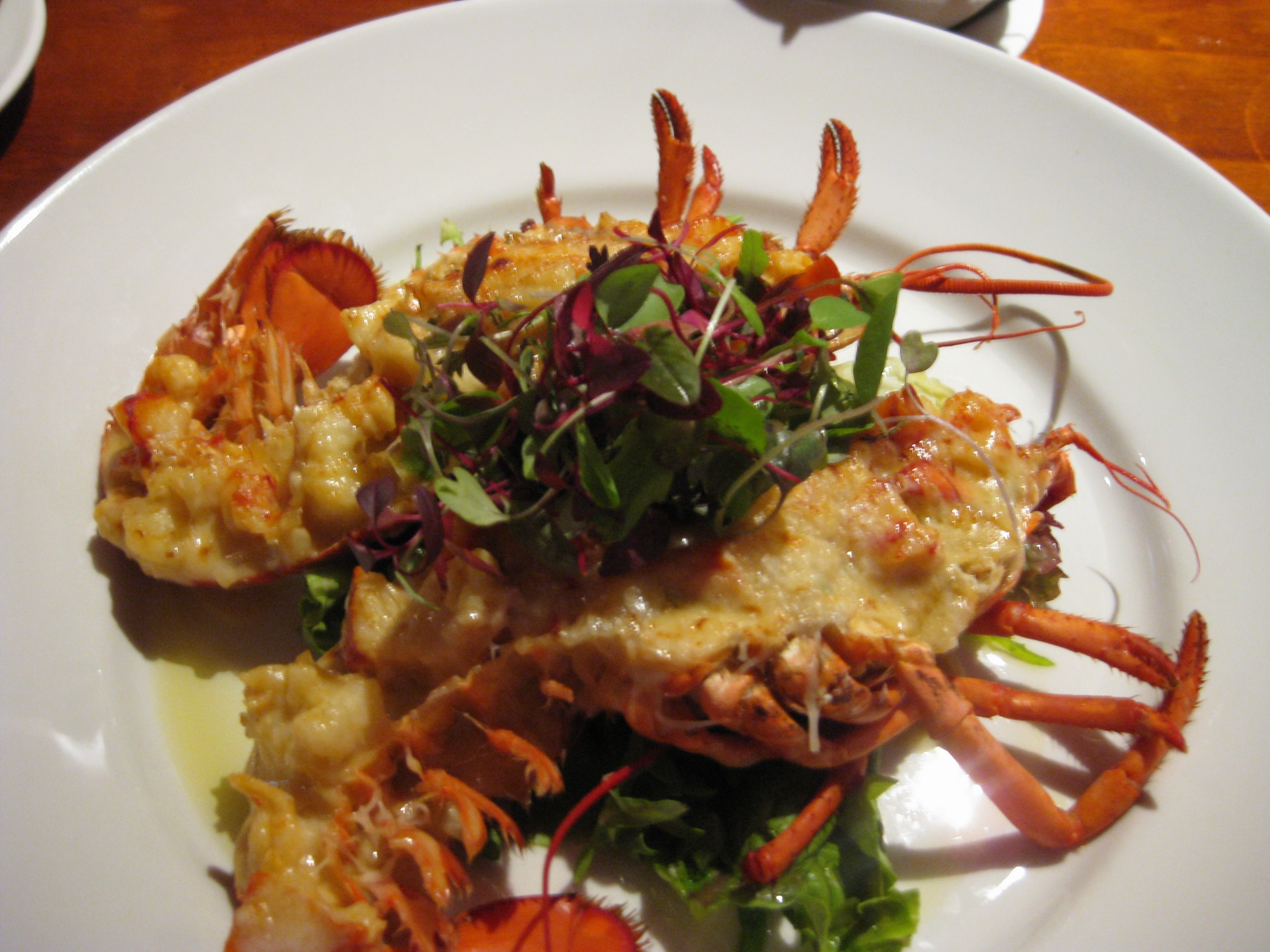
Lobster Thermidor is a French dish consisting of a creamy mixture of cooked lobster meat, egg yolks, and cognac or brandy, stuffed into a lobster shell.

- Ginataang sugpo – Filipino seafood soup that does not use vegetables
- Lobster bisque – Cream-based soup of French origin
- Lobster Newberg – American seafood dish
- Lobster roll – New England dish
- Lobster stew – Various stews involving lobster
- Lobster Thermidor – French dish
- Scampi – Seafood dish and style of preparation

=== Octopus dishes ===
- Miruhulee boava – Maldivian delicacy
- Nakji-bokkeum – Korean stir-fried octopus dish
- Nakji-yeonpo-tang – Korean beef or octopus soup dish
- Polbo á feira – Galician octopus dish
- Polvo à Lagareiro – Portuguese octopus dish
- Pulpo a la campechana – Mexican dish made with octopus
- Akashiyaki – Japanese round dumpling with octopus filling
- San-nakji – Raw octopus dish in Korean cuisine
- Takoyaki – Japanese appetizer
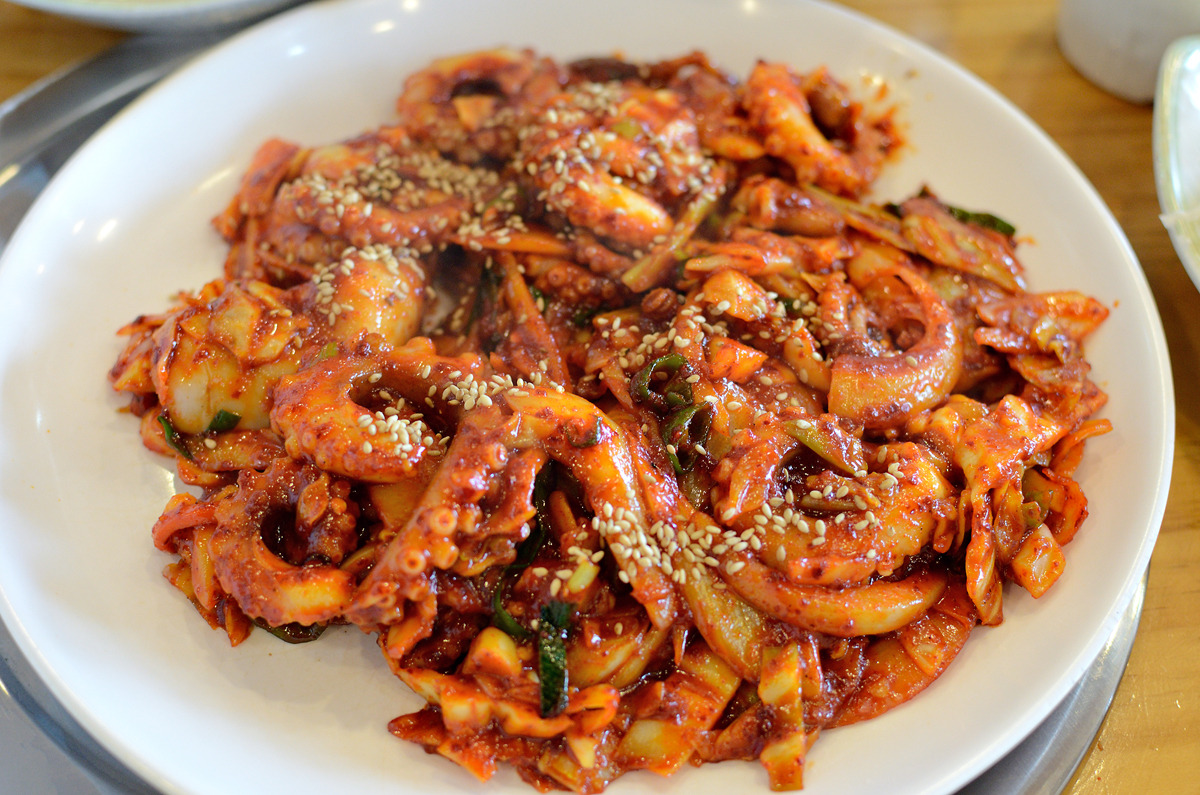
Nakji-bokkeum (stir-fried octopus)

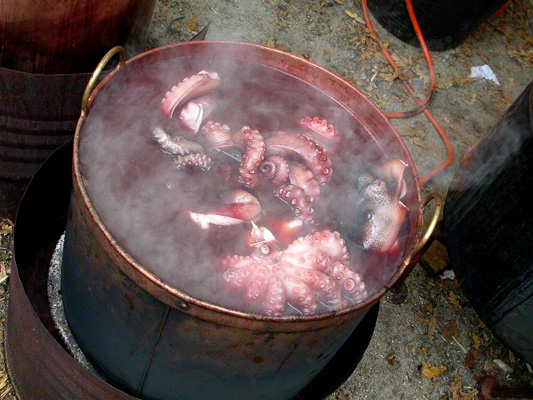
Octopus cooking in a pot

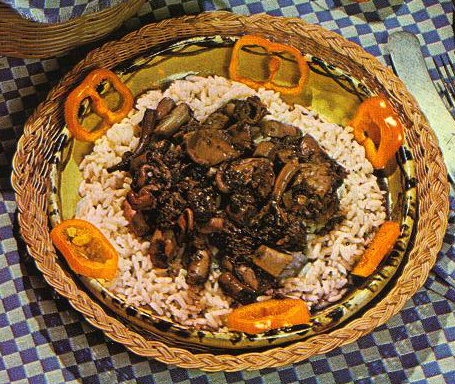
Pulpo a la campechana

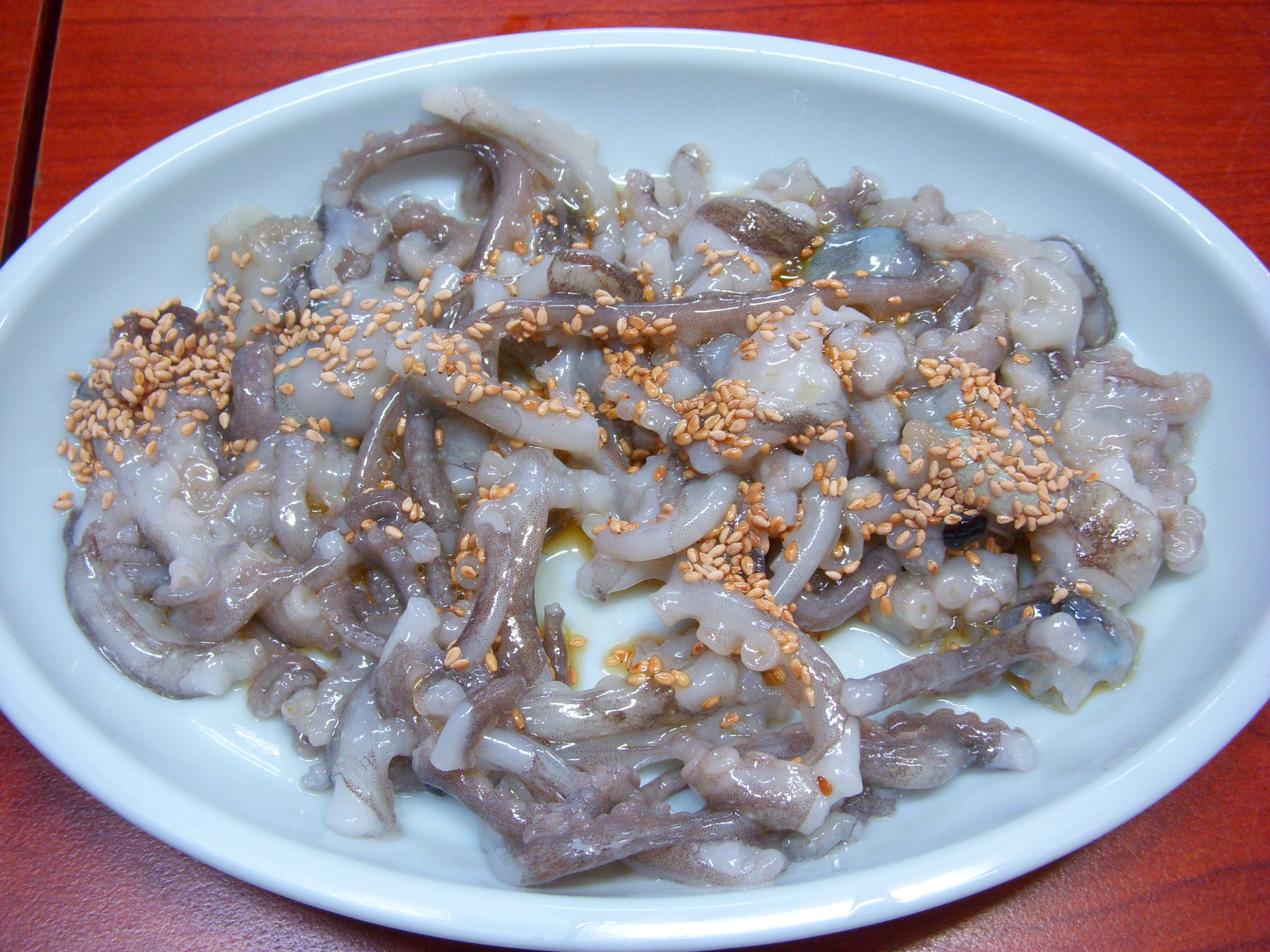
San-nakji (sliced raw octopus)

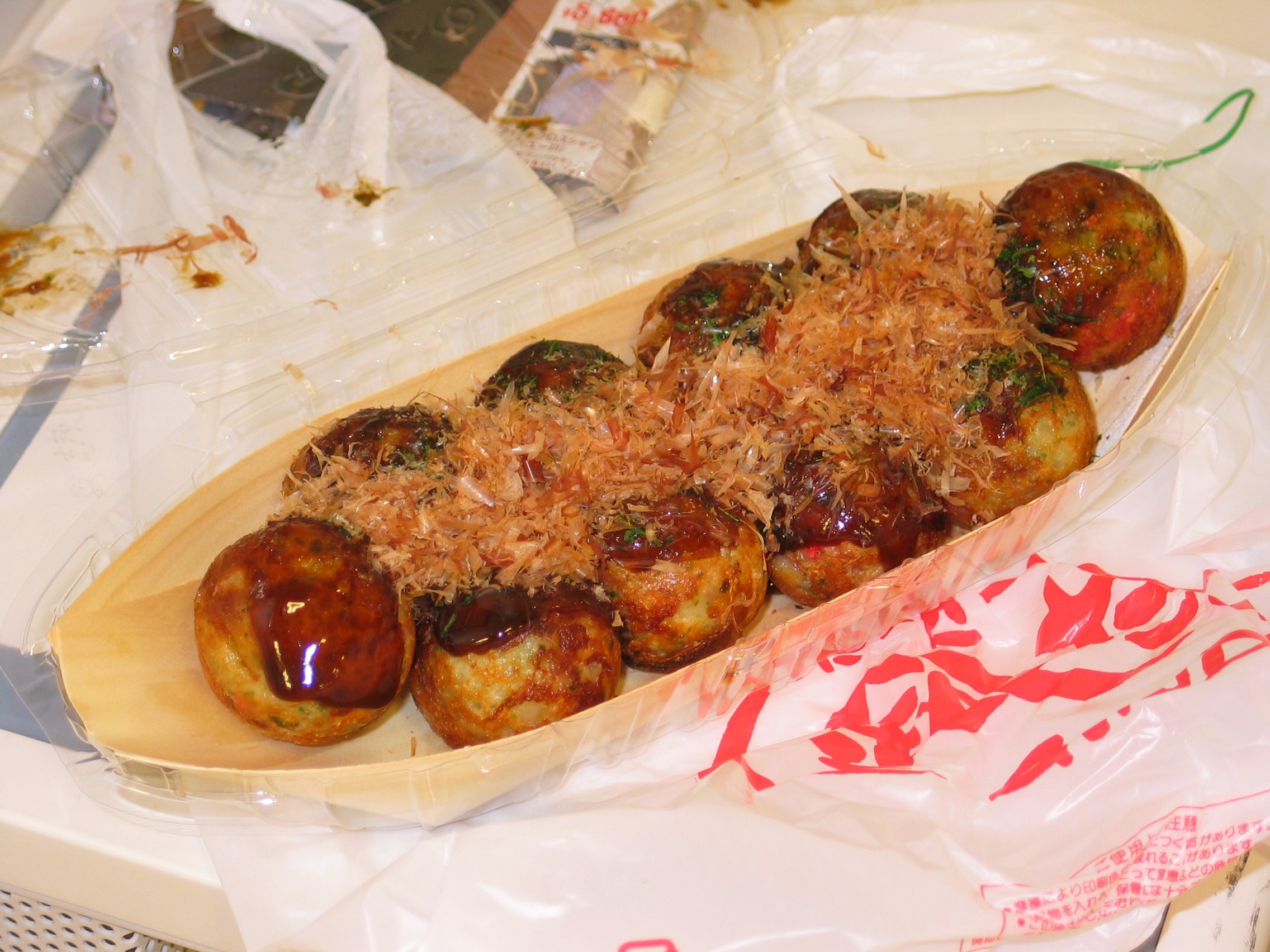
Takoyaki is a ball-shaped Japanese snack made of a wheat flour-based batter and typically filled with minced or diced octopus.

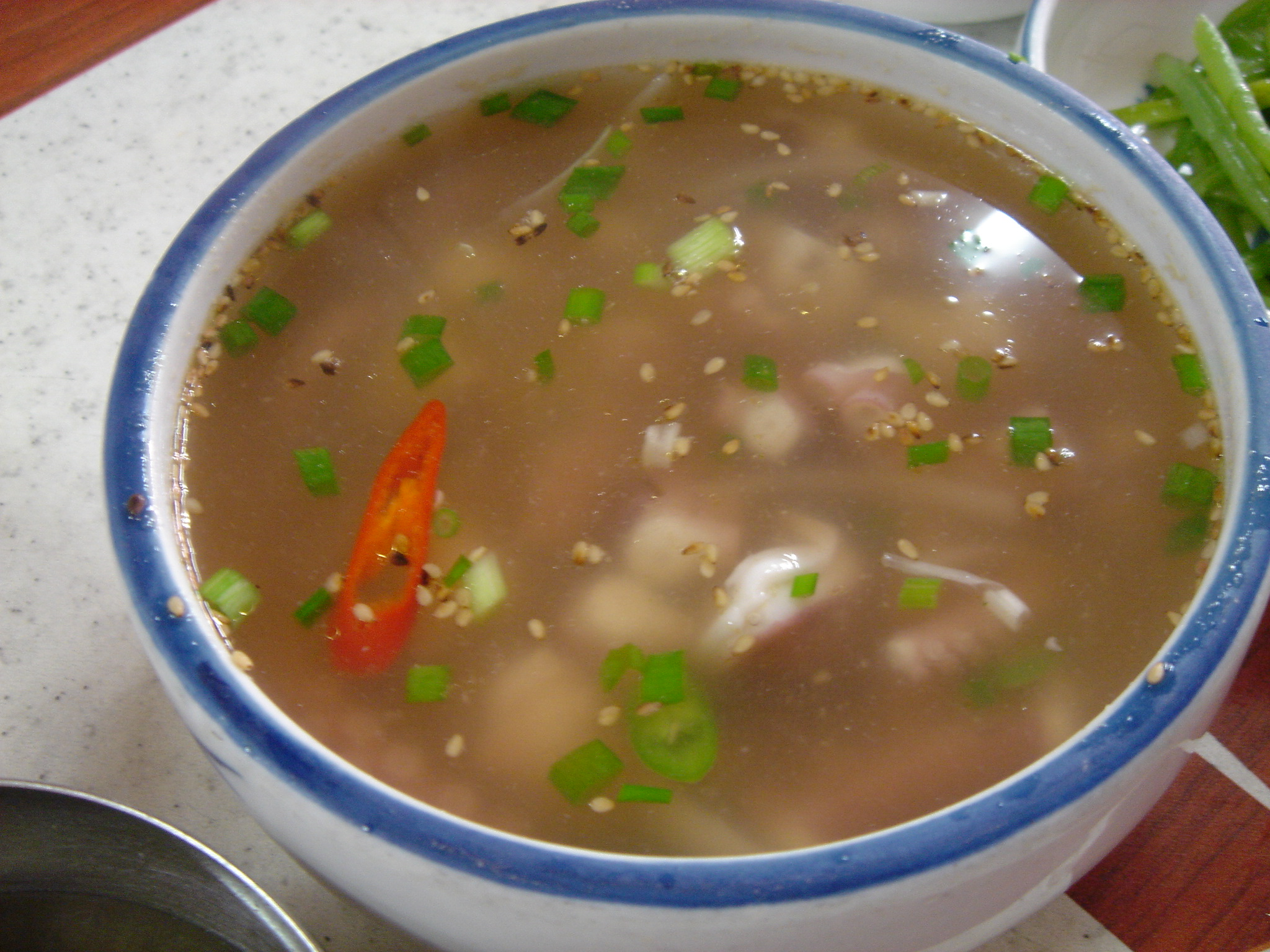
Nakji-yeonpo-tang (octopus soup)

=== Oyster dishes ===
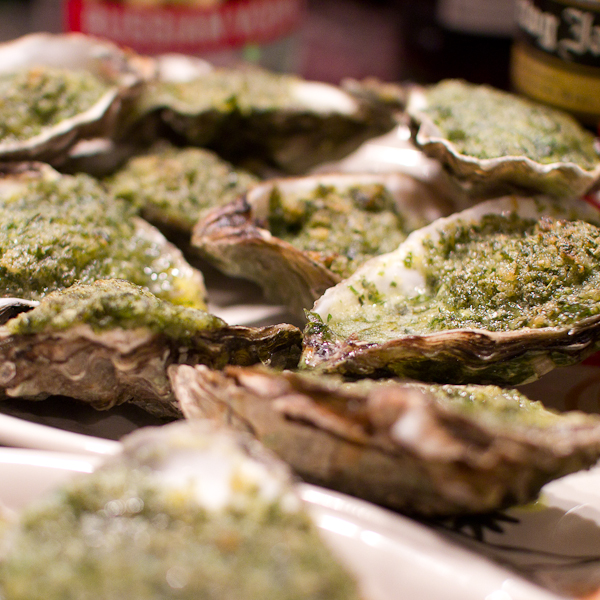
Oysters Rockefeller consists of oysters on the half-shell that have been topped with various other ingredients (often parsley and other green herbs, a rich butter sauce and bread crumbs) and are then baked or broiled.

- Angels on horseback – Bacon-wrapped oysters
- Hangtown fry – American egg, oyster, and bacon dish
- Oyster omelette – Southeast Asian dish
- Oyster sauce – Condiment made by cooking oysters
- Oyster vermicelli – Taiwanese noodle soup
- Oysters Bienville – Seafood recipe
- Oysters en brochette – Classic dish in New Orleans Creole cuisine
- Oysters Kirkpatrick – Oyster dish
- Oysters Rockefeller – Type of oyster dish
- Steak and oyster pie – Victorian English pie dish

=== Shrimp dishes ===
- Balchão – Goan dish with shrimp, prawn, and shrimp

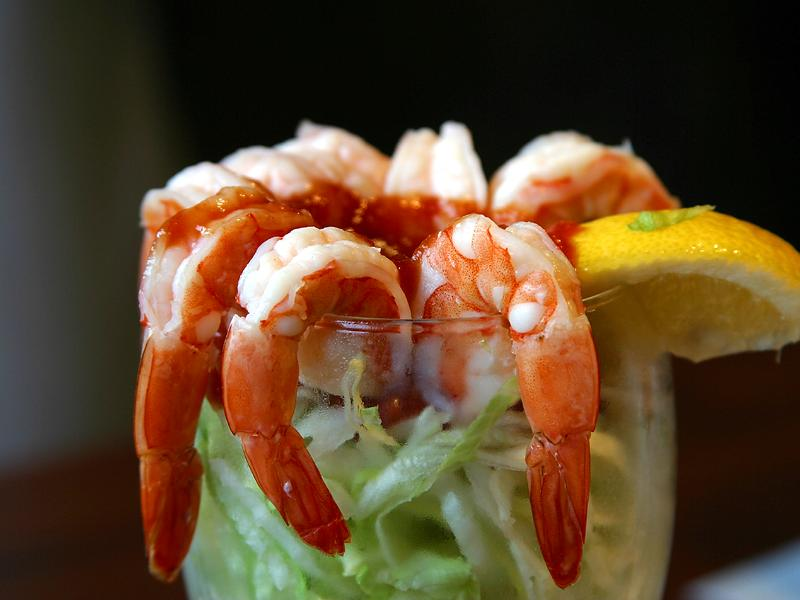
A prawn cocktail

=== Squid dishes ===
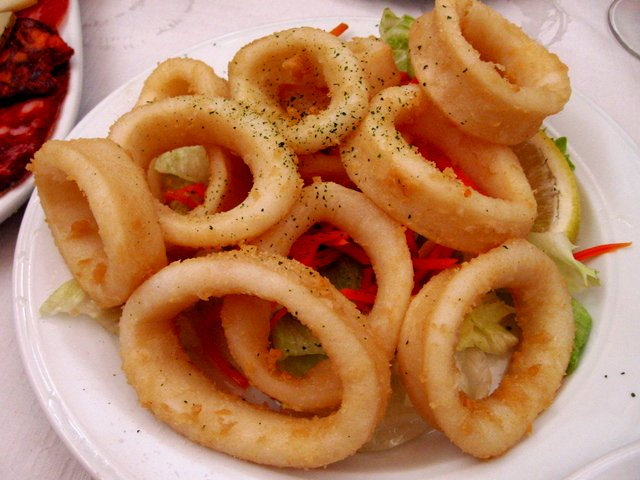
Deep fried calamari

- Adobong pusit – Filipino dish of meat cooked in soy sauce and vinegar
- Arròs negre – Valencian and Catalan seafood and rice dish
- Dried shredded squid – Seafood product
- Fried calamari
- Gising-gising – Spicy Filipino vegetable soup or stew
- Ikameshi – Squid rice
- Mực rang muối – Vietnamese five-spice squid dish
- Orange cuttlefish – Cantonese cuttlefish dish
- Paella negra – Valencian and Catalan seafood and rice dish
- Pancit choca – Filipino black seafood noodle dish
- Salted squid – Type of preserved seafood
- Squid cocktail – Seafood dish
- Cuttlefish – Family of demersal cephalopod

== See also ==
- Eating live seafood
- Edible seaweed
- List of beef dishes
- List of chicken dishes
- List of fish and seafood soups
- List of fish dishes
- List of lamb dishes
- List of pork dishes
- List of raw fish dishes
- List of seafood companies
- List of types of seafood
- Seafood dishes
- Seafood restaurant
