= Deviled egg =

Egg-based dish

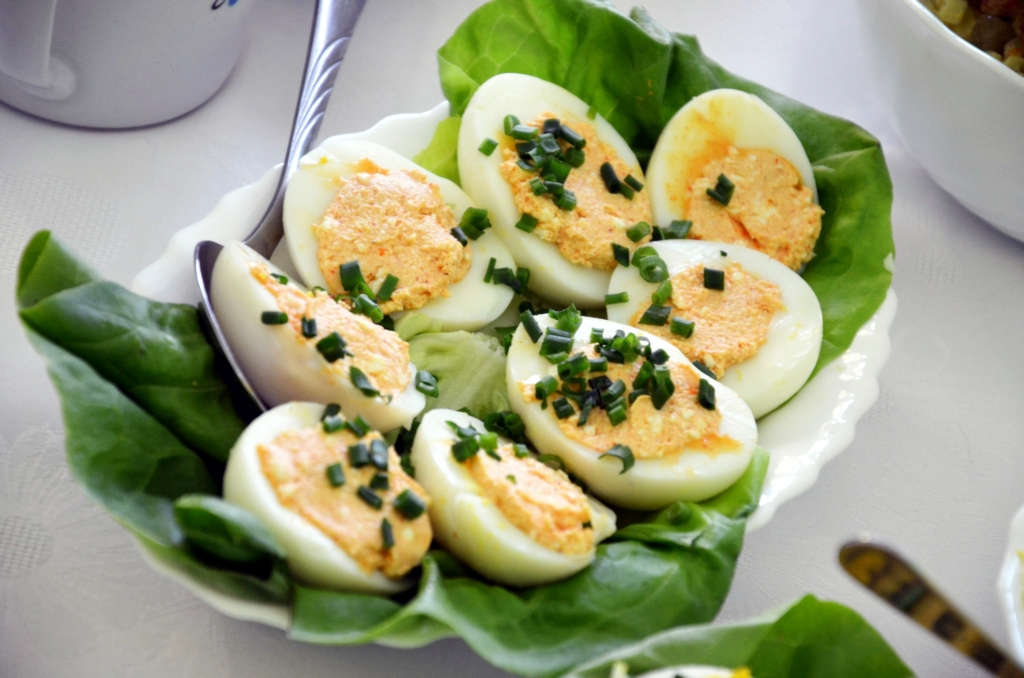
- A bowl of deviled eggs
- Alternative names: stuffed eggs, Russian eggs, dressed eggs, curried eggs
- Course: Hors d'oeuvre
- Place of origin: England
- Serving temperature: Cold
- Main ingredients: Eggs, mayonnaise, mustard
- Variations: Multiple
- Food energy (per serving): 200 kcal (840 kJ)

Deviled eggs (American English) or devilled eggs (British English), also known as stuffed eggs, curried eggs, dressed eggs or angel eggs, are hard-boiled eggs that have been peeled, cut in half, with the yolk scooped out, then refilled after being mixed with other ingredients such as mayonnaise and mustard and sprinkled with paprika, cinnamon or curry powder. They are generally served cold as a side dish, appetizer or a main course during gatherings or parties. The dish is popular in Europe, North America and Australia.

== Etymology ==
The adjective "devilled" first appeared in print in the mid-1500s. The English word "devil", in reference to highly seasoned food, was in use in the 18th century, with the first known print reference appearing in 1786. In the 19th century, the adjective "devilled" came to be used most often with spicy or zesty food, including eggs prepared with mustard, pepper, or other ingredients stuffed in the yolk cavity. Similar uses of "devil" for spiced foods include deviled ham and fra diavolo sauce (from the Italian word for "devil").

At church functions in parts of the Southern and Midwestern United States, the terms "stuffed eggs", "salad eggs", and "dressed eggs" occur instead, to avoid reference to the word "devil". For this reason, the term "angel eggs" is also occasionally used.

== History ==
Recipes for hard-boiled eggs stuffed with herbs, cheese and raisins can be found in the cookery texts of medieval European cuisine.

The earliest known recipe for a stuffed egg is believed to have been written in the Andalusian region of Spain during the 13th century. According to the English translation of a recipe found in an unnamed 13th century Andalusian cookbook, boiled egg yolks were mixed with cilantro (coriander), pepper, and onion juice, then beat with murri (a sauce made of fermented barley or fish), oil and salt. The mixture was then stuffed into the hollowed-out egg whites, and the two halves of the egg were fastened back together with a small stick and topped with pepper.

In his 1585 cookery book The Good Huswifes Jewell, Thomas Dawson suggests filling hardboiled eggs with a "farsing stuffe as you do for flesh".

The first known recipe to suggest the use of mayonnaise as an ingredient in deviled eggs was in the 1896 version of The Boston Cooking School Cook Book by Fannie Farmer.

== Preparation and ingredients ==
Video demonstration preparing deviled eggs

Cooled hard-boiled eggs are peeled and halved lengthwise, with the yolks then removed; they can be cut crosswise for more filling. The yolk is then mashed and mixed with a variety of other ingredients. These usually incorporate a fat-based product (such as butter, heavy cream, or mayonnaise) with spicy and/or piquant ingredients to contrast taste (and, sometimes, texture). One recipe has the yolks mashed with mayonnaise, dijon mustard, vinegar, pickle relish and salt and pepper. The yolk mixture is then scooped into each egg "cup" formed by the firm egg whites.

Ingredient choices vary widely and there is no standard recipe. Although mayonnaise is most common, some recipes use butter, and sweet pickle relish sometimes replaces the sour pickles.

=== Variations ===
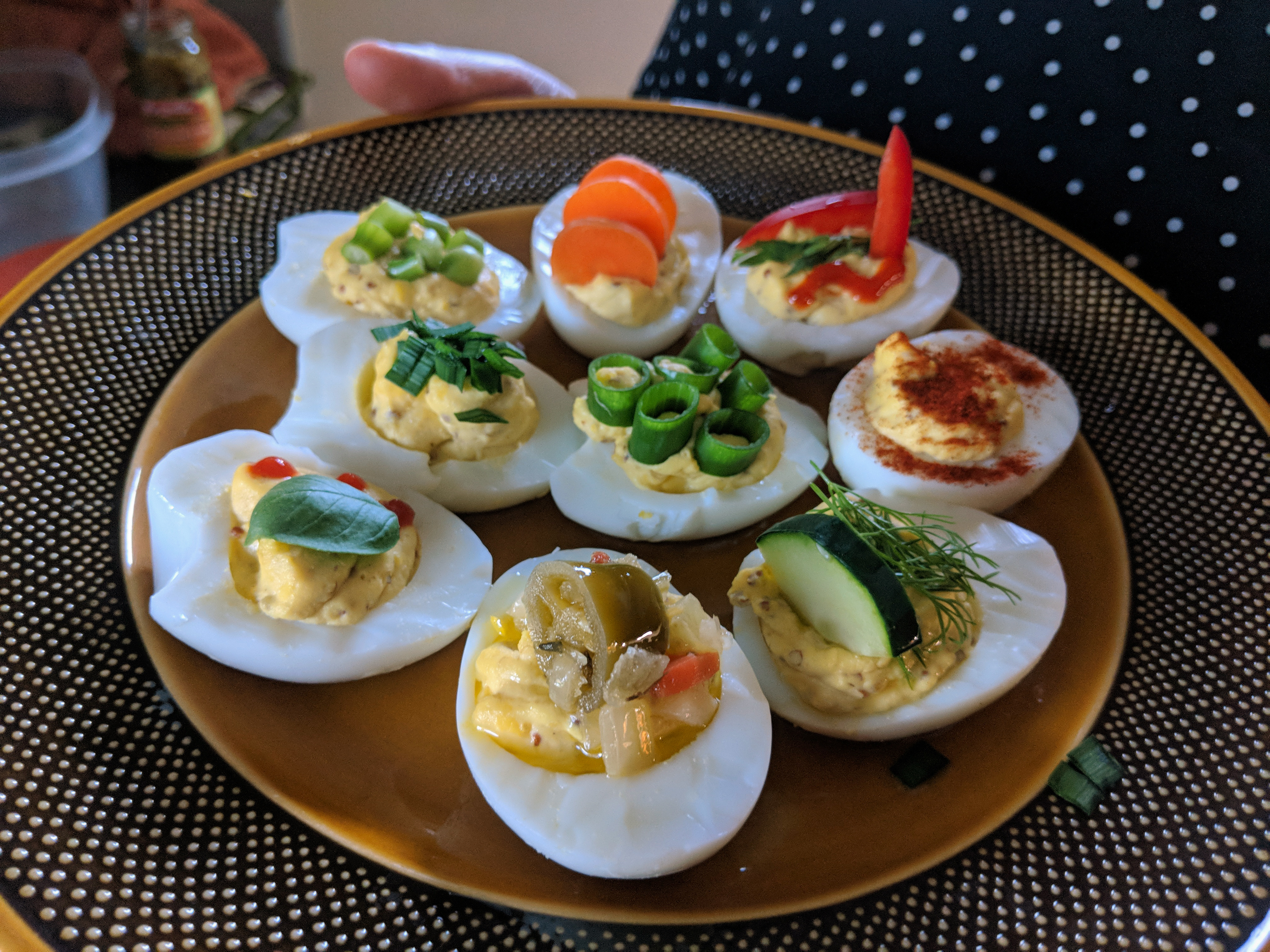
Assortment of deviled eggs

There are many variations on the basic recipe that may add ingredients such as:

- mayonnaise
- cod liver
- diced pickle or pickle relish
- herbs and spices
- vinegar
- mustard
- scallions
- green olives
- pimentoes
- poppyseed
- minced onion
- caviar
- capers
- cream or sour cream

== In different countries ==
=== United States ===
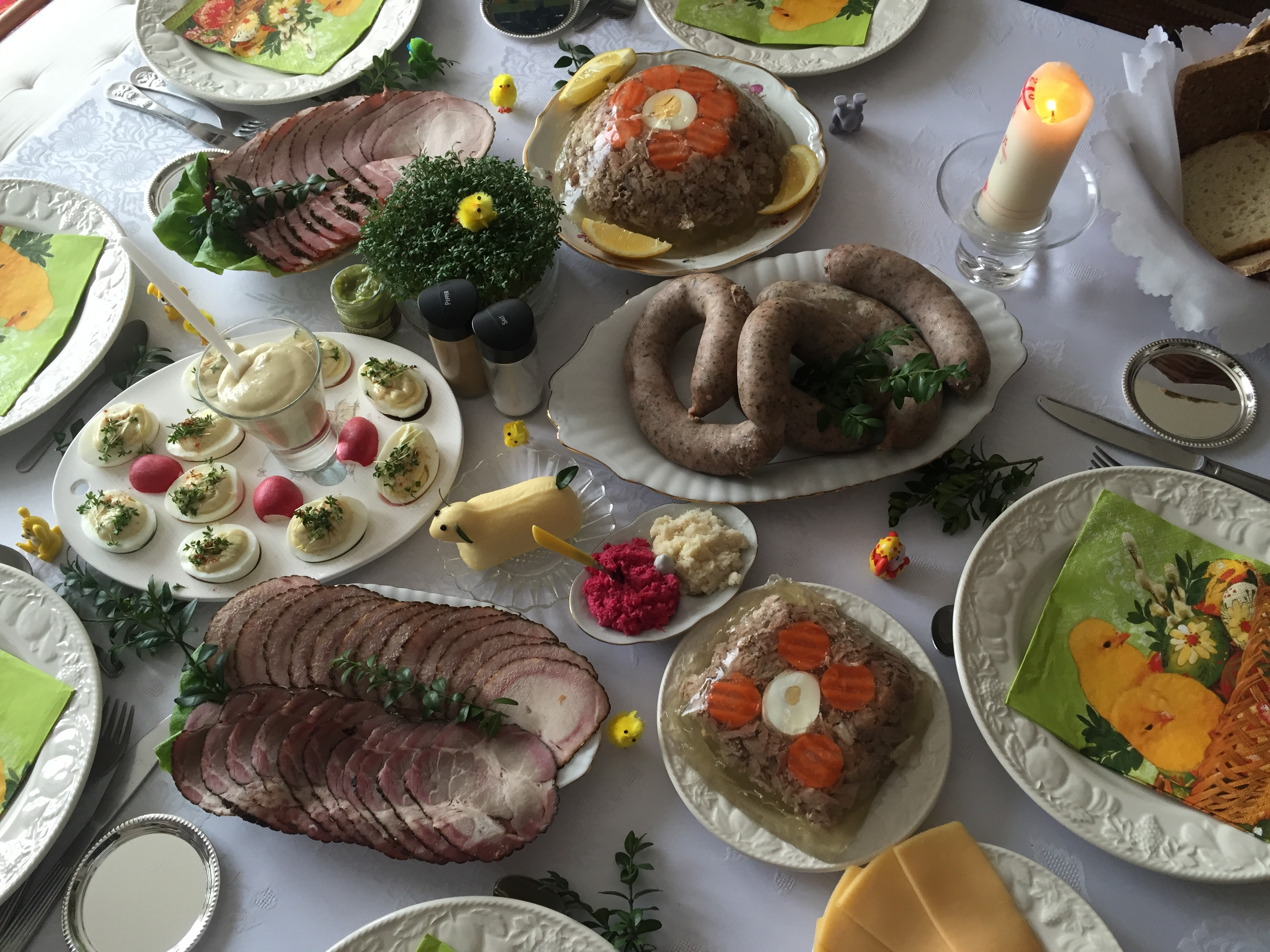
Deviled eggs served as part of a Polish Easter breakfast

Deviled eggs were introduced to the U.S. by the British. In the United States, deviled eggs are a common dish that are typically served as hors d'oeuvres or appetizers during gatherings and parties.

The eggs are boiled, cooled, shelled, and then sliced in half. The yolk is then removed and mixed with other ingredients, such as mayonnaise, mustard, vinegar, pickle relish, and other spices and herbs. It is then blended into a smooth paste, used to fill the hollowed-out egg whites. They are generally served cold and are often dusted with paprika.

The earliest known American recipe for deviled eggs was printed in the Montgomery Advertiser, a news publication in Montgomery, Alabama, in 1877.

Deviled eggs have been a popular dish in the United States as far back as the 1920s. In 1923, Wanda Barton suggested in her newspaper column, "Home-Making Helps", to save egg cartons because "they are fine for carrying boiled or deviled eggs." By the 1940s, deviled eggs had become standard fare at picnics, parties and gatherings in the United States.

According to an online survey commissioned by McCormick in 2019, nearly 61 percent of Americans planned to make or eat deviled eggs during Easter Sunday that year.

=== Europe ===
In some European countries, such as Germany, a variation is served known as "Russian eggs". This consists of eggs cut in half, served with vegetable macédoine and garnished with mayonnaise, parsley and tomato. Contrary to what the name might suggest, the dish does not originate in Russia; its name derives from the fact that the eggs are served on a bed of macédoine, which is sometimes called "Russian salad". In German cuisine, other common flavorings of the yolks are anchovies, cheese and caper.

In France, the dish is called œuf mimosa ("mimosa egg", named after the appearance of the mimosa tree); in Italy uova ripiene ("stuffed eggs") in Hungary, töltött tojás ("stuffed egg") or kaszinótojás ("casino egg"); in Poland, jajka faszerowane ("stuffed eggs"); in the Netherlands gevuld ei ("stuffed egg"); in Sweden fyllda ägg ("stuffed eggs"); on the island of Malta bajd mimli ("stuffed eggs").

==== United Kingdom ====
A 16th-century recipe for deviled eggs comes from Thomas Dawson's book The Good Huswifes Jewell. It stuffs the eggs with a mixture of herbs and spices.

The term devilled eggs in English first appeared in print in 1786.

In the United Kingdom, the dish is popular at buffets. The eggs are made with a mixture of mayonnaise, English mustard, paprika and chives. Cayenne pepper or Tabasco sauce is often added to the mixture.

==== Italy ====
In Italy, uova ripiene are usually stuffed with minced boiled egg yolks, tuna, capers, anchovies, chopped parsley, and mayonnaise. They are usually prepared around Easter time.

==== Sweden ====
In Sweden, the deviled egg (fyllda ägghalvor) is a traditional dish for the Smörgåsbord during Easter, where the yolk is mixed with caviar, cream or sour cream, optionally chopped red onion, and decorated with chopped chives or dill, perhaps with a piece of anchovy or pickled herring.

==== Hungary ====
In Hungarian cuisine, the yolks are mashed and mixed with white bread soaked in milk, mustard and parsley, often served as an appetizer.

==== Romania ====
In Romania, deviled eggs are called ouă umplute (“stuffed eggs”) and are a popular dish frequently prepared both for religious and secular celebrations. Several stuffings are available with the most frequent consisting of the classic mixture of yolks with mayonnaise, or with liver paté added, a different mixture with cheese or fish paste decorated with carrot or pickle slices and parsley or dill leaves.

== See also ==
- Deviled crab
- Deviled ham
- Devilled kidneys
- Egg salad
- Mimosa salad
- List of egg dishes
- List of hors d'oeuvre
- List of stuffed dishes
