= Seafood dishes =

Seafood dishes or fish dishes are distinct food dishes which use seafood (fish, shellfish or seaweed) as primary ingredients, and are ready to be served or eaten with any needed preparation or cooking completed. Seafood dishes are usually developed within a cuisine or characteristic style of cooking practice and tradition, often associated with a specific culture. A cuisine is primarily influenced by the ingredients that are available locally or through trade. Religious food laws, such as Islamic dietary laws and Jewish dietary laws, can also exercise a strong influence. Regional food preparation traditions, customs and ingredients often combine to create seafood dishes unique to a particular region.

Many fish or seafood dishes have a specific names (sauerbraten), while others are simply described (fried fish) or named for particular places (Cullen skink). As with other food dishes, there can be a high level of culinary mythology concerning regional claims to particular seafood dishes, and it is not always clear where particular dishes originated.

== History ==
There have been many significant improvements during the last century in food preservation, storage, shipping and production. Today, most countries, cities and regions have access to their traditional cuisines and many other global cuisines, and new cuisines continue to evolve. Cuisine can be stated as the foods and methods of food preparation traditional to a region or population. The major factors shaping a cuisine are climate, which in large measure determines the native raw materials that are available, economic conditions, which affect trade and can affect food distribution, imports and exports, and religious or sumptuary laws, under which certain foods are required or proscribed.

Climate also affects the supply of fuel for cooking; a common Chinese food preparation method was cutting food into small pieces to cook foods quickly and conserve scarce firewood and charcoal. Foods preserved for winter consumption by smoking, curing, and pickling have remained significant in world cuisines for their altered gustatory properties even when these preserving techniques are no longer strictly necessary to the maintenance of an adequate food supply.

== Global and regional dishes ==
Global cuisines can be categorized by regions according to the common use of major foodstuffs, such as seafood. Regional cuisines can vary according to food availability and trade, cooking traditions and cultural differences. Historically, fish and seafoods have often been staple diets near the coast or near certain rivers or lakes. From Indonesia to India to Indonesia, seafood has been used throughout the region both as foodstuffs and as seasonings.

== See also ==
- List of seafood dishes
- List of types of seafood
- Seafood restaurant
