= Mortis (food) =

Sweet chicken pâté of Elizabethan times

A mortis, also spelt mortrose, mortress, mortrews, or mortruys, was a sweet pâté of a meat such as chicken or fish, mixed with ground almonds, made in Medieval, Tudor and Elizabethan era England. It is known from one of England's earliest cookery books, The Forme of Cury (1390), and other manuscripts.

== Dish ==
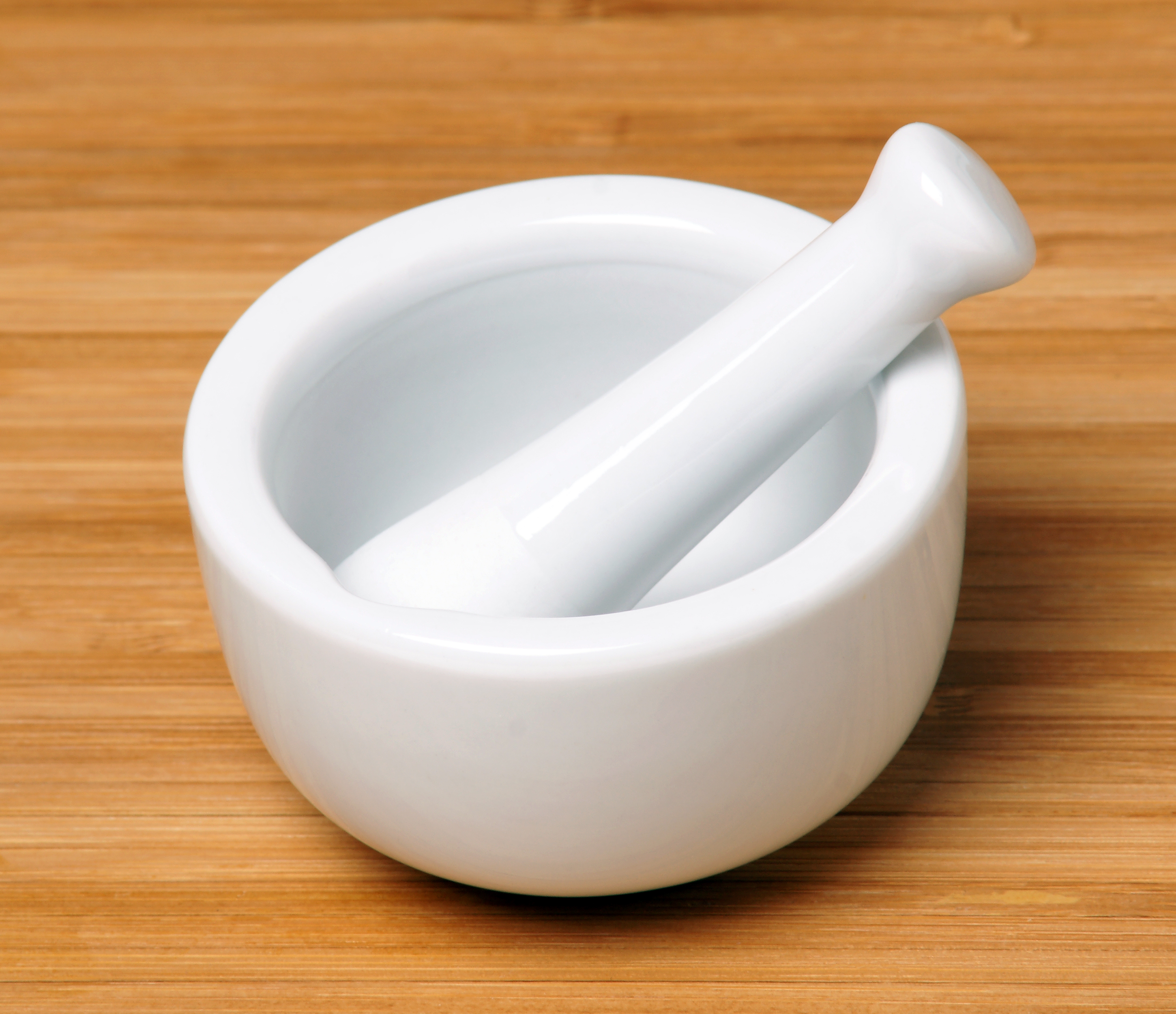
Mortis is probably named for the mortar and pestle used in its preparation.

A Tudor mortis recipe for chicken is given in The Good Huswifes Jewell, an English cookery book of 1585 by Thomas Dawson. He instructs:

To make a mortis:
Take almonds and blanche them, and beat them in a morter, and boyle a Chicken, and take al the flesh of him, and beate it, and straine them together, with milke and water and so put them into the pot, and put in Suger and stirre them still, and when it hath boyled a good while, take it of, and set it a cooling in a payle of water, and straine it againe with Rose water into a dish.

The dish consists of meat, such as chicken or fish, boiled and pounded with blanched almonds and milk into a smooth paste. This is then cooked gently with sugar.

An earlier recipe for "mortrose of fyshe" (fish mortis) is given in the 1390 cookery book, The Forme of Cury, written for King Richard's cooks. It called for houndfish, haddock, or cod, using the liver as well as the flesh, mixed with milk, white breadcrumbs and sugar. A similar recipe appeared in Gentyll Manly Cokere in the Pepys Manuscript 1047, dating from around 1490.

The Beinecke manuscript describes a saffron-yellow "mortruys" of mixed chicken and pork, thickened with egg:

Take brawn of capons & porke, sodyn & groundyn; tempyr hit up with milk of almondes drawn with the broth. Set hit on the fyre; put to sigure & safron. When hit boyleth, tak som of thy milk, boylying, fro the fyre & aley hit up with yolkes of eyron that hit be ryght chargeaunt; styre hit wel for quelling. Put therto that othyr, & ster hem togedyr, & serve hem forth as mortruys; and strew on poudr of gynger.

The name of the dish most likely derives from the mortar and pestle used to prepare it. Terry Breverton, in The Tudor Kitchen: What the Tudors Ate & Drank (2015), suggests putting the mortis into individual ramekins and chilling them before serving.
