= Devilled kidneys =

Dish based on kidneys

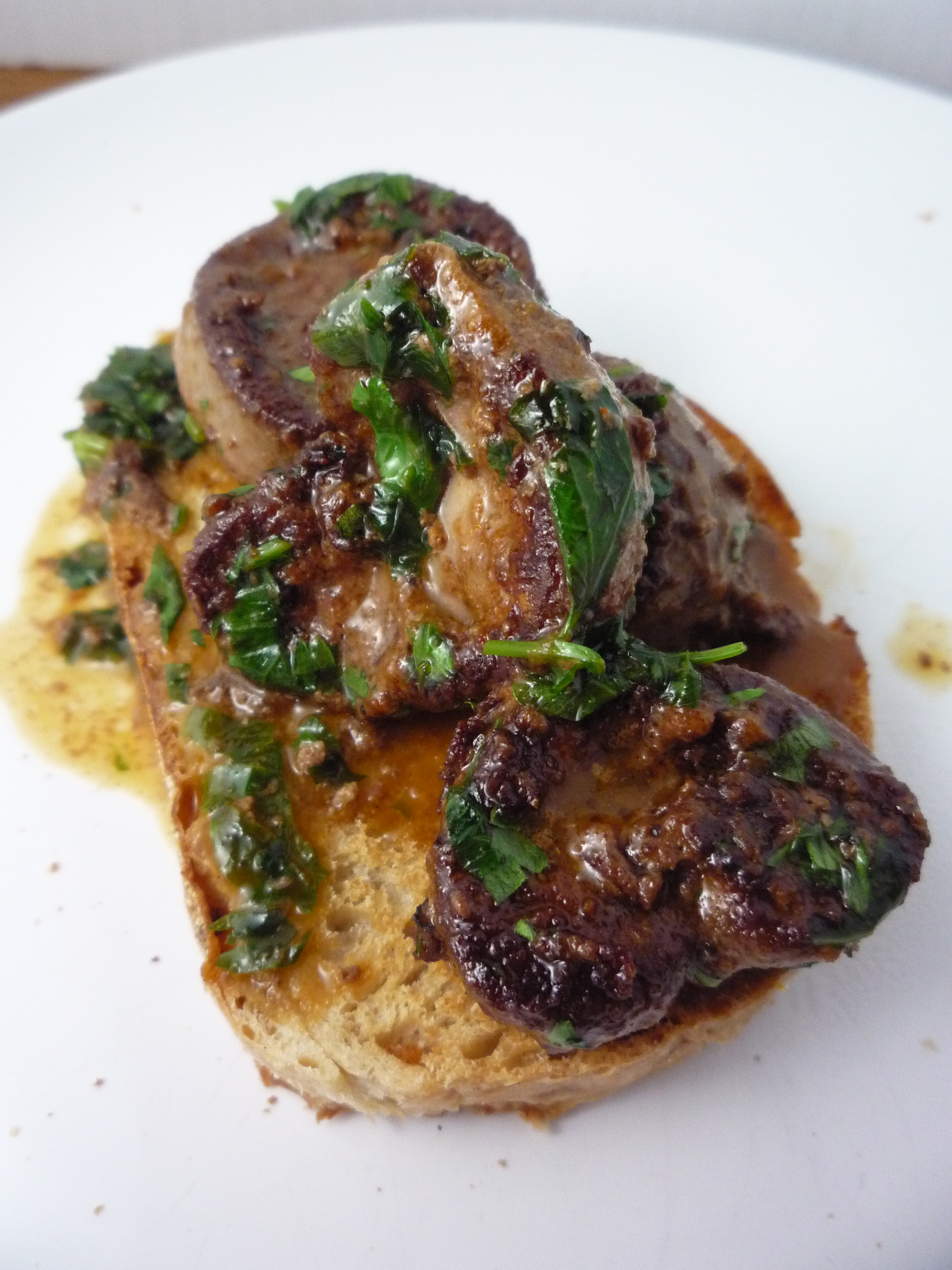
- Devilled kidneys on toast
- Course: Breakfast
- Place of origin: United Kingdom
- Serving temperature: Warm
- Main ingredients: Lamb kidneys
- Other information: 18th century onwards

Devilled kidneys is a Victorian British breakfast dish consisting of lamb's kidneys cooked in a spiced sauce, referred to as "devilling". It has since become more frequently used as a supper-time dish.

== Description ==
The devilling mixture consists of Worcestershire sauce, mustard, butter, cayenne pepper, salt and black pepper.

James Boswell described devilling during the 18th century, although it was not until the 19th and 20th centuries that devilled kidneys grew in popularity as a breakfast dish. During the Edwardian era, the dish was typically served in gentlemen's clubs, and was part of a cuisine which also included items such as kedgeree or kippers. In the modern era it has mostly been promoted as a supper dish instead of at breakfast.

=== Variations ===
British celebrity chef Rick Stein created a recipe combining devilled kidneys with wild mushrooms to create an entrée. The dish is often included in cookbooks, with versions gracing the covers of books by the Canteen restaurant, as well as books by The Hairy Bikers. Chef Fergus Henderson described Caroline Conran's version of devilled kidneys as "the best recipe, ever!", and Marco Pierre White created devils kidneys for the celebrities in one of his seasons of ITV's Hell's Kitchen.

== See also ==
- Deviled egg
- Deviled ham
- Deviled crab
- List of lamb dishes
