= Deviled crab =

Crab meat croquette

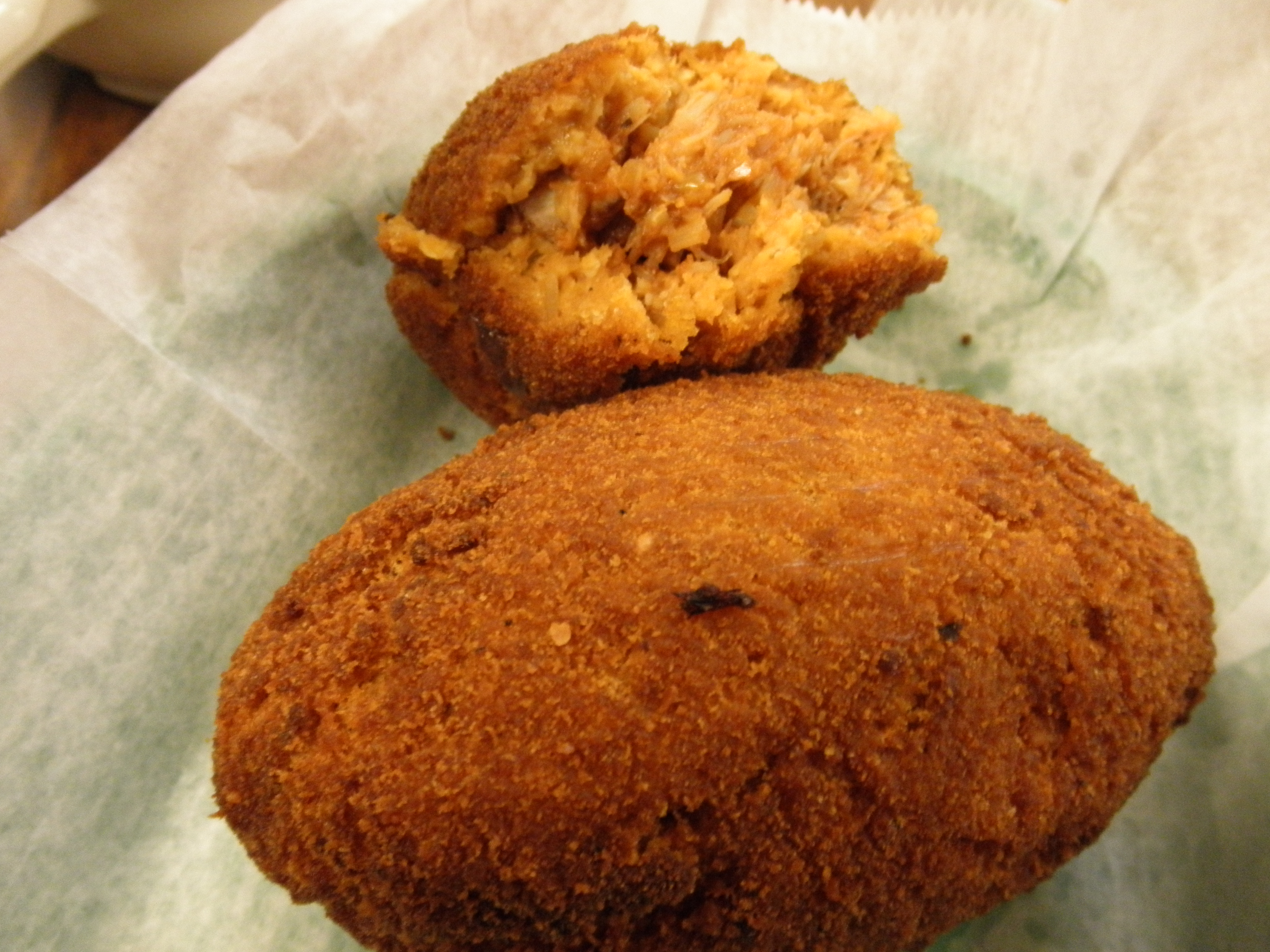
Deviled crab from historic Ybor City, Tampa

Deviled crab (croqueta de jaiba in Spanish) is a crab meat croquette. Deviled crab croquettes originated in Tampa, Florida, where they were developed in the Spanish, Cuban and Italian immigrant community of Ybor City. It is typically served for lunch or as a snack, and it is meant to be eaten with one hand.

Deviled crabs are somewhat similar to boardwalk-style Maryland crab cakes. Differences include the oblong shape, the seasonings used, and the preferred method of eating (by hand). Since deviled crabs were designed to be hand-held, they are packed together more densely than a crab cake so as to not come apart easily.

== Preparation and description ==
The deviled crab is prepared by slowly sautéing blue crab meat with a seasoning sauce made with tomatoes, onions, peppers, and various other flavors. This seasoning sauce is a version of a Cuban-style enchilada / sofrito sauce, known locally as "chilau". Once most of the liquid is gone, the cooked crab meat is rolled in breadcrumbs (traditionally stale Cuban bread) and hand-formed into the approximate shape of a rugby football or small potato, then deep fried until brown. Early versions of the recipe usually contained more spicy chili pepper than modern versions, thus giving them the appellation "deviled" in English. As the croqueta's spiciness was toned down to account for a wider range of tastes, various pepper sauces became a common condiment utilized by those who liked their deviled crabs hot.

== History ==
Deviled crabs originated in the Spanish/Cuban/Italian immigrant community of Ybor City, Tampa, Florida during a late-1920s strike in the area's cigar factories. Since blue crabs were plentiful in the nearby waters of Tampa Bay and Cuban bread was cheap, unknown home chefs seeking an inexpensive meal combined these ingredients with their own seasonings to make Tampa-style crab croquettes. These croquetas de jaiba became widely popular after the strike, when local entrepreneurs began selling their own versions of the snack from pushcarts and bicycles along Tampa sidewalks.

Deviled crabs are still popular in the Tampa Bay area, especially in lunch cafes and restaurants that serve Cuban and/or Spanish cuisine in Ybor City and West Tampa. Smaller crab croquetas are commonly served as appetizers while larger versions can be a meal onto themselves.

== Other versions ==
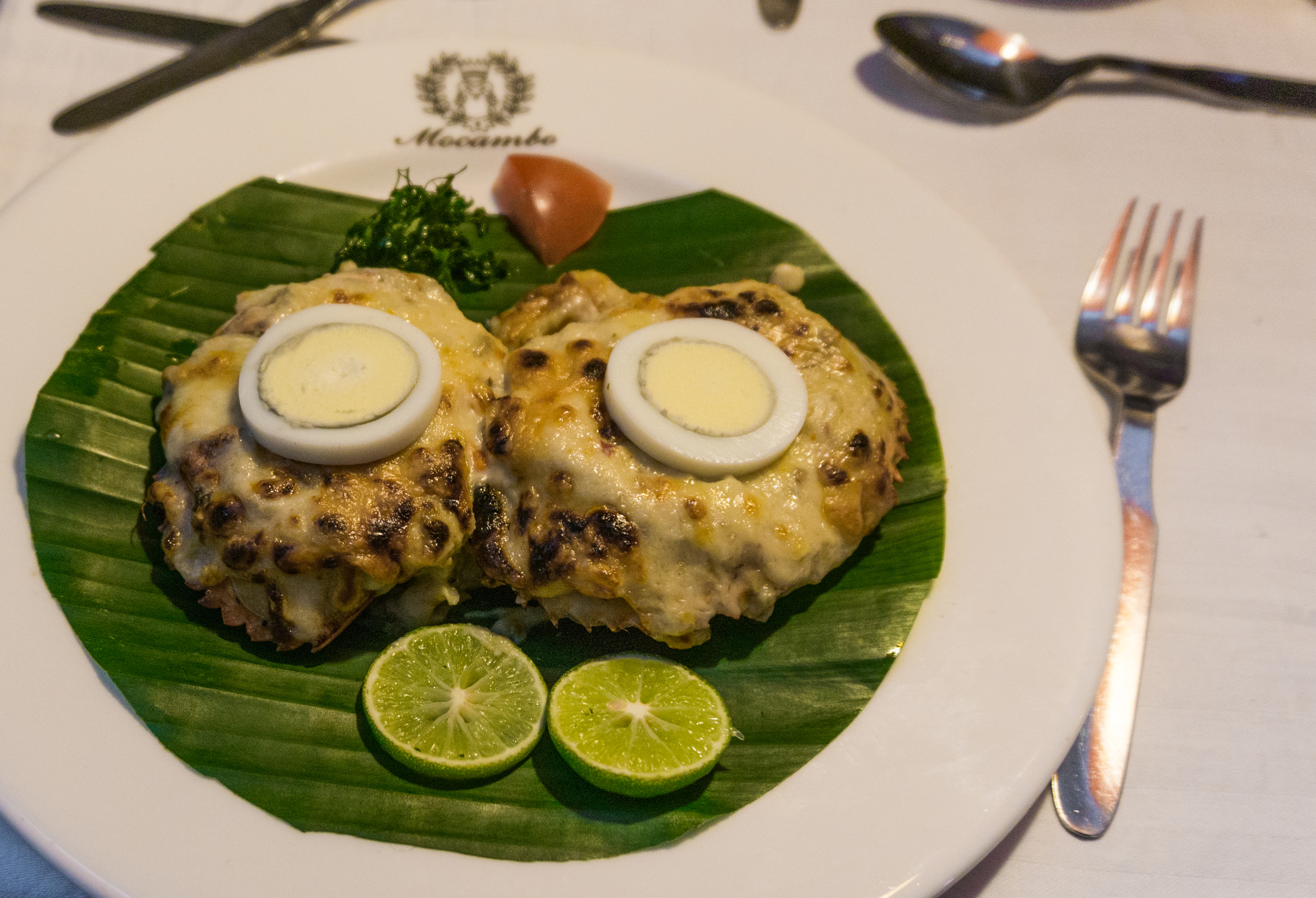
Deviled crab served on halved shells at Mocambo Calcutta, India

Up the U.S. Atlantic coast from Georgia to the Chesapeake Bay region, "deviled crab" refers to a different dish entirely. In this version, crab meat (usually blue crab) is taken out of the shell, mixed and cooked with bread crumbs and spices with a consistency similar to loose crab cake, and then returned to a halved crab shell to be served and eaten with a fork or spoon. Another in-shell version of the deviled crab that is served in India and along the coastlines of other south Asian countries is more similar to the Chesapeake deviled crab than the Tampa deviled crab.

== See also ==
- Deviled egg
- Deviled ham
- Devilled kidneys
- List of crab dishes
- List of seafood dishes
