= Seychellois cuisine =

Culinary traditions of Seychelles

The location of Seychelles

Seychellois cuisine is the cuisine of the Republic of Seychelles, an archipelago country consisting of 115 islands off the Indian Ocean coast of Africa. Fish plays a prominent part in the country's cuisine because of its location in the Indian Ocean. Seychellois cuisine has been influenced by African, British, French, Spanish, Indian and Chinese cuisines.

== History ==
The Seychelles archipelago had no permanent inhabitants before 1770, when they were settled by the French. They were transferred to the British in 1814, under the Treaty of Paris. In the early colonial years, sugarcane and other labour-intensive crops dominated the islands, farmed by enslaved people. After slavery was abolished in 1835, coconuts became the dominant crop on the islands, coconuts also came to dominate the local cuisine.

The Seychelles' location as a trading post added further ingredients and traditions to the local food. Malagasy slaves from Madagascar brought ancient Austronesian cooking methods, and Chinese and Indian merchants brought spices and fruits that round out modern coconut curries. The cuisine that emerged from this mixing pot is locally known as Creole cuisine, reflecting its complex origin.

== Common ingredients ==
Seychellois dishes are often based around seafood, including fish, shellfish, and octopus, coupled with rice. Fish dishes are cooked in several ways, such as steamed, grilled, wrapped in banana leaves, baked, salted and smoked. Additional food staples include shark, breadfruit, and mangoes.

Curries (kari in Seychelles Creole) are a particularly common style of meal. Fish or octopus curries are traditional dishes. Other meats are cooked into curries as well, including chicken and fruit bat. Coconut milk is a common ingredient, due in part to the extensive coconut plantations of the colonial era.

The spices of Seychellois cuisine are a mix of Indian, European, Asian, and African, reflecting the islands' location and trading history. Ginger, lemongrass, coriander and tamarind are common spices. Curry powder, curry leaves, cinnamon bark, and even cinnamon leaves can all be included in dishes.

Dishes are often cooked with, or accompanied by, local Seychellois chili sauces, known as lasos piman.

Fresh fish and fruits are sold by street vendors and in markets. Because of the small size and population of the islands, the set of available fresh ingredients can be variable.

== Common foods and dishes ==
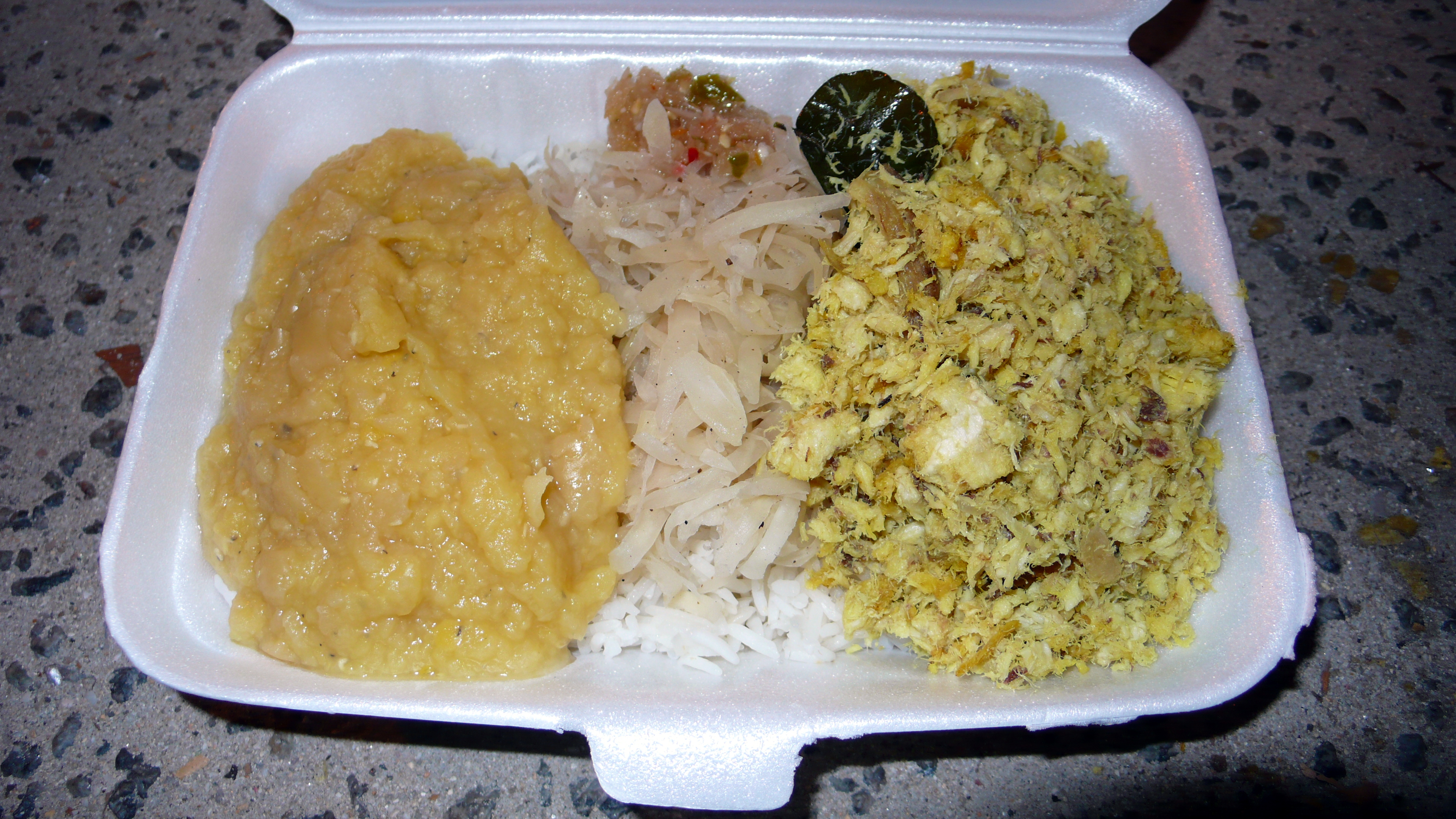
Shark chutney (right), with lentils and shredded green papaya on rice at a market on Mahé, Seychelles

Example dishes include:

- Curries
  - kari koko - Coconut curry, made with various proteins
  - kari bernik - limpet curry
  - Fish curry
- Dhal (lentils)
- Saffron rice
- Ladob is eaten either as a savoury dish or as a dessert. The dessert version usually consists of ripe plantain and sweet potatoes (but may also include cassava, breadfruit or even corosol) boiled with coconut milk, sugar, nutmeg and vanilla in the form of a pod until the fruit is soft and the sauce is creamy. The savoury dish usually includes salted fish, cooked in a similar fashion to the dessert version, with plantain, kasava and breadfruit, but with salt used in place of sugar (and omitting vanilla).
- Satini reken—Shark chutney typically consists of boiled skinned shark, finely mashed, and cooked with squeezed bilenbi juice and lime. It is mixed with sautéed onion and spices.
- rougail saucisse (or sosis rougay) - sausages in tomato/onion sauce
- Bouyon bred—fish soup, made with greens, related to French bouillabaisse
- Bourzwa griye—grilled red snapper
- Cassava pudding and cakes
- Kat-kat banane—green bananas and fish cooked in coconut milk
- Salad palmis—palm heart salad, prepared with coconut palm

== Beverages ==
Coconut water and fresh juices are some of the beverages in Seychellois cuisine. Alcoholic drinks include the palm wine calou (or kalou), bakka rum and beers produced in the country such as Seybrew and Eku. Wine is obtainable at most Seychelles restaurants.

== Food industry ==
The Indian Ocean Tuna company's processing plant is one of the largest tuna canneries in the world. It is located in Victoria, Seychelles.

== See also ==
- African cuisine
- Index of Seychelles-related articles
