= West Indies salad =

Variation of crab meat ceviche

West Indies Salad is a variation of crab meat ceviche that originated in the Mobile, Alabama area. West Indies salad was created by the restaurateur William "Bill" Bayley, Sr., the owner of Bayley's Steak House south of Mobile on Dauphin Island Parkway, in 1947. He was inspired while working as a ship steward on a ship docked in the Cayman Islands.

There are variations of the recipe, but the ingredients should always include lump blue crab meat, diced sweet white onions, cider vinegar, salt, pepper, and vegetable oil (traditionally Wesson oil). There are recipes in the cookbook of the Junior League of Mobile (first published in the 1964 version of this cookbook) and more recently in the Times Picayune of New Orleans. The dish is offered in many restaurants in the Mobile Bay area.

== See also ==
- List of crab dishes
- List of seafood dishes
