= Seafood basket =

Fried fish dish

Seafood Basket
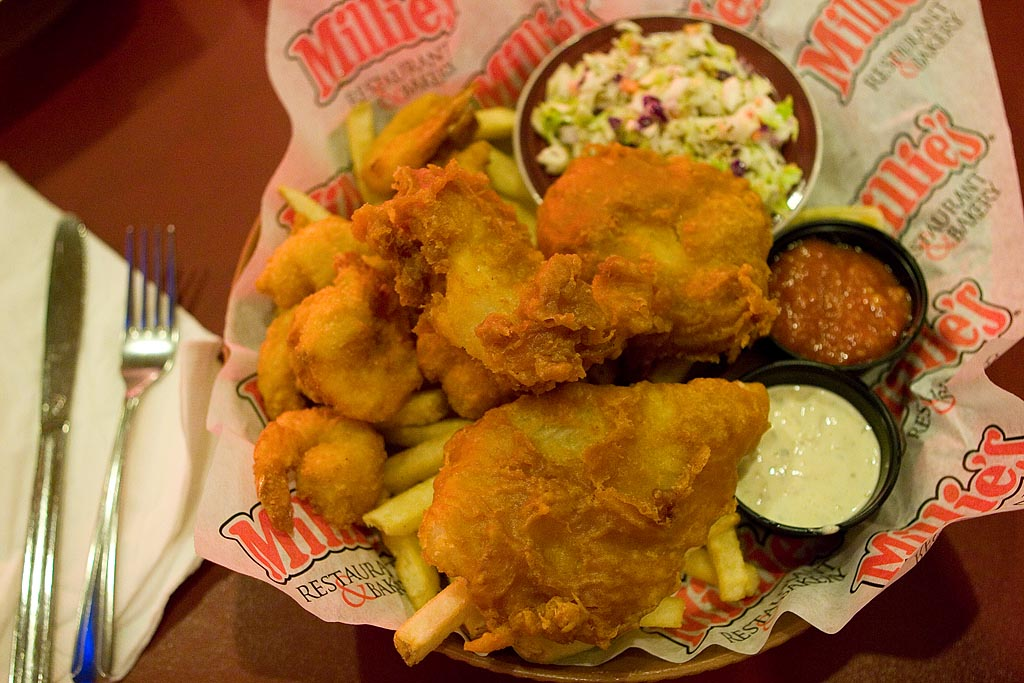
- A seafood basket with fried fish, shrimp and chips, coleslaw and dipping sauces
- Alternative names: Fisherman's basket
- Place of origin: United Kingdom
- Main ingredients: French fries, Fish fillet, Calamari, Tartare sauce, Tomato Sauce

A seafood basket, also known as the fisherman's basket, is a fried dish usually consisting of a variety of fried seafoods including fish fillet, prawns and calamari. Additional foods used can include fried scallops, oysters and crab sticks. The dish typically includes one or more dipping sauces, such as cocktail sauce, and may include chips. It is a similar dish to fish and chips.

== See also ==
- List of seafood dishes
- List of deep fried foods
