= Ladob =

Seychellois food

Ladob is a dish typically consisting of plantains or sweet potatoes, eaten in the Seychelles, either as a savory dish or as a dessert.

It was originally a dish eaten in large amounts by the early arrivals to the island due to the ingredients being in plentiful supply. It is now a staple part of the diet, many eating the dish several times a week.

The dessert version usually consists of ripe plantain and sweet potatoes (but may also include cassava, breadfruit or even corossol) boiled with coconut milk, sugar, nutmeg and vanilla in the form of a pod until the fruit is soft and the sauce is creamy.

The savory version usually includes salted fish, cooked in a similar fashion to the dessert version, with plantain, cassava and breadfruit, but with salt used in place of sugar (and omitting vanilla).

Ladob can be served hot or cold.

== See also ==
- Cuisine of Seychelles
