= Pulpo a la campechana =

Mexican dish made with octopus

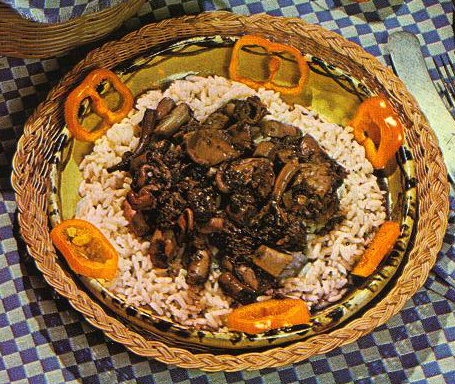
Pulpo a la campechana

Pulpo a la campechana is a traditional dish in Mexican cuisine. It consists of chopped octopus that is slowly boiled in water with its ink, vinegar, onion, garlic. The cooked octopus is mixed with a preparation of tomatoes, onion, garlic, coriander leaves, chile ancho and wine. It is served with white rice.
