= Pastel de jaiba =

Chilean crab casserole

- Pastel de jaiba
- Alternative names: Chilean crab pie
- Type: Casserole
- Place of origin: Chile
- Associated cuisine: Chilean cuisine
- Serving temperature: Hot
- Main ingredients: Crab meat, white bread, milk or cream, onion
- Ingredients generally used: Cheese, garlic, spices

Pastel de jaiba is a Chilean crab casserole. Although pastel can mean a pie or cake, the dish is generally crustless: a creamy crab mixture is baked in individual clay pots or soufflé dishes with a topping of grated cheese.

== Preparation ==
Liz Caskey's recipe sautés onion and garlic with crab meat, paprika and oregano. White bread soaked in half-and-half is puréed and stirred into the crab mixture, which is portioned into clay pots, sprinkled with Parmesan and baked until golden. Milk can replace the half-and-half for a lighter texture.

A version published by Deutsche Welle uses the same basic bread-and-crab method but adds white wine, fish stock, cumin and merquén, a smoked-chilli seasoning. It is finished with cream and Parmesan and baked in terracotta bowls.

== Cultural role ==
Caskey describes pastel de jaiba as a rustic preparation served in clay pots by restaurants along Chile's Pacific coast. Chile's official tourism website also lists it among the prepared foods found in the country's markets.

A recipe for pastel de jaiba de Caleta Chañaral was included in the Chilean government's Tu receta, tu historia collection. The 2016 project gathered home recipes and personal accounts to document culinary traditions transmitted within families and local communities.
