= Mực rang muối =

Vietnamese five-spice squid dish

- Course: Main course
- Place of origin: Vietnam
- Associated cuisine: Vietnamese
- Cooking time: 50 minutes
- Main ingredients: Squid
- Ingredients generally used: Eggs, salt, black bell pepper, spice
- Food energy (per dish serving): 810 kcal (3,400 kJ)
Nutritional value
(per dish serving)
- Protein: 11 g
- Fat: 13 g
- Carbohydrate: 9 g

Mực rang muối (English: salt toasted squid) is a dish in Vietnamese cuisine.
