= Shark chutney =

Seychellois dish

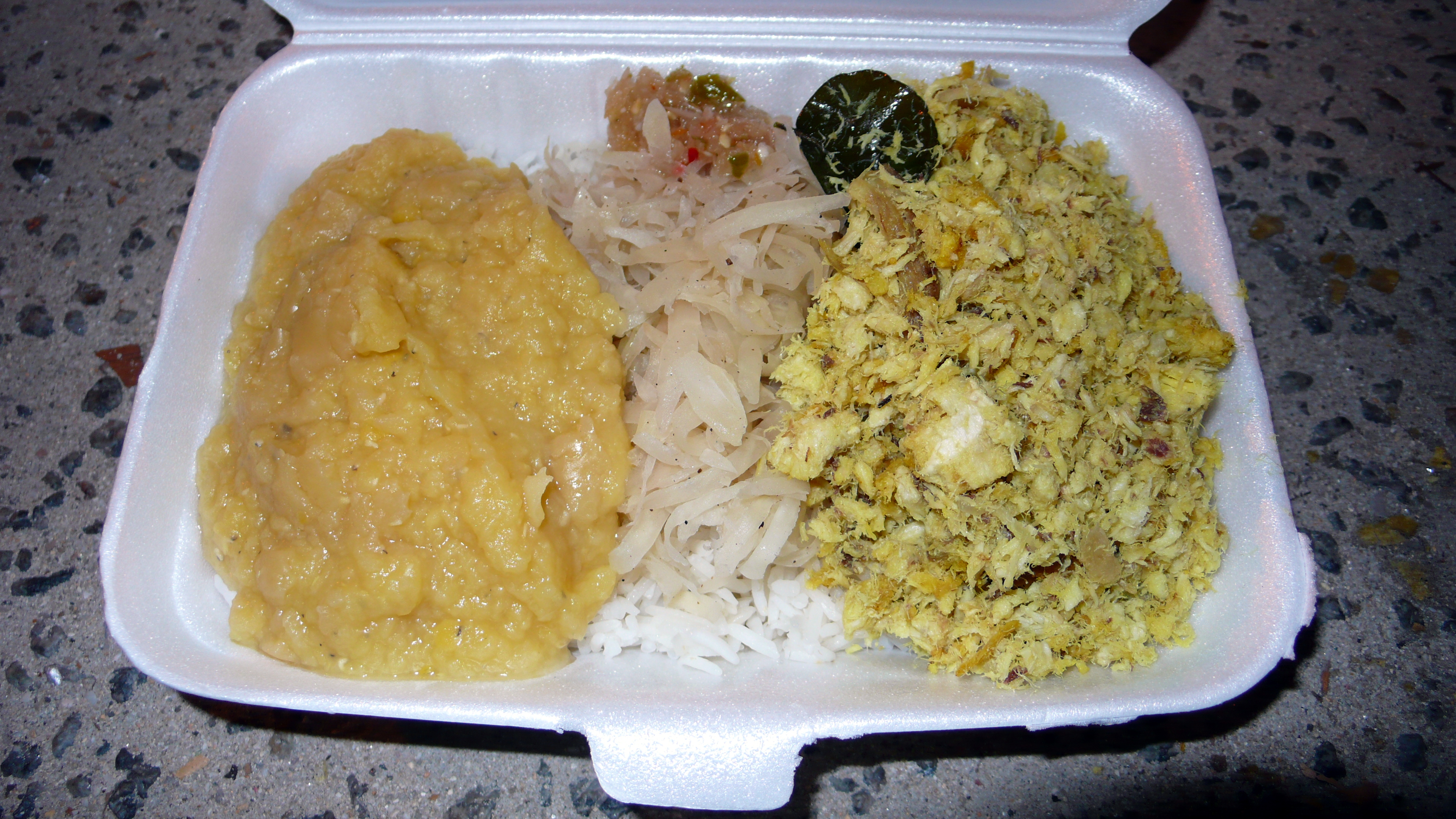
Shark chutney (right), with lentils and shredded green papaya on rice at a market on Mahé, Seychelles

Shark chutney is a dish eaten in the Seychelles. It typically consists of 1 kilogram (2.2 lb) of boiled skinned shark, finely mashed, and cooked with squeezed bilimbi juice and lime. This in turn is mixed with onion, pepper, salt and turmeric. The onion is fried and it is cooked in oil.

== See also ==
- Cuisine of Seychelles
