= List of types of seafood =

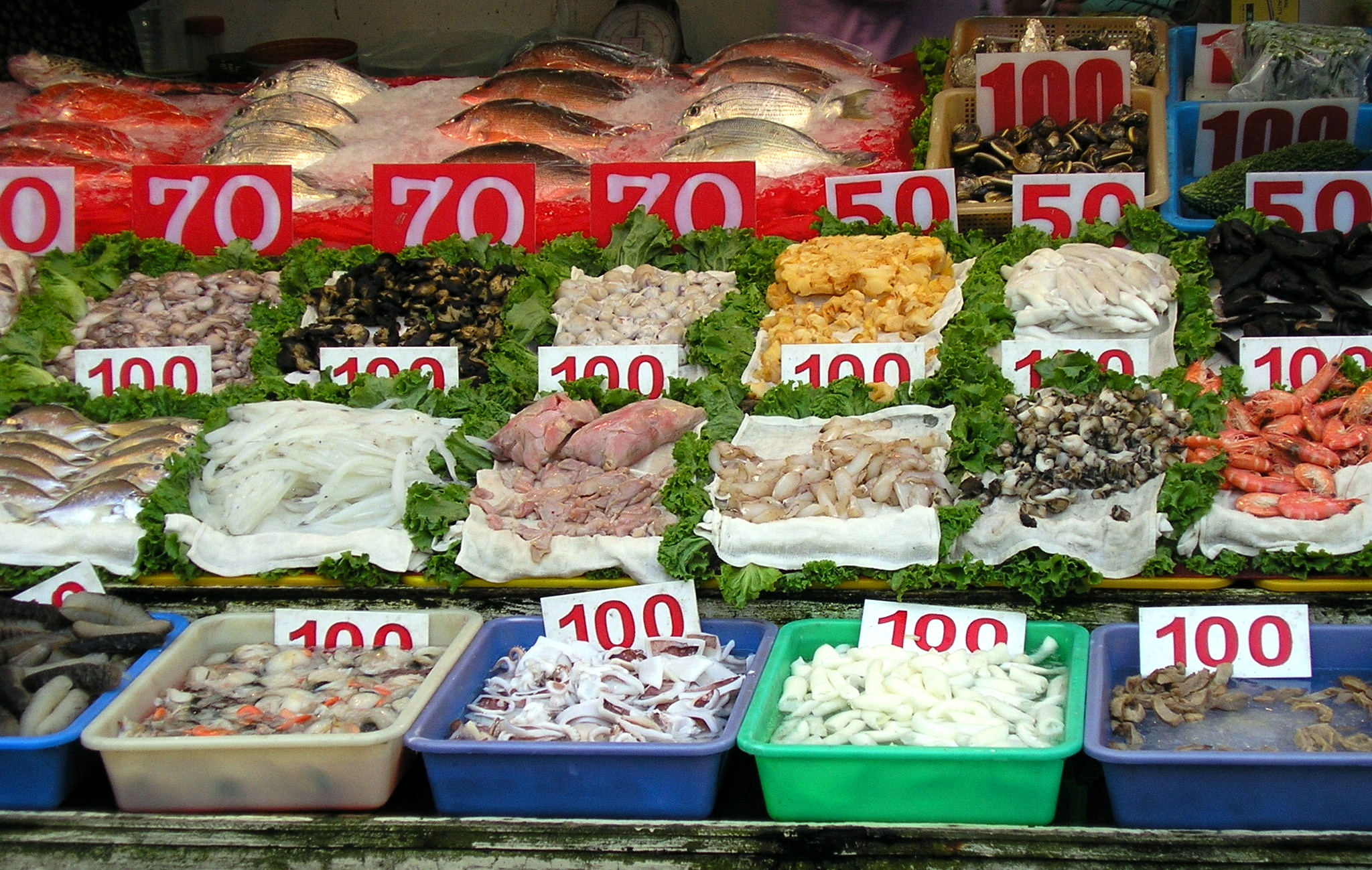
Fresh seafood on sale in Kaohsiung, Taiwan

The following is a list of types of seafood. Seafood is any form of sea life regarded as food by humans. It prominently includes shellfish, and roe. Shellfish include various species of molluscs, crustaceans, and echinoderms. In most parts of the world, fish are generally not considered seafood even if they are from the sea. In the United States, the term "seafood" is extended to fresh water organisms eaten by humans, so any edible aquatic life may be broadly referred to as seafood in the United States. Historically, sea mammals such as whales and dolphins have been consumed as food, though that happens to a lesser extent in modern times. Edible sea plants, such as some seaweeds and microalgae, are widely eaten as seafood around the world, especially in Asia (see the category of edible seaweeds).

== Fish ==
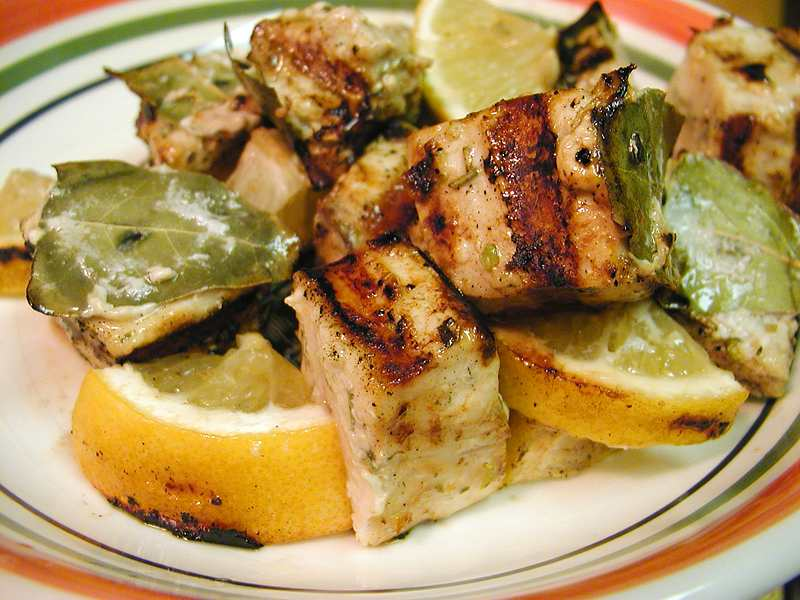
Marinated grilled swordfish

- Anchovies
- Anglerfish
- Barracuda
- Basa
- Bass (see also striped bass)
- Black cod
- Bluefish
- Bombay duck
- Bonito
- Bream
- Brill
- Burbot
- Catfish
- Cod (see also Pacific cod and Atlantic cod)
- Dogfish
- Dorade
- Eel
- Flounder
- Grouper
- Haddock
- Hake
- Halibut
- Herring
- Ilish
- John Dory
- Lamprey
- Lingcod (see also Common ling)
- Mackerel (see also Horse mackerel)
- Mahi Mahi
- Monkfish
- Mullet
- Orange roughy
- Pacific rudderfish (Japanese butterfish)
- Pacific saury
- Parrotfish
- Patagonian toothfish (also called Chilean sea bass)
- Perch
- Pike
- Pollock
- Pomfret
- Pompano
- Pufferfish (see also Fugu)
- Sablefish
- Salmon
- Sanddab, particularly Pacific sanddab
- Sardine
- Sea bass
- Sea bream
- Shad (see also alewife and American shad)
- Shark
- Skate
- Smelt
- Snakehead
- Snapper (see also rockfish, rock cod and Pacific snapper)
- Sole
- Sprat
- Stromateidae (butterfish)
- Sturgeon
- Surimi
- Swordfish
- Tilapia
- Tilefish
- Trout (see also rainbow trout)
- Tuna (see also albacore tuna, yellowfin tuna, bigeye tuna, bluefin tuna and dogtooth tuna)
- Turbot
- Wahoo
- Whitefish (see also stockfish)
- Whiting
- Witch (righteye flounder)
- Yellowtail (also called Japanese amberjack)

== Roe ==
- Caviar (sturgeon roe)
- Ikura (salmon roe)
- Tobiko (flying-fish roe)
- Kazunoko (herring roe)
- Masago (capelin roe)
- Lumpfish roe
- Shad roe

== Shellfish ==
=== Crustaceans ===
- Barnacles (Austromegabalanus psittacus)
- Crabs
- Craw/Crayfish
- Lobsters
- Shrimps/Prawns

=== Mollusca ===
- Abalone
- Cockle
- Clam
- Loco
- Mussel
- Oyster
- Periwinkle
- Scallop (see also bay scallop and sea scallop)
- Conch (Snails)

=== Cephalopods ===
- Cuttlefish
- Octopus
- Nautilus
- Squid

== Echinoderms ==
These are common in some Asian cuisines

- Sea cucumber
- Uni (sea urchin "roe")

== Medusozoa ==
Some species of jellyfish are edible and used as a source of food.

== Tunicates (sea squirts) ==
Microcosmus sabatieri, also known as sea fig or violet, is eaten in parts of Europe.

Pyura chilensis, known as piure, eaten in Peru and Chile

Halocynthia roretzi, also known as sea pineapple, usually eaten in Japan

== See also ==
- Fish as food – Fish eaten by humans
- List of seafood dishes
- Seafood restaurant – Restaurant mostly serving fish from the sea
