= Thomas Dawson (cook) =

English author (fl. 1585–1620)

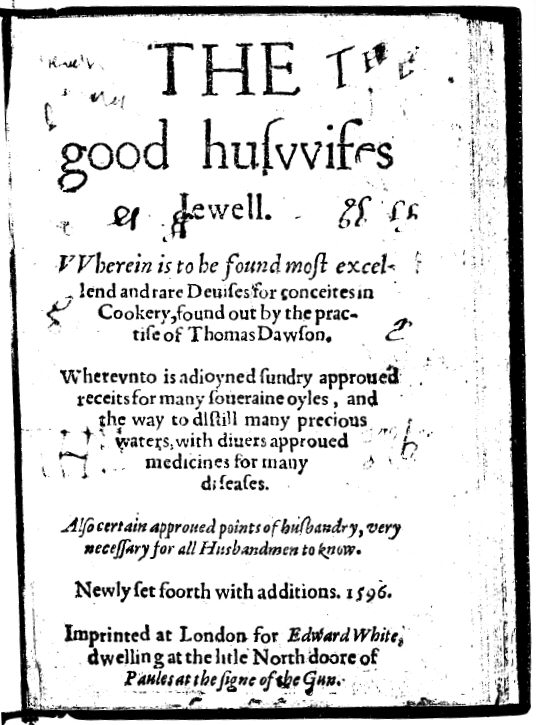
Title page of 1596 edition of Thomas Dawson's The Good Huswifes Jewell, first published 1585

Thomas Dawson (fl. 1585–1620) was an English author of cookery and housekeeping books.

== Life ==
Thomas Dawson was an author of popular cookery and housekeeping books in the late 16th century. His best-known works include The Good Huswifes Jewell (1585), The Booke of Carving and Sewing (1597), and his Booke of Cookerie (1620).

== Books ==
Dawson's Good Huswifes Jewell gives recipes for making fruit tarts using fruits as varied as apple, peach, cherry, damson, pear, and mulberry. For stuffing for meat and poultry, or as he says "to farse all things", he recommends using the herbs thyme, hyssop, and parsley, mixed with egg yolk, white bread, raisins or barberries, and spices including cloves, mace, cinnamon and ginger, all in the same dish. His recipe for a salad with a vinaigrette dressing runs as follows (from the 1596 edition):

To make a Sallet of all kinde of hearbes.

Take your hearbes and picke them very fine into faire water, and picke your flowers by themselues, and washe them al cleane, and swing them in a strainer, and when you put them into a dish, mingle them with Cowcumbers or Lemmons payred and sliced, and scrape Suger, and put in vineger and Oyle, and throwe the flowers on the toppe of the sallet, and of euery sorte of the aforesaide things, and garnish the dish about with the forsaide thinges, and harde Egges boyled and laide about the dish and vpon the sallet.

The celebrity chef Clarissa Dickson Wright comments on Dawson's trifle that it differs from the modern recipe, as it consists only of "a pinte of thicke Creame", seasoned with sugar, ginger and rosewater, and warmed gently for serving. She notes, also from the Good Huswife's Jewell, that the Elizabethans had a strong liking for sweet things.

Dawson's recipes included medicines, some of which involved sympathetic magic. The Good Huswife's Jewell described "a tart to provoke courage in either man or woman", calling for the brains of male sparrows. Torn sinews are healed by taking "worms while they be nice", crushing them and laying them on to the sore "and it will knit the sinew that be broken in two".
