= Clam cake =

Seafood dish

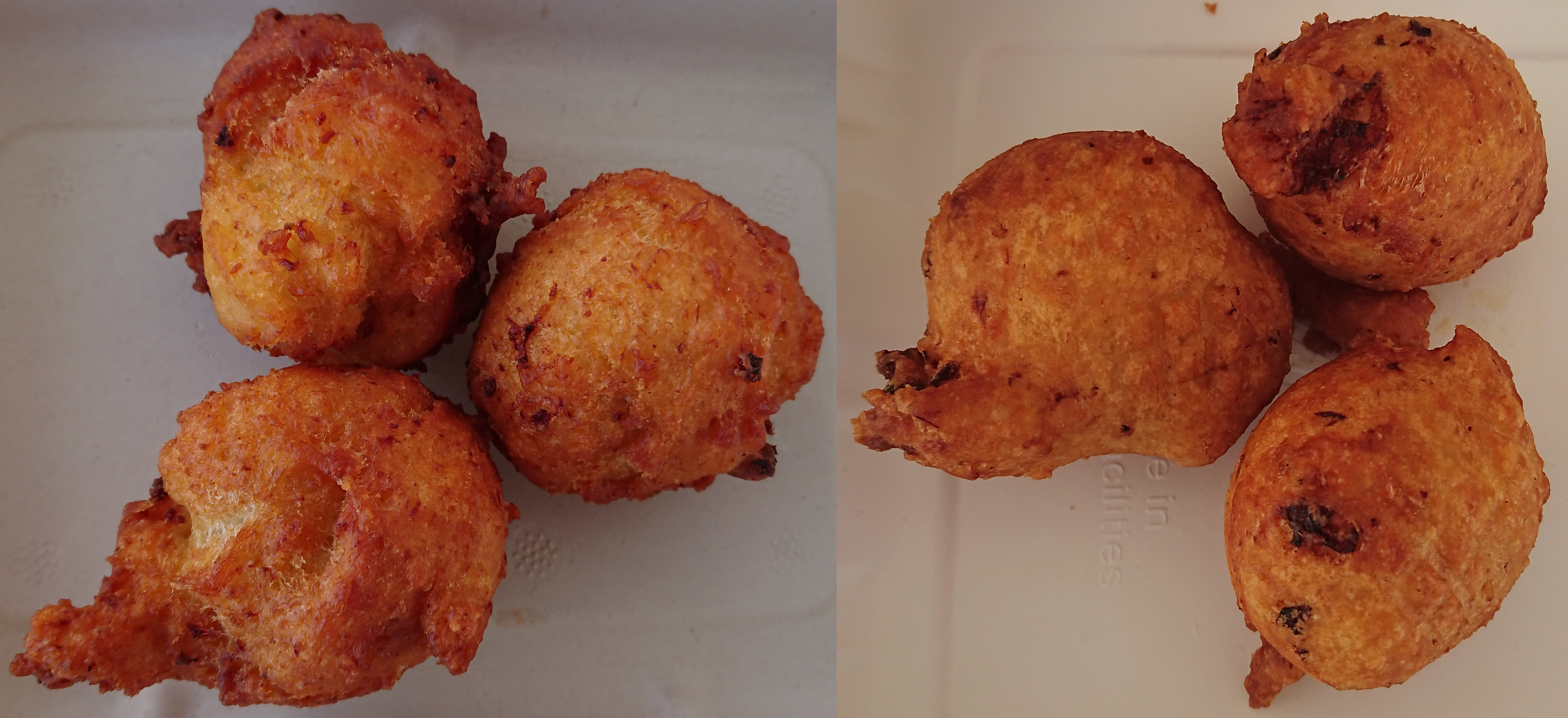
- Alternative names: Clam fritter
- Type: Seafood
- Place of origin: United States
- Region or state: New England; Rhode Island

Clam cakes (also known as clam fritters) are a part of New England cuisine, most commonly found in Rhode Island although they can also be found in Connecticut, Maine, and Massachusetts. They are balls of battered clams which have been deep-fried. On the Maine coast, clam cakes are formed into large, flat patties and fried.

Clam cakes are often served at take-out food outlets or other informal settings as finger food, as part of a meal consisting of several clam cakes, french fries, and cole slaw. This is often served alongside clam chowder. The cakes tend to be eaten dry, dipped in clam chowder or tartar sauce.

Clam fritters are particularly popular during clamming season when clams are in abundance and it is legal during limited, specified periods for private citizens to dig their own. The surplus of clams must be used up quickly so they do not spoil.

== Preparation ==
Each clam cake is a deep-fried ball-shaped mixture containing chopped clam (usually quahog) combined with various other ingredients to give it a firm, hushpuppy-like consistency once fried. The batter is made from flour, milk, clam juice, eggs and a leavening agent, typically baking powder. Some recipes may include cornmeal.

== History ==
Local legend holds that clam cakes were first served at Aunt Carrie's, a seafood restaurant in Narragansett, Rhode Island in 1920. According to this legend, Carrie Cooper invented clam cakes by adding fresh clams to her corn fritter recipe, thus inventing clam fritters. Clam cake recipes are actually as old as the 19th century.

== See also ==
- Crab cake
- Fishcake
- List of clam dishes
- List of seafood dishes
- Stuffed clam
