= Clam pie =

Type of meat pie

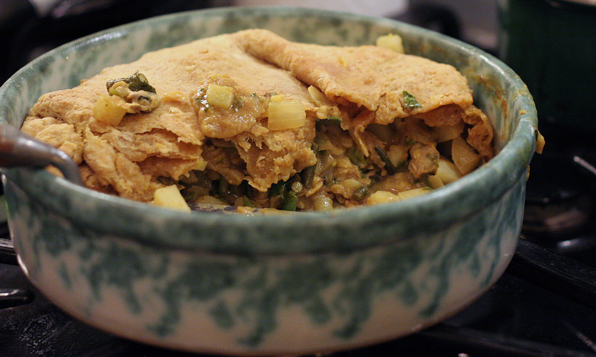
A clam pie prepared with curry spices

A clam pie is a savory meat pie prepared using clams, especially quahogs, as a primary ingredient; it is a part of the cuisine of New England. It likely predated the English settlements in Southern New England, having been a feature of indigenous peoples' diets.

== Overview ==
A clam pie is a savory pie prepared using clams as a main ingredient. Ingredients in addition to whole or chopped clams and pie crust can include potatoes, corn, onion, celery, garlic, clam juice, milk, eggs, hard-boiled eggs, butter, crushed crackers, seasonings, salt and pepper. Fresh or canned clams can be used to prepare the dish, and flour can be used to thicken the mixture. The dish is typically cooked by baking. Clam pie is a part of the cuisine of New England.

== History ==
There is evidence that the Wampanoag tribe of present-day Southern New England and Cape Cod ate pies made from clams before encountering English Settlers in the early 1600s. Pies had been common in medieval Europe and the English settlers to the Plymouth Colony cooked a variety of pies because it was a sure way to preserve foods, so it kept meats and seafood fresh through the long winters before refrigeration.

=== Bonac clam pie ===
In Eastern Long Island, New York, there is a well-known version of clam pie, called Bonac clam pie, after the Bonackers, or descendants of the first white settlers of the area who settled around Accabonac Harbor. For many generations, the inhabitants of this part of East Hampton were clammers and fishermen. The recipes used here are handed down from generation to generation and thus vary in ingredients across generations and family lines.

== See also ==
- Fish pie
- List of clam dishes
