= Clams oreganata =

Italian-American seafood dish

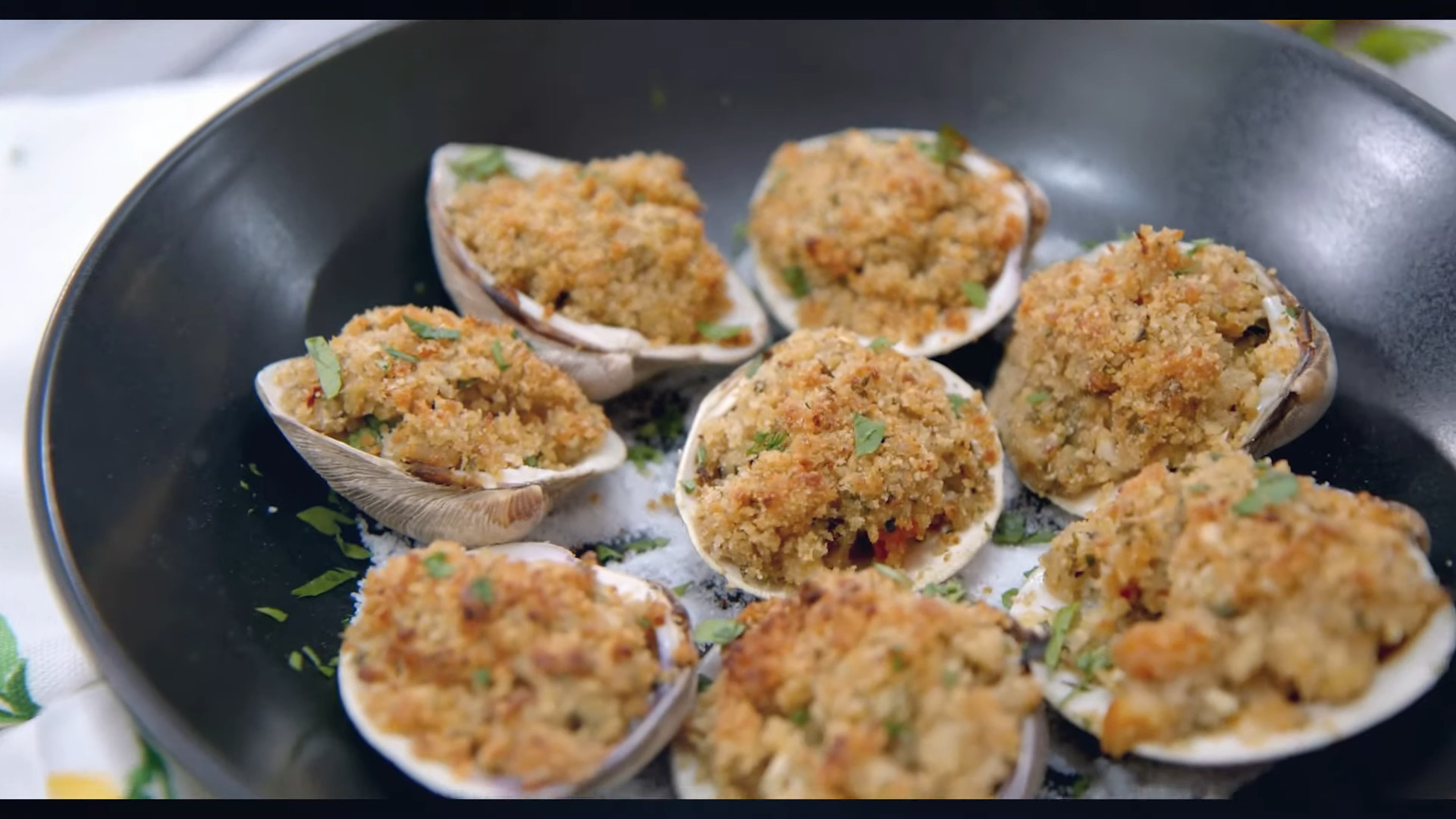
- Course: Appetizer
- Place of origin: New York City
- Associated cuisine: Italian-American
- Serving temperature: Hot
- Main ingredients: Clams
- Ingredients generally used: Breading, garlic, seasonings
- Similar dishes: Stuffed clam

Clams oreganata or baked clams is an Italian-American seafood dish served most commonly as an appetizer. In the dish, clams (usually six or twelve) are topped with bread crumbs (usually moistened with olive oil or butter), oregano, garlic, and sometimes other ingredients, and baked. Lemon juice is often squeezed onto the clams immediately before eating. The name "oreganata" refers to the addition of oregano.

Clams oreganata is commonly eaten on Christmas Eve during the Feast of the Seven Fishes, a traditional Italian-American meal centered around various seafood dishes.

According to food writer Arthur Schwartz, clams oreganata are descended from the Neapolitan dish cozze al gratin/cozze arriganate. The dish is only sometimes made with clams, and is more often made with mussels, a much more common bivalve in the Campania region where clams are very small. It is served as an antipasto, and is less heavy than the Italian-American dish.

== See also ==
- Clams casino
- List of clam dishes
- List of seafood dishes
- New England clam bake
