= Steamed clams =

Seafood dish consisting of clams

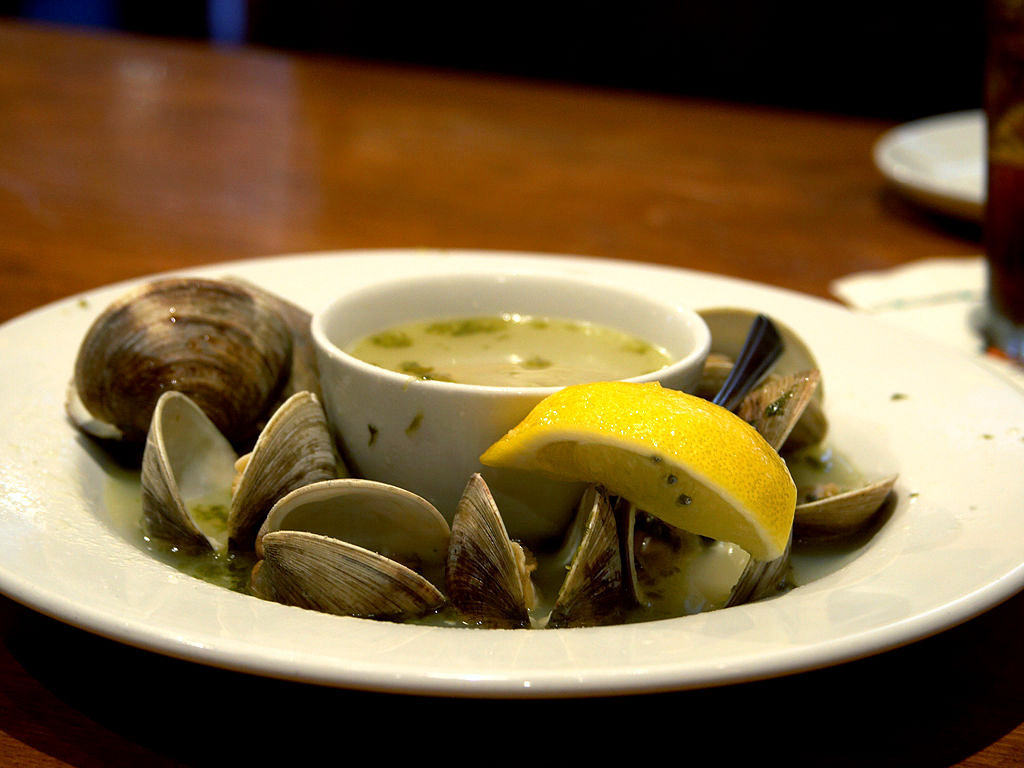
- Steamed clams
- Type: seafood
- Place of origin: United States

Steamed clams is a seafood dish consisting of clams cooked by steaming.

In the United States, steamed clams are usually made with small soft-shell clams (Mya arenaria) called steamers, and sometimes with other shellfish harvested and served along the East Coast and in New England.

Hard shell clams, sometimes known as quahogs, can also be steamed. They are categorized by size— the smaller ones are called littlenecks, medium-sized ones topnecks, the larger ones cherrystones, and the largest are simply called quahogs.

The clams used for steaming are usually cooked live. If in a hard shell, the clam should be closed when purchased and should open after being cooked. Soft shell clams are open slightly (agape) while alive. Larger chowder clams are not typically used for steaming.

== Preparation ==
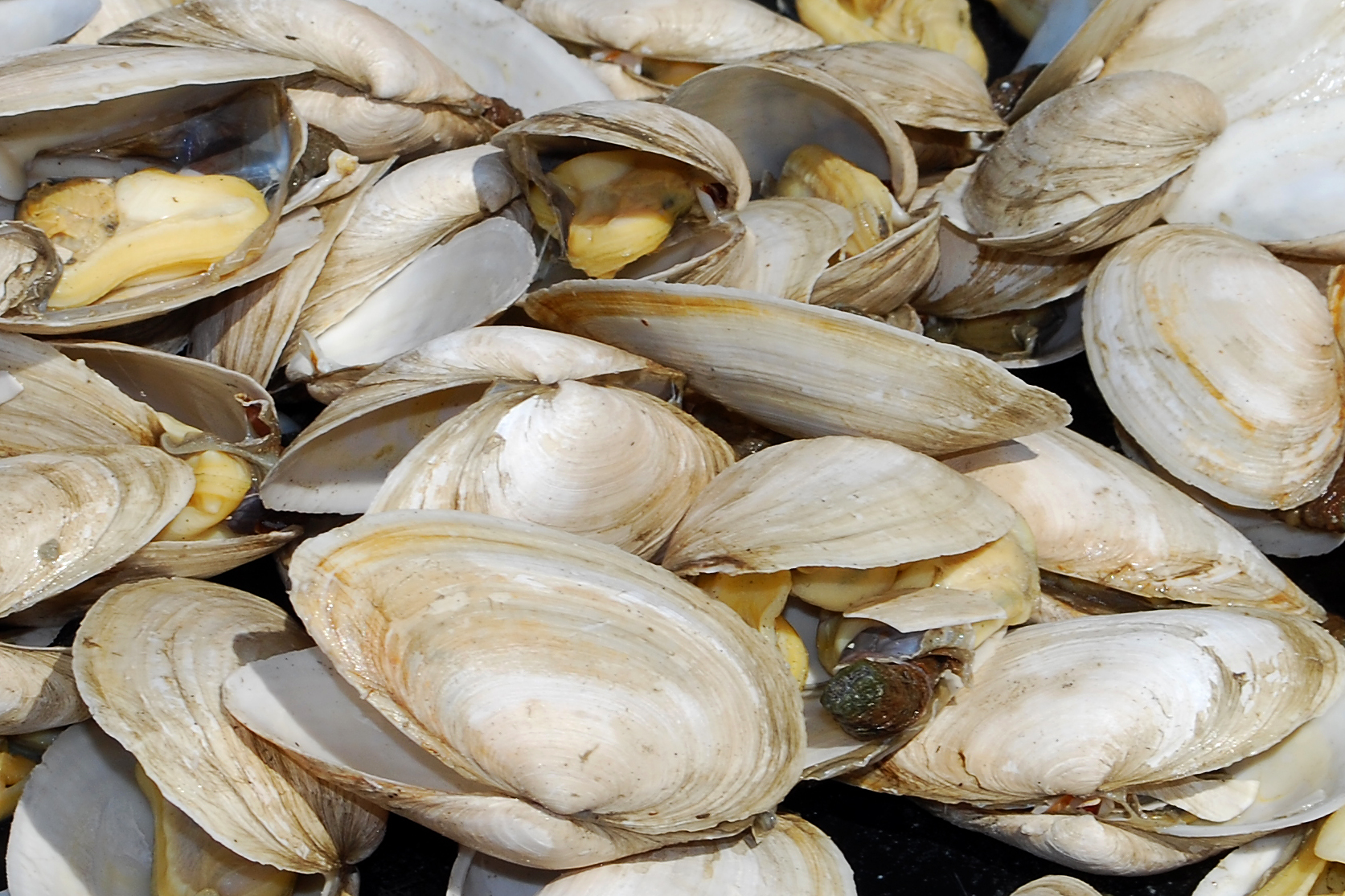
Dish of steamers in Gloucester, Massachusetts

There are many dishes based on steamed clams. In China, steamed clams can be served with eggs. In Thailand, steamed clams are served with lemongrass, ginger, or herbs. In France, they are often cooked with white wine, onion, garlic, shallots, and butter. Steamed clams are also eaten in Japan (oosari are large steamed clams).

The New England clam bake is a traditional preparation that includes clams layered with other ingredients such as corn, lobster, mussels, crabs, potatoes, and onions in a metal bucket. The layers are separated by seaweed and steamed over a fire outdoors and served family style as at a picnic.

== Consumption ==
Live clams are rinsed carefully to remove sand and grit and then cooked in a large kettle of water with salt added. Lemon juice, beer, garlic, shallots, parsley, and wine are sometimes added.

They are served with the cooking broth and melted butter. The clam is given a few quick dips in broth to remove any lingering sand before being dipped in melted butter and eaten. Steamers can be held by the siphon or "neck" when eaten. The covering of black skin is pulled away and removed as the clams are ingested.

== Steamers ==
Steamers are praised by many chefs, for instance Jacques Pépin: "Plentiful and inexpensive during the summer, especially in the Northeast, steamers are one of the great treats of the season." They are found in shallow waters from the Arctic Ocean to North Carolina, and have been found in Florida and Europe. They can be dug up by amateur clam diggers. Steamers have been transplanted to the West Coast and are available from San Francisco to Vancouver, British Columbia, Canada. They are sold in tanks and can also be shipped directly to consumers, but their shells sometimes get cracked.

== See also ==
- List of clam dishes
- List of seafood dishes
- List of steamed foods
