= List of clam dishes =

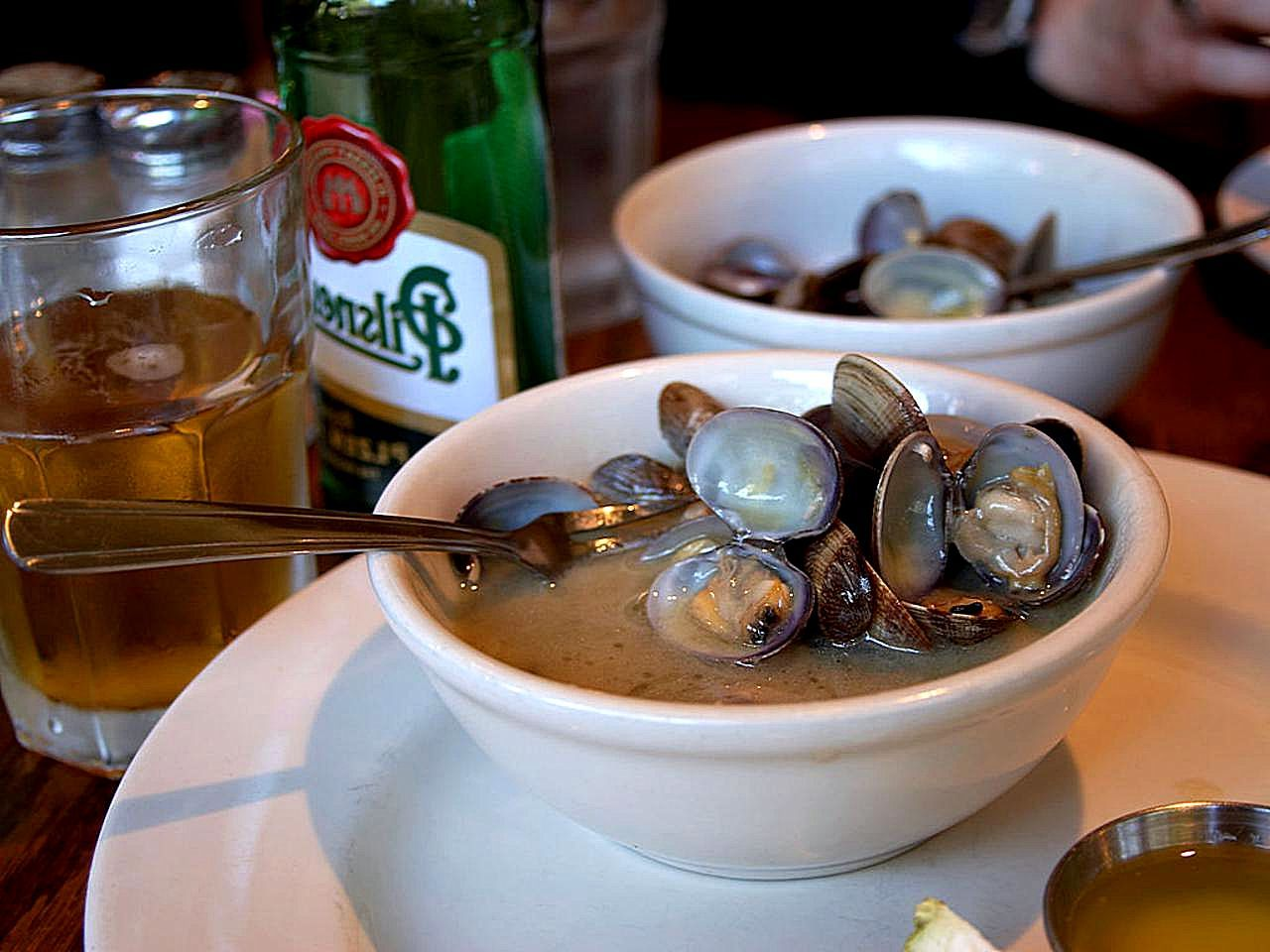
Steamed clams

This is a list of clam dishes and foods, which are prepared using clams as a primary ingredient. Edible clams can be eaten raw or cooked. Preparations methods include steamed, boiled, baked or fried.

== Clam dishes ==
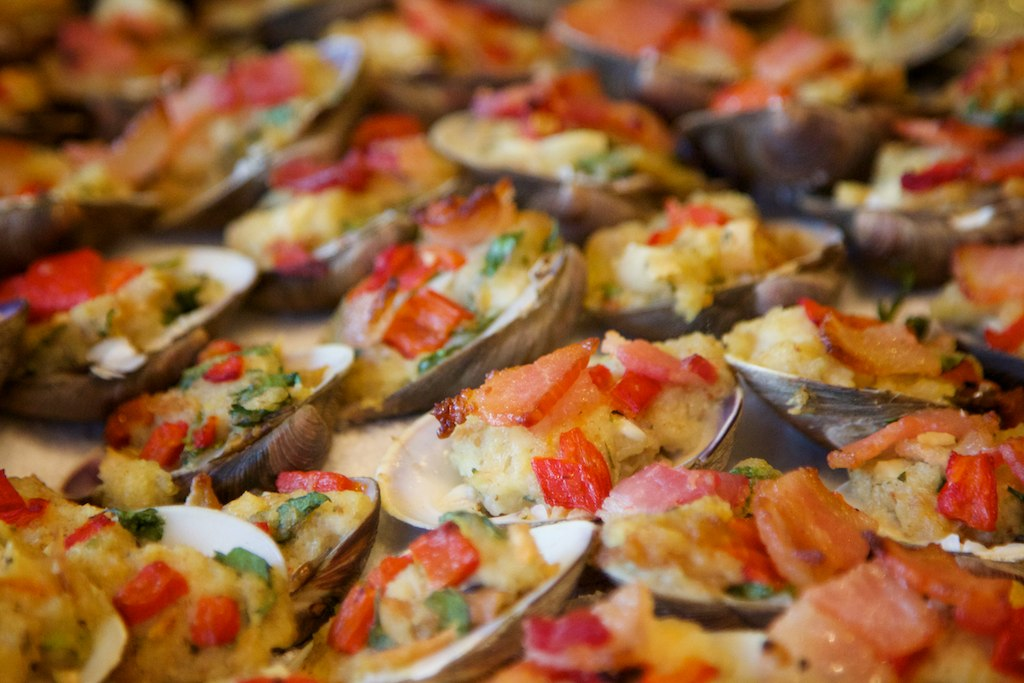
Clams casino

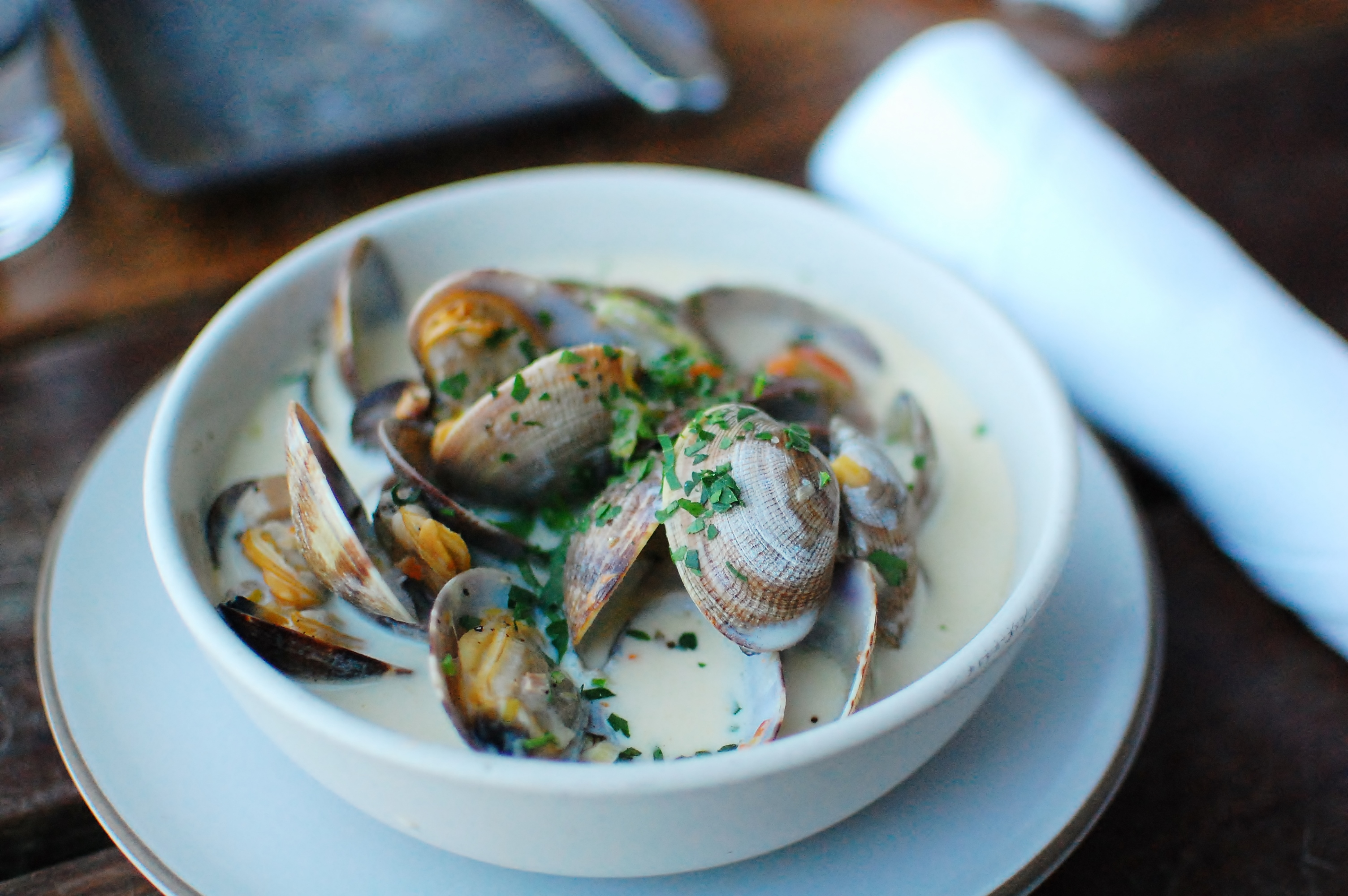
Clam chowder with whole clams

- Bulhão Pato clams
- Carne de porco à alentejana - a pork and clam dish
- Clams casino – a clam "on the halfshell" dish with breadcrumbs and bacon. It originated in Rhode Island in the United States and is often served as an appetizer in New England and is served in variations nationally.
- Clam cake – also known as clam fritters
- Clam dip – a dipping sauce and condiment
- Clam liquor – a liquid extracted during cooking and opening of clams. Undiluted it is called clam broth.
- Clam pie – Type of meat pie
  - White clam pie – a pizza variety
- Clam soup – a soup prepared using clams as a main ingredient
  - Clam chowder – a well-known chowder soup
  - Jaecheop-guk – a clear Korean soup made with small freshwater clams
- Fabes con almejas – a clam and bean stew that originated in the principality of Asturias in the 19th century as peasant fare. It is a lighter variation of Asturian fabada whose primary ingredients are sausage, beans and pork.
- Fried clams – New England seafood dish
- New England clam bake – also simply called a "clam bake"
- Clams oreganata – an Italian American seafood dish served most commonly as an appetizer
- Clam sauce – used as a topping for pasta
- Steamed clams – Seafood dish consisting of clams
- Stuffed clam – American seafood dish
Clam dishes

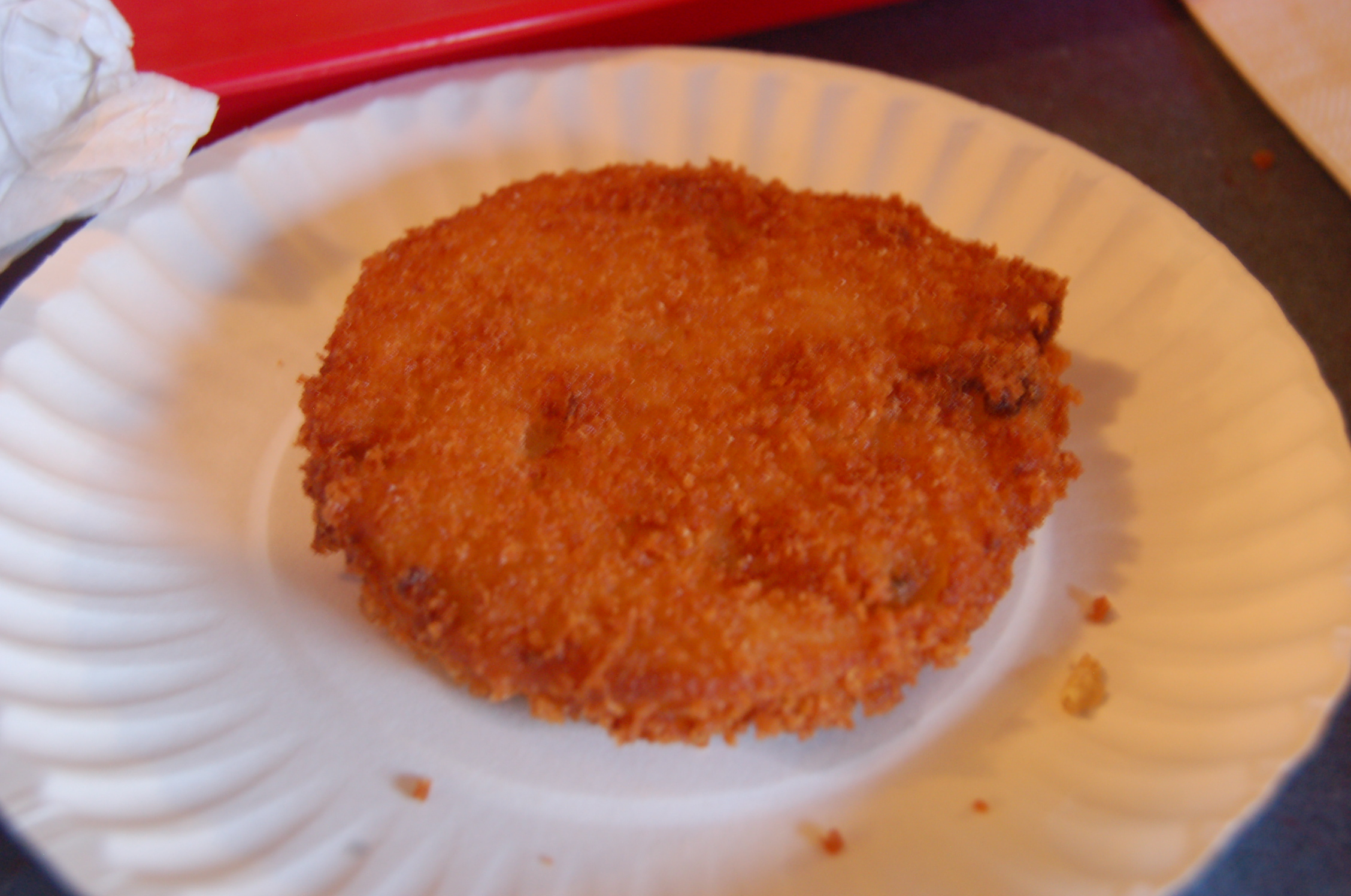
A clam cake

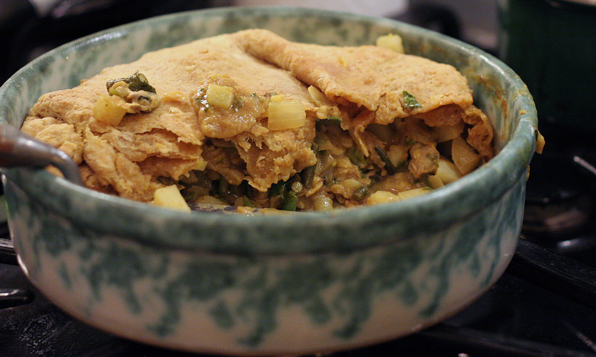
A clam pie prepared with curry spices

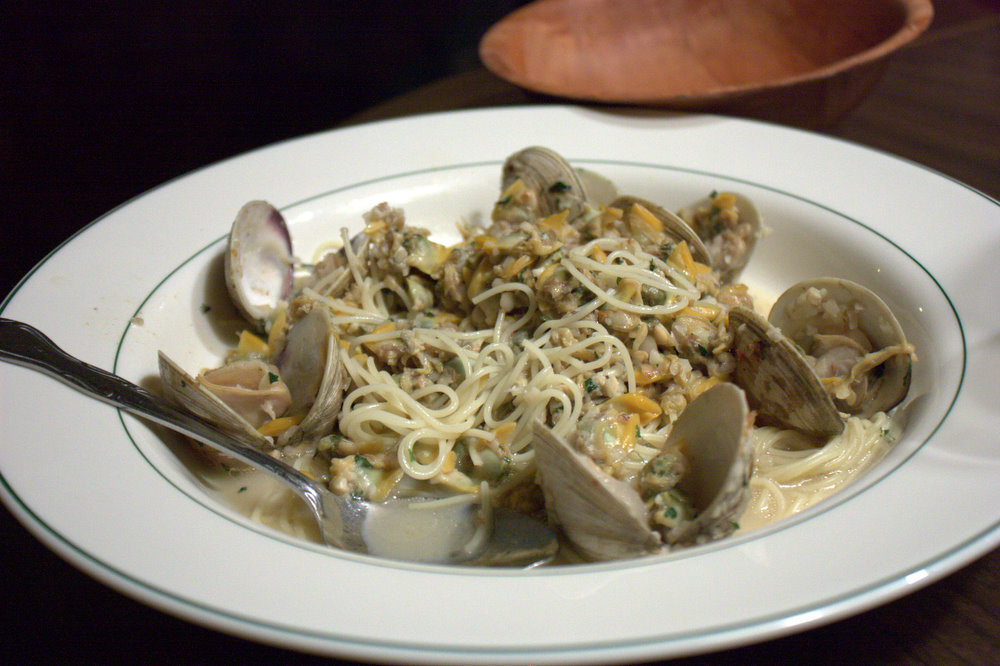
Clams and noodles in a clam sauce

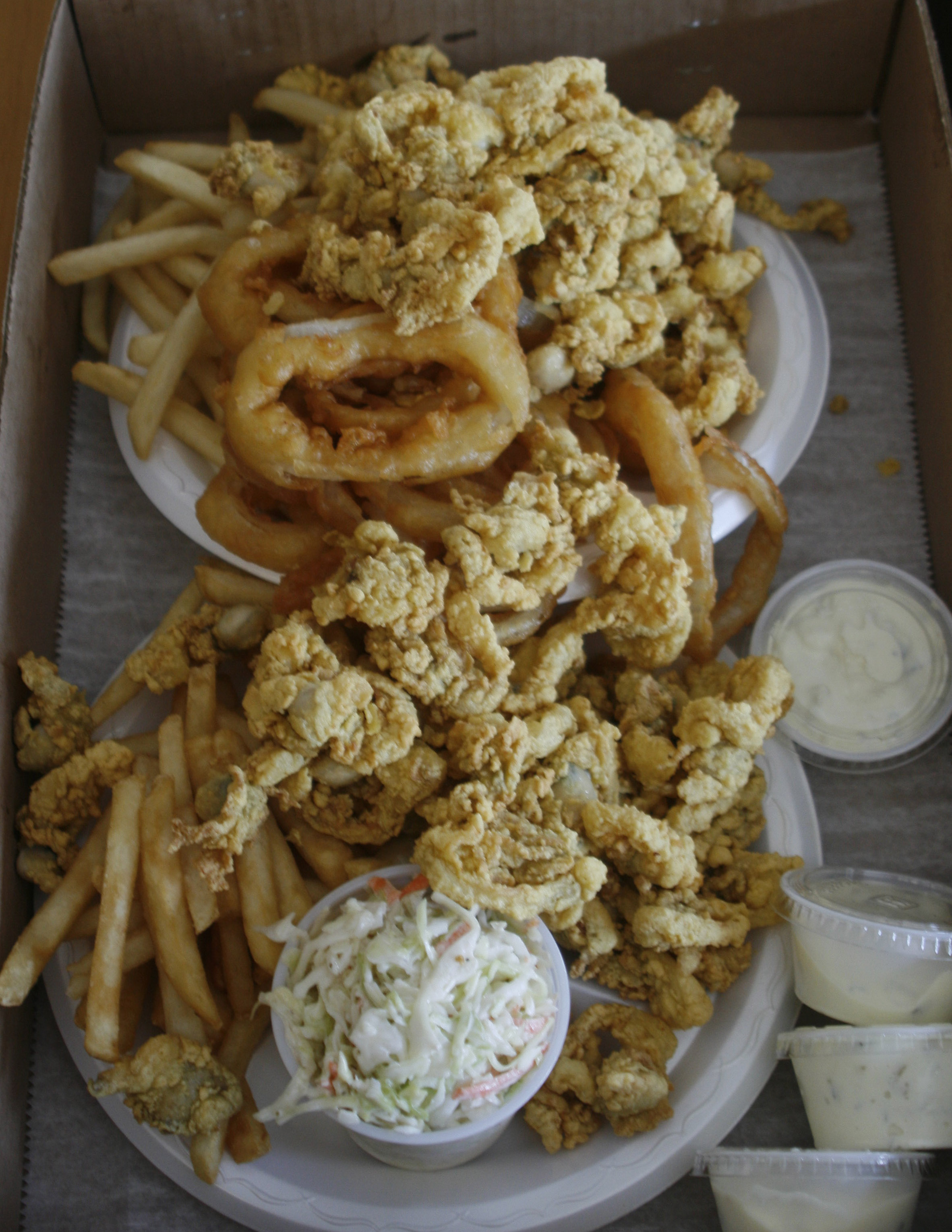
Fried clams with other foods

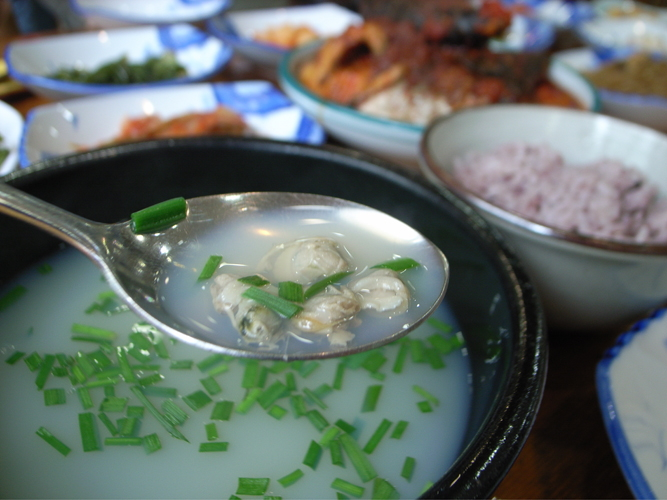
Jaecheop-guk

=== Beverages ===
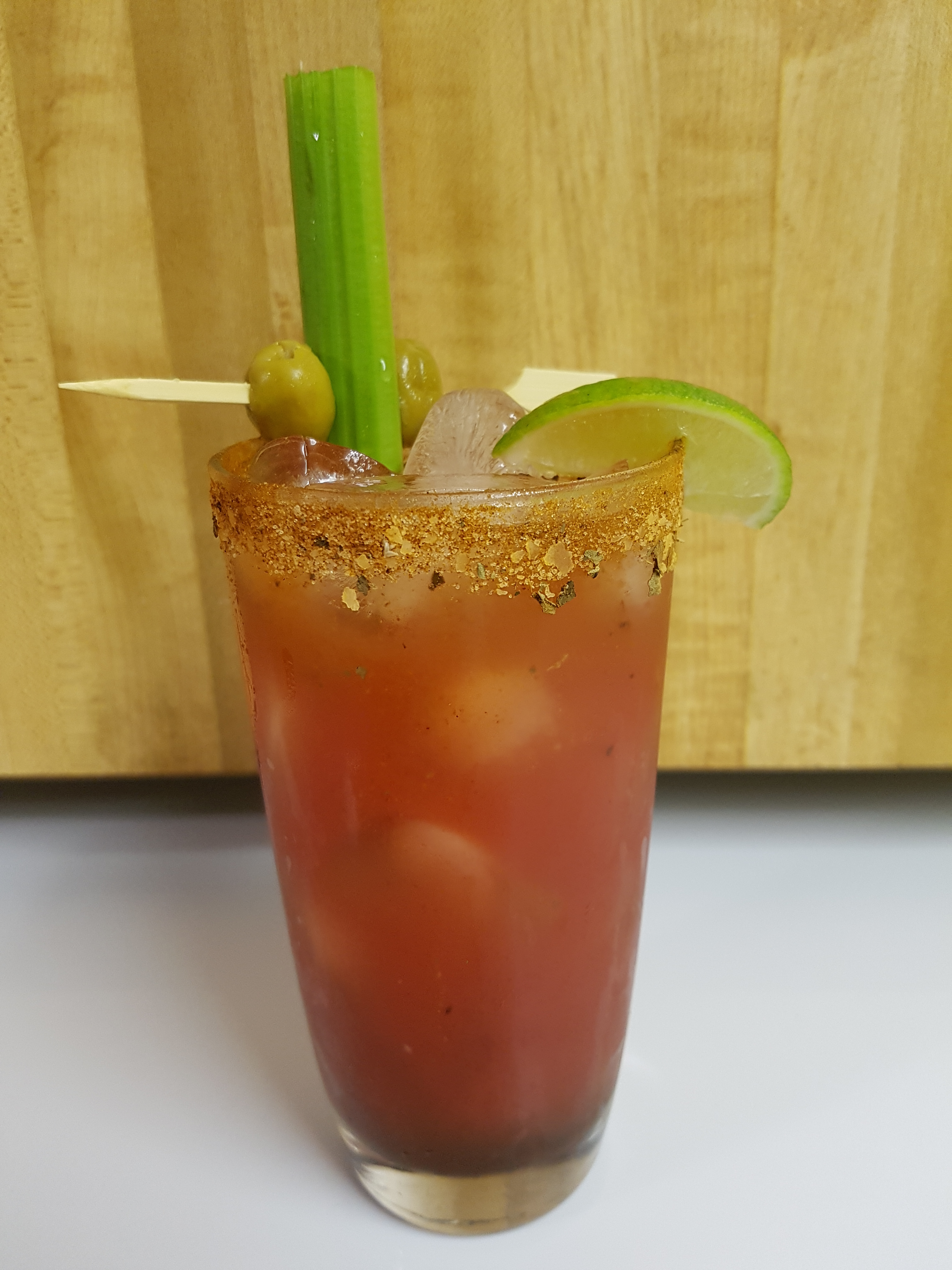
A Bloody Caesar cocktail

- Caesar – a cocktail created and primarily consumed in Canada. It typically contains vodka, a caesar mix (a blend of tomato juice and clam broth), hot sauce, and Worcestershire sauce, and is served with ice in a large, celery salt-rimmed glass, typically garnished with a stalk of celery and wedge of lime.
- Clamato – a commercial drink made of reconstituted tomato juice concentrate, flavored with spices and clam broth

== See also ==
- List of seafood dishes
