= Clam sauce =

Pasta sauce

Clam sauce, known in Italian as sugo alle vongole, is a topping for pasta, usually linguine. The two most popular varieties are white, usually featuring minced clams, olive oil, garlic, lemon juice or white wine, and parsley, and red, usually a thin tomato sauce with minced clams. Other variants include the incorporation of whole clams, hot pepper flakes, and other ingredients. Clam juice may be used.

== See also ==
- List of sauces
- List of clam dishes
