= Clam liquor =

Liquid released during the cooking of clams

Clam liquor (also known as clam extract or clam juice) is the liquid released during the cooking or steaming of clams; when not diluted it forms a natural clam broth. It may be canned in any of these forms or used to fill canned clam meat. It is a common ingredient in many seafood dishes and is also used as a natural seasoning. Clam liquor enhances the flavor of soups, stews, sauces, and various other preparations, and it is used widely in professional cooking. It is also described as a standard flavoring base for chowders, sauces, and other seafood preparations in industry references.

== See also ==
- List of clam dishes
