= Aunt Carrie's =

- Interactive map of Aunt Carrie's

Restaurant information
- Established: 1920
- Food type: Seafood
- Location: 1240 Ocean Road, Narragansett, Rhode Island, 02282, United States
- Coordinates: 41.372820°N 71.484974°W
- Website: auntcarriesri.com

Aunt Carrie's is a seafood restaurant in the Point Judith neighborhood of Narragansett, Rhode Island, opened in 1920 by Carrie and Ulysses Cooper. In 1994, Carrie's grandson Bill died; since then, his wife and now their two daughters run the restaurant.

Family legend claims that the clam cake was invented here when Carrie Cooper added fresh clams to the corn fritters.

Diners, Drive-ins and Dives featured the shack on October 29, 2012. Taste of America on the Travel Channel also featured Aunt Carrie's.

In 2013, Fodor's wrote about Aunt Carrie's in its guidebook, saying "its peerless location and unpretentious atmosphere are the main draws, along with comfortable favorites like clam cakes, steamers, and fish-and-chips."

== Awards and honors ==
- Rhode Island Monthly Magazine – “The Best of Rhode Island” Award since 1988,
- Yankee Magazine Travelers’ Guide - 1997 Editor's Pick, 2012 named best lobster shack,
- James Beard Foundation “America’s Classics” Award - 2007,

== See also ==
- List of seafood restaurants
