= Oysters Kirkpatrick =

Oyster dish

Oysters Kirkpatrick, also called oysters Kilpatrick, or Kirkpatrick and oysters, or oysters Philpatrick, is a dish of oysters topped with cooked bacon, seasoned with Worcestershire sauce, ketchup, or other flavorings, then broiled.

The chef Ernest Arbogast of the Palm Court (later the Garden Court) of San Francisco's Palace Hotel supposedly named the dish after Colonel John C. Kirkpatrick, who managed the hotel from 1894 to 1914.

== See also ==
- Clams casino
- List of seafood dishes
- Oysters Rockefeller
- Tetrazzini
