= Clams casino =

Clam dish

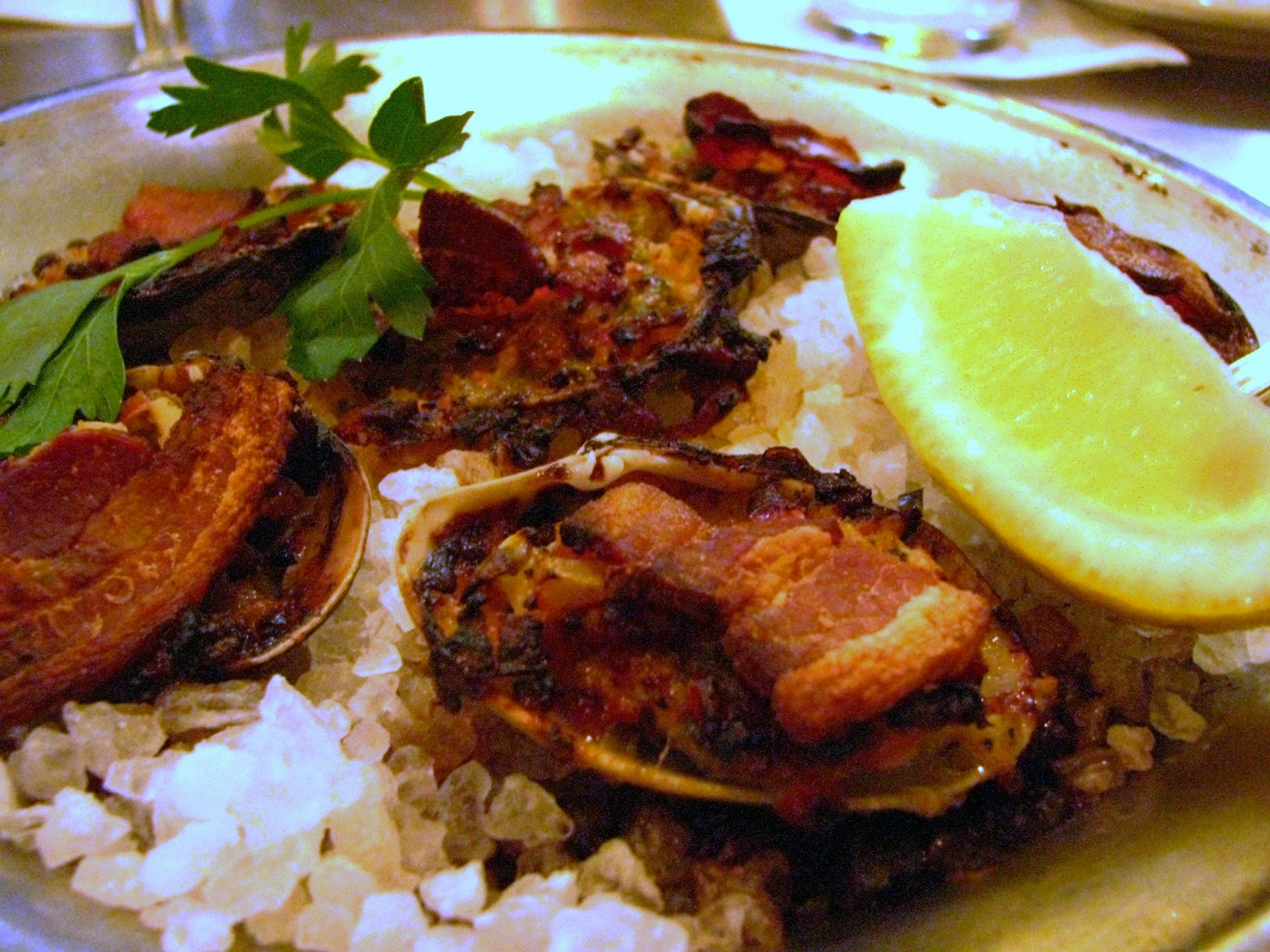
- Clams casino over rock salt with lemon and parsley garnish
- Place of origin: United States
- Region or state: Rhode Island
- Main ingredients: clam, breadcrumbs and bacon

Clams casino is a clam "on the halfshell" dish with breadcrumbs and bacon. Green peppers are also a common ingredient.

It originated in Rhode Island in the United States. It is often served as an appetizer in New England and is served in variations nationally.

== Ingredients ==
The dish uses littlenecks or cherrystone clams. Other basic ingredients include butter, peppers, bacon and garlic. Worcestershire sauce, salt and pepper, white wine, lemon juice, and shallots or onion are also used. Tabasco sauce is sometimes added, and parsley is sometimes used as a garnish.

== Preparation ==
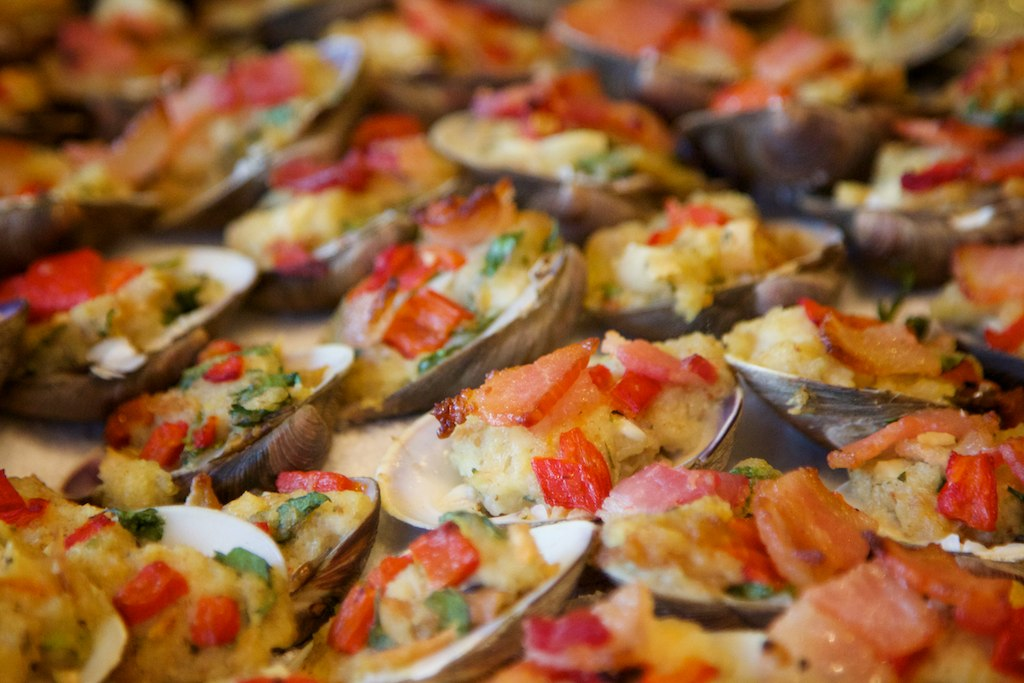
Clams casino

The clams, bacon, and other ingredients are cooked in various ways depending on the recipe, and then added with breading to half the clam shell and baked or broiled (grilled from above) to a golden brown.

There are many variations on the dish, but the constant factor is the bacon: "Bacon remains the major key to its success", with some chefs recommending smoked bacon for its salty flavor and others advocating an unsmoked variety.

== History ==
According to legend, the recipe for clams casino was originally developed in 1917 in the Little Casino in Narragansett, Rhode Island, by a maître d'hôtel for a woman of means wanting something special for her guests. Good Housekeeping Great American Classics attributes the dish to Mrs. Paran Stevens and maître d'hôtel Julius Keller. She named the dish after the hotel, and word and popularity of the dish has since spread across the United States, including New Orleans, where oysters are substituted for clams. Clams casino remains a very popular dish in Rhode Island, "appearing on almost every menu".

The Central Park Casino was offering "soft clams a la Casino" as early as 1900.

According to Merrill Shindler, "in the first decades of this century [the 20th], if a restaurant wanted to be noted, it came up with a dish that involved the baking of shellfish". While there was a profusion of this type of menu offering (often with the meat taken out of the shell, prepared with sauce, and returned to the shell), clams casino and oysters Rockefeller "are among the few surviving dishes from the shellfish fad".

The dish is popular with Italian-Americans, having "a permanent spot on just about every trattoria menu" in Little Italy, Manhattan, and is considered an American classic. Clams casino is often served at Italian festivals and during the holidays in the United States.

== See also ==
- Clams oreganata
- List of bacon dishes
- List of clam dishes
- List of regional dishes of the United States
- List of seafood dishes
- Oysters Kirkpatrick
