= Datil pepper =

Variety of chili pepper

- Species: Capsicum chinense
- Heat: Very hot
- Scoville scale: 100,000–300,000 SHU

The datil is a very hot pepper, a variety of the species Capsicum chinense (syn. Capsicum sinense).

Datil peppers are cultivated throughout the United States and elsewhere, but the majority are produced in St. Augustine, Florida. Many myths attempt to explain the origin of the datil pepper: some suggest the peppers were brought to St. Augustine by indentured workers from Menorca in the late 18th century, others posit that they were brought from Cuba around 1880 by a jelly maker named S. B. Valls.

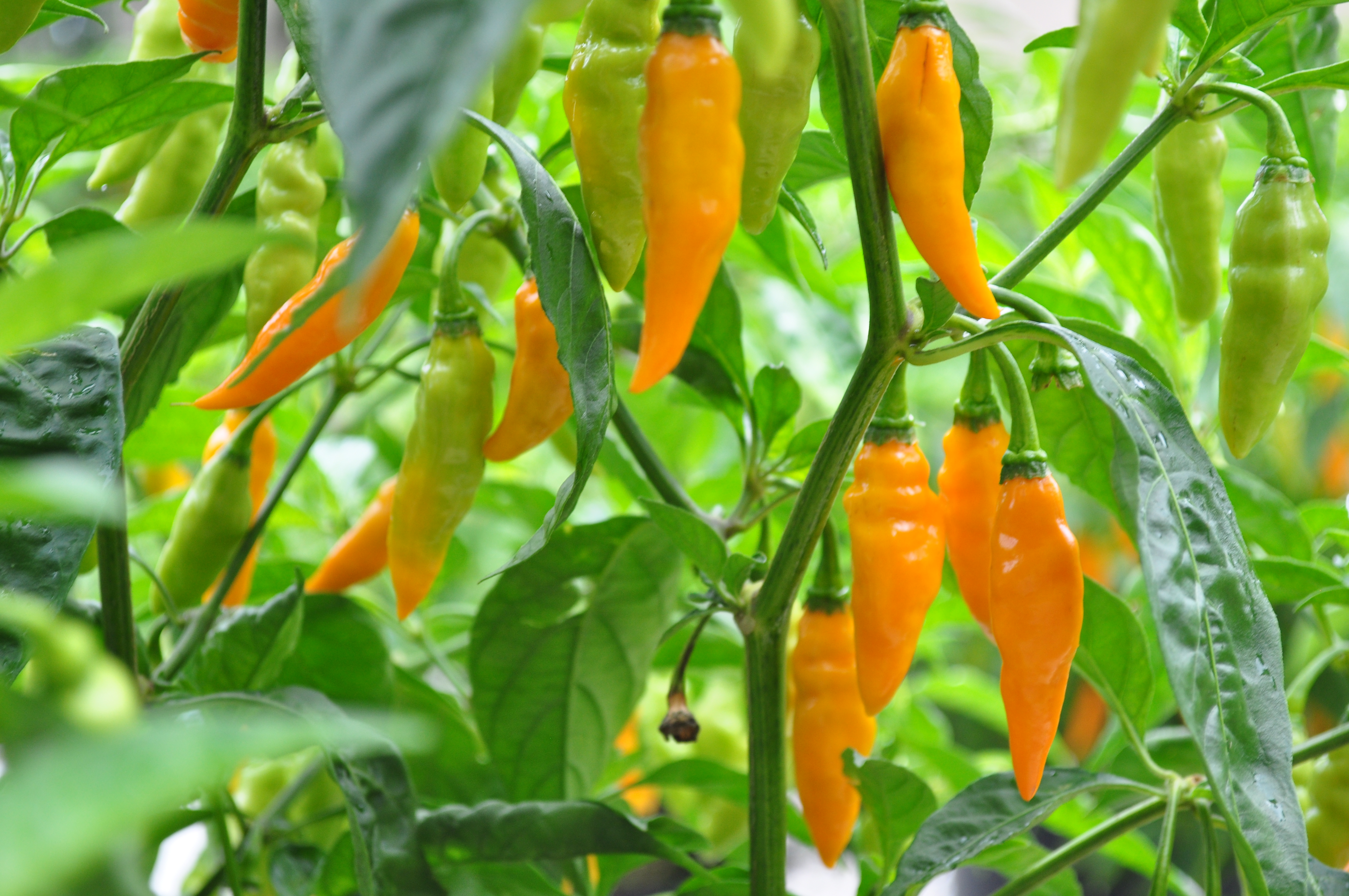
Heirloom hot datil pepper

The datil pepper is a green to yellowish-golden aromatic hot pepper belonging to the species of Capsicum chinense and is mainly produced and grown in St. Augustine, Florida. A mature datil pepper is 3-4 cm long with a blunt tip, a golden-orange color and weighs 3 grams. Its taste is a mix of both hot and sweet. The name datil was derived from the Spanish and Catalan language meaning date palm, because the shape of a datil pepper resembles it.

== Origin ==
The origin of the datil pepper began after the Treaty of Paris in 1763. Over 100,000 acres of land was obtained by Andrew Turnbull, a Scotsman, and led numerous families of workers from Mediterranean countries to Florida via Minorca, which is a Spanish island acquired by the British. This Floridian land was later established by Turnbull as New Smyrna. Turnbull later continued to search for more newcomers whilst many Greek conscripts were left in Mahon, Minorca. The Minorcans felt an absence of civil and religious rights in Minorca, therefore decided to explore better living options in America. For a year, Turnbull recruited 1400 colonists and voyaged across to Florida. 450 Mediterranean people died from the dangerous circumstances of the voyage. The environment in New Smyrna was also not optimal for living and working, which resulted in survivors fleeing north to St. Augustine. After the American Revolution, the remainders living in St. Augustine gained possession of a few acres of land and slaves. Historic research suggest that the datil pepper was journeyed through St. Augustine from Minorca. Others believe that the peppers were received through Turnbull's slaves, the Mandingos. There were no Capsicum chinense being cultivated at this time in the Mediterranean region, further suggesting that the pepper originated elsewhere and not in Minorca.

Other origin stories argue that slaves from New Smyrna were in West Indies, where an abundance of common peppers were accessible. It is said that Mandingos were transported from West Indian slave markets via British ships, such as from Havana to Florida. The strong priorities of seasoning for Africans influenced the British slaves to incorporate chilies into their staple foods. Chili peppers were loaded on to ship vessels along with the slaves. Trading via ships is the next nearest source of the datil pepper arriving in Florida because of trading from Cuba and West Indies along the North American coast. From there, the datil pepper seeds could be grown to provide a plentiful supply. Research deduced that there is a possibility that the St. Augustine datil pepper belongs to the same plant and species such as the Habanero pepper. However, it is improbable that the pepper was given to the Minorcans from the Africans in New Smyrna because it had little connections with Cuba.

St. Johns County Florida Incorporated and Unincorporated areas St. Augustine Highlighted

In September 2013, Daniel Cantliffe, a professor of Horticultural Sciences, presented to the St Johns County Commission and stated, “The one thing I want to make completely clear to everyone: St Johns County is the only place on the planet that this plant, the Datil, has come from … It originated and came from St. Augustine. We have looked around the planet; we can’t find it anywhere else.” St Johns County still resides roughly 25,000 to 26,000 Minorcan descendants.

== Cultivation ==
The datil pepper is the “first Capsicum chinense to be grown for profit in the United States” since its arrival in St. Augustine. It is normally grown in back-yard gardens by families in northeastern Florida. The seeds are scarce to obtain commercially, so are typically available through local farmers or on the Internet. Local families typically grow the peppers in small batches and are then used for their local restaurants and businesses. Datil peppers do not last when fully ripe, so the optimal stage to buy them is when they are green.

Datil peppers are grown in similar ways to hot and mild peppers. Datil pepper seeds will germinate on soil temperatures of 75 – 80 degrees Fahrenheit. Germination takes between 10 and 20 days. Seeds can be planted indoors at the latter half of winter and transferred once temperatures become warmer. Seeds can also be planted halfway through summer and transferred around the autumn season. Seeds of the datil pepper can be extracted from a mature pepper and stored. Seeds need to be dried for several days and then stored in a dry and cool location. A frequent pest of the datil peppers are pepper weevils.

The American Society for Horticultural Science conducted research to test the effect of harvest maturity on pepper quality. The experiment consisted of harvesting datil peppers at their yellow and orange stages. The fruit harvested at yellow stage had substantially better results compared to when harvested at the orange stage. Fruit harvested at yellow stage harvest had 91 percent marketability compared to 75 percent of orange peppers. A datil pepper will start to lose its quality and shrivel after 14 days of storage. A yellow-harvested pepper is faintly less sweet than the orange-harvested pepper. The optimal harvest stage of datil peppers is at their yellow-stage, allowing up to 21 days of storage at 2 ˚C (35.6 ˚F) before a decline in quality.

Datil varieties frequently used in culinary practices are the Wanda, Sensation and Terra Time.

== Uses ==
Datil peppers are mainly used in cooking, hot sauces and condiments. Condiments created by Minorcan cooks consisted of vinegars, jellies, and mustards. A ketchup-based datil sauce, most commonly known as “Bottled Hell”, is used locally for seafood dishes. Another popular hot sauce containing ketchup, brown sugar, tomato paste, honey and the datil pepper sauce is called the “Dat’l-Do-It”. The most well-known dish that includes the datil peppers is the Minorcan seafood chowder.

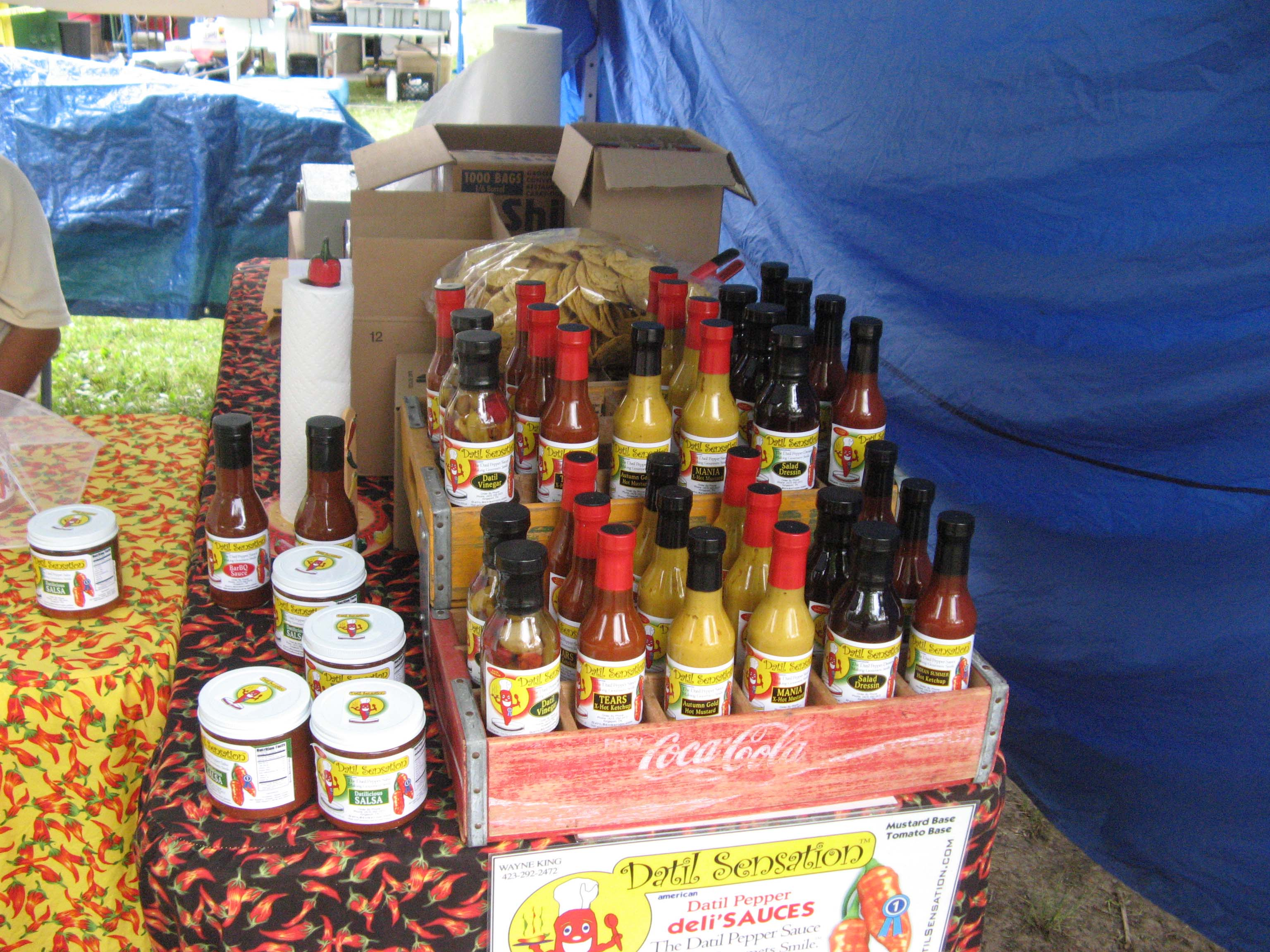
Datil pepper sauces

== Culture ==
The pepper is widely known across St. Augustine.The exclusivity to St. Augustine for centuries has led it to becoming a staple in Florida cuisine and culture. The datil pepper and its commercially made sauces have become prominent in the St. Augustine tourism industry as it occupies grocery and souvenir stores. In September 2013, due to the overwhelming popularity of the Datil pepper, the first Saturday in October is now known as “Datil Pepper Day” as announced by the St. Johns County Board of County Commissioners. The datil pepper has become “the official plant of St. Johns County”

The St. John's County celebrates their official plant, the datil pepper, at the start of autumn by hosting The Datil Pepper Fall Festival. This festival is hosted annually every year in October in St. Augustine. The 12th annual festival was hosted on October 5, 2019.

== Characteristics ==
The datil pepper has a similar Scoville heat rating to the Habanero pepper, ranging between 100,000 and 300,000. The time till maturity for the pepper is approximately 5 months and the plant can grow 18 inches (1 ft 6 in). Its color ranges between green, yellow and orange. The datil pepper is approximately 12 times hotter than a jalapeño on the Scoville heat scale. It has similar features to a habanero, a pepper also from the Chinense species. It is longer and skinnier and sweeter than the habanero.

== See also ==
- Capsicum
- Jalapeño
- Habanero
