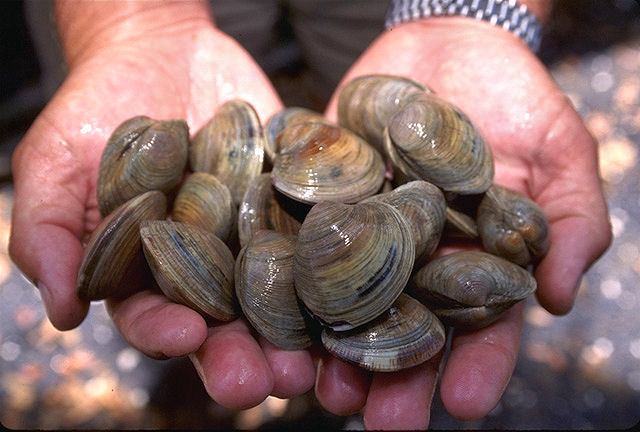

Conservation status
- Secure (NatureServe)

Scientific classification
- Kingdom: Animalia
- Phylum: Mollusca
- Class: Bivalvia
- Order: Venerida
- Superfamily: Veneroidea
- Family: Veneridae
- Genus: Mercenaria
- Species: M. mercenaria

Binomial name
- Mercenaria mercenaria (Linnaeus, 1758)

= Hard clam =

Mollusc species native to the Americas

The hard clam (Mercenaria mercenaria), also known as the round clam, hard-shell (or hard-shelled) clam, or the quahog, is an edible marine bivalve mollusk that is native to the eastern shores of North America and Central America from Prince Edward Island to the Yucatán Peninsula. It is one of many unrelated edible bivalves that in the United States are frequently referred to simply as clams. Older literature sources may use the systematic name Venus mercenaria; this species is in the family Veneridae, the venus clams.

The "ocean quahog" is a different species, Arctica islandica, which, although superficially similar in shape, is in a different family of bivalves: it is rounder than the hard clam, usually has a black periostracum, and there is no pallial sinus in the interior of the shell.

== Alternative names ==
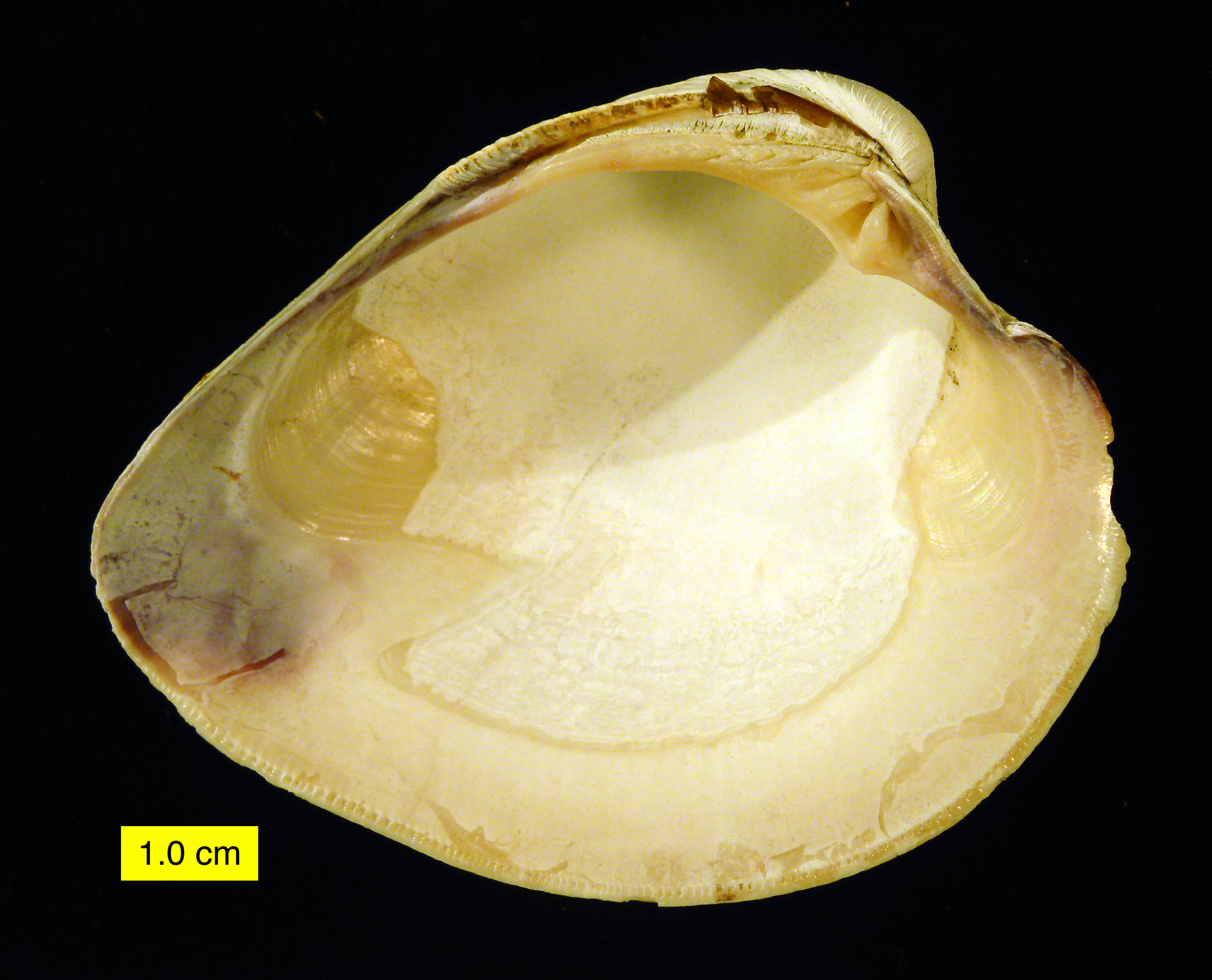
Left valve interior of Mercenaria mercenaria.

The hard clam has many alternative common names, including the Northern quahog, round clam, and chowder clam.

Fish markets use specialist names for different sizes of this species of clam. The smallest legally harvestable clams are called countnecks or peanuts, the next size up are littlenecks, then come topnecks. Above these are the cherrystones, and the largest are called quahogs or chowder clams.

The distinctive name quahog ( /ˈkwɔːhɒɡ/ KWAW-hog /ˈkoʊhɒɡ/ KOH-hog, or /kwəˈhɒɡ/ kwə-HOG, also spelt quahaug, quohog or cohog). comes from the Narragansett word poquauhock (similar terms occur in Wampanoag and in some other Algonquian languages); it is attested (as 'quauhogs') in English-language usage from 1781. Native polities on the eastern Atlantic seaboard manufactured valuable beads called wampum from the shells, especially from those colored purple; the species name mercenaria is related to the Latin word for "commerce". As of 2026 people living in coastal New England still use Algonquian words for the clam.

In many areas where aquaculture is important, clam-farmers have bred specialized versions of these clams with distinctions for use in the marketplace. These are quite similar to common "wild type" Mercenaria clams, except that their shells bear distinctive markings. These are known as the notata strain of quahogs, which occur naturally in low numbers wherever quahogs are found.

== Distribution ==
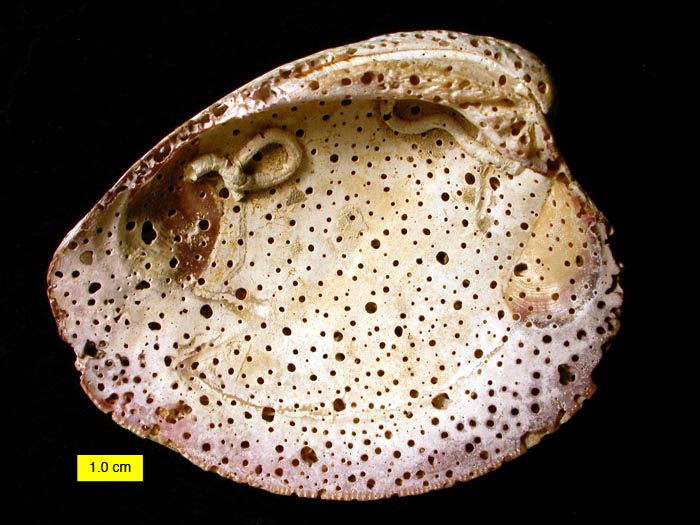
An old quahog shell that has been bored (producing Entobia) and encrusted after the death of the clam

Hard clams are quite common throughout New England, north into Canada, and all down the Eastern seaboard of the United States to Florida; but they are particularly abundant between Cape Cod and New Jersey, where seeding and harvesting them is an important commercial form of aquaculture. For example, the species is an important member of the suspension-feeding, benthic fauna of the lower Chesapeake Bay.

Rhode Island is situated right in the middle of "quahog country" and has supplied a quarter of the U.S.'s total annual commercial quahog catch. The quahog is the official shellfish of the U.S. state of Rhode Island and is the namesake of the fictional Rhode Island town featured in the animated sitcom Family Guy. The species has also been introduced and is farmed on the Pacific coast of North America and in Great Britain and continental Europe. It reproduces sexually by females and males shedding gametes into the water.

== Parasite ==
Quahog parasite unknown (QPX) is a parasite that affects the hard shell clam Mercenaria mercenaria. While little is known about the disease, research is currently under way in several laboratories. This research is fueled by the need to inform aquaculturists, who suffer financially because of the mortality rates in clams that QPX inflicts and the ensuing years in which runs must be left fallow to clear the disease. It was discovered along the coast of Cape Cod, Massachusetts, in 1995.

Quahog parasite X (or quahog parasite unknown [QPX]) disease of the hard clam Mercenaria mercenaria is caused by a poorly known protistan parasite. Its DNA sequence analysis places the QPX parasite among the thraustochytrid stramenopiles. The QPX parasite is unicellular and possesses at least one flagellum, like most other stramenopile organisms. Thraustochytrids are common protists in marine sediments and the water column, but only a few thraustochytrids are known as parasites of marine animals. Although QPX disease was first recorded on the Atlantic coast of Canada in the early 1960s, it did not become a major economic problem until its appearance in cultured clams at Prince Edward Island, Massachusetts in 1992, and Virginia in 1997. Infected clams are characterized by the presence of blisters or pustules in the mantle and later by gaping and death.

== Human use ==
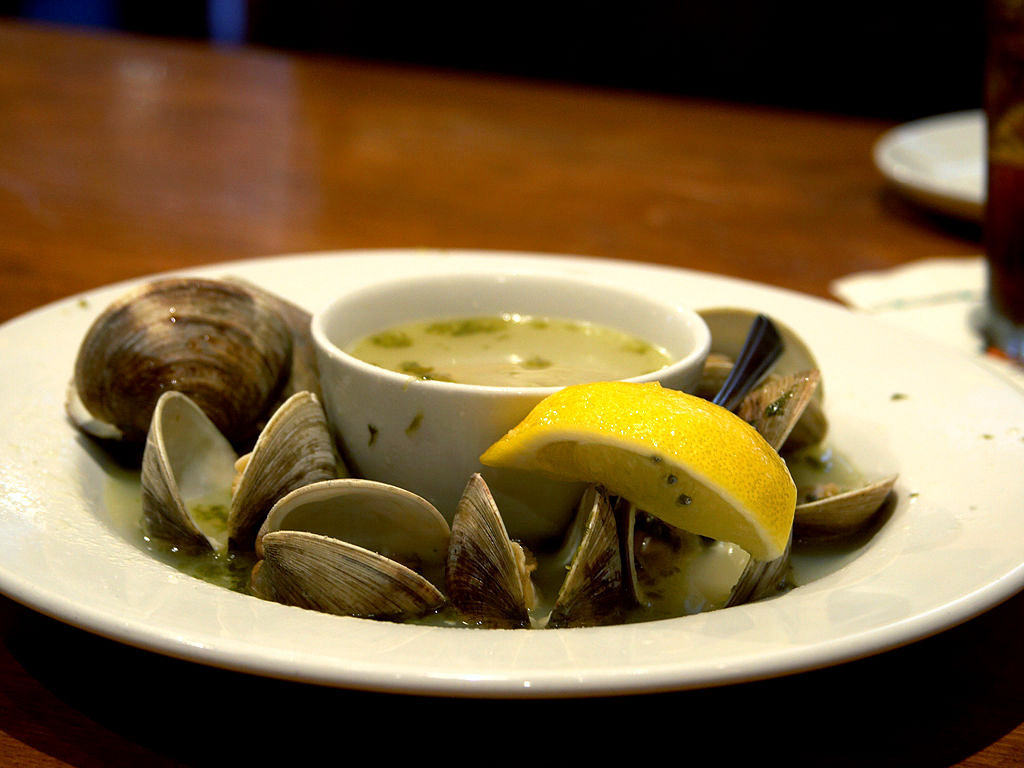
Steamed clams

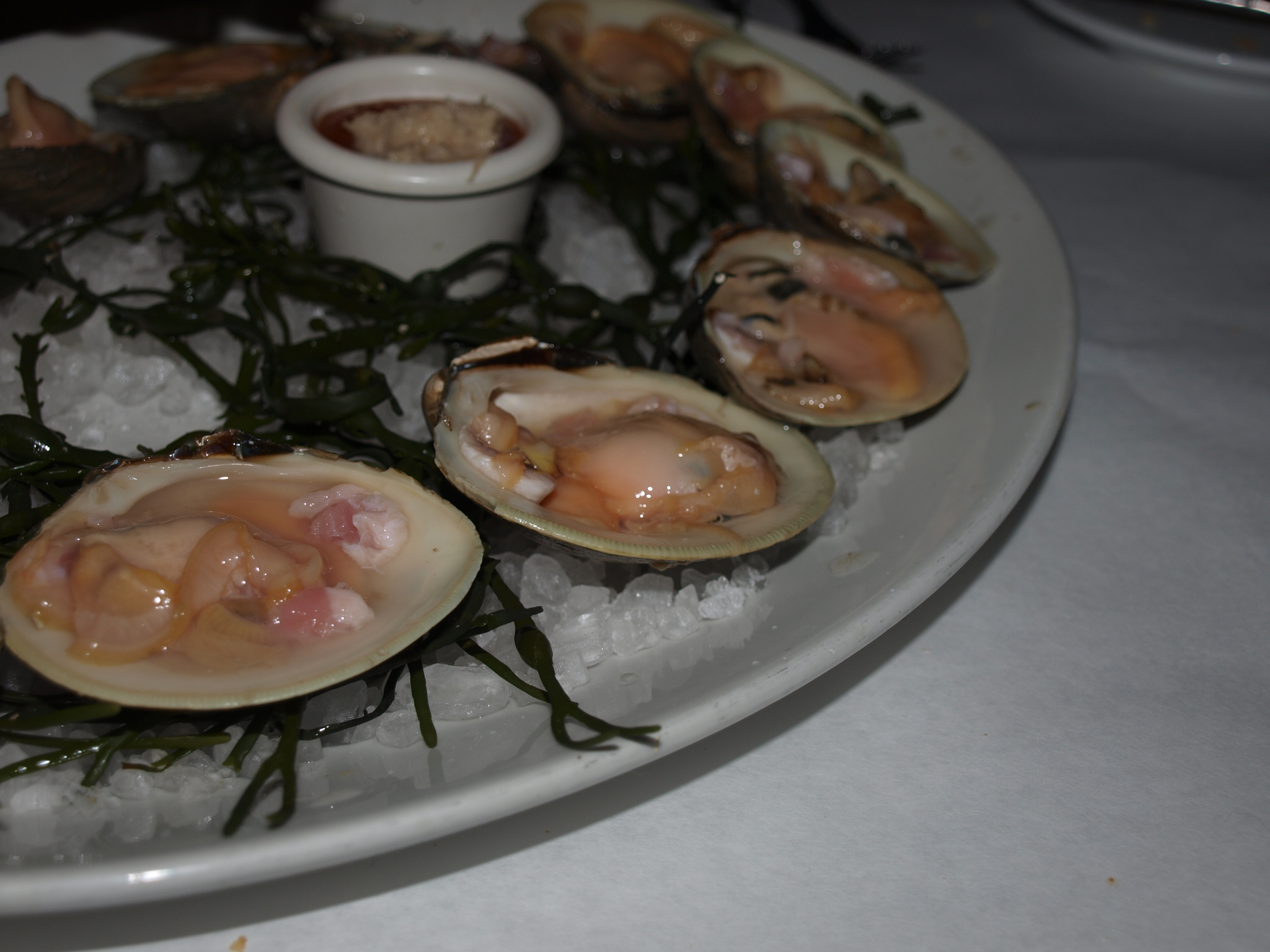
Raw top neck clams in New Jersey.

In coastal areas of the New England states, Long Island, and New Jersey, restaurants known as raw bars or clam bars specialize in serving littlenecks and topnecks raw on an opened half-shell, usually with a cocktail sauce with horseradish, and often with lemon. Sometimes littlenecks are steamed and dipped in butter, though not as commonly as their soft-shelled clam cousin the "steamer". Littlenecks are often found in-the-shell in sauces, soups, stews, and clams casino, or substituted for European varieties such as the cockle in southern European seafood dishes. The largest clams are quahogs or chowders and cherrystones; they have the toughest meat and are used in such dishes as clam chowder, clam cakes, and stuffed clams, or are minced and mixed into dishes that use the smaller, more tender clams.

Historically, Native Americans used the quahog as a component in wampum, the shell beads exchanged in the North American fur trade. The Narragansetts used the hard clam for food and ornaments.

A population of hard clams exists in Southampton Water in Hampshire, England. Originally bred in the warm water outflows at Southampton Power Station for use as eel bait, the population became self-sustaining and can now be found in Southampton Water and has also spread to Portsmouth Harbour and Langstone Harbour.

== Clams and red tide ==
The term "red tide" refers to an accumulation of a toxin, such as saxitoxin, produced by marine algae. Filter-feeding shellfish are affected, such as clams, oysters, and mussels. As they filter microorganisms, clams ingest K. brevis algae. This algae accumulates in the clams' tissues and is toxic to humans when they are consumed. The toxin affects the human central nervous system. Eating contaminated shellfish, raw or cooked, can be fatal. Some other kinds of algal blooms make the seawater appear red, but red tide blooms do not always discolor the water, nor are they related to tides.
