= Stuffed clam =

American seafood dish

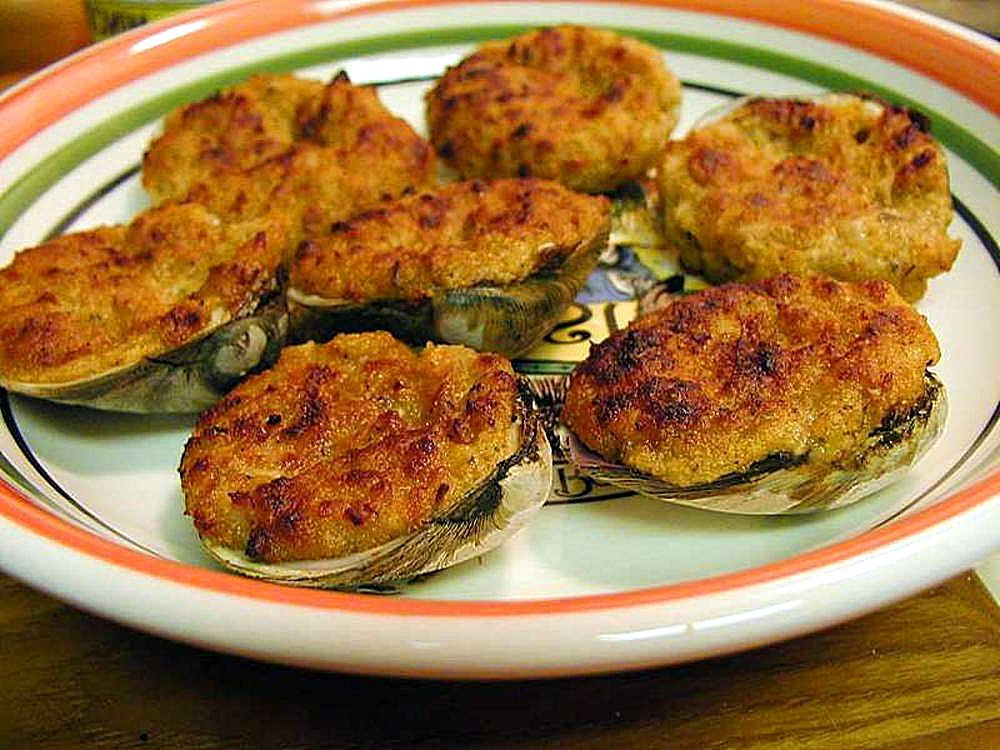
Stuffed clams

Stuffed clams (or stuffies) are popular in New England, especially in Rhode Island and the adjacent South Coast of Massachusetts. It consists of a breadcrumb and minced clam mixture that is baked on the half shell of a quahog hard shell clam. Ingredients beyond bread crumbs vary, but often include stock (reserved from the liquid in which the clams were streamed), as well as onion, celery, and pork fat, often either bacon or Portuguese sausages, such as chouriço or linguiça. Herbs are often included. Some recipes include white wine, garlic, and red pepper. The dish is sometimes served with lemon wedges and a vinegar-based hot sauce.

The composition of the stuffies reflects both Yankee sensibilities on thriftiness, as well as influences from Portuguese and Cape Verdean Americans who settled in coastal New England. The dish has been called a tavern food.

== See also ==
- Stuffed mussels
- List of clam dishes
- List of seafood dishes
- List of stuffed dishes
