= Clam chowder =

Soup containing clams and broth or milk

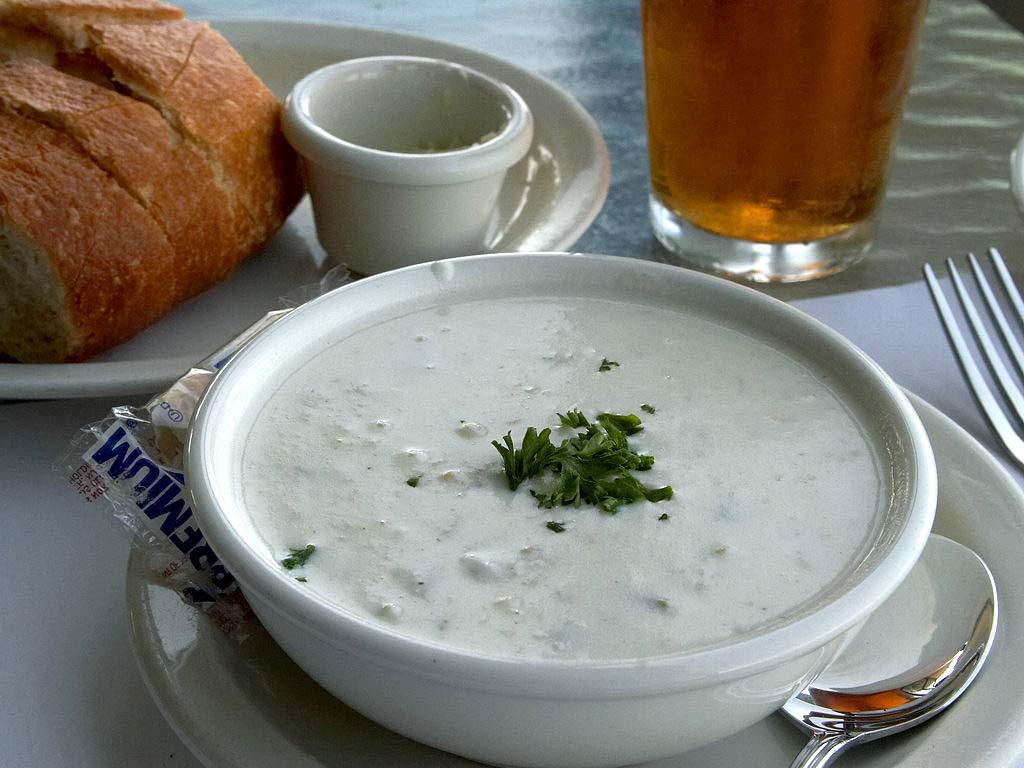
- New England clam chowder
- Type: Chowder
- Place of origin: United States
- Region or state: New England
- Invented: 18th century
- Main ingredients: Clams, potatoes, salt pork, and onions. Cream or tomatoes may be added.
- Variations: New England clam chowder, Manhattan clam chowder, Rhode Island clam chowder, others

Clam chowder is any of several chowder soups in American cuisine containing clams. In addition to clams, common ingredients include diced potatoes, salt pork, and onions. It is believed that clams were used in chowder because of the relative ease of harvesting them. Clam chowder is usually served with saltine crackers or small, hexagonal oyster crackers.

Clam chowder originated in the Northeastern United States, but is now commonly served in restaurants throughout the country. Many regional variations exist, but the three most popular are New England or "white" clam chowder, which is made with milk or cream; Manhattan or "red" clam chowder, which includes tomatoes instead; and Rhode Island or "clear" clam chowder, which omits both.

== History ==
Early documentation of "clam chowder" as known today did not contain milk and was thickened during cooking using crackers or stale bread. The first recipe for Manhattan clam chowder, with tomatoes and no milk, was published before 1919, and the current name was attested in 1934.

== Primary variants and styles ==
As recipes for clam chowder spread throughout the United States in the 19th and 20th centuries, many regionally developed variants have arisen.

=== New England clam chowder ===
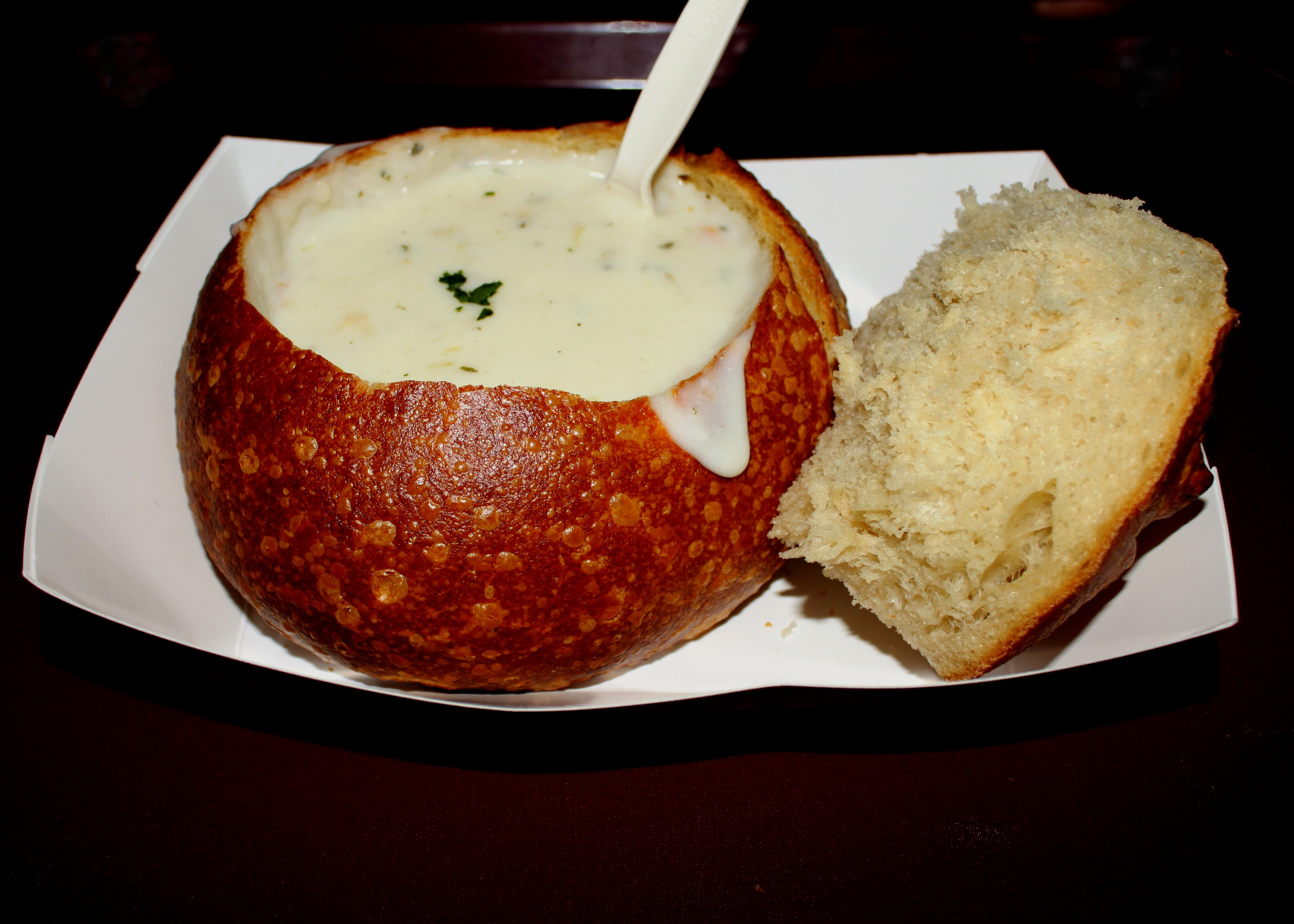
Clam chowder served in a bread bowl

New England clam chowder, occasionally referred to as Boston or Boston-style clam chowder, is a milk- or cream-based chowder, and is often of a thicker consistency than other regional styles. It is commonly made with milk, butter, potatoes, salt pork, onion, and clams. Flour or, historically, crushed hard tack may be added as a thickener.

New England clam chowder is usually accompanied by oyster crackers. Crackers may be crushed and mixed into the soup for thickener, or used as a garnish.

=== Manhattan clam chowder ===
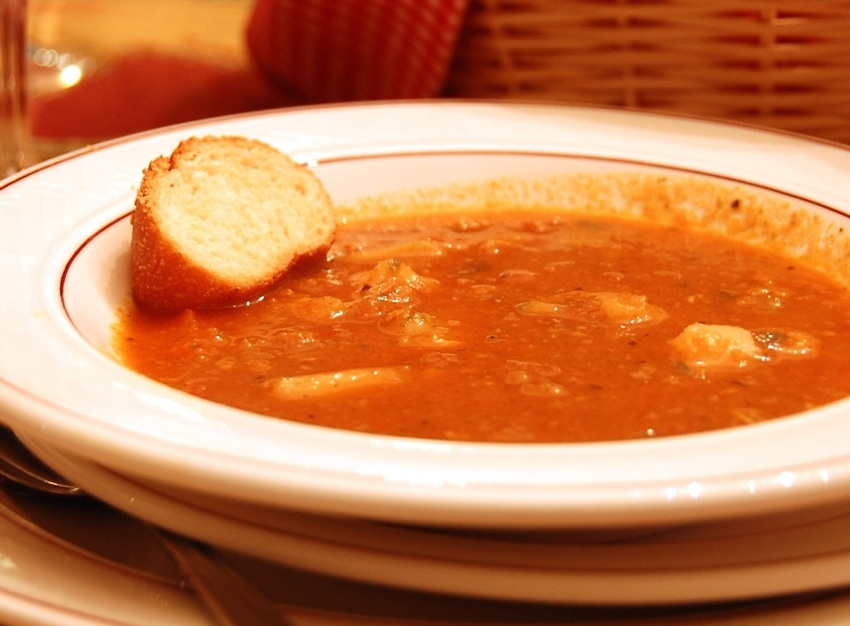
Manhattan clam chowder has a reddish color from tomatoes.

Manhattan clam chowder has a red, tomato-based broth and unlike New England clam chowder there is no milk or cream. Manhattan-style chowder also usually contains other vegetables, such as celery and carrots to create a mirepoix. Thyme is often used as a seasoning.

Many sources attribute its creation to Rhode Island's Portuguese fishing communities who were known both for their traditional tomato-based stews and for their frequent travels to New York City's Fulton Fish Market during the mid-1800s. While Rhode Island clam chowder is clear, it was relatively common in Rhode Island for some cooks to add tomato sauce to their chowder. In Rhode Island this style chowder is also frequently referred to as "Rocky Point Clam Chowder" as it was a popular menu item at the Rocky Point Amusement Park Shore Dinner Hall since the park opened in 1847.

This chowder was at times called by various names including "Clam Chowder – Coney Island Style" (1893). Manhattan clam chowder is included in Victor Hirtzler's Hotel St. Francis Cookbook (1919) and "The Delmonico Cook Book" (1890) as "clam chowder". The "Manhattan" name is first attested in a 1934 cookbook.

=== Rhode Island clam chowder ===
Rhode Island clam chowder is made with clear broth, and contains no milk, butter or tomatoes. It is common in southeastern Rhode Island through eastern Connecticut. In Rhode Island, it is sometimes called "South County Style" referring to Washington County, where it apparently originated.

=== Long Island clam chowder ===
Long Island clam chowder is part New England–style and part Manhattan-style, making it a pinkish creamy tomato clam chowder. The name is intended as humorous: Long Island is between Manhattan and New England. The two parent chowders are typically cooked separately before being poured in the same bowl. This variant is popular in many small restaurants across Suffolk County, New York.

=== Hatteras clam chowder ===
Served throughout North Carolina's Outer Banks region, this simple variation of clam chowder has clear broth, bacon, potatoes, and onions. It is usually seasoned with generous amounts of black pepper.

=== Minorcan clam chowder ===
Minorcan clam chowder is a spicy traditional version found in restaurants in northeastern Florida, particularly in St. Augustine. It has a tomato broth base, and includes Spanish datil pepper, an extremely hot chili comparable to the habanero.

== See also ==
- Bisque
- Corn chowder
- Cream of mushroom soup
- Fish stew
- List of clam dishes
- List of cream soups
- List of fish and seafood soups
- List of regional dishes of the United States
- Oyster stew
