= Clam juice =

Broth obtained from clams

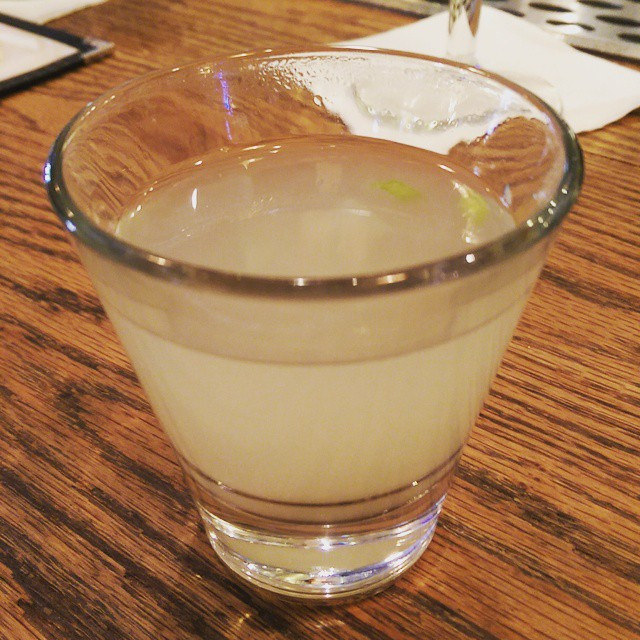
A shot glass of clam juice

Clam juice is a broth derived from steamed clams, which can be consumed on its own or used as an ingredient in various dishes and beverages.

== Preparation ==
Clam juice is typically prepared from the liquid obtained from steamed clams. Clam juice may be prepared fresh for consumption, or purchased in prepared bottled form. Some companies mass-produce prepared clam juice, which is made by steaming fresh clams in water with salt, collecting the extracted liquid known as clam extract or clam liquor, and then filtering it.

In 1937, William G. Frazier invented a clam opener devised to easily open clams and retain all of the clam juice, which was collected in a bowl. A patent for the clam opener was issued by the United States Patent and Trademark Office on November 15, 1938.

== Use in dishes ==
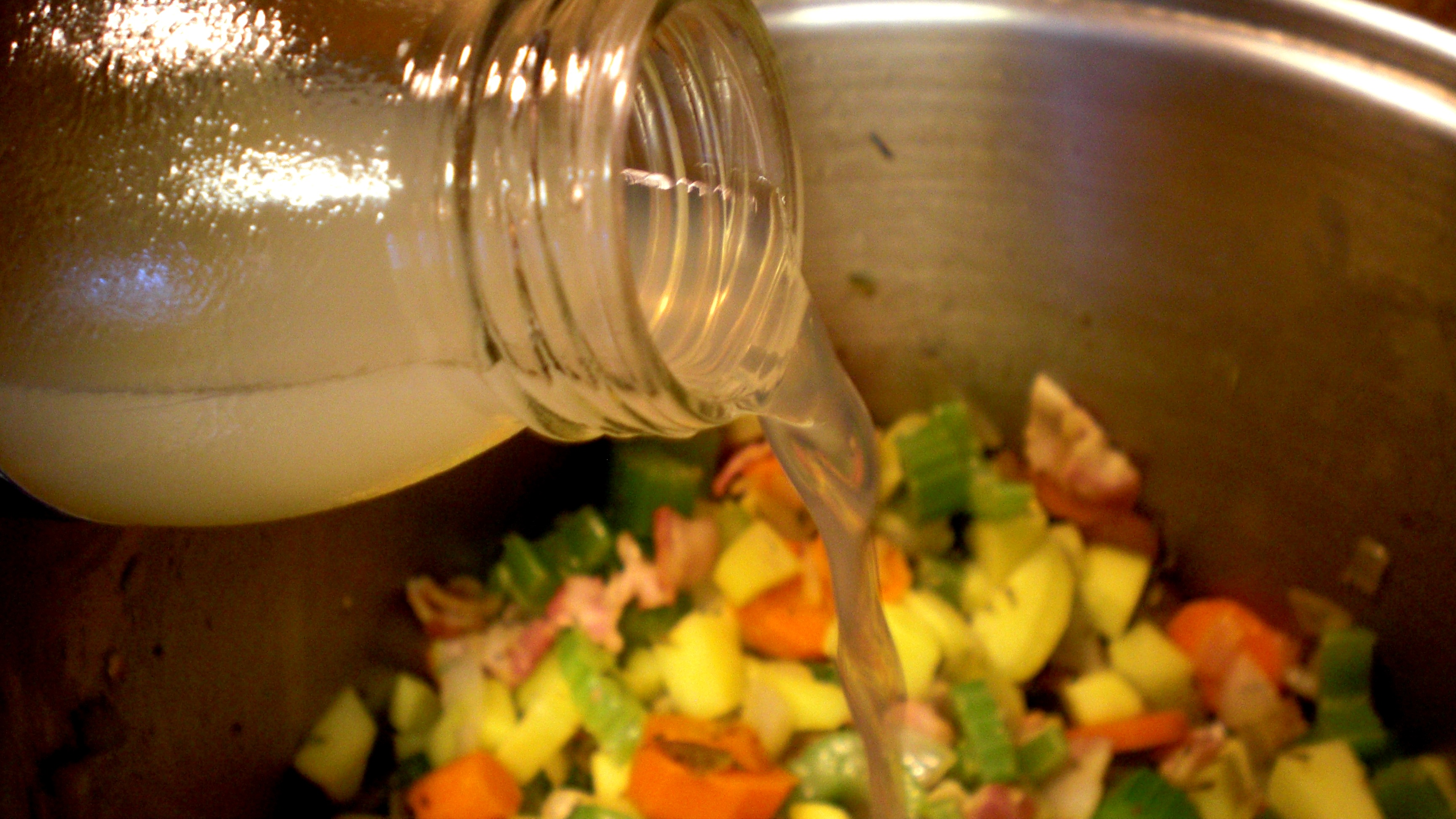
Bottled clam juice being used in the preparation of clam chowder

Clam juice is sometimes used in the preparation of clam chowder and other chowders. It may be used as an ingredient in various sauces and meat sauces, seafood dishes, in soup bases, and as a condiment to top foods, similar to the manner that fish sauce may be used.

Italian chefs sometimes use clam juice as an ingredient in seafood dishes and pasta sauces. It is sometimes used during the deglazing process in cooking. It may provide a mineral-like flavor to dishes, and serve as a substrate to assist in combining flavors present in a dish.

== As a beverage ==
Some restaurants and bars in the US serve shots of pure clam juice. For example, the Old Clam House in San Francisco, California serves a shot glass of hot clam juice at the beginning of each meal. In the early 1900s in the United States, clam juice was purported to be a hangover remedy.

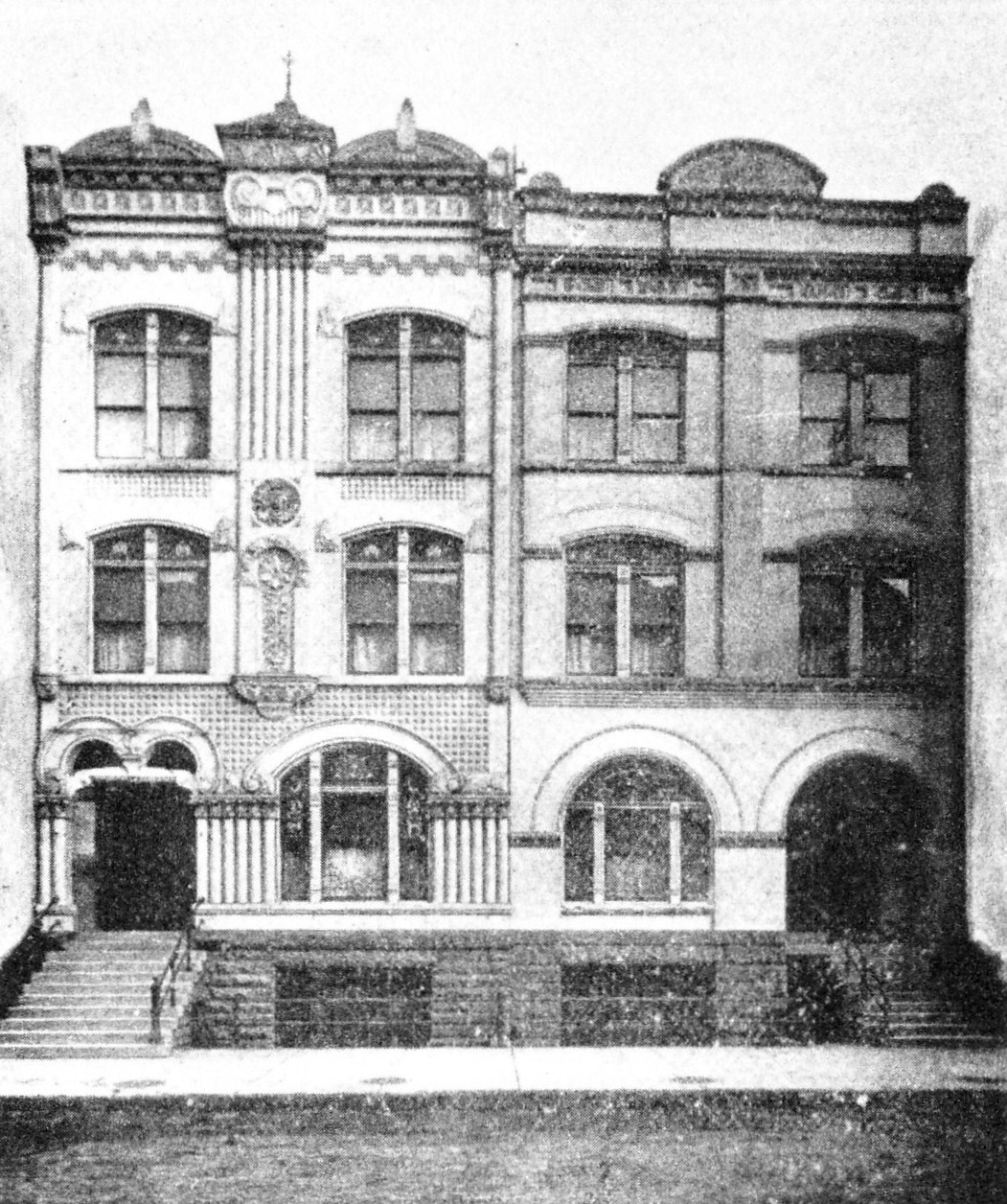
Exterior of the Everleigh Club, circa 1911

The Everleigh Club, a former brothel in Chicago, Illinois, that was in operation from 1900 to October 1911, would serve iced clam juice and a tablet of aspirin as a starter for breakfast, which began at 2:00 in the afternoon.

== Beverages with clam juice ==
=== Soda fountains ===
In the United States in the early 1900s, clam juice was used as an ingredient for various beverages at soda fountains. Beverages prepared with clam juice included hot clam juice, hot clam soda, hot ginger clam broth, hot celery punch, hot clam cream, clam night cap, tomato clam broth and others.

During this time, a recipe for hot clam juice used one-half to one-ounce of clam juice in an eight-ounce glass, the remainder of which was filled with hot water. Accompaniments included soda crackers, celery salt, salt and pepper. The beverage was sometimes prepared with the addition of milk or hot milk. The addition of a small portion of butter would enhance the flavor of hot clam juice.

=== Cocktails ===
In contemporary times, clam juice is sometimes used as an ingredient or drink mixer in cocktails, such as the Caesar, also known as a Bloody Caesar. Cartoonist Charles Addams invented the Gravel Gertie: a cocktail made with one part tomato juice, one part clam juice, a slug of 100-proof vodka and a dash of Tabasco sauce.

=== Clamato ===
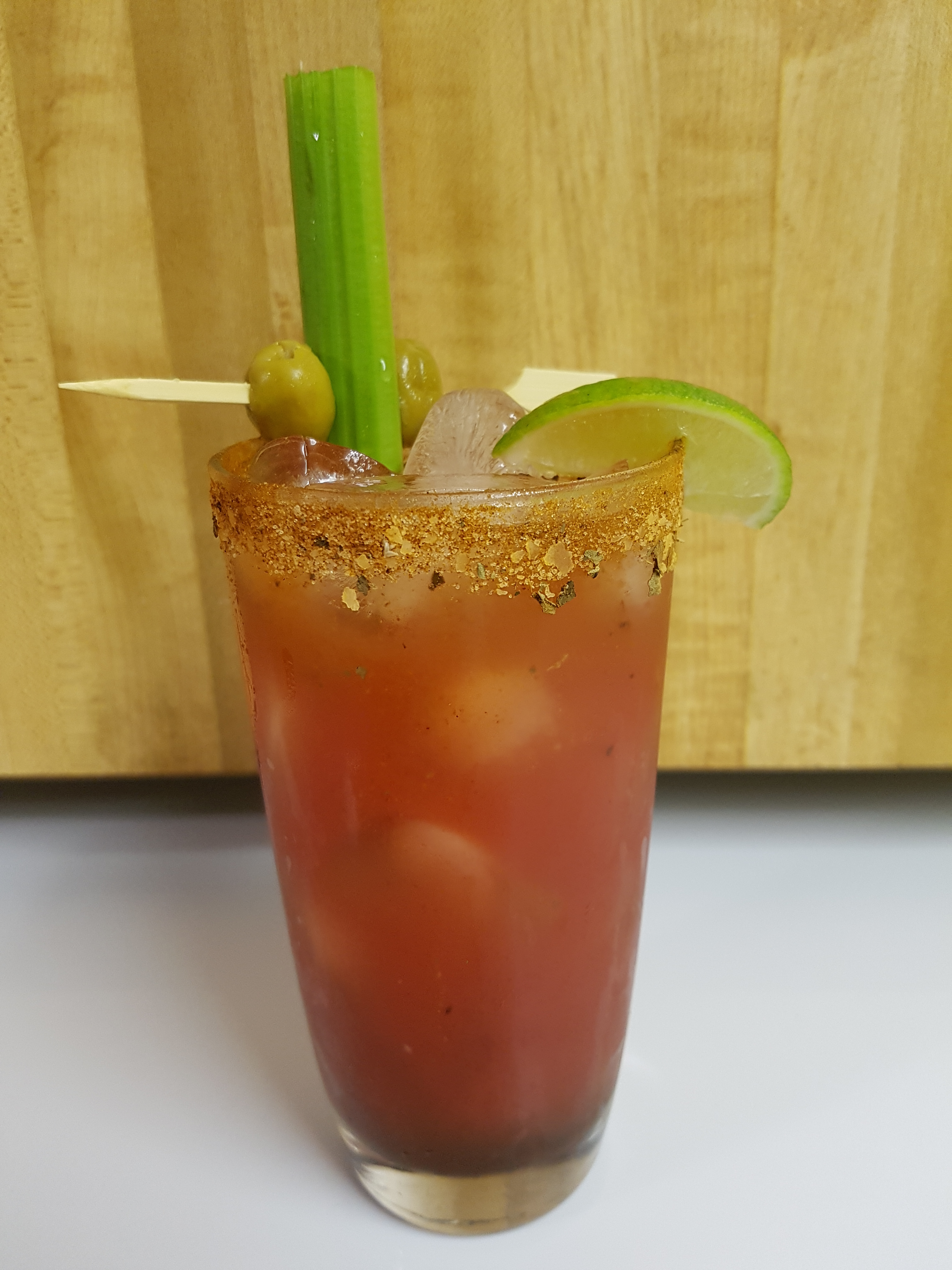
A Caesar cocktail prepared with Clamato

Clamato is a mass-produced beverage prepared with tomato juice concentrate, clam juice and spices. It also contains high-fructose corn syrup, monosodium glutamate, salt and ascorbic acid. Clamato is used as an ingredient in the Caesar cocktail. The michelada, a beer cocktail, is sometimes prepared using Clamato as an ingredient.

== See also ==
- Clam sauce
- Fred Fear & Company – a former U.S. purveyor of clam juice
- List of juices
- Oyster sauce
