= Clam =

Common name for several kinds of bivalve mollusc

Clam is a common name for several species of bivalve mollusc. The word is often applied only to those that are deemed edible and live as infauna, spending most of their lives halfway buried in the sand of the sea floor or riverbeds. Clams have two shells of equal size connected by two adductor muscles and have a powerful burrowing foot. They live in both freshwater and marine environments; in salt water they prefer to burrow down into the mud. The turbidity of the water required varies with species and location; the greatest diversity of these is in North America.

Clams in the culinary sense do not live attached to a substrate (whereas oysters and mussels do) and do not live near the bottom (whereas scallops do). In culinary usage, clams are commonly eaten marine bivalves, as in clam digging and the resulting soup, clam chowder. Many edible clams, such as palourde clams, are ovoid or triangular; however, razor clams have an elongated parallel-sided shell, suggesting an old-fashioned straight razor.

Some clams have life cycles of only one year, whilst at least one reached an age of more than 500 years. All clams have two calcareous shells or valves joined near a hinge with a flexible ligament and all are filter feeders.

== Anatomy ==
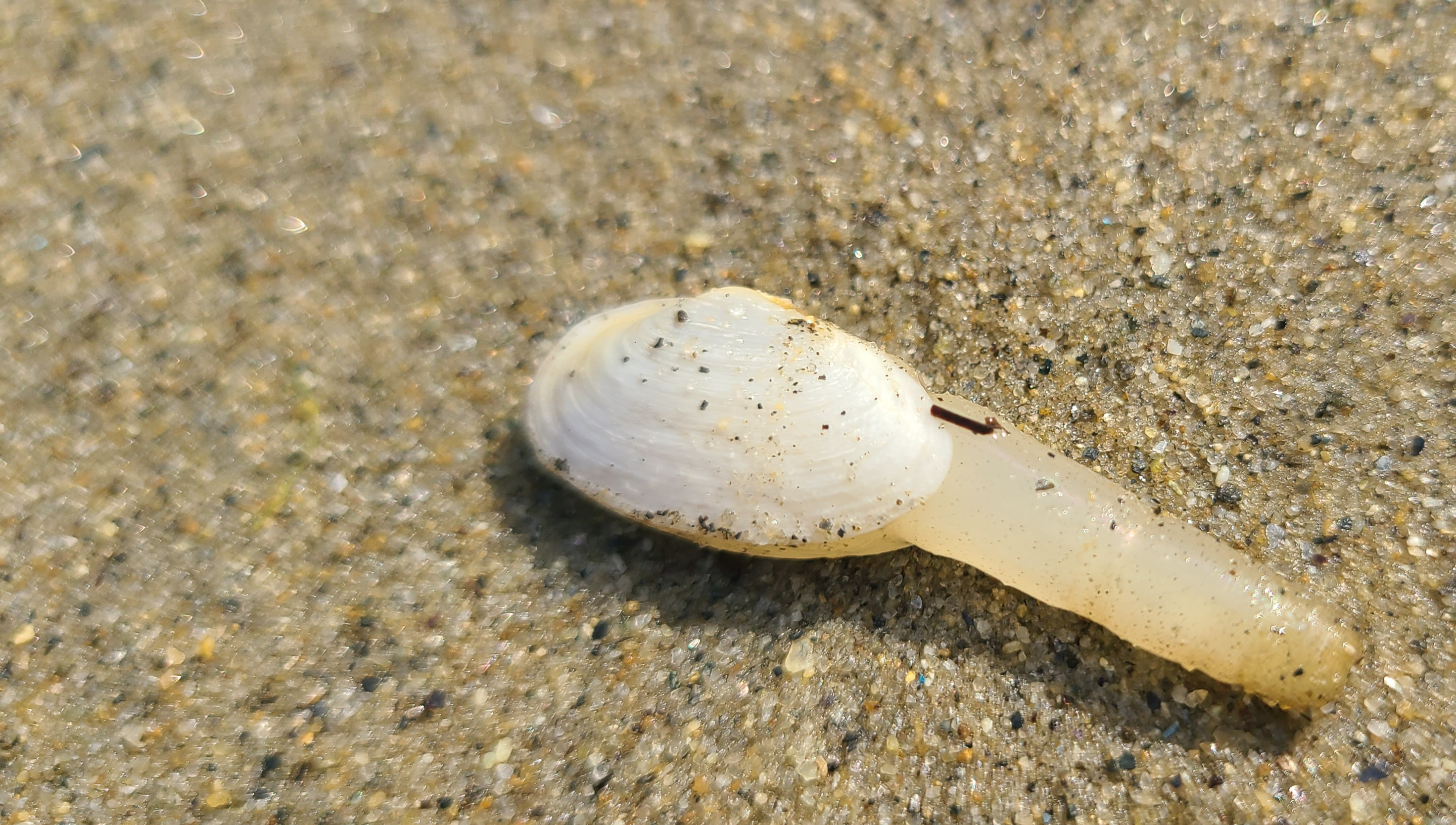
Clam with its siphon out

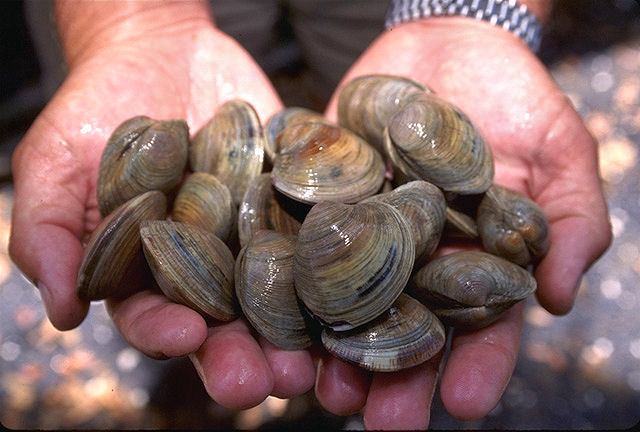
Littleneck clams, small hard clams, species Mercenaria mercenaria

A clam's shell consists of two (usually equal) valves, which are connected by a hinge joint and a ligament that can be internal or external. The ligament provides tension to bring the valves apart, whilst one or two adductor muscles can contract to close the valves. Clams also have kidneys, a heart, a mouth, a stomach, and a nervous system. Many have a siphon.

== Food source and ecology ==
Clams are shellfish that make up an important part of the web of life that keeps the seas functioning, both as filter feeders and as a food source for many different animals. Extant mammals that eat clams include both the Pacific and Atlantic species of walrus, all known subspecies of harbour seals in both the Atlantic and Pacific, most species of sea lions, including the California sea lion, bearded seals and even species of river otters that will consume the freshwater species found in Asia and North America. Birds of all kinds will also eat clams if they can catch them in the littoral zone: roseate spoonbills of North and South America, the Eurasian oystercatcher, whooping crane and common crane, the American flamingo of Florida and the Caribbean Sea, and the common sandpiper are just a handful of the numerous birds that feast on clams all over the world. Most species of octopus have clams as a staple of their diet, up to and including the giants like the Giant Pacific octopus.

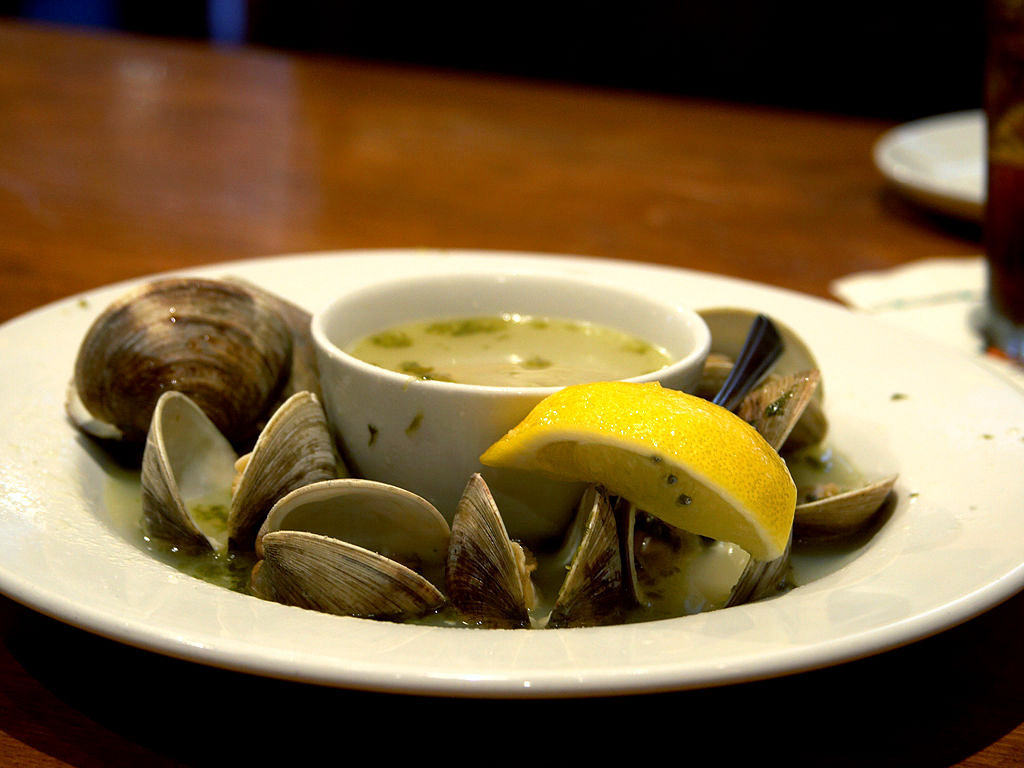
A clam dish

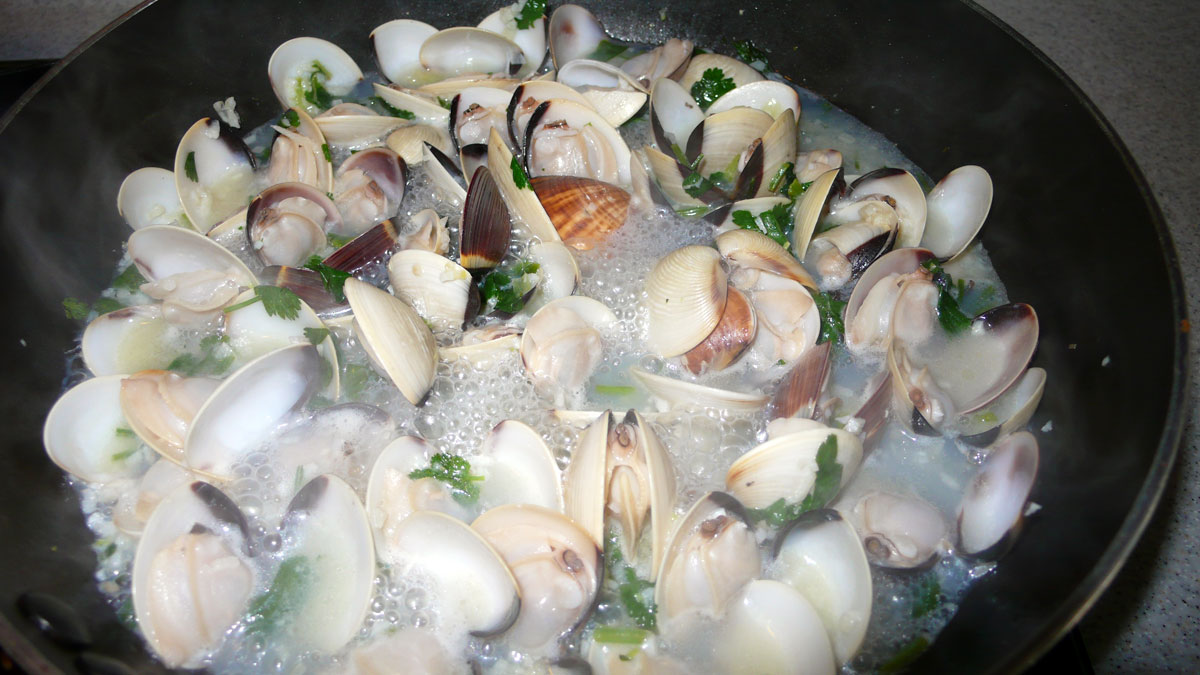
Clams simmering in a white wine sauce

== Culinary ==
Cultures around the world eat clams along with many other types of shellfish.

=== North America ===
In culinary use, within the eastern coast of the United States and large swathes of the Maritimes of Canada, the term "clam" most often refers to the hard clam, Mercenaria mercenaria. It may also refer to a few other common edible species, such as the soft-shell clam, Mya arenaria, and the ocean quahog, Arctica islandica. Another species commercially exploited on the Atlantic Coast of the United States is the surf clam, Spisula solidissima. Scallops are also used for food nationwide, but not cockles: they are more difficult to get than in Europe because of their habit of being further out in the tide than European species on the West Coast, and on the East Coast they are often found in salt marshes and mudflats where mosquitoes are abundant. There are several edible species in the Eastern United States: Americardia media, also known as the strawberry cockle, is found from Cape Hatteras down into the Caribbean Sea and all of Florida; Trachycardium muricatum has a similar range to the strawberry cockle; and Dinocardium robustum, which grows to be many times the size of the European cockle. Historically, they were caught on a small scale on the Outer Banks, barrier islands off North Carolina, and put in soups, steamed or pickled.

Up and down the coast of the Eastern U.S., the bamboo clam, Ensis directus, is prized by Americans for making clam strips, although because of its nature of burrowing into the sand very close to the beach, it cannot be harvested by mechanical means without damaging the beaches. The bamboo clam is also notorious for having a very sharp edge of its shell, and when harvested by hand must be handled with great care.

On the U.S. West Coast, there are several species that have been consumed for thousands of years, evidenced by middens full of clamshells near the shore and their consumption by nations including the Chumash of California, the Nisqually of Washington state and the Tsawwassen of British Columbia. The butter clam, Saxidomus gigantea, the Pacific razor clam, Siliqua patula, gaper clams Tresus capax, the geoduck clam, Panopea generosa and the Pismo clam, Tivela stultorum are all eaten as delicacies.

Clams can be eaten raw, steamed, boiled, baked or fried. They can also be made into clam chowder, clams casino, clam cakes, or stuffies, or they can be cooked using hot rocks and seaweed in a New England clam bake. On the West Coast, they are an ingredient in making cioppino and local variants of ceviche.

=== Asia ===
==== India ====
Clams are eaten more in the coastal regions of India, especially in the Konkan, Kerala, Bengal and coastal regions of Karnataka, Tamil Nadu regions.

In Kerala, clams are used to make curries and fried with coconut. In the Malabar region it is known as "elambakka" and in middle kerala it is known as "kakka". Clam curry made with coconut is a dish from Malabar especially in the Thalassery region. On the southwestern coast of India, also known as the Konkan region of Maharashtra, clams are used in curries and side dishes, like Tisaryachi Ekshipi, which is clams with one shell on. Beary Muslim households in the Mangalore region prepare a main dish with clams called Kowldo Pinde. In Udupi and Mangalore regions, it is called marvai in the local Tulu language. It is used to prepare many dishes like marvai sukka, marvai gassi, and marvai pundi.

==== Japan ====
In Japan, clams are often an ingredient of mixed seafood dishes. They can also be made into hot pot, miso soup or tsukudani. The more commonly used varieties of clams in Japanese cooking are the Shijimi (Corbicula japonica), the Asari (Venerupis philippinarum) and the Hamaguri (Meretrix lusoria).

=== Europe ===
==== Great Britain ====
The rocky terrain and pebbly shores of the seacoast that surrounds Great Britain provide ample habitat for shellfish including clams. Historically, British cuisine has been more heavily based on beef and dairy products than seafood, although there is evidence going back to before most recorded history of coastal shell middens near Weymouth and present-day York. Much of the seafood cultivated for aquaculture or commercial harvesting is exported, and 70% of this goes to the European Union, though present-day younger populations are eating more of the catch than a generation ago.

Staple favourites of the British public and local scavengers include the razorfish, Ensis siliqua, a slightly smaller cousin of the bamboo clam of eastern North America. These can be found for sale in open-air markets like Billingsgate Market in London; they have a similar taste to their North American cousin. Cockles, specifically the common cockle, are a staple find on beaches in western Wales and further north in the Dee Estuary. The accidentally introduced hard-shell quahog is also found in British waters, mainly those near England, and does see some use in British cuisine. The Palourde clam by far is the most common native clam and it is both commercially harvested as well as locally collected, and Spisula solida, a relative of the Atlantic surf clam on the other side of the Atlantic, is seeing increased interest as a food source and aquaculture candidate; it is mainly found in the British Isles in Europe.

==== Italy ====
In Italy, clams are often an ingredient of mixed seafood dishes or are eaten together with pasta. The more commonly used variety of clams in Italian cooking is the vongola (Venerupis decussata), although regional cuisines include the tellina or arsella (Donax trunculus), the fasolaro o fasolara (Callista chione), the cannolicchio (Solen marginatus, a kind of Razor clam), and the Tartufo di mare (Venus verrucosa).

== Religion ==
In Islam, clams are considered halal in three Sunni madhhabs, but not in Hanafi, as only fish are considered halal in Hanafi jurisprudence, not other aquatic animals. In Judaism, clams are not kosher.

Similarly, Orthodox Christianity permits shellfish during the fasting period of Great Lent, when other fish with backbones are excluded.

== As currency ==
Some species of clam, particularly Mercenaria mercenaria, were in the past used by the Algonquians of Eastern North America to manufacture wampum, a type of sacred jewellery; and to make shell money.

== Species ==
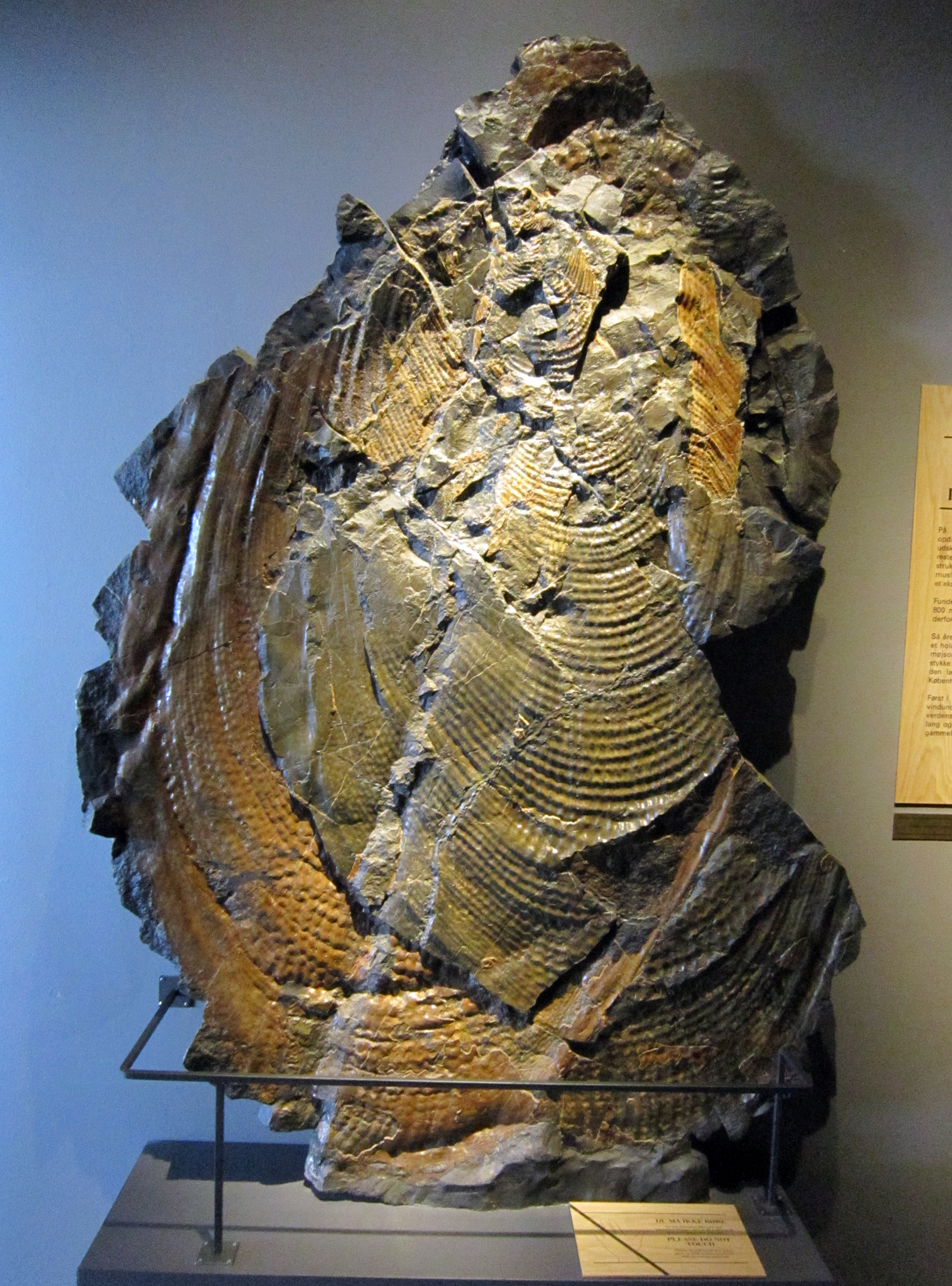
One of the world's largest clam fossils (187 cm), a Sphenoceramus steenstrupi specimen from Greenland in the Geological Museum in Copenhagen.

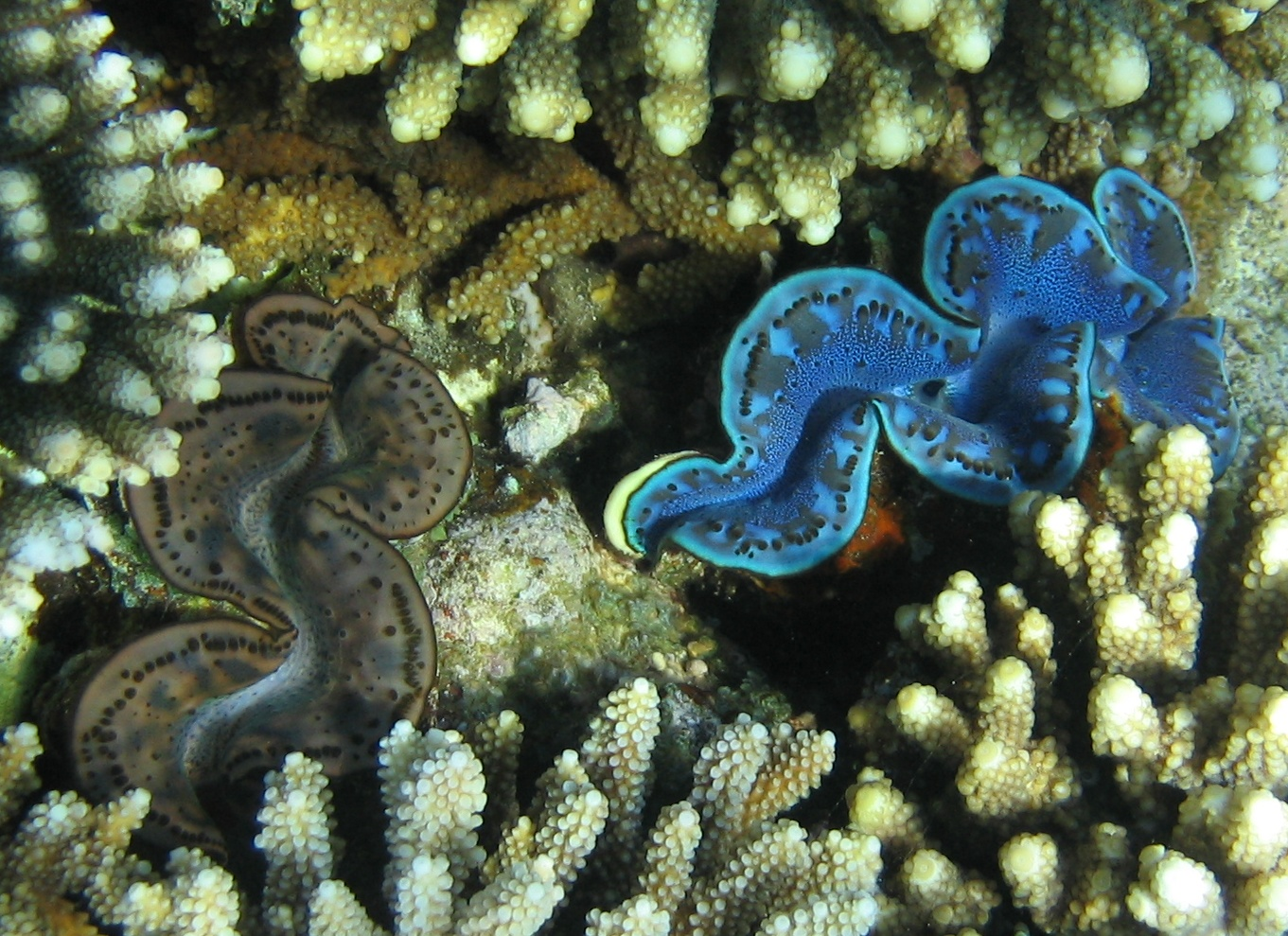
Maxima clam, Tridacna maxima

Edible:

- Ark clams, family Arcidae (most popular in Indonesia and Singapore)
- Atlantic jackknife clam: Ensis directus
- Atlantic surf clam: Spisula solidissima
- Common cockle: Cerastoderma edule (Native to most of Europe, with very large populations in Ireland and Great Britain)
- Atlantic Giant Cockle: Dinocardium robustum
- Geoduck: Panopea abrupta or Panope generosa (largest burrowing clam in the world)
- Gould's razor shell, Solen strictus (popular in Korea, Japan, and Taiwan)
- Grooved carpet shell: Ruditapes decussatus
- Hard clam or Northern Quahog: Mercenaria mercenaria (Native to Eastern USA and Maritime Canada)
- Lyrate Asiatic hard clam: Meretrix lyrata
- Manila clam: Venerupis philippinarum
- Ocean quahog: Arctica islandica
- Pacific razor clam: Siliqua patula
- Pipis, Plebidonax deltoides and Paphies australis
- Pismo clam: Tivela stultorum
- Pod razor clam: Ensis siliqua
- Spoot: Ensis magnus
- Soft clam: Mya arenaria

Not usually considered edible:

- Nut clams or pointed nut clams, family Nuculidae
- Duck clams or trough shells, family Mactridae
- Marsh clams, family Corbiculidae
- File clams, family Limidae
- Giant clam: Tridacna gigas This clam is native to East Asia and is edible, but should be avoided because of slow reproduction.
- Asian or Asiatic clam: genus Corbicula
- Peppery furrow shell: Scrobicularia plana

== See also ==
- List of clam dishes – dishes and foods prepared using clams
- Clam juice – Broth obtained from clams
- Geoduck – Species of bivalve
- Mussel – Bivalve mollusc
- Oyster – Variety of families of Mollusca
- Scallop – Family of shellfish, many edible
- Shipworm – Family of molluscs
- Clamshell (container)
- Clamshell design
- Water purification – Process of removing impurities from water
