= List of fish dishes =

This is a list of notable fish dishes. In culinary and fishery contexts, fish includes shellfish, such as molluscs, crustaceans and echinoderms. Fish has been an important source of protein for humans throughout recorded history.

== Fish dishes ==
=== Alphabetical list ===
==== A ====
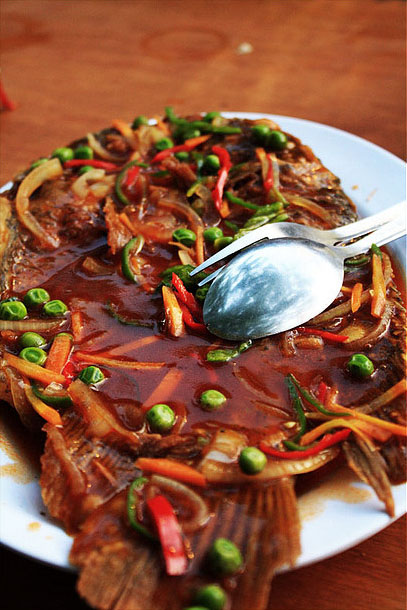
Asam pedas prepared with giant gourami

- À l'amiral
- Ackee and saltfish – Jamaican national dish
- Acqua pazza – Italian poached white fish or broth
- Agujjim – Korean spicy angler fish dish
- Amplang – Indonesian fish cracker snack
- Arsik – Indonesian spicy fish dish
- Asam pedas – Southeast Asian dish

==== B ====
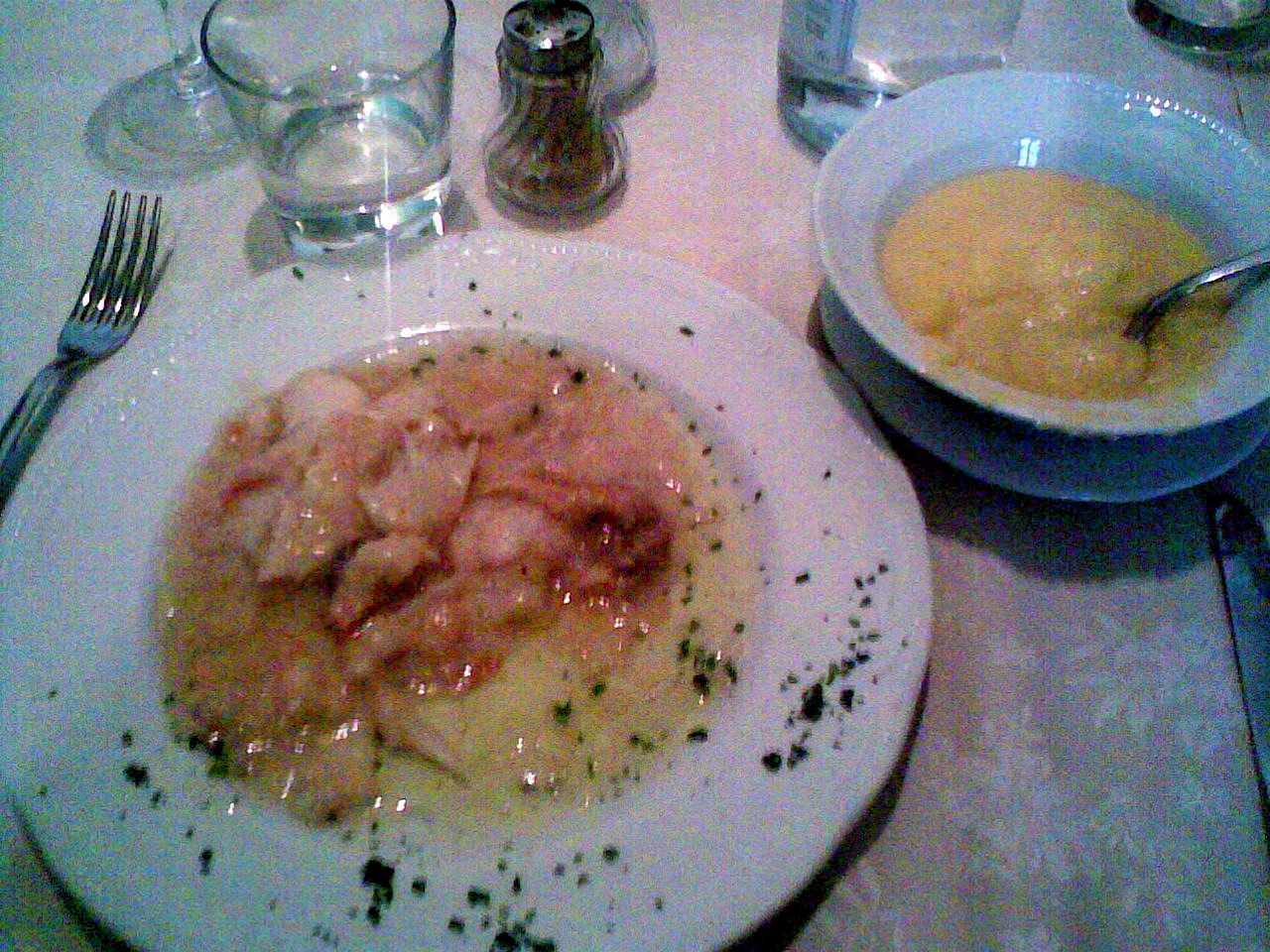
Baccalà alla vicentina is a Venetian-Italian dish native to Vicenza that is made from stoccafisso (stockfish).

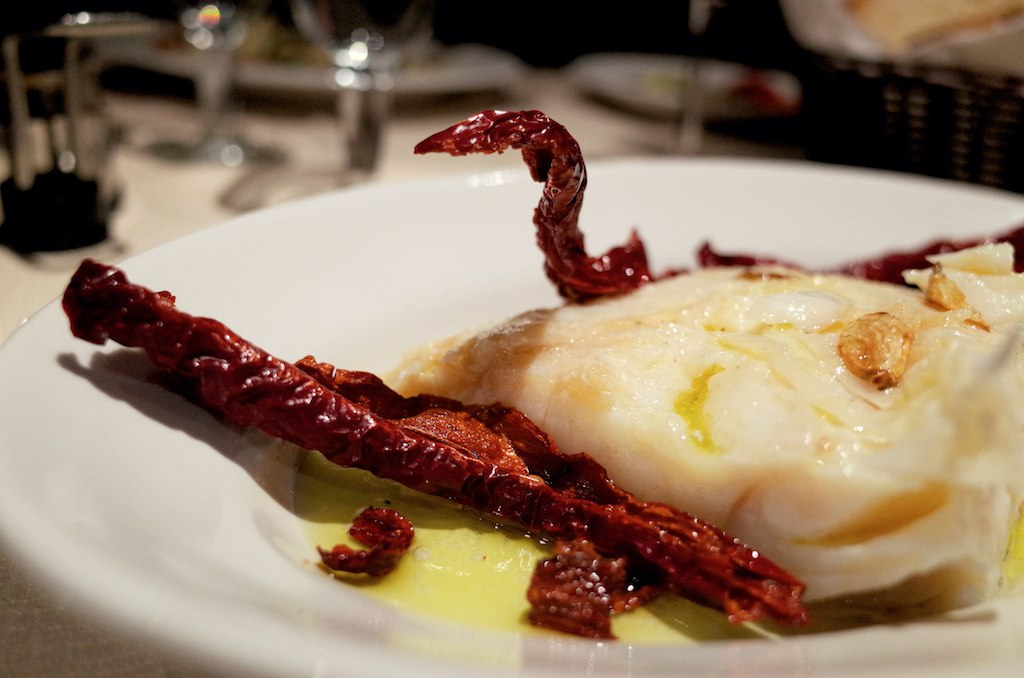
Baccalà alla lucana, traditional recipe from Basilicata

- Bacalaíto – Codfish fritter from Puerto Rico
- Bacalhau à Brás – Portuguese salt cod dish
- Bacalhau à Gomes de Sá – Typical fish from Porto, Portugal
- Bacalhau à Zé do Pipo – Bacalhau casserole
- Bacalhau com natas – Salt cod casserole
- Bacalhau com todos – Cod recipe in Portuguese cuisine
- Baccalà all'abruzzese – Italian dish
- Baccalà alla lucana – Christmas dish of cod and red peppers from Basilicata, Italy
- Baccalà alla vicentina – Traditional dish from Vicenza, Italy
- Bagoong isda – Type of Philippine condiment
- Bánh canh – Vietnamese soup with thick rice noodles
- Bermuda fish chowder – Soup considered the national dish of Bermuda
- Bombay duck – Species of fish
- Bouillabaisse – Traditional Provençal fish soup
- Bourdeto – Fish dish from Corfu
- Brandade – Dish of cod, olive oil, and potatoes
- Brathering – Traditional German dish
- Brudet – Fish stew from Croatia
- Burong isda – Filipino dish of pickled rice and fish

==== C ====
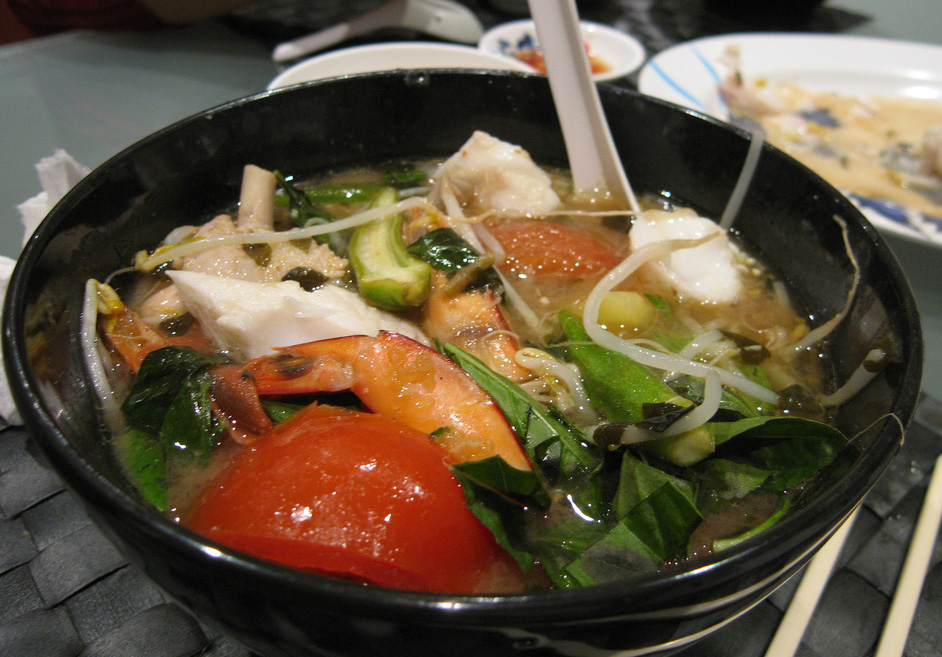
Canh chua is a sour soup indigenous to the Mekong Delta region of southern Vietnam. It is typically made with fish from the Mekong River Delta and additional ingredients.

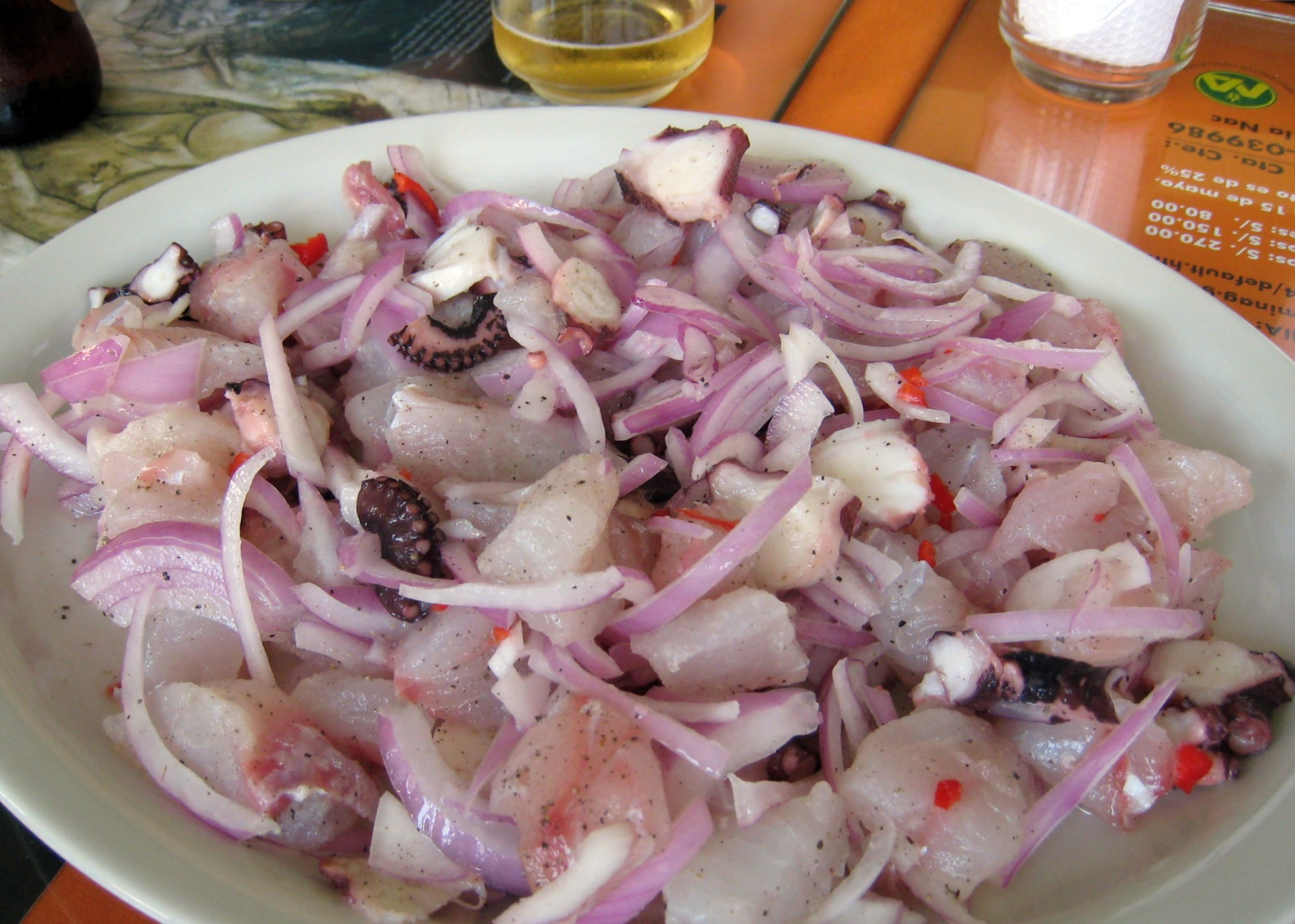
Ceviche is typically made from fresh raw fish cured in citrus juices, such as lemon or lime, and spiced with ají or chili peppers.

- Cabbie claw – Fish dish
- Caldeirada – Portuguese and Galician fish stew
- Caldillo de congrio – Chilean fish soup
- Canh chua – Vietnamese sour soup dish
- Cappon magro – Italian seafood salad
- Catfish stew – Dish in Southern United States
- Ceviche – Dish of marinated raw seafood
- Chhencheda
- Christmas carp – Traditional fish dish in Central Europe
- Chueo-tang – Korean pond loach soup
- Cioppino – Italian-American fish stew originating in San Francisco
- Coulibiac – Russian fish pie
- Crappit heid – Traditional Scottish fish head dish
- Cullen skink – Scottish smoked haddock soup

==== D ====
- Dahi machha – Traditional Odia fish dish
- Daing – Dried fished from the Philippines
- Dishwasher salmon – Method of cooking fish
- Dojo nabe – Japanese hot pot dish
- Dressed herring – Soviet layered salad

==== E ====
- Encebollado – Ecuadorian fish stew
- Eomandu – Fish dumpling
- Escabeche – Ibero-American fish, meat or vegetable dish
- Esgarrat – Valencian cod dish
- Esqueixada – Catalan fish salad

==== F ====
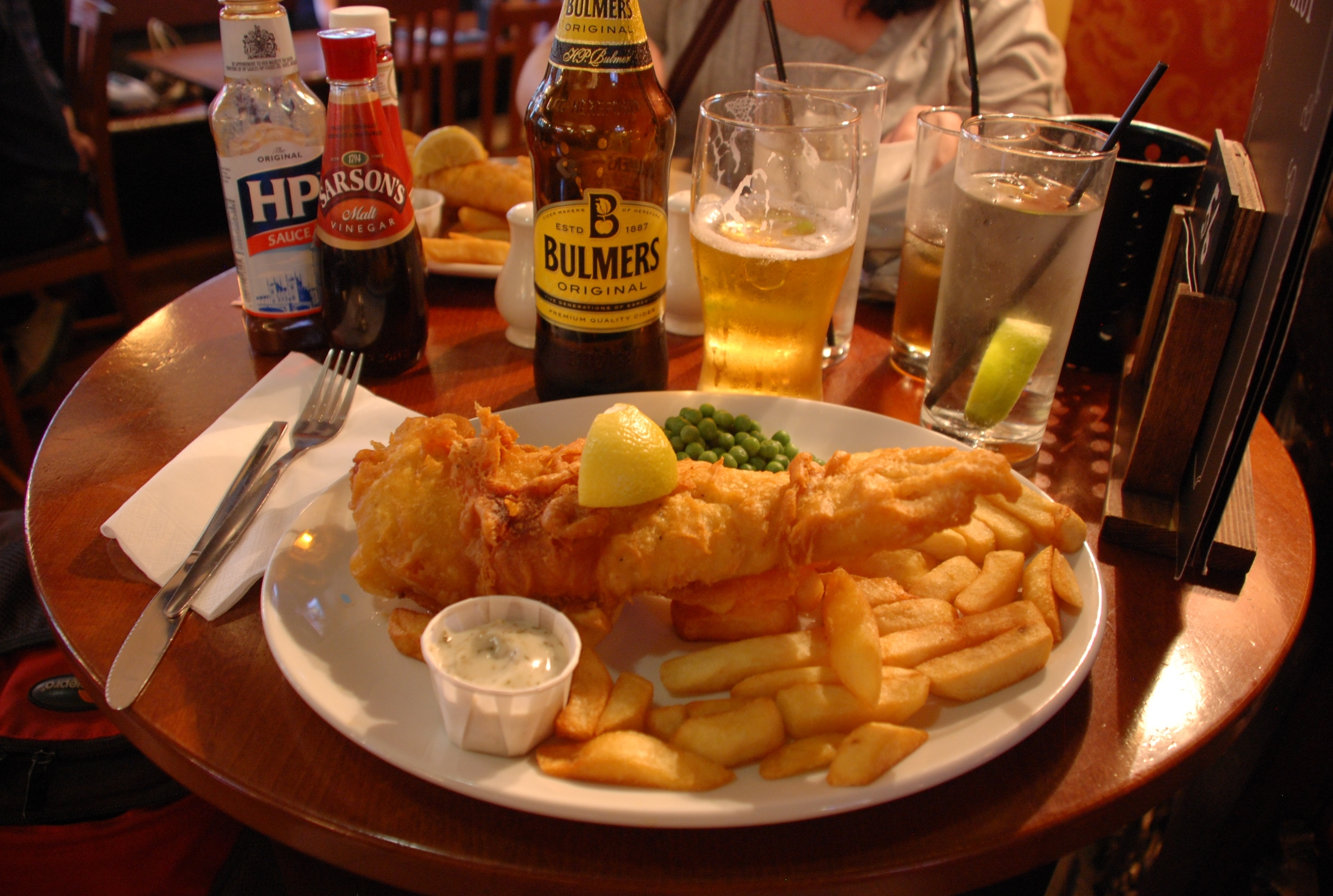
Fish and chips in Edinburgh, Scotland

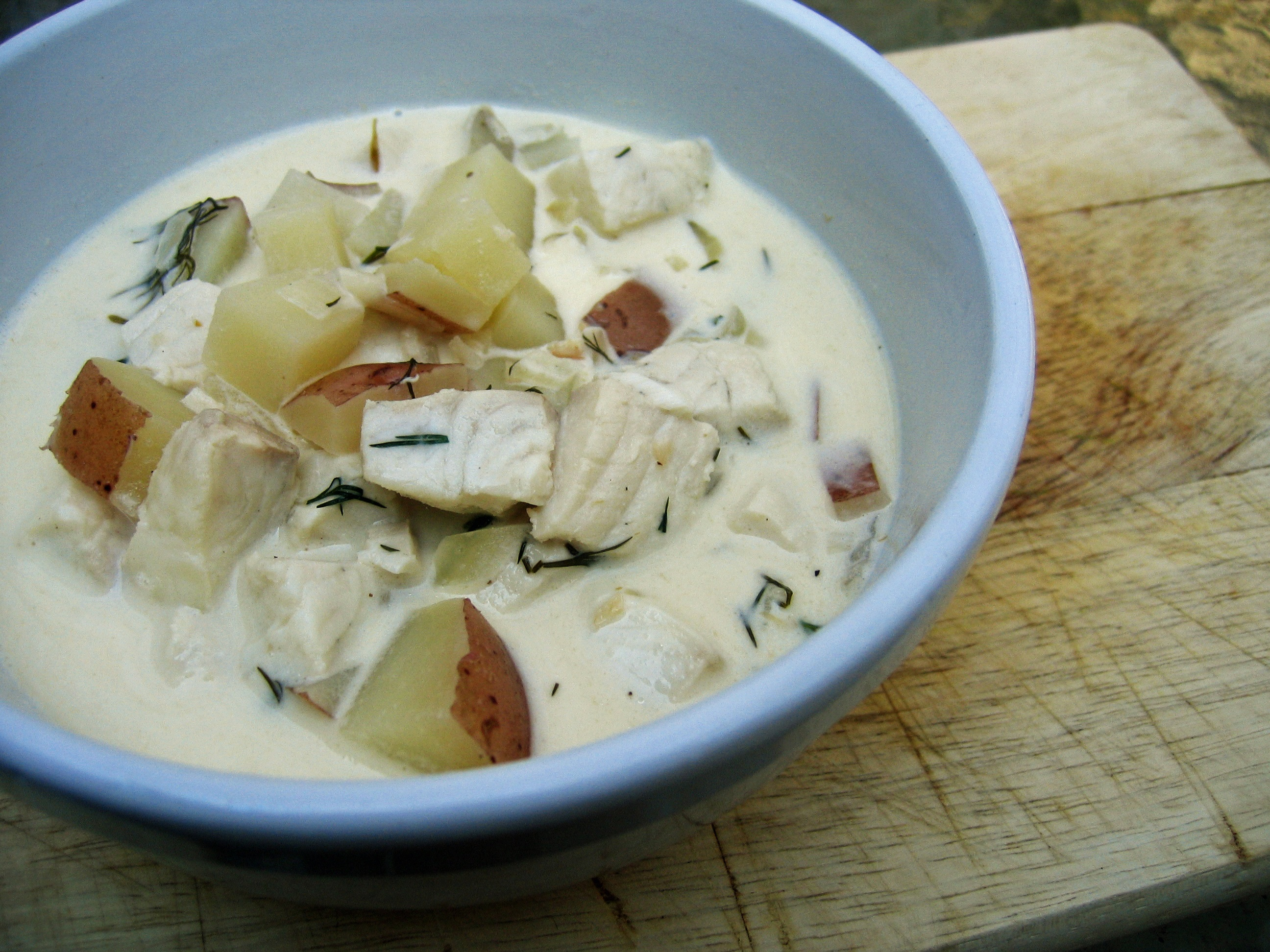
Fish chowder

- Fischbrötchen – Type of sandwich made with fish
- Fish and brewis – Canadian dish
- Fish and chips – British fried fish and fried potato dish
- Fish ball – Spherical food item made from fish
- Fish boil – Culinary tradition in areas of Wisconsin
- Fish chowder – Category of soups
- Fish fingers – Breaded processed fish
- Fish finger sandwich – Sandwich primarily containing fish fingers
- Fish head casserole – Chinese cuisine
- Fish head curry – Indonesian, Malaysian and Singaporean curry dish
- Fish moolie – Spicy fish and coconut dish
- Fish pie – Pie with the main ingredient being fish
- Fish soup – Dish
- Fish steak – Cut of fish
- Fish tacos – Mexican filled tortilla dish
- Fish tea – Spicy soup in Caribbean cuisine
- Fishcake – Fried minced or ground seafood
- Fisherman's soup – Hungarian fish soup

==== G ====
- Ginataang isda – Filipino fish stew
- Gefilte fish – Ashkenazi Jewish dish made from ground fish

==== H ====
- Herring soup – Fish soup
- Hongeohoe – Korean fermented fish dish
- Huachinango a la Veracruzana – Classic fish dish from Veracruz, Mexico

==== I ====
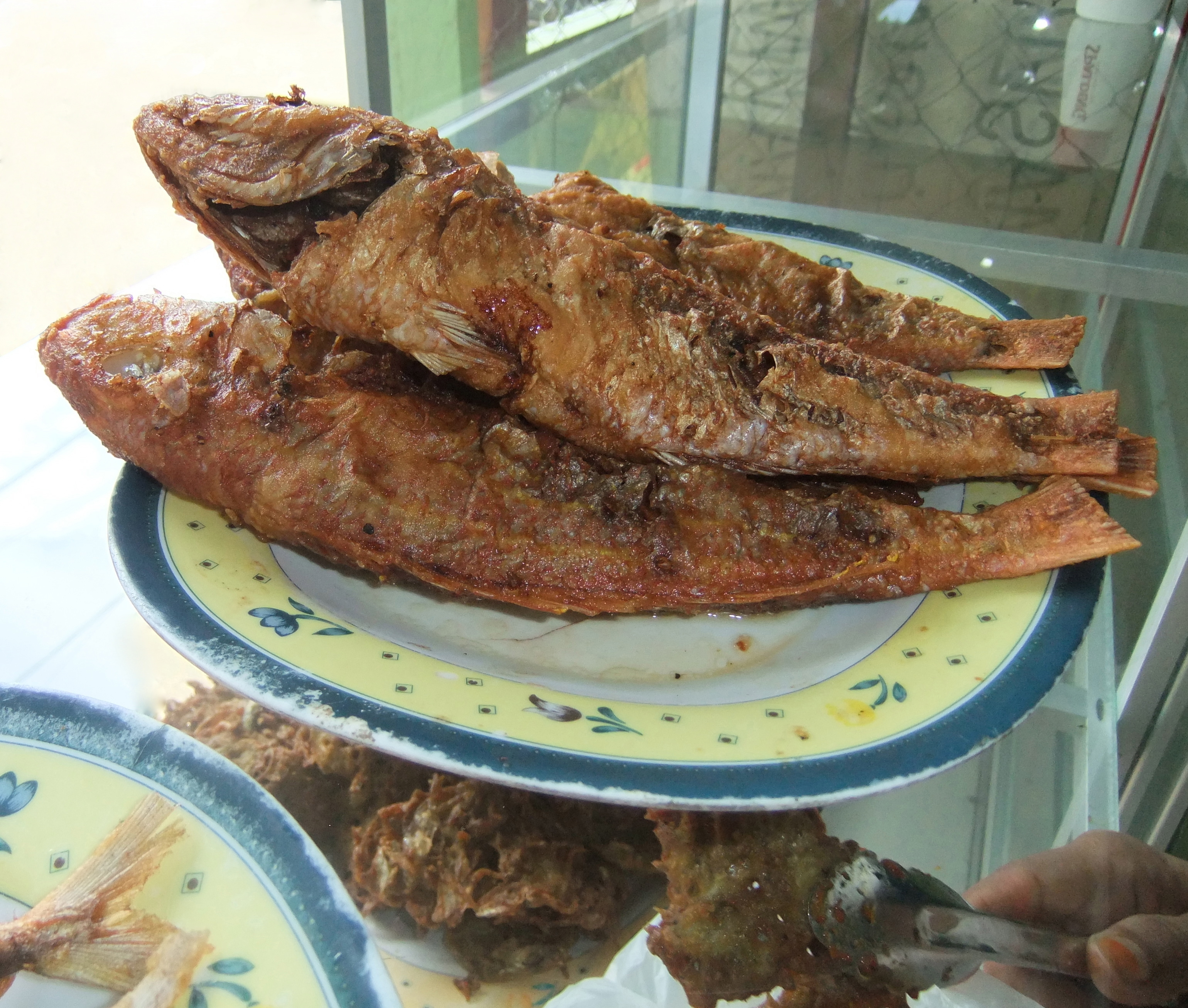
Ikan goreng is a generic term that refers to various kinds of Indonesian and Malaysian dishes of deep fried fish or other forms of seafood.

- Ikan bakar – Indonesian and Malay grilled fish
- Ikan goreng – Indonesian and Malaysian fried fish
- Inun-unan – Filipino cooking process

==== J ====
- Janssons frestelse – Swedish potato casserole

==== K ====
- Kaeng som – Fish curry dish
- Kakavia – Fish soup from Greece
- Kalakukko – Finnish savoury pie
- Kedgeree – Fish and rice-based dish
- Kibbeling – Dutch seafood snack, consisting of chunks of deep-fried cod
- Kinilaw – Filipino seafood dish
- Kokotxas – Fish delicacy
- Kuai – Chinese food dish

==== L ====
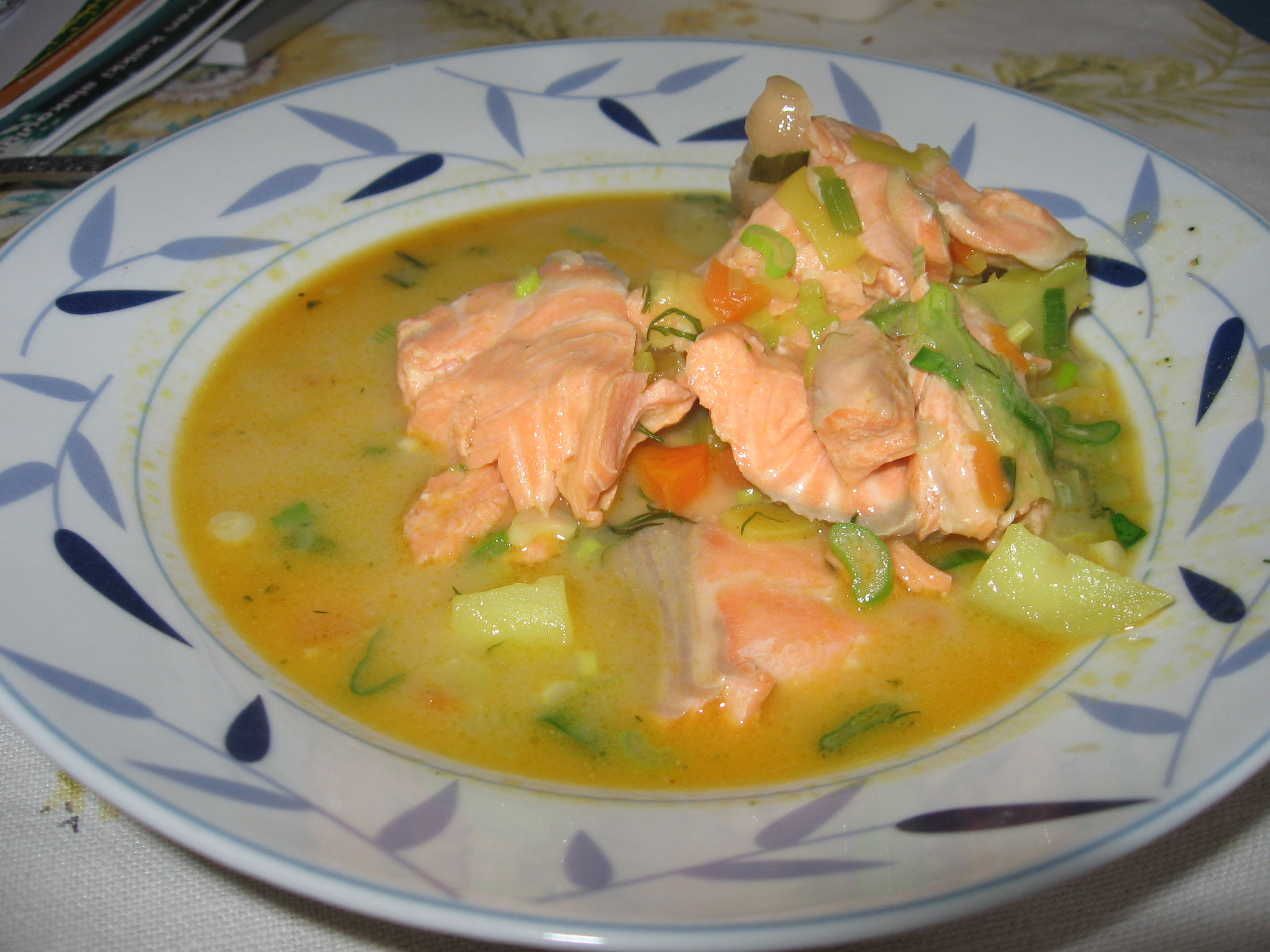
Lohikeitto is a common dish in Finland and other Nordic countries that consists of salmon fillets, boiled potatoes and leeks.

- Laulau – Traditional Polynesian dish of cooked taro leaves and stems
- Lavangi (food) – Azerbaijani dish
- Linagpang – Filipino cooking process
- Linarang – Filipino cuisine
- Lohikeitto – Nordic salmon and potato dish with carrots and leeks
- Loimulohi – Finnish fish dish
- Lumpiang isda – Chinese Indonesian and Filipino spring roll
- Lutefisk – Nordic dried fish dish

==== M ====
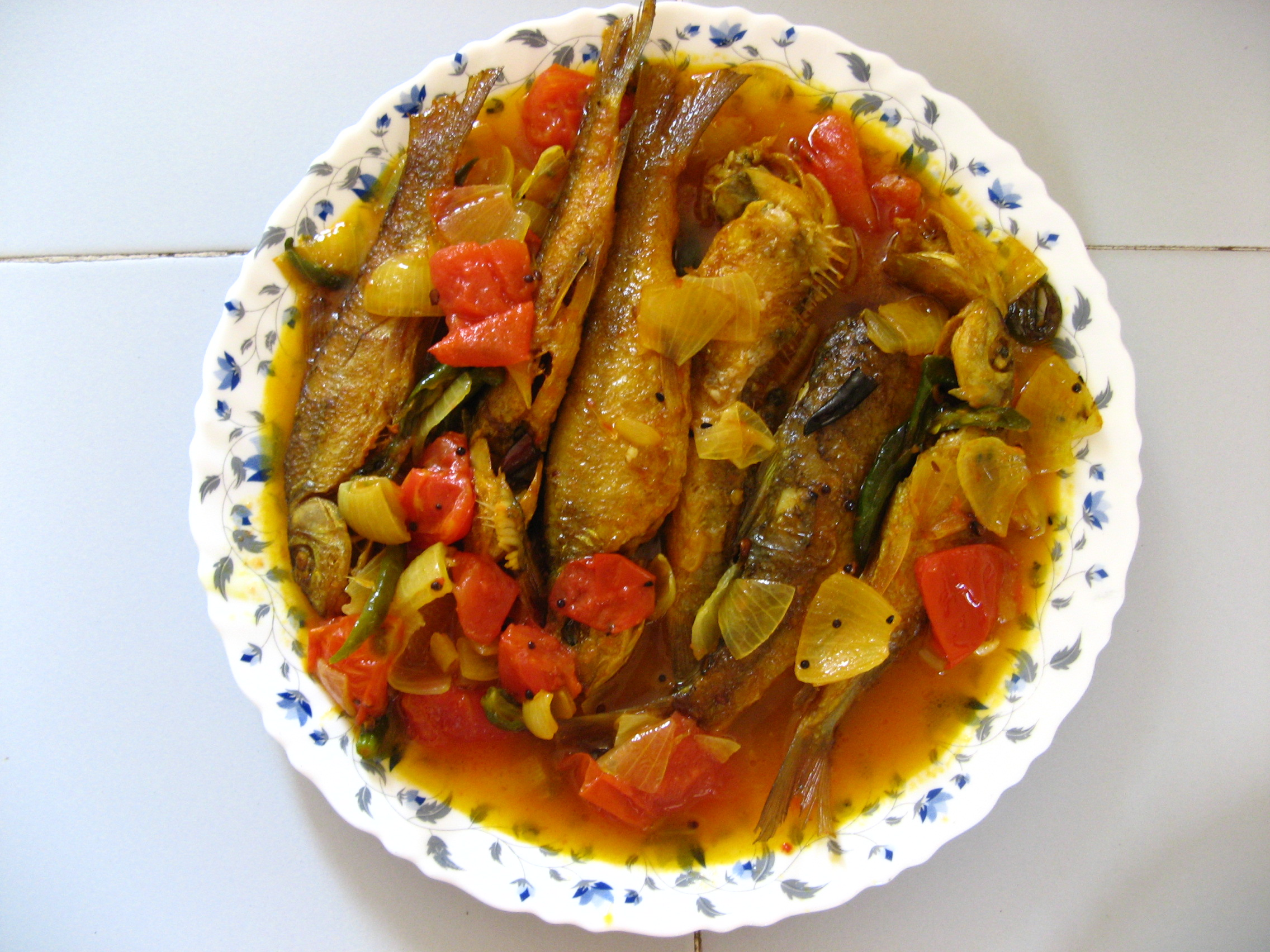
Machher jhol in an Odia style is a traditional Bengali and Odia spicy fish stew.

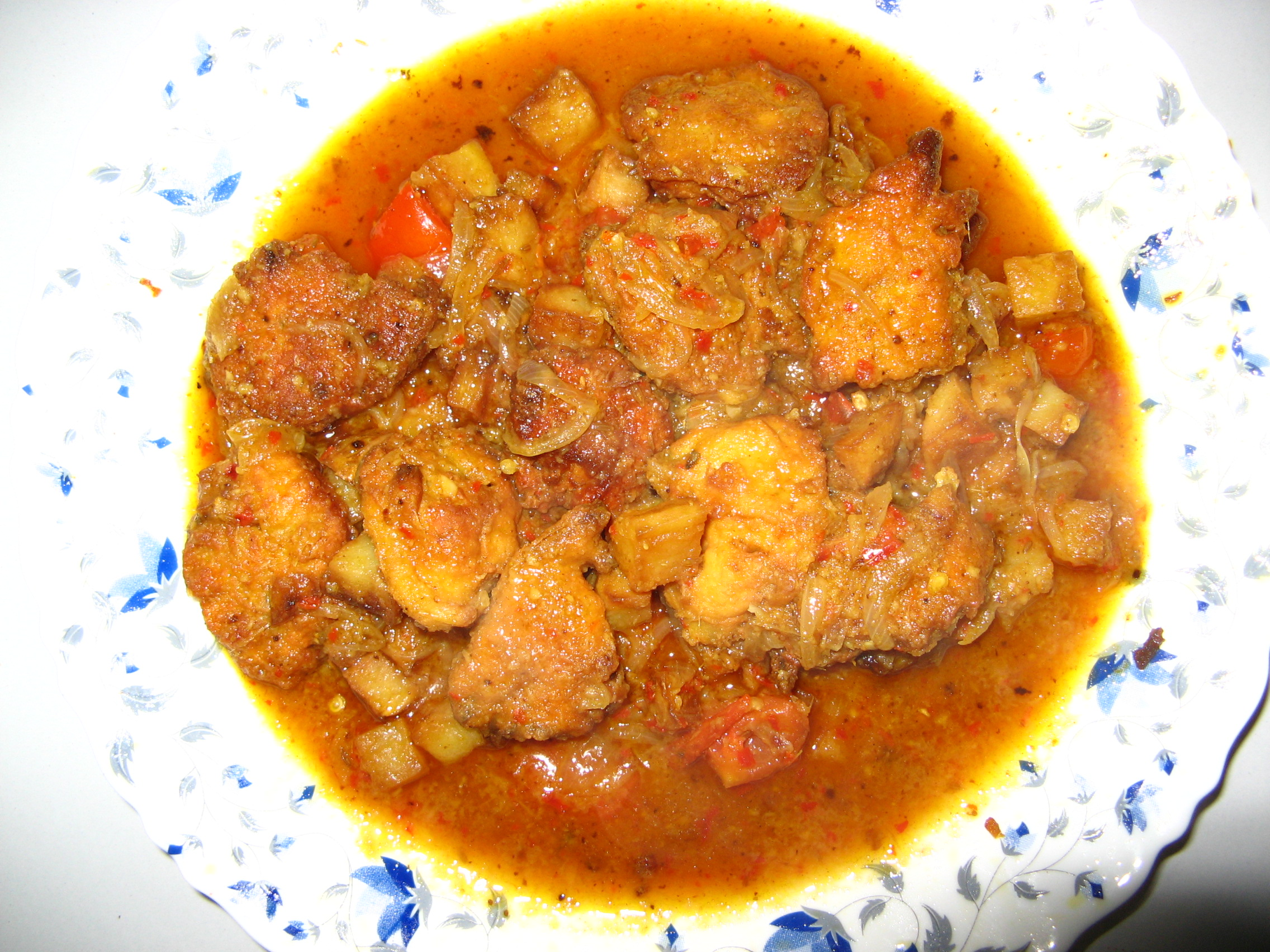
Maachha Bihana is fish egg curry in an oriya style.

- Machh bhaja – Machh baja is a crispy, spice-marinated deep-fried fish dish
- Machher Jhol – Fish curry in Bengali cuisine
- Maeuntang – Korean spicy fish soup
- Malabar matthi curry – Indian dish
- Mangalorean Bangude Masala
- Margi special – Nigerian cuisine
- Masgouf – Iraqi national dish
- Milkfish congee – Taiwanese congee
- Mohinga – Burmese noodle soup of rice noodles and fish
- Moqueca – Brazilian seafood stew

==== N ====
- Nanbanzuke – Japanese fish dish

==== O ====
- Odorigui – Consumption of live, moving seafood in Japanese cuisine
- Otak-otak – Indonesian traditional fish cake

==== P ====
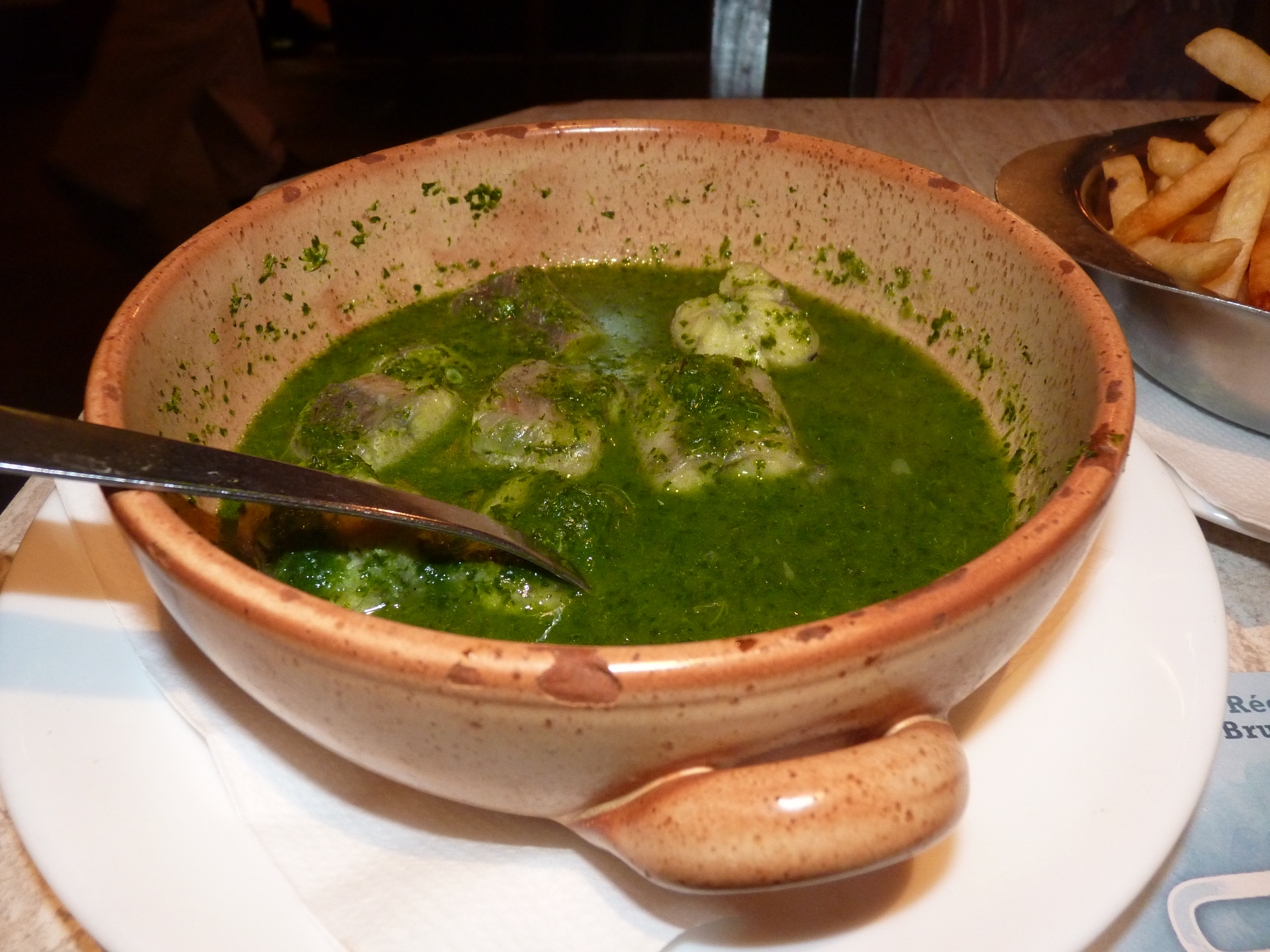
Paling in 't groen is a Flemish regional dish, mainly from the area along the River Scheldt between Dendermonde and Antwerp. The Dutch language name (literally 'eel in the green') refers to freshwater eel in a green herb sauce.

- Paksiw na isda – Filipino cooking process

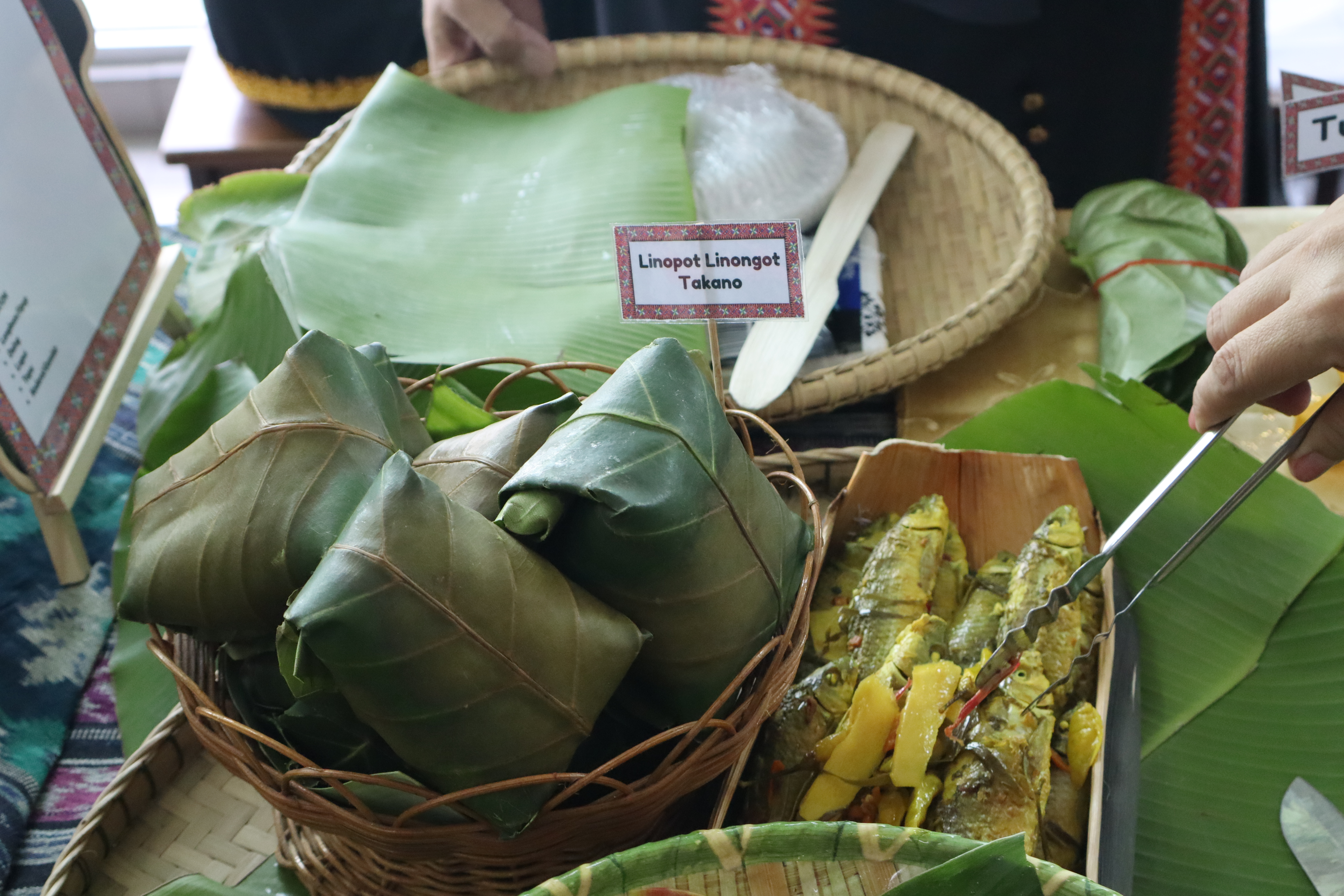
Pinaasakan sada (right), traditional simmered fish of the Kadazan-Dusun in Sabah, Malaysia with takob akob (Garcinia parvifolia)

- Paling in 't groen – Belgian dish
- Panta bhat – Rice-based dish originating in Bengal
- Paprykarz szczeciński – Polish canned fish spread
- Pastéis de Bacalhau – Traditional Portuguese codfish dish
- Pastilla – North African pie made from meat and layered pastry dough
- Patra ni machhi – Indian dish
- Pempek – Indonesian dish made of fish and tapioca
- Pepes – Indonesian traditional banana leaf dish
- Piaparan – Filipino dish
- Pickled herring – Traditional way of preserving herring
- Pinaasakan sada – Traditional simmered fish of Sabah, Malaysia
- Pinangat na isda – Filipino dish from Southern Luzon
- Pindang – Indonesian cooking method
- Pira caldo – Paraguayan fish soup
- Poke – Hawaiian raw fish dish
- Pompano en Papillote – Food baked in a parchment paper or foil pouch
- Portuguese asado
- Psarosoupa – Greek word for a fish soup traditional to Greek cuisine
- Pudpod – Fish dish eaten by the Waray people

==== Q ====
- Quenelle – Mixture of creamed fish or meat with a light egg binding, formed into an egg-like shape

==== R ====
- Rakfisk – Norwegian fermented fish dish made from trout or char
- Rollmops – Pickled herring fillets
- Run down – Stew dish

==== S ====
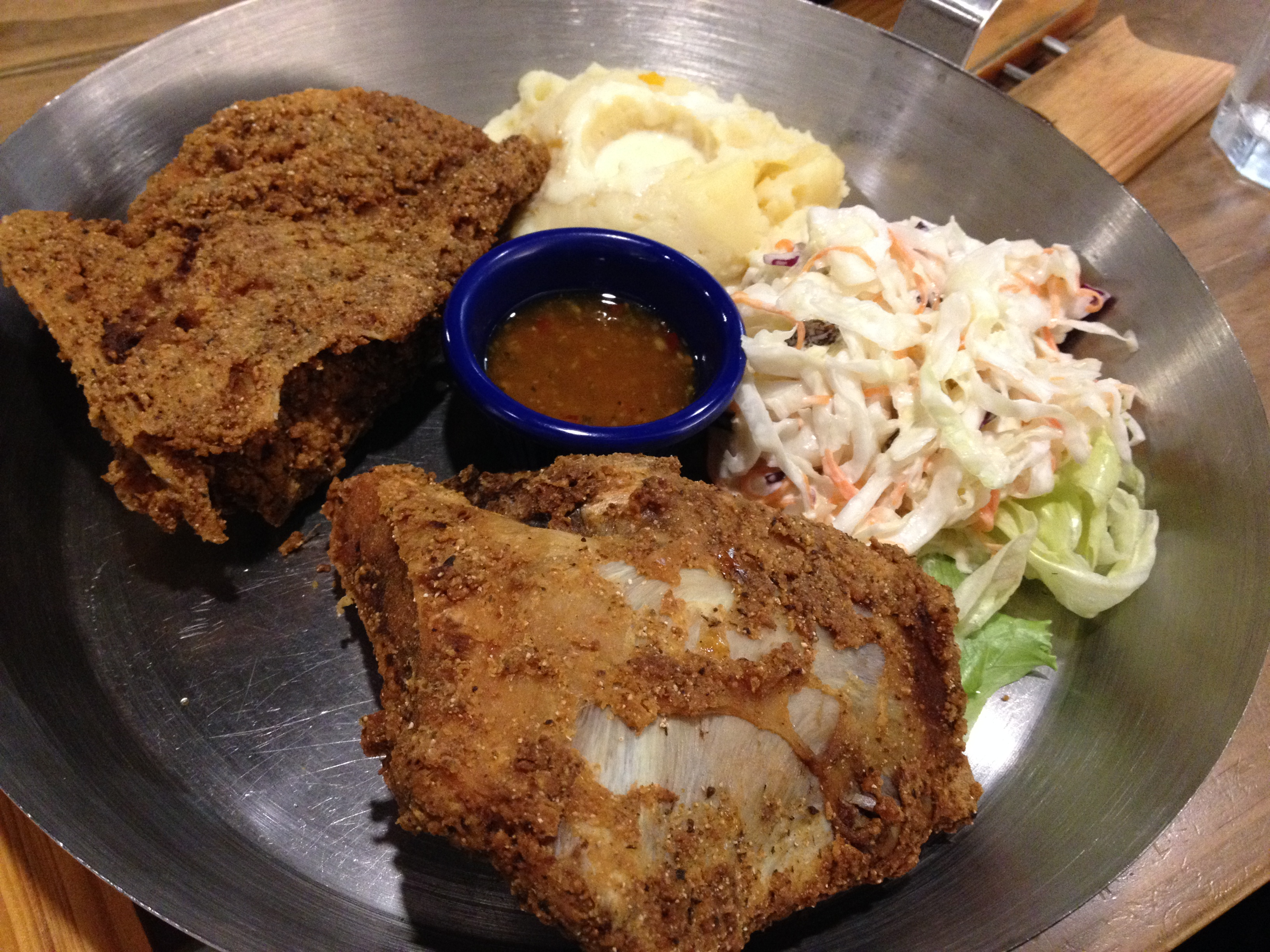
Deep-fried swordfish collar with chips and coleslaw

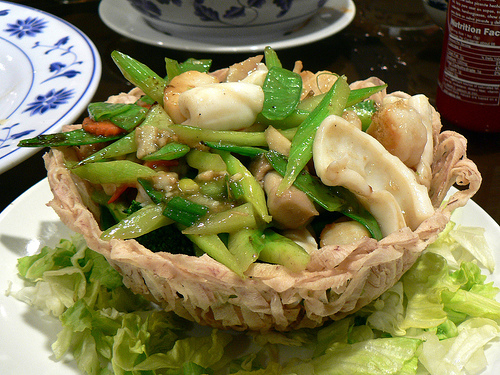
Seafood birdsnest is a common Chinese cuisine dish found in Hong Kong, China and most overseas Chinatown restaurants.

- Salad Niçoise – French salad with anchovies or tuna
- Sabzi polo – Iranian rice and herb dish
- Sambal stingray – Seafood dish
- Saramură
- Sarsiado – Filipino fish dish with tomatoes and eggs
- Sata – Malaysian dish
- Sate Bandeng – Indonesian grilled milkfish dish
- Sayadieh – Fish and rice dish from Egypt
- Scapece alla vastese – Italian dish
- Seafood birdsnest – Chinese cuisine dish
- Shark chutney – Seychellois dish
- Sinanglay – Filipino dish
- Sinigang na isda – Filipino sour soup
- Sliced fish soup – Singaporean soup
- Sole meunière – French fish dish
- Sorshe Ilish – Bengali fish dish
- Stamp and Go – Jamaican fritter
- Stargazy pie – Cornish dish made of baked fish
- Steckerlfisch – Fish grilled on a stick
- Stroganina – Siberian dish of sliced raw fish
- Sungeoguk – Korean soup dish
- Sushi – Japanese dish with vinegared rice

==== T ====
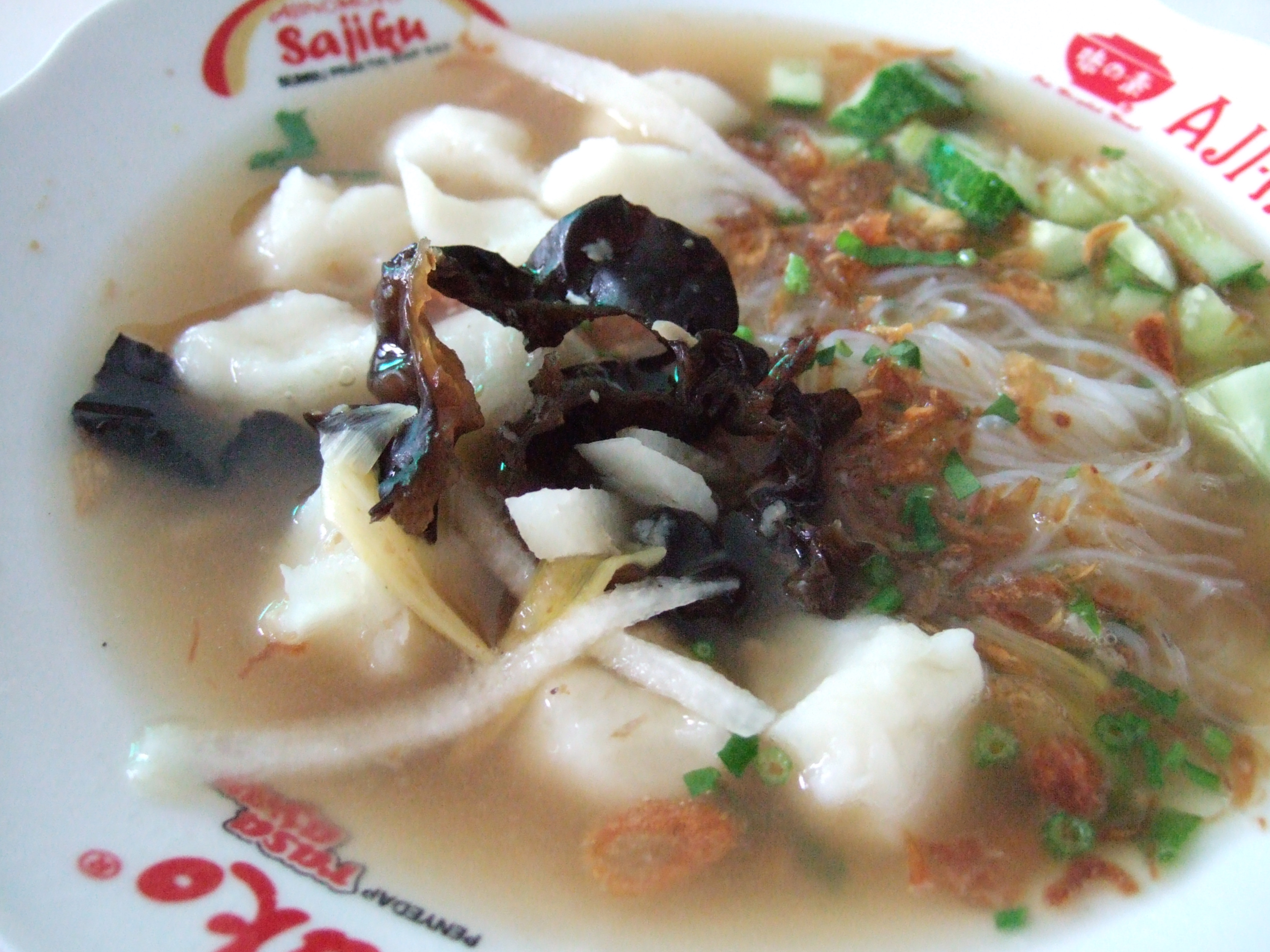
Tekwan is a fish soup of Palembang, Indonesia, prepared with fishcake.

- Tekwan – Indonesian fish soup dish
- Thieboudienne – Traditional dish from Senegal
- Tinapa – Filipino smoked fish
- Tiradito – Peruvian dish of raw fish
- Topote – Local dish of Veracruz, Mexico
- Tsukune – Japanese chicken meatball
- Tom yam – Thai soup
- Tuna casserole – American casserole dish
- Tuna melt – Type of hot sandwich containing cheese
- Tuna salad – Fish salad with mayonnaise sauce
- Tuna sandwich – Type of sandwich

==== U ====
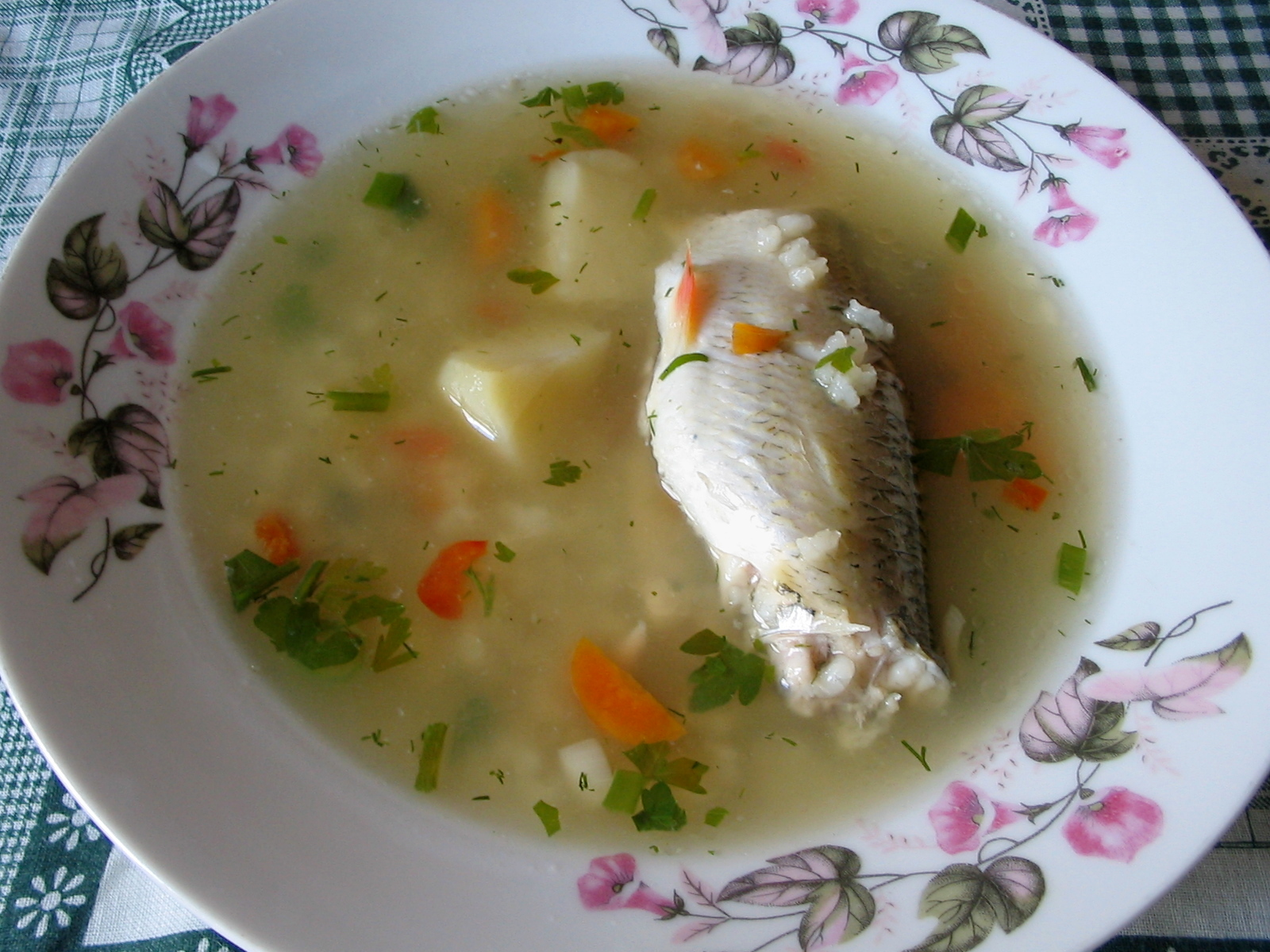
Ukha is a clear Russian soup, made from various types of fish such as bream, wels catfish, or ruffe.

- Ukha – Russian soup made of fish

==== W ====
- Waterzooi – Traditional Belgian stew

==== Y ====
- Yassa – Senegalese spicy marinated poultry or fish dish
- Yin Yang fish – Taiwanese fish dish

=== List by ingredient ===
==== Salmon dishes ====
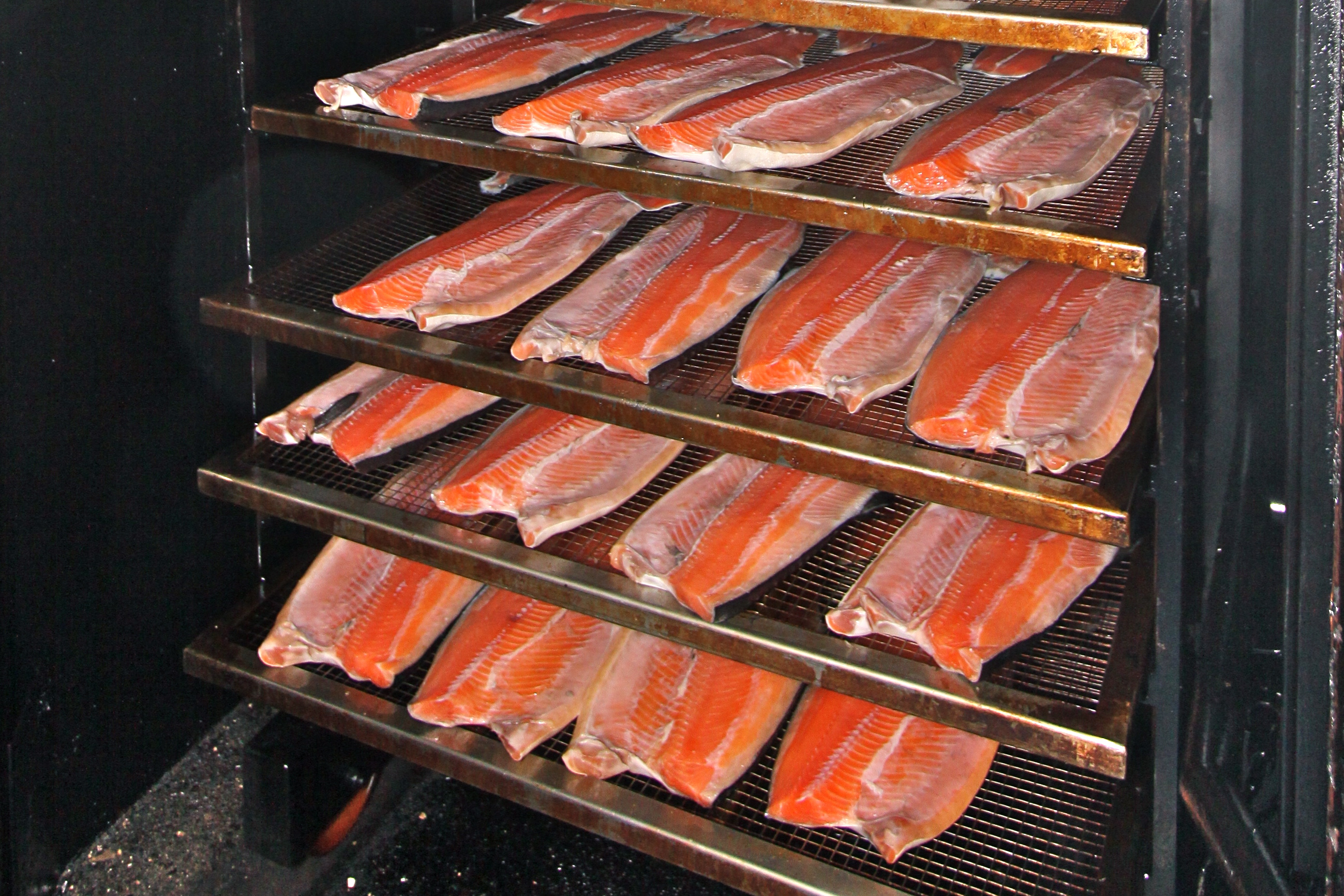
Halved smoked salmon in a salmon smokehouse

- B.C. roll – Sushi containing barbecued salmon and cucumber
- Cured salmon – Fish subjected to fermentation, pickling or smoking
- Gravlax – Nordic dish consisting of raw salmon cured in salt, sugar, and dill
- Lomi salmon – Hawaiian tomato and salmon salad
- Lox – Brined salmon
- Rui-be – Japanese frozen raw salmon dish
- Salmon burger – Sandwich or burger made with fish
- Salmon pie – Savoury fish pie
- Scammon – Scrambled eggs and salmon, popularly called "scrambled salmon", named after the town's founder
- Smoked salmon – Preparation of salmon
- Smoked salmon cheesecake – Cheese-based dessert
- Yusheng – Cantonese-style raw fish salad

==== Tuna dishes ====
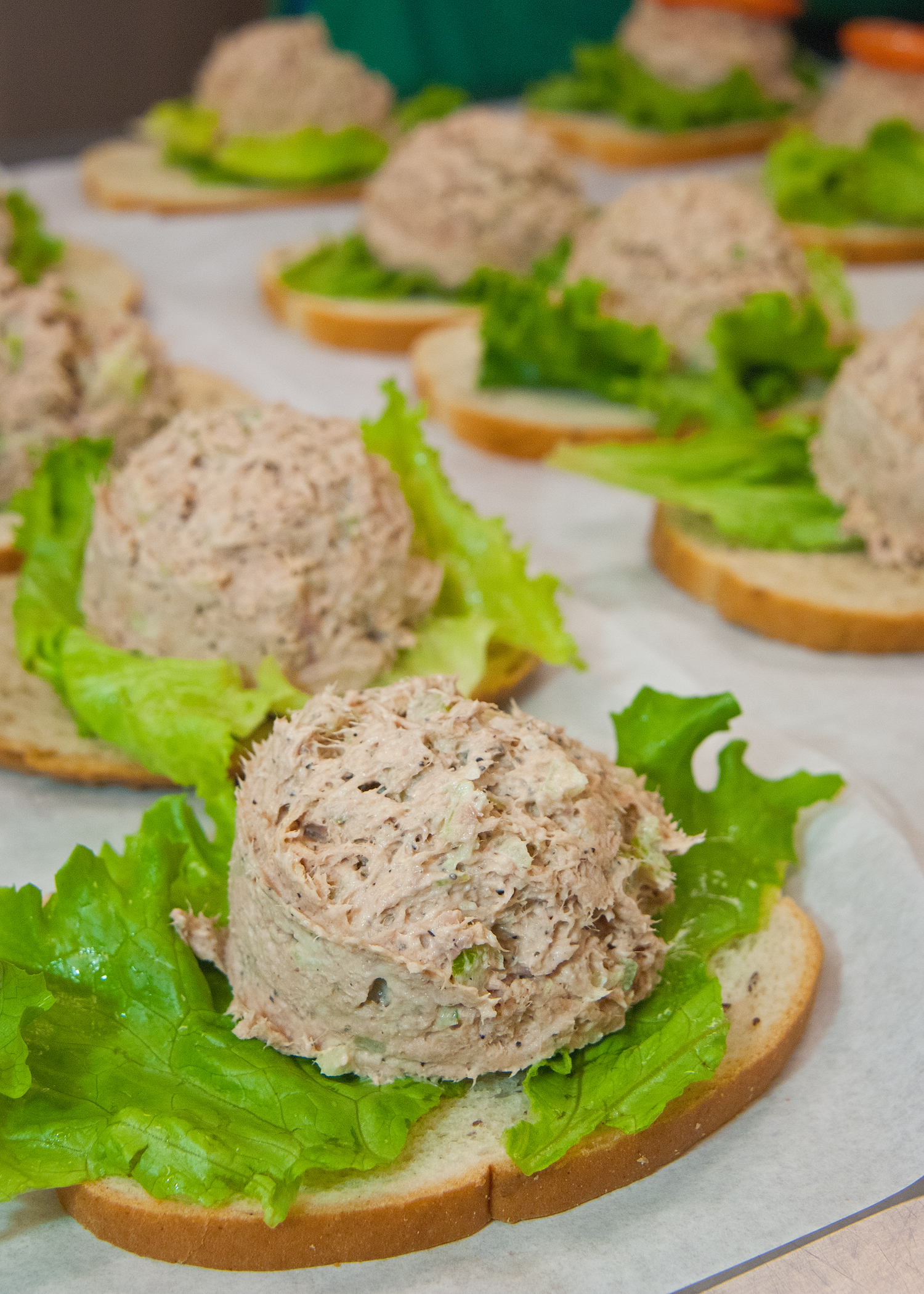
Tuna fish sandwiches

- Cakalang fufu – Indonesian skipjack tuna dish
- Garudiya – Maldivian fish broth
- Gulha – Tuna and coconut dumplings
- Maldives fish – Cured tuna traditionally produced in Maldives
- Mas huni – Maldivian dish
- Mas riha
- Mie cakalang – Indonesian skipjack tuna noodle
- Rihaakuru – Fish-based sauce
- Tekkadon – Japanese rice dish topped with tuna sashimi
- Tuna casserole – American casserole dish
- Tuna fish sandwich – Type of sandwich
- Tuna pot – Fish and potato stew
- Tuna salad – Fish salad with mayonnaise sauce

== Gallery ==
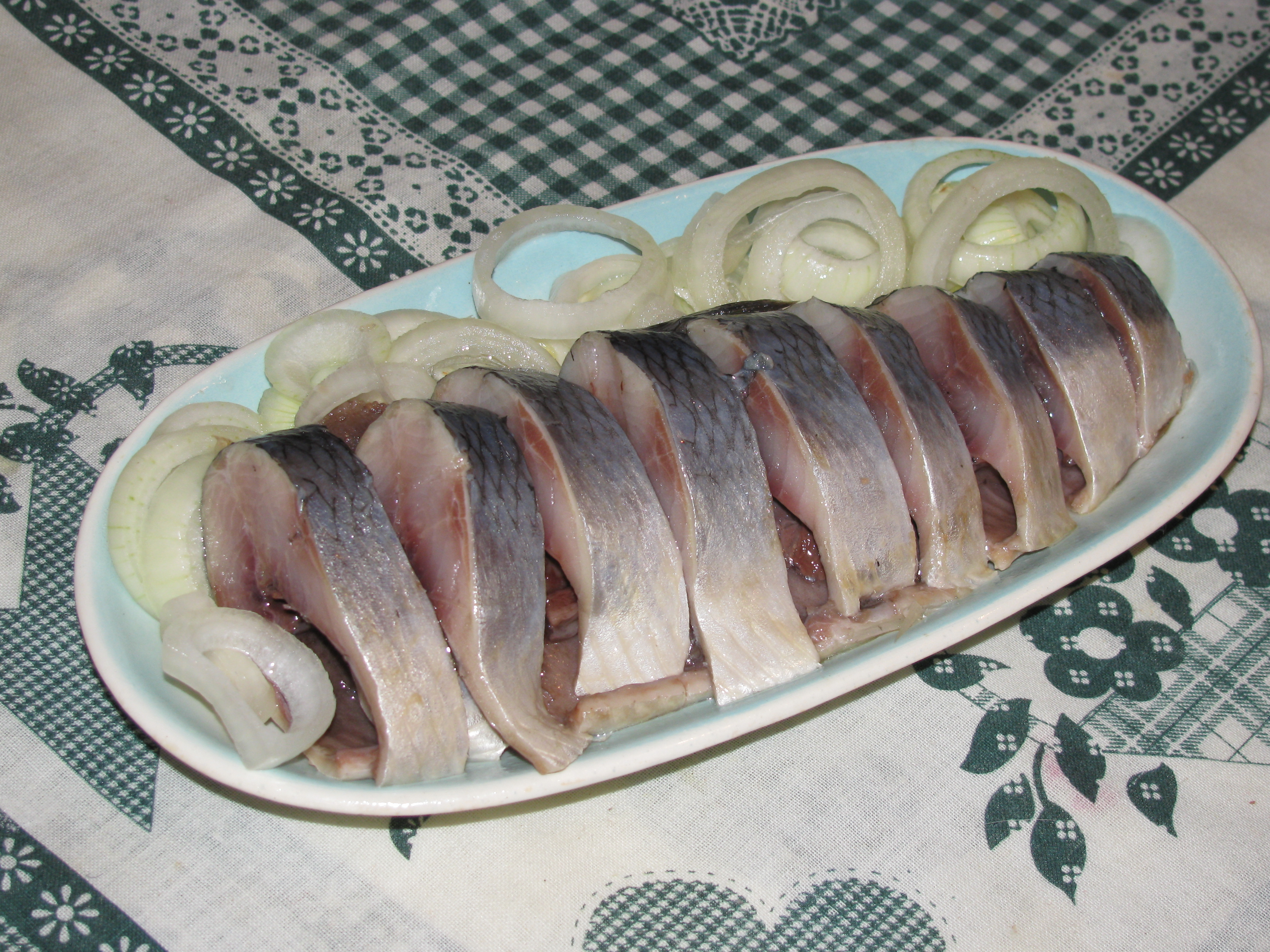
Pickled herring with onions

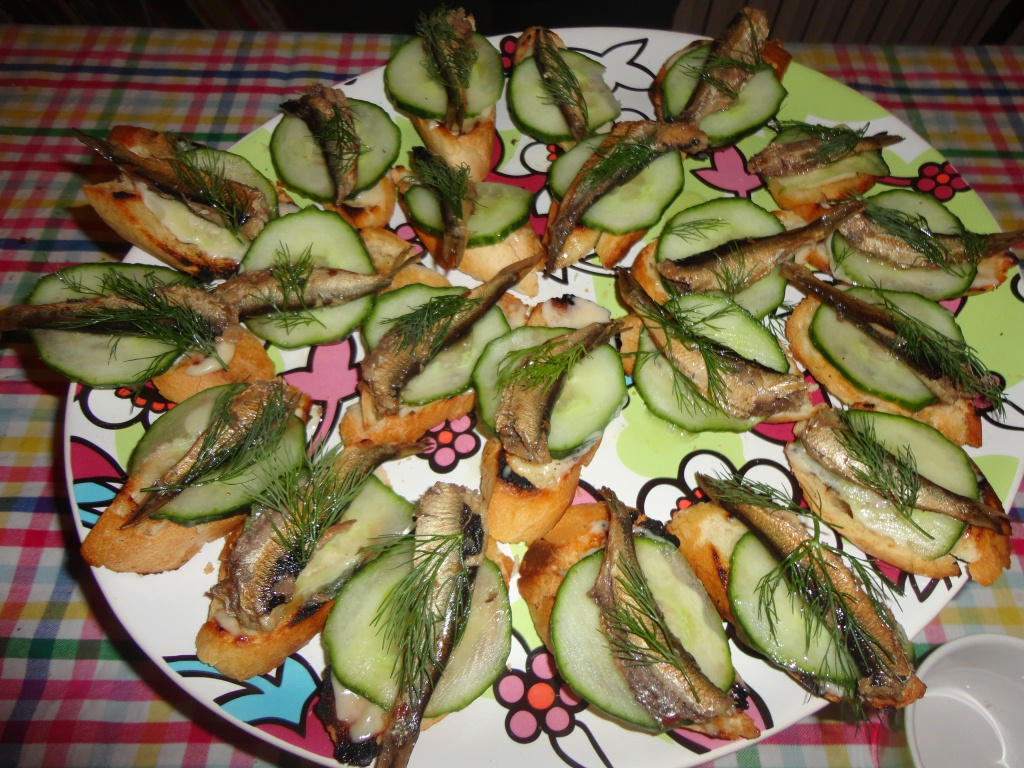
Canapés with smoked sprats, a common Russian zakuska

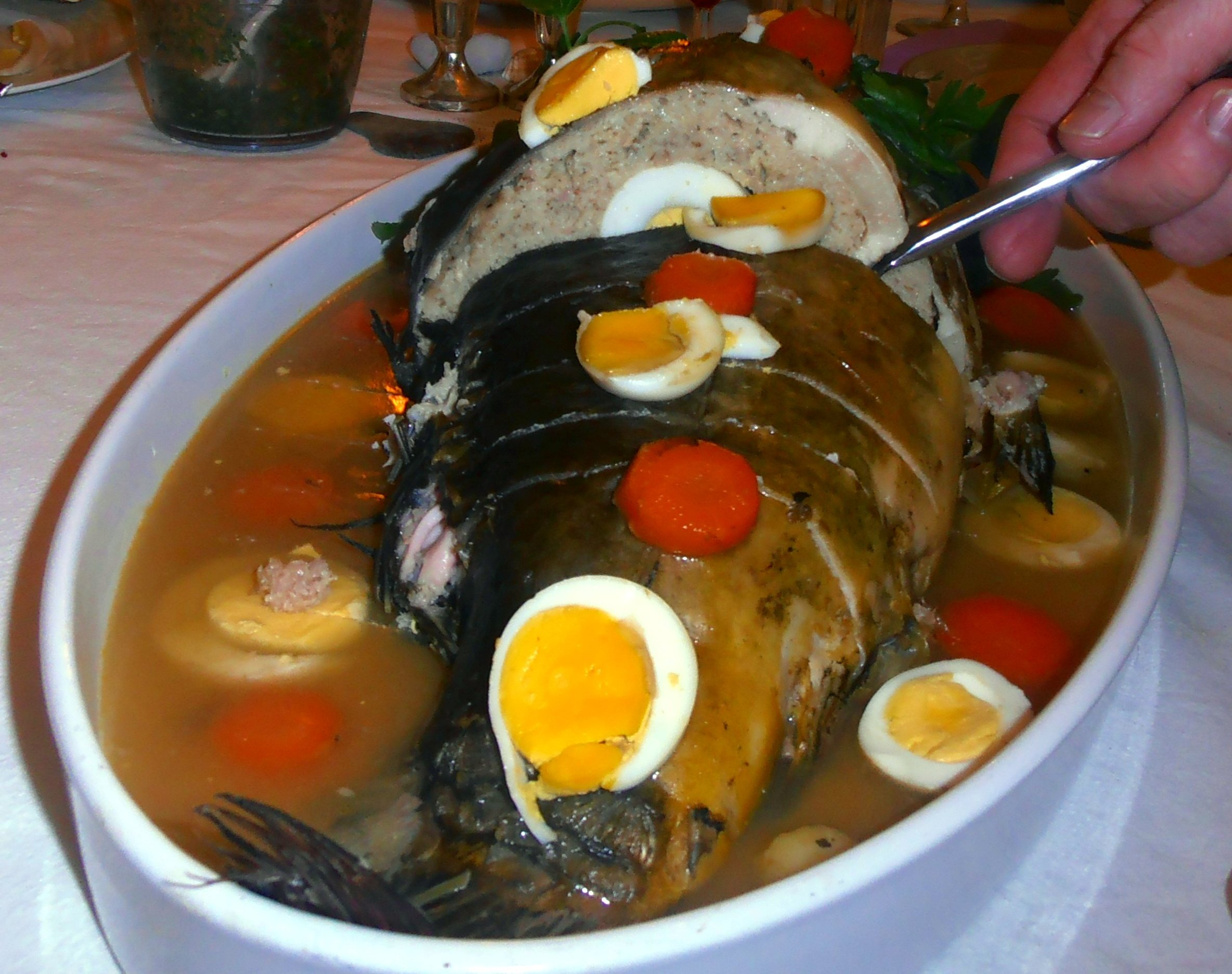
Gefilte fish

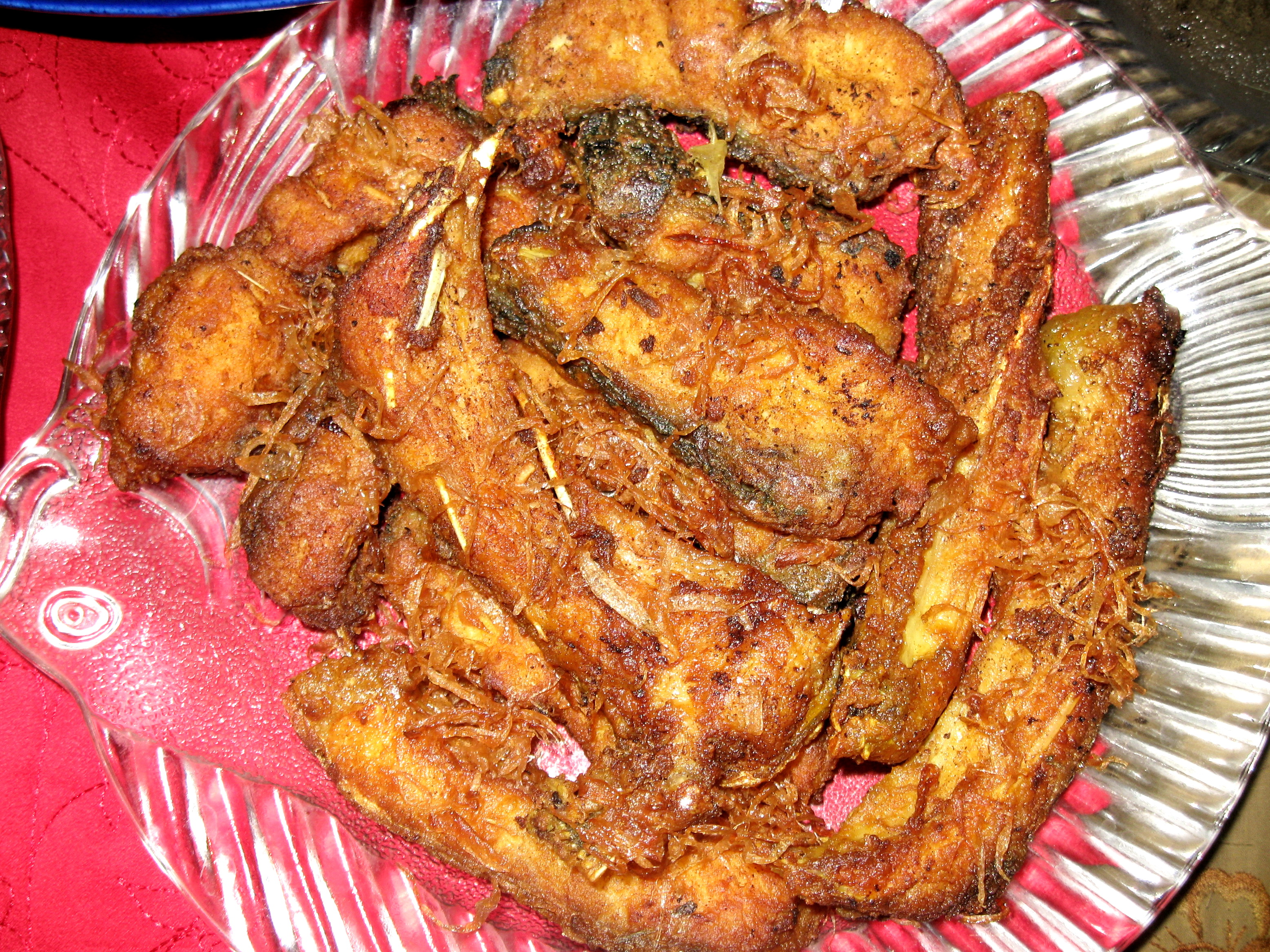
Fried rui served in Dhaka, Bangladesh

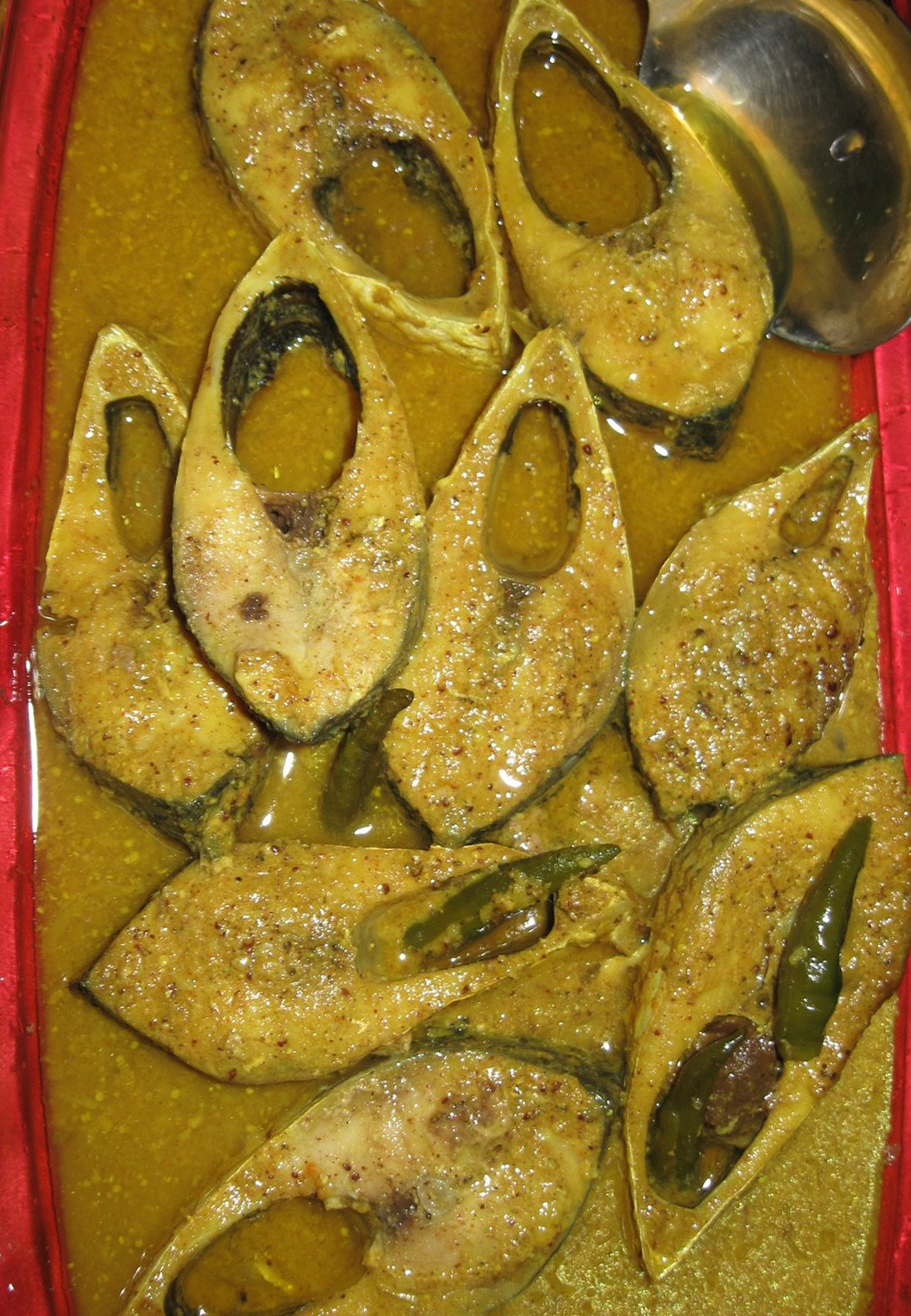
Sorshe Ilish, a dish of smoked ilish with mustard-seed paste, has been an important part of both Bangladeshi and Bengali cuisine.

== See also ==
- List of beef dishes
- List of chicken dishes
- List of fish sauces
- List of lamb dishes
- List of meatball dishes
- List of pork dishes
- List of seafood companies
- List of seafood dishes
- List of seafood restaurants
- Seafood dishes
- List of tuna dishes
