= Patra =

Patra may refer to:

- Patra (singer) (born 1972), female reggae artist
- Patra Sherani, town and union council of Dera Bugti District in Balochistan, Pakistan
- Patra TV, television station in Patras, Greece
- Patras, port city in western Greece
- Pātra, the Sanskrit name for Ōryōki, a nested set of bowls and eating utensils used by Buddhist monks
- Patra, an ethnic group in Bangladesh and India
- Patra, Sahibganj, a census town in Jharkhand, India
- Colocasia esculenta, a tropical plant
- Patra (film), Indian Tamil film

== See also ==
- Patra ni machhi, Parsi dish made from steamed fish topped with chutney and wrapped in a banana leaf
- Patrode, vegetarian dish from Gujarat, India made from colocasia leave stuffed with rice flour
- Prem Patra, 1962 Indian Bollywood film produced and directed by Bimal Roy
- Strir Patra, 1972 Bengali film, directed by Purnendu Patri
