= Baccalà alla vicentina =

Traditional dish from Vicenza, Italy

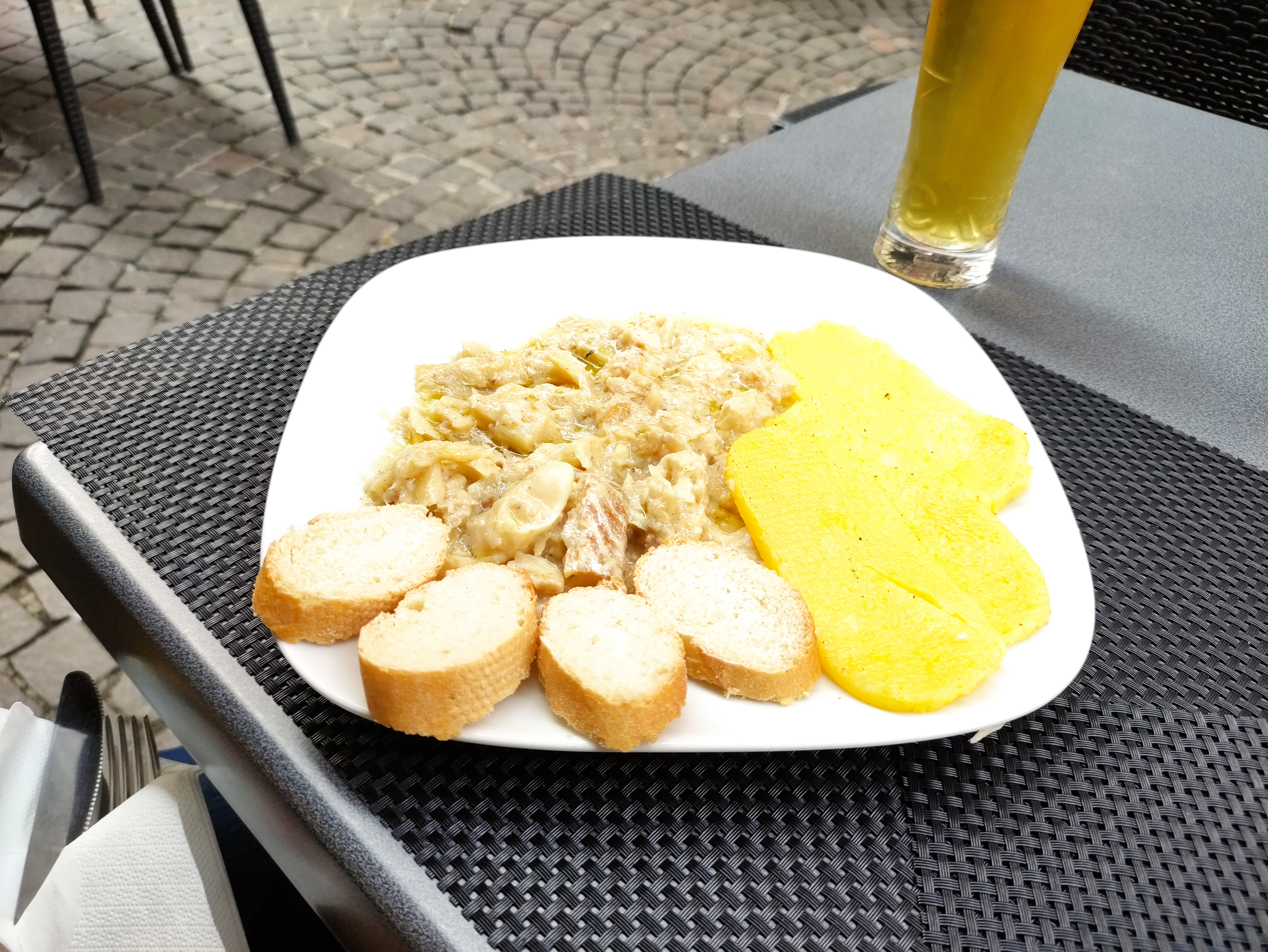
Baccalà alla vicentina

Baccalà alla vicentina (Italian: [bakkaˈla alla vitʃenˈtiːna]; Venetian: bacałà a ła vixentina) is a Venetian dish originating in the city of Vicenza. It is made with stockfish (stoccafisso in Italian), onions, anchovies, milk, and a mature cheese such as Parmesan. Baccalà alla vicentina is considered to be one of the signature dishes of Vicenza.

== See also ==
- Venetian cuisine
- List of fish dishes
