= Sungeo-guk =

Korean soup dish

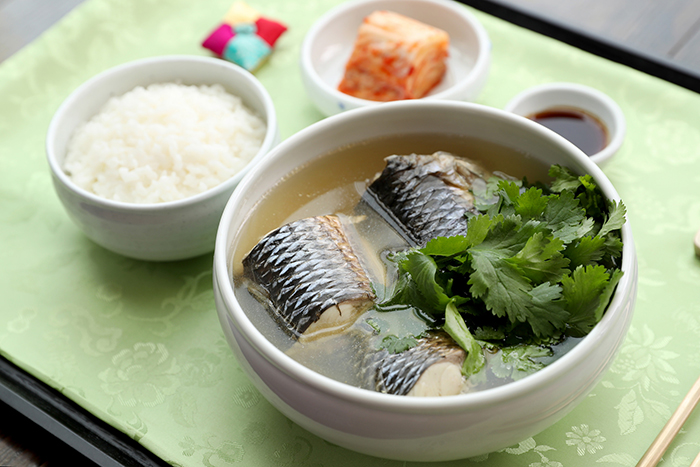
- Taedonggang sungeo-guk
- Type: Guk
- Place of origin: Korea
- Region or state: Pyongyang
- Main ingredients: Flathead grey mullet

Korean name
- Hangul: 숭어국
- RR: sungeoguk
- MR: sungŏguk
- IPA: [suŋ.ʌ.k͈uk]

Sungeo-guk (Korean: 숭어국) is a variety of guk, or Korean soup, made with flathead grey mullet and black pepper. It has a clear broth seasoned with salt, minced garlic, ginger juice, and chopped scallions.

During ancient times, the flathead grey mullet caught in Pyongyang, Chungsan, Anju, Kangso, Ryonggang, Chongju, Kasan, Sunchon, Cholsan and Uiju, which are now in North Korea, were famous for their flavor. Those from the Taedong River, where flathead grey mullet are abundant, were especially renowned.

The soup dish is a representative dish in the cuisine of North Korean capital Pyongyang, where the soup is called Taedonggang sungeoguk, which means "flathead grey mullet soup from the Taedong River". The dish is served as a courtesy for important guests visiting Pyongyang and the question, "How was the flathead grey mullet soup?" is commonly used to greet people returning from Pyongyang.

== Role in Korean cuisine ==
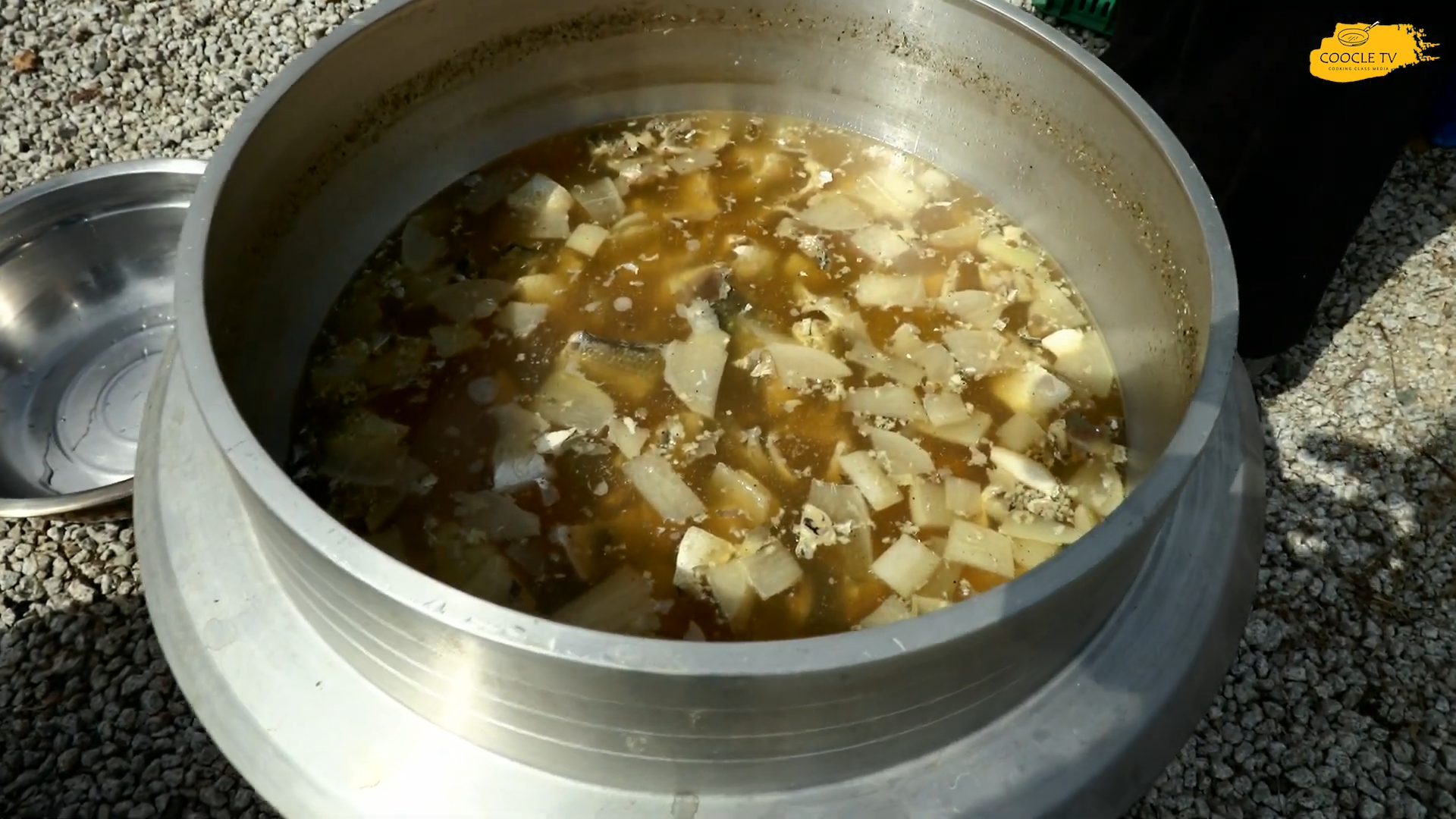
Sungeo-guk in Sot (솥; lit. 'pot')

Flathead grey mullet is mentioned in the Joseon era ichthyology book Jasaneobo (자산어보; 玆山魚譜) as a fish of exceptional taste and nutritional value. Flathead grey mullet is used in various dishes: grilled, steamed, in jjigae, with noodles, as jeon and hoe. Flathead grey mullet dishes such as sungeojjim (steamed flathead grey mullet) are served for special occasions. The taste of flathead grey mullet is slightly different from season to season. Flathead grey mullet caught in spring and winter has a sweet taste, summer flathead grey mullet is tasteless, and autumn flathead grey mullet tastes fatty and savory.

== Preparation ==
The scales, head, internal organs, and fins of a mullet are removed. Once the fish is cleaned, it is chopped into 5 cm pieces. Fillets and peppercorns are put into a pot with boiling water and the foam is skimmed from the broth. As the mullet is cooked, it is seasoned with salt, minced garlic and ginger juice. The soup is served in a bowl garnished with chopped scallions or sometimes with cilantro.

== See also ==
- Maeun-tang, spicy fish soup
- Naengmyeon, cold noodle soup
- Korean regional cuisine
- List of soups
