= Psarosoupa =

Greek word for a fish soup traditional to Greek cuisine

Psarosoupa (Greek: ψαρόσουπα) is the Greek word for a fish soup, traditional to Greek cuisine. There are several variations on the soup. All include fish and vegetables.

The types of fish used vary: carp, cod, hake, mackerel, salmon, skate, trout, turbot, perch, haddock, and swordfish are all possibilities. Some prefer a firm, white-fleshed fish, such as grouper, snapper, or rockfish, and avoid more oily fish.

== Varieties ==
- Bourdeto, fish soup of Ionian islands and western Greece.
- Garoufa, a traditional recipe of Kastoria, which is made with Grivadi fish.
- Psarosoupa Patmou, a variety of Patmos, the smallest of the Dodecanese. It is a simple soup with fish, potatoes, tomatoes, onions, celery, rice, and various spices.
- Psarosoupa me chorta kritiki is the variety of Crete. It is thick, rich, and red in color. Originating in Agios Nikolaos, it features slices of fish along with carrots, celery, tomatoes, zucchini, flour, and various spices and seasonings.
- Psarosoupa avgolemono, a variety with avgolemono (broth with eggs and lemon). It replaces the chicken broth or stock of regular avgolemono soups with fish fumet or court bouillon.

Psarosoupa may be served with retsina.

== See also ==
- Kakavia (soup)
- List of fish dishes
- List of soups
