= Paling in 't groen =

Belgian dish

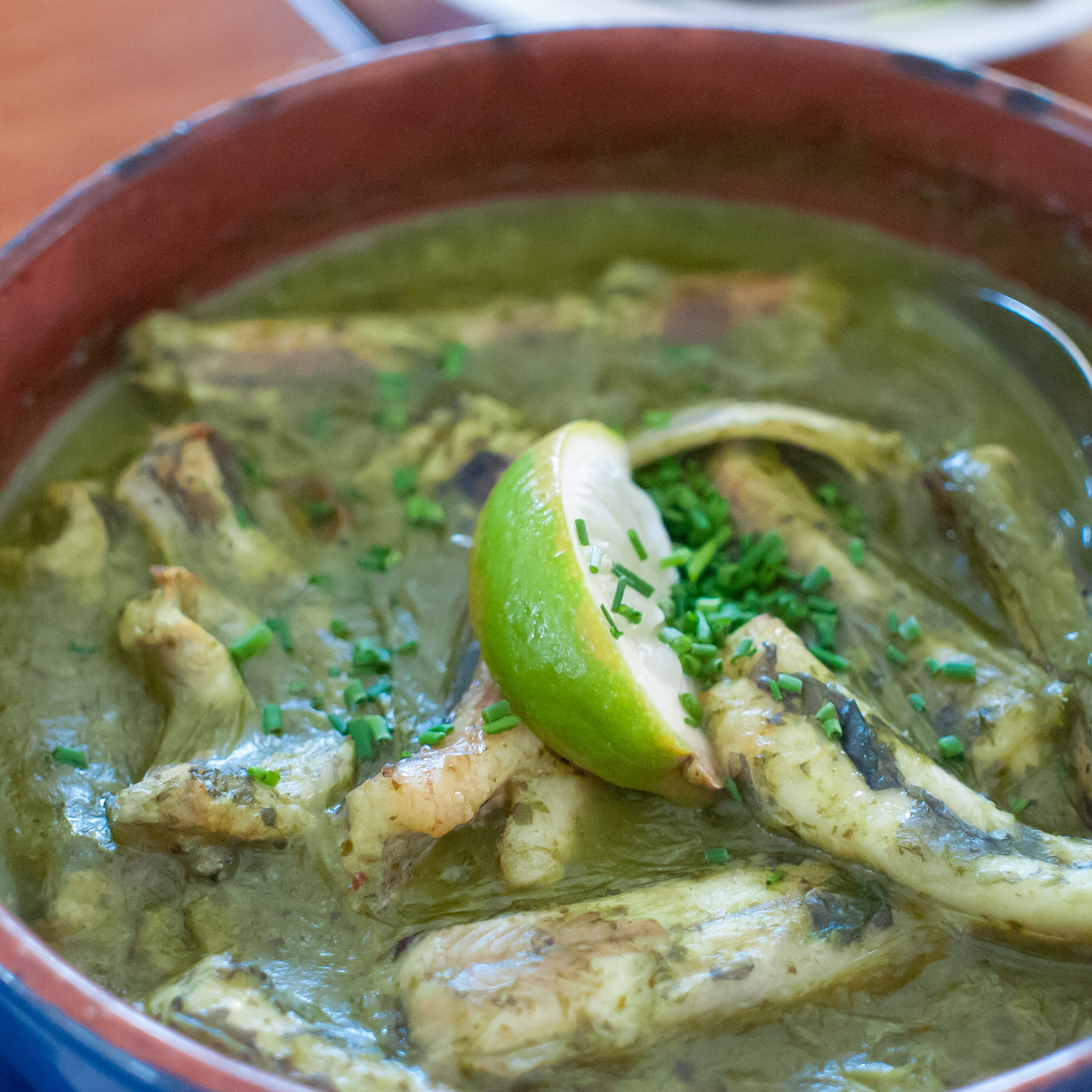
- Alternative names: Anguilles au vert
- Type: Fish
- Place of origin: Belgium
- Main ingredients: eel, various herbs

Paling in 't groen (Dutch) or Anguilles au vert (French) is a Belgian dish, mainly from the Flemish Region along the river Scheldt, between Dendermonde and Antwerp. The Dutch name (literally 'Eel in the Green') refers to freshwater eel in a green herb sauce. The traditionally home-made meal is also sold fully prepared but still uncooked by some fishmongers' shops or market stalls, and can be enjoyed in specialty restaurants.

== Preparation ==
Once the eel has been gutted and its head and skin removed, two inch long cuttings are simmered with a mix of finely chopped fresh herbs. These may typically be a selection of sage, ginger mint, oregano, sorrel, lemon balm (citronella), chervil, thyme, citrus thyme, savory, parsley, stinging nettle, spearmint, burnet, watercress, dragon's-wort (tarragon), chives, and basil. Finely chopped shallot, cornflour, a little butter and salt are added. The stew is done as soon as the white flesh could easily be separated from the bone but still stays on when stirred gently; the amount of starch should allow the sauce on a plate after a minute to be a thickly flowing liquid. According to personal preference, a brighter green colour can be achieved by including spinach, though other aficionados reject this. Variations with beer or wine, lemon juice, egg yolk, or even with chicken broth do occur.

Although occasionally eaten cold, the dish is normally served hot with chips or bread. Consumers may squeeze some lemon over the pieces of eel.

== Eel production ==
The local river eel has become rare or unwanted because of pollution. Since eel farms offer a very fat and gastronomically less desirable product, wild eel is usually imported. It has become a threatened and very expensive species.

== See also ==
- List of fish dishes
