= Baccalà alla lucana =

Christmas dish of cod and red peppers from Basilicata, Italy

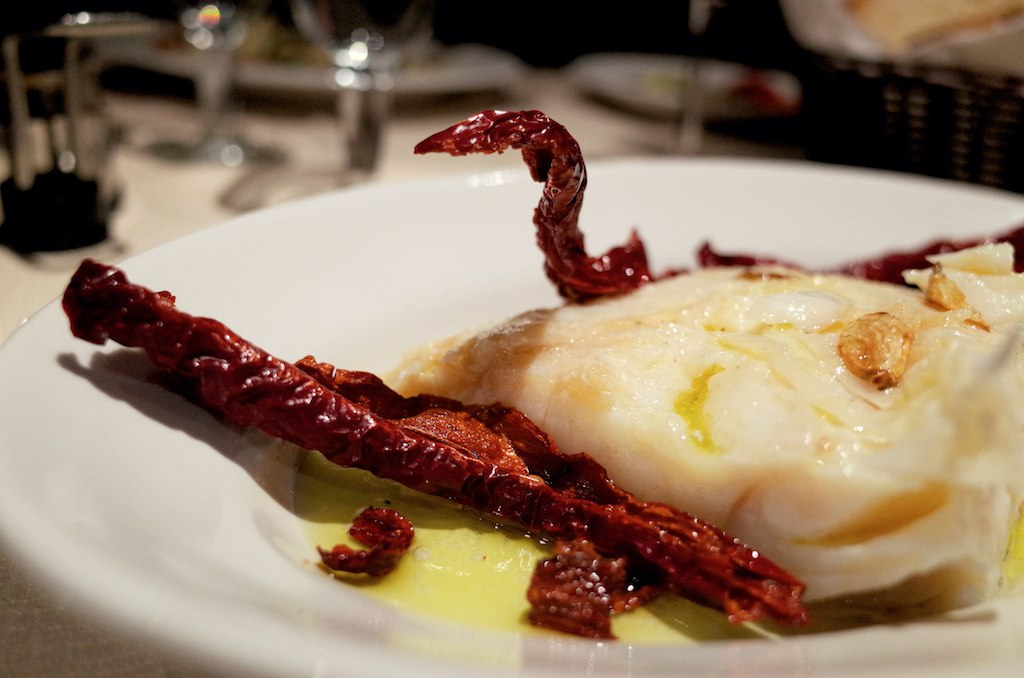
- Course: Secondo (Italian course)
- Place of origin: Italy
- Region or state: Basilicata
- Main ingredients: Cod, peperoni cruschi

Baccalà alla lucana is a traditional Italian cod dish.

== History ==
Baccalà is a fundamental seafood dish for residents of Basilicata, being a hilly area far from the sea. Shelf-stable and easy to transport, it is a preferred alternative to meat-based dishes.

== Preparation ==
Baccalà alla lucana is made with peperoni cruschi, or crispy pepper from Basilicata, and seasoned with oil and parsley. A less popular variant is made with oil- or vinegar-dressed peperoni.

== Popularity ==
On the last weekend of every August, Avigliano hosts a sagra for baccalà alla lucana.

== See also ==
- Cuisine of Basilicata
- List of fish dishes
