= Seafood birdsnest =

Chinese cuisine dish

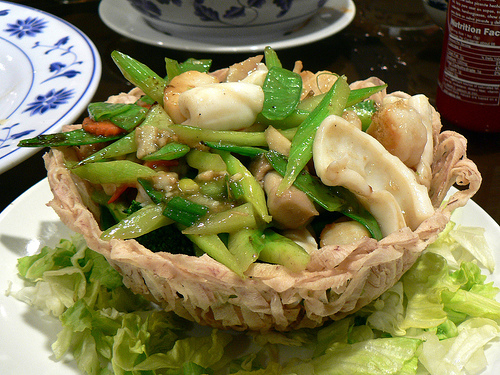
- Place of origin: Hong Kong, China
- Region or state: Cantonese-speaking region
- Main ingredients: fried taro or noodles, scallops, peapods, boneless fish fillet, celery sticks, straw mushrooms, calamari, shrimp

Seafood birdsnest
- Traditional Chinese: 海鮮雀巢
- Simplified Chinese: 海鲜雀巢
- Jyutping: hoi2 sin1 zoek3 caau4
- Hanyu Pinyin: hǎi xiān qiǎo cháo
- Literal meaning: Seafood birds nest
Transcriptions
Standard Mandarin
- Hanyu Pinyin: hǎi xiān qiǎo cháo
Yue: Cantonese
- Jyutping: hoi2 sin1 zoek3 caau4

Seafood birdsnest is a common Chinese cuisine dish found in Hong Kong, China and most overseas Chinatown restaurants. It is also found within Cantonese cuisine. It is usually classified as a mid- to high-end dish depending on the seafood offered.

The edible nest holding the seafood is made entirely out of fried taro or noodles. There are different intricate netting used in the nest making. The fried nest is usually tough and crunchy.

Despite the name there is nothing bird-related in this dish. The most common ingredients are scallops, peapods, boneless fish fillet, celery sticks, straw mushrooms, calamari, shrimp.

== See also ==
- List of fish dishes
- List of seafood dishes
