= Maachha bihana =

Indian curry dish with fish roe

Maachha Bihana
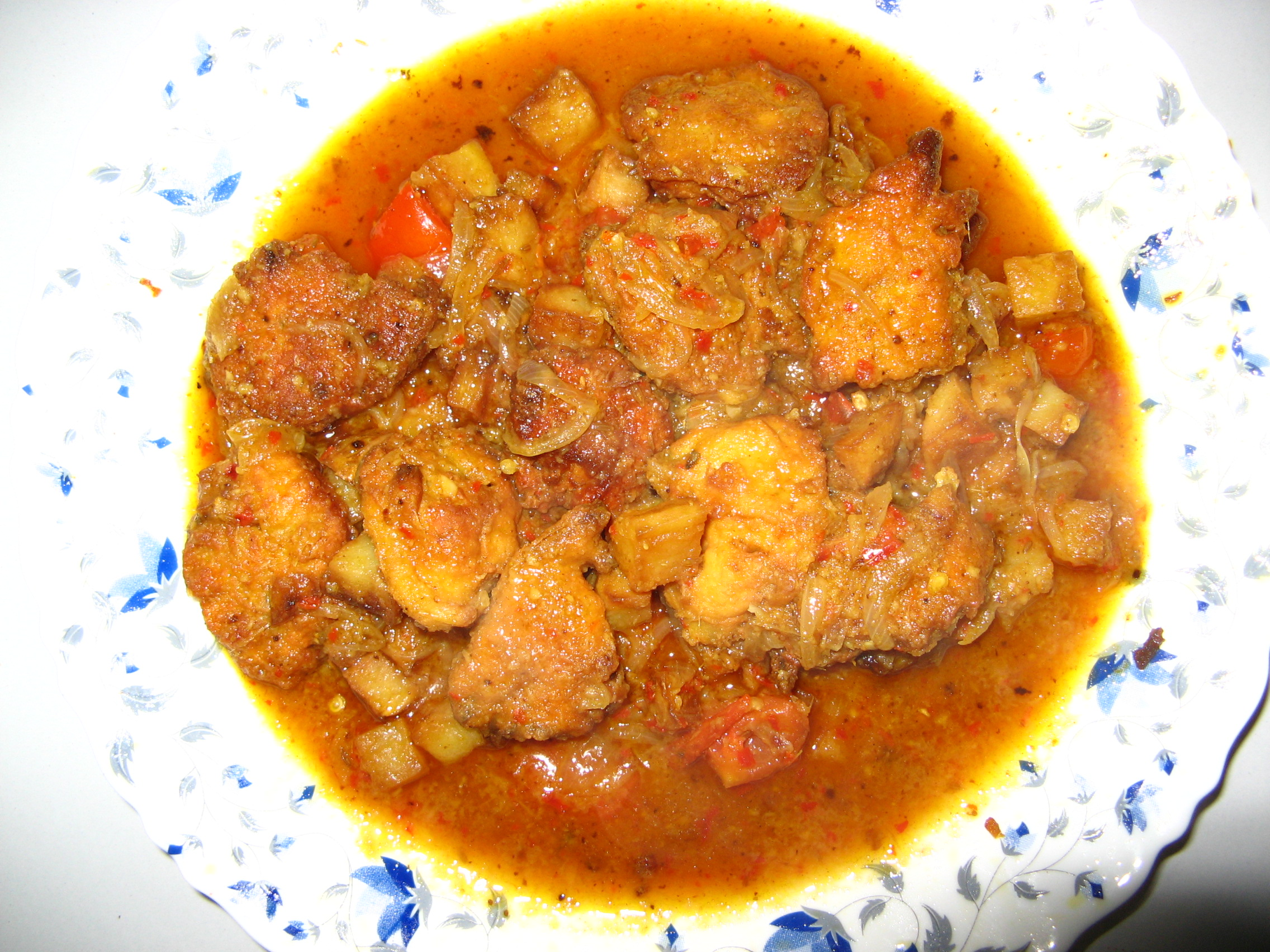
- Fish egg curry in Odia cuisine style
- Type: Curry
- Place of origin: India
- Region or state: Odisha
- Main ingredients: Fish roe, gram dal, spices

Maachha Bihana (Odia: ମାଛ ଭିହାଣ) refers to the fish roe (eggs) that are seasoned, shaped into dumplings, and cooked in a spicy curry. The dish is a traditional delicacy from coastal Odisha, India, and is particularly popular during the monsoon season when fresh fish and roe are abundant.

== Preparation ==
The preparation of Maachha Bihana begins with collecting the roe from freshly sliced fish.

A paste made from black gram (urad dal), spices, and sometimes rice flour is mixed with the roe to form small dumplings or fritters. These are deep-fried until golden brown and then simmered in a spicy, tangy curry made with onion, garlic, and mustard-based masala.

The dish is often served with steamed rice and is known for its rich, earthy flavour and distinct texture from the fish eggs.

A popular variant is Ilishi Maachha Bihana, made from the roe of the hilsa fish (Tenualosa ilisha), which is considered a delicacy across eastern India and Bangladesh.

== Cultural Significance ==
Maachha Bihana holds a special place in the culinary traditions of Odisha, especially in fishing communities along the coast.

The dish is commonly prepared during the monsoon months, a period associated with fishing festivals and rituals in the region.The ova are collected from the sliced fish and a paste of black gram dal and spices are applied to make small balls. These balls are fried and made to a gravy based curry. Most popular is the Ilishi Maachha Bihana.

== History ==
Environmentalists and fishery experts have expressed concern over the decline in certain fish species, partly due to overfishing during the breeding season when roe are collected.

Awareness campaigns and sustainable fishing initiatives have been introduced to encourage responsible harvesting practices and restoration of fish populations.
