= Topote =

Local dish of Veracruz, Mexico

Topotes are a local dish of Catemaco, Veracruz, Mexico made from threadfin shad (Dorosoma petenense).

They are deep fried whole just until almost burned, and served with onion, lime, salt, and corn tortillas.
