= Fish pulimunchi =

Mangalorean fish-based dish

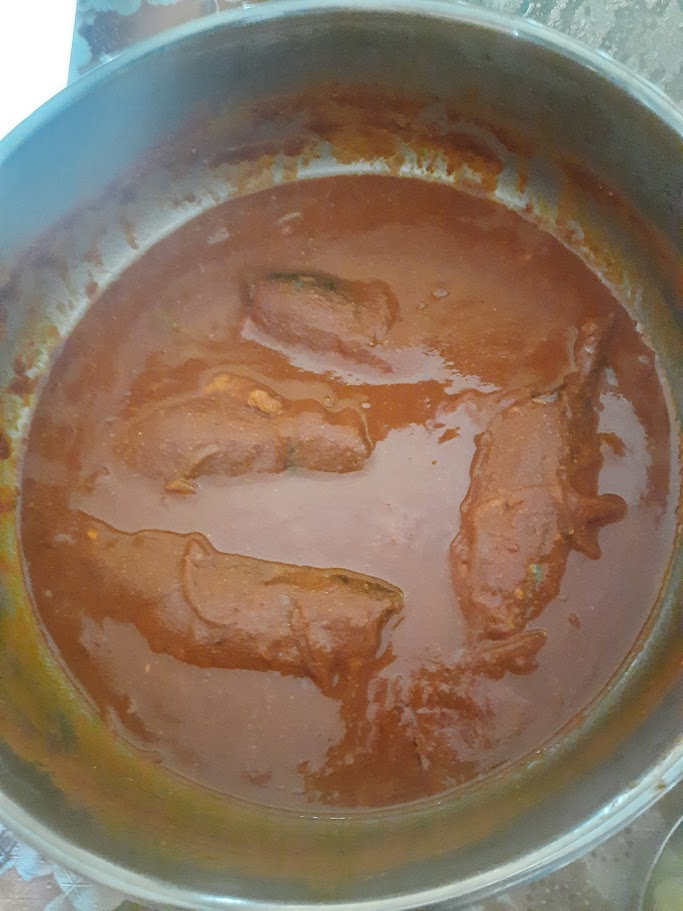
Bhutai Pulimunchi which is made using Sardines

Fish Pulimunchi is a Mangalorean fish based dish of coastal Karnataka in southwest India. The dish uses tamarind, a distinctive ingredient in traditional Mangalorean cuisine, to impart tanginess.It can be made of many fishes like Bangude, Bhutai, etc. Another local fish dish is Fish Masala, which is popular in the coastal districts of Dakshina Kannada and Udupi.

== Background ==
Pulimunch/pulimunchi literally means "a gravy rich in tamarind juice". Mangalorean Fish Masala can be considered a "modern fast food" version of the traditional Fish Pulimunchi.

== Preparation and ingredients ==
The recipe for Fish Pulimunchi follows a blend of dry condiments like red chill, coriander, jeera, mustard, fenugreek seeds, dry roasted with turmeric, ginger, pepper corn. This is made into paste with tamarind juice or pulp, 3-4 pods of garlic, curry leaves and onion. Later tempered with little oil and curry leaves and the fish added with the curry paste and cooked till done. It is traditionally prepared in clay pots which enhances the taste of the curry. Tastes best with red rice.

Preparing Mangalorean Fish Masala involves stewing skinned and cleaned fish in a thick gravy. Even though the gravies for most seafood dishes consumed along the Arabian Sea coast have generous amounts of grated coconut, the Fish Masala gravy does not. The ingredients for the gravy are garlic, coriander, red chilli powder, ginger, onion and tomatoes. However, in coastal Kerala generous amounts of grated coconut is used. The tomatoes give a tangy taste to the dish. Recently, restaurants serving this dish have started using tomato puree and ketchups that are readily available in the market. Freshly chopped coriander leaves are used to garnish this dish.

== See also ==
- South Indian cuisine
- Cuisine of Karnataka
