= Linagpang =

Filipino cooking process

- Alternative names: nilagpang
- Course: Main course
- Place of origin: Philippines
- Region or state: Western Visayas
- Serving temperature: Hot
- Main ingredients: Chicken or fish, ginger, onions, tomatoes, scallions, chili
- Variations: Linagpang na manok, linagpang na isda

Linagpang or nilagpang is a Filipino cooking process that originates from the Western Visayas. It involves first char-grilling, roasting, or broiling chicken or fish and then adding them to a soup with tomatoes, onions, scallions, and ginger.

== Etymology ==
The name linagpang or nilagpang means "done in the manner of lagpang". The root verb lagpang means "to grill food over hot coals" in Visayan languages. It is a synonym of sugba, anag, and lambon; and equivalent to Tagalog ihaw. In some Cebuano-speaking areas of the Visayas, it is still used to refer to grilled food, but it is now more commonly used to refer to the soup dish.

== Description ==
Linagpang originates from the Hiligaynon people of the Western Visayas. The cooking process is derived from a way of consuming left-over grilled, roasted, or broiled chicken or fish and is still used in this way. But it can be prepared directly by first char-grilling, roasting, or broiling chicken or fish and then adding them to a soup with tomatoes, onions, scallions, and ginger. It is seasoned with salt, pepper, chilis, patis (fish sauce), or sugar to taste. Some versions also add pechay, basil, or coconut milk. The grilling adds a smoky dimension to the soup.

In the chicken version (linagpang na manok), the chicken is usually shredded into flakes and uses native chicken. While in the fish version (linagpang na isda), the fish is sliced into crosswise chunks with the skin intact. The name of the dish can also reflect the type of fish used. Common fish linagpang include linagpang na bangus (milkfish), linagpang na tilapia (tilapia), and linagpang na turagsoy (common snakehead, known in Philippine English as "mudfish").

== See also ==
- Lechon manok
- Philippine cuisine
