= À l'amiral =

Amiral (a'l') is a particular garnish, such as poached sole, fillet of sole, stuffed turbot, or braised salmon. It contains some of the following ingredients:

- fried oyster and mussels
- crayfish tails or whole crayfish
- mushroom caps
- truffle slices.

The dish can also be garnished with a Nantua sauce. The term also describes a type of consommé.
