= Catfish stew =

Dish in Southern United States

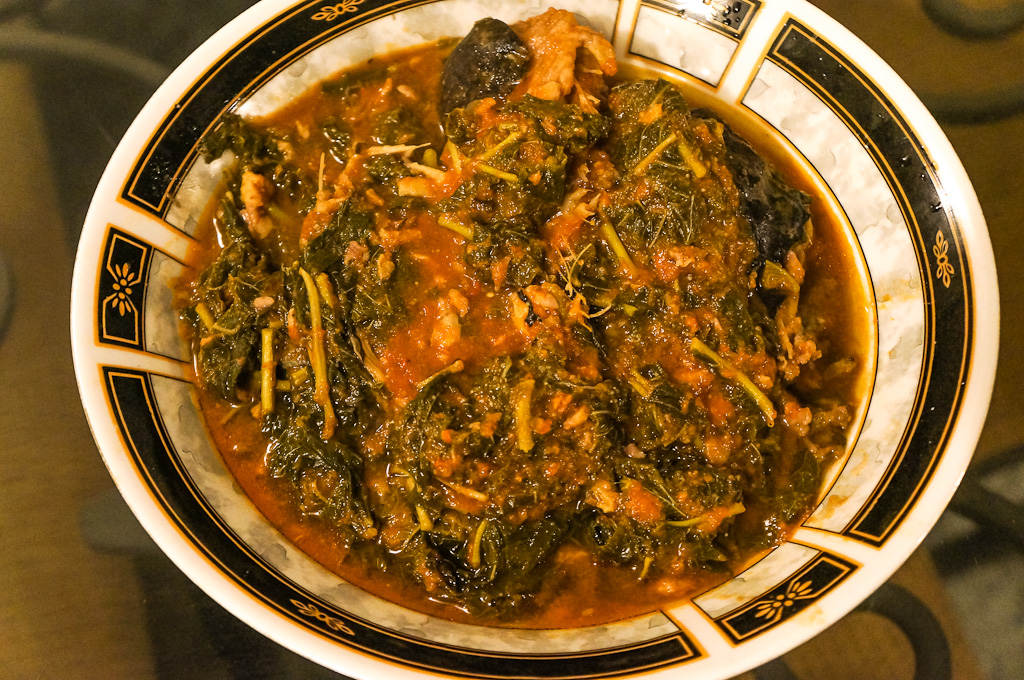
- Nigeria catfish stew
- Type: Stew
- Place of origin: United States
- Region or state: Southern United States
- Main ingredients: Catfish, tomatoes, potatoes, and onions, hot sauce or Tabasco sauce

Catfish stew is a dish commonly found in the Southern United States, particularly in South Carolina. It typically consists of catfish fillets (taken from the sides of the fish as the belly meat is considered to be of poor quality) which are heavily boiled so that they fall apart, and is then combined with crushed tomatoes, potatoes, and onions. Occasionally the tomatoes may be omitted for "white catfish stew", and milk may be added for this style, though this variety is somewhat uncommon. Hot sauce or Tabasco sauce is often added as well.

== See also ==
- Fish stew
- List of stews
