= Salmon pie =

Savoury fish pie

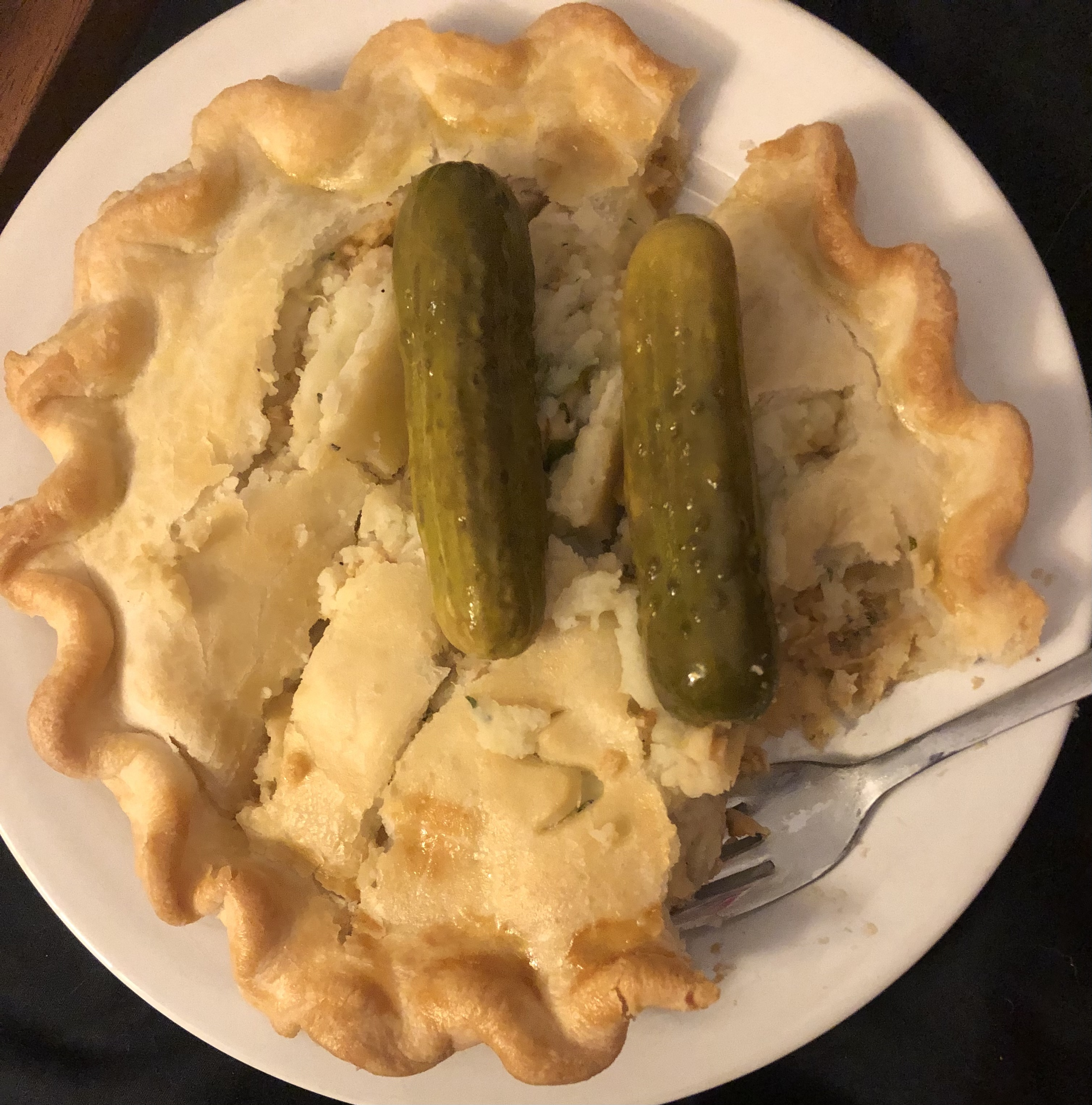
- Traditional Québécois salmon pie with pickles
- Type: Savoury pie Casserole
- Place of origin: Ireland, Quebec
- Main ingredients: Salmon, pie crust, potatoes, eggs
- Variations: Tourtière, sea-pie, chicken pie

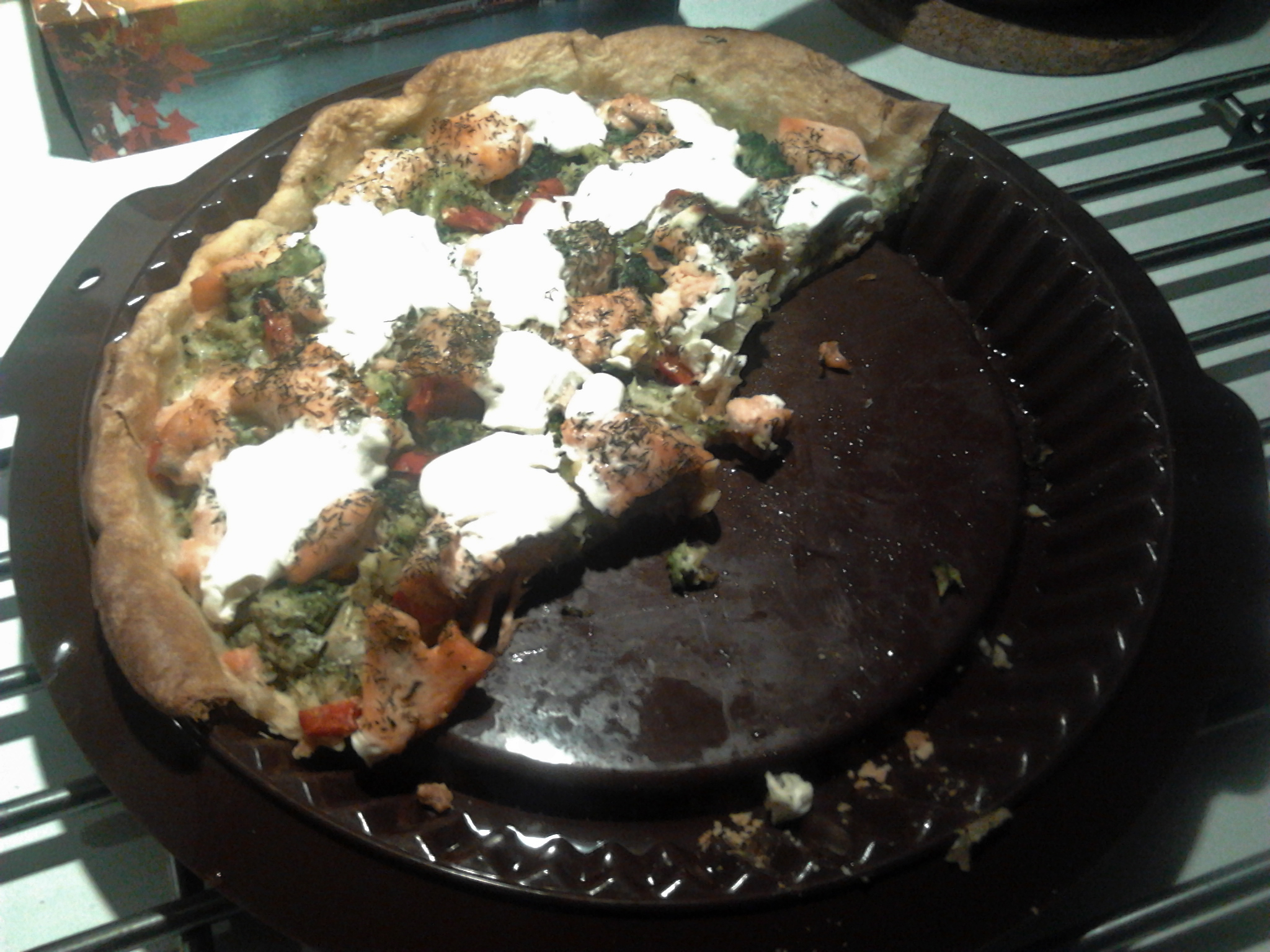
Alternate version with sour cream

Salmon pie, known as pâté au saumon in Quebec, is a pie or variant of tourtière filled with salmon.

In Ireland, the most popular form of salmon pie resembles more chicken pie, where distinct pieces of salmon are cooked in the pie, in a sauce resembling suprême sauce, in the base of which other ingredients have been cooked. The Irish also call salmon pie something that closely matches cottage pie or pâté chinois, where salmon is at the base of an assembly, like for cottage pie, or at the base of a casserole, like for pâté chinois. Other ingredients may be part of the salmon base, and be superimposed, but in both cases the dish's assembly is completed by the application of mashed potatoes.

In its Quebec version, pâté au saumon, the pie is a preparation of cooked salmon and mashed potatoes, which, themselves, may include other ingredients such as eggs, parsley, black pepper, onion, etc. which would normally enter in their preparation, by the household or region. The mixture is then placed between pie crusts, and is otherwise prepared in the same manner as most other sweet and savory pies.
