= Patra Sherani =

- Town and union council
- Country: Pakistan
- Region: Balochistan
- District: Dera Bugti District
- Time zone: UTC+5 (PST)

Patra Sherani is a town and union council of Dera Bugti District in the Balochistan province of Pakistan.
