= Maeun-tang =

Korean spicy fish soup

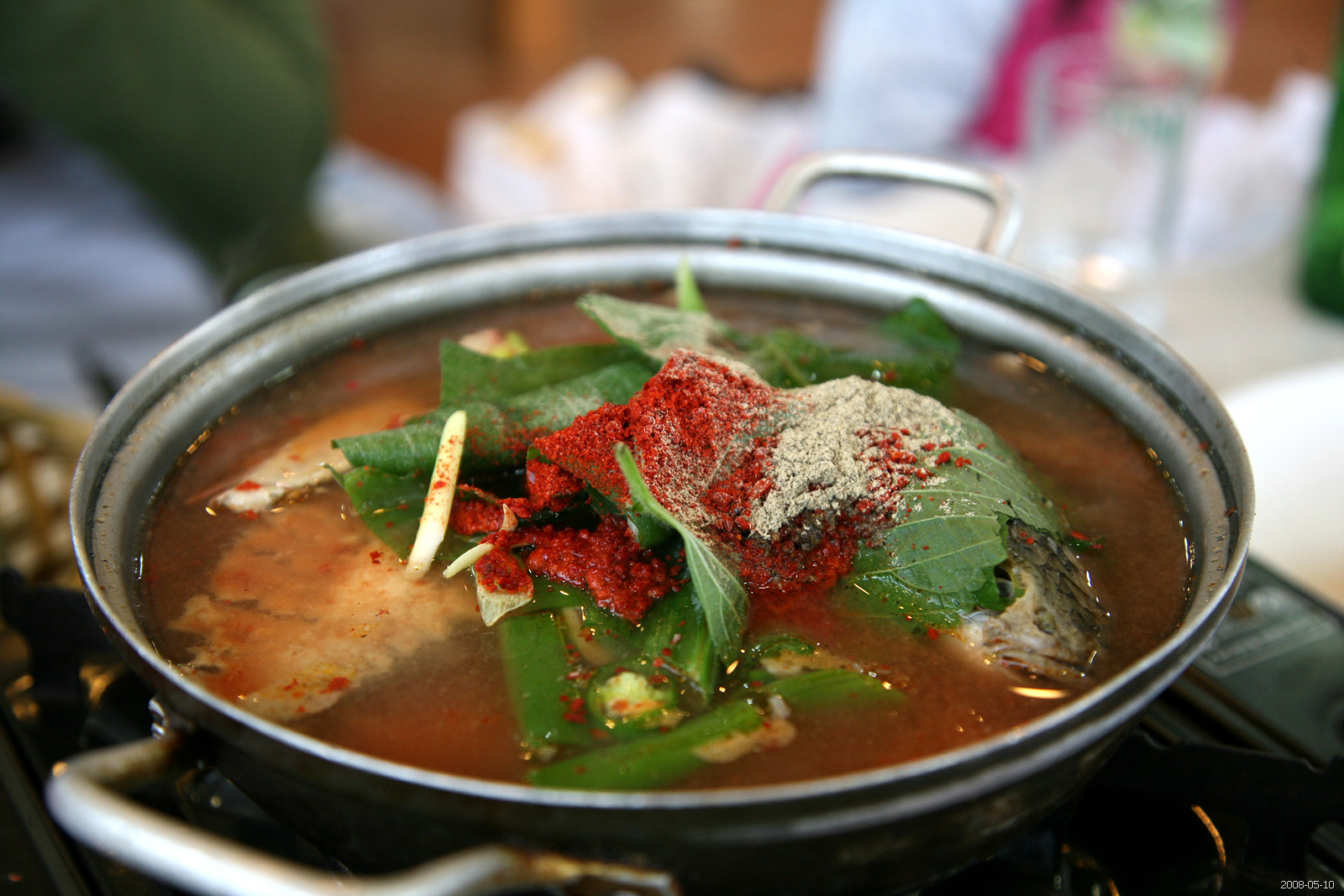
- Alternative names: Spicy fish stew
- Type: Tang
- Place of origin: Korea
- Main ingredients: Fish
- Ingredients generally used: Meat, vegetables, tofu, gochujang

Korean name
- Hangul: 매운탕
- Hanja: 매운湯
- RR: maeuntang
- MR: maeunt'ang
- IPA: [mɛ̝.un.tʰaŋ]

Maeun-tang (Korean: 매운탕) or spicy fish stew is a dish in Korean cuisine. It is a hot spicy fish soup boiled with gochujang (Korean red chili pepper paste), '고춧가루'(chili powder), and various vegetables. The name is a combination of two words: '매운', which derives from '맵다', meaning "hot and spicy"; and '탕(湯)', meaning "soup". As its main ingredient, fresh or saltwater fish is cut into several pieces and boiled with green vegetables such as watercress and garland chrysanthemum. Onion, radish, chilis, crown daisy, garlic, and sometimes zucchini and bean curd are added to the mixture to absorb the chili pepper paste which is the main flavoring of this dish. It is then seasoned with chili powder, garlic, soy sauce, and additional gochujang may be added once more to taste.

Restaurants that offer this dish often allow customers to select their fish from an aquarium. Many specialty seafood restaurants have several aquariums from which to choose. Popular fish for this dish may include red snapper, sea bass, yellow corvina, codfish, croaker, pollock, and even freshwater fish like carp and trout. In addition, other shellfish such as crabs, clams, and oysters can also be added to this soup to complement and enhance its spicy yet refreshing flavors.

This soup is one of Korea's most popular dishes while drinking soju. If ordered with hoe at a restaurant, the soup is typically then made from the leftover parts of the fish.

== Gallery ==
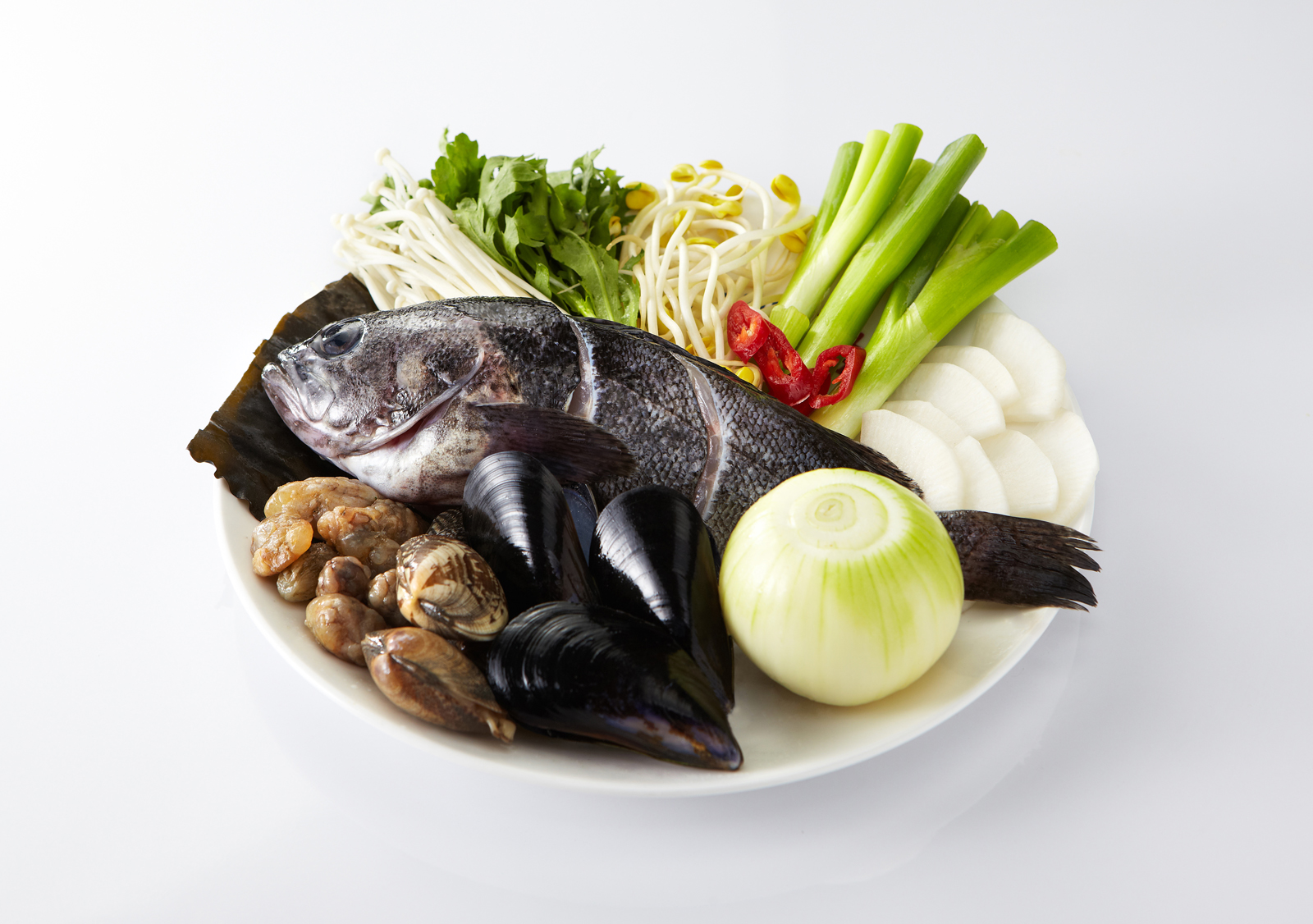
Maeuntang ingredients

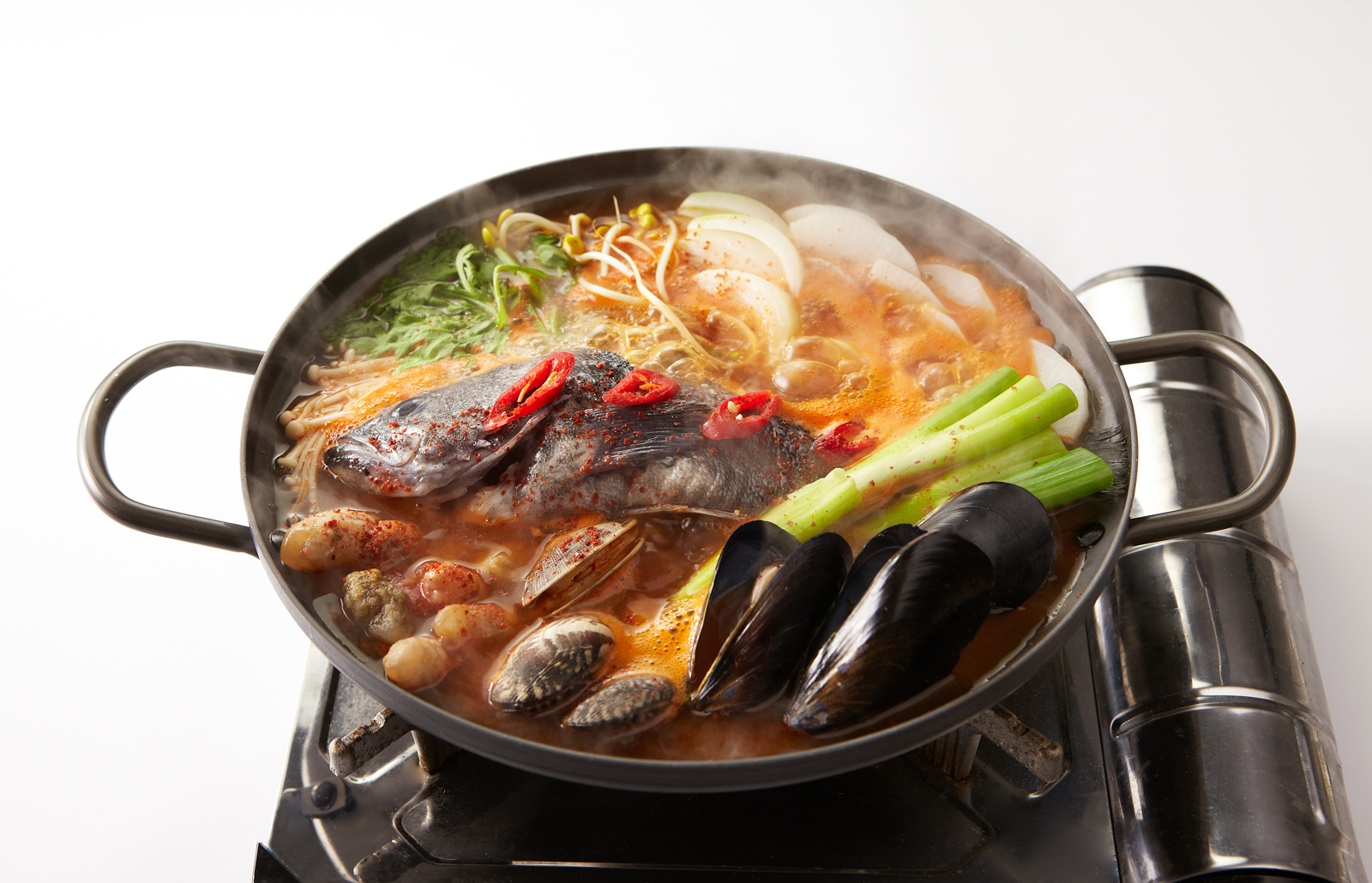
Maeuntang

== See also ==
- Halászlé
- List of soups
- List of seafood dishes
- List of fish dishes
- Korean cuisine
