= Patra ni machhi =

Indian dish

Patra ni machhi is an Indian dish originating from Parsi cuisine, which is made from steamed fish topped with chutney and wrapped in a banana leaf.
