= Women in Macau =

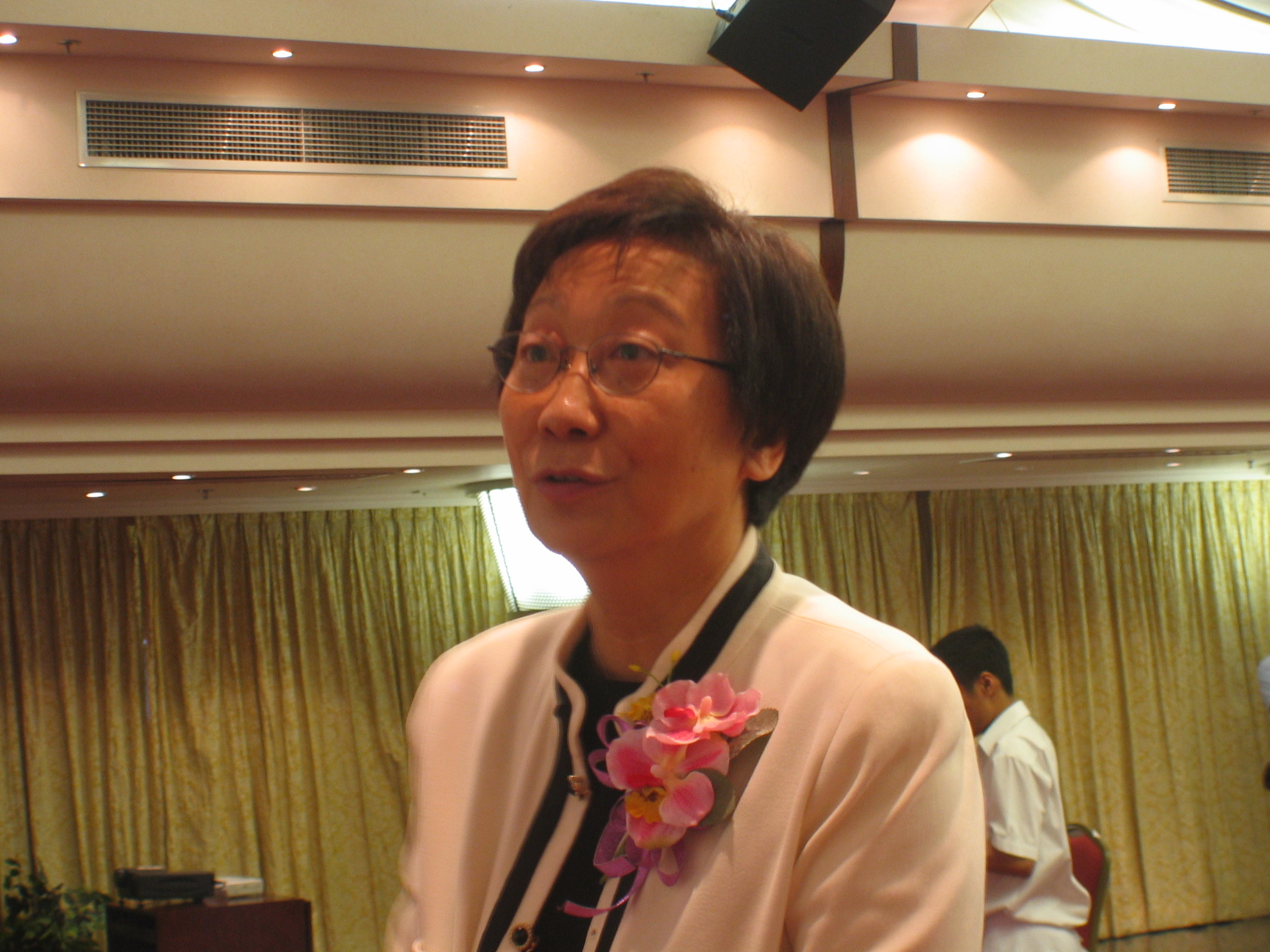
Susana Chou Vaz da Luz, also known as Chou Kei Jan, is a female politician in Macau.

Women in Macau, as described in 2010 by Candice Chio Ngan Ieng, president of the Macau Women's General Association (AGMM), are currently defining themselves as capable and irreplaceable powers to Macau's modern-day civilization.

== Education ==
According to a fact sheet produced by Mariette Bolina, child-rearing is often considered the role of women, but in the future, more women will decide to pursue an education. The improvement of the level of education received by women in Macau is often attributed to the overall improvement of quality of Macau's education system and the overall improvement of women's educational awareness. From 1970 to 2007, the number of female university students in Macau increased from 10.8 million to 77.4 million. According to Bolina, writing in 1994, the gender gap between Macau men and women can be eliminated through the pursuit of education.

== Workforce ==
The 1991 edition of the Employment Survey, using data from Macau's Statistic and Census Bureau, estimated that the labor participation rate of women was 44.35%. By 1996, the rate increased to 45.32%. The income level of employed women has increased since the 1990s, reducing the income gap between men and women. However, the proportion of women as low income households remains higher than that of men, while the proportion of women as high income households is much smaller. In 1994, women with an average monthly income of less than 1000 yuan accounted for 78.47% of the female population, women with monthly income of between 1,501 to 2,000 yuan accounted for 84.58% of the female population, and women with a monthly income of 2,001 to 2,500 yuan accounted for 70.12% of the female population, while women with an average monthly income of more than 2,500 yuan accounted for only 28.1% of the female population, while men accounted for 71.86%. This shows that there still exists a major disparity between men and women's earnings in Macau.

== Family life ==
According to a survey from the Macau Women's Database, respondents were most dissatisfied with communication in their families, as well as the living environment, and getting alone with husband plus children's education. Their life experiences also vary with age. From age 18-30, respondents were most dissatisfied with communication in the family and economic situation. For respondents age 31-55, children's education and economic status were the topics of greatest concern. Respondents after age 56 were most concerned about communication in the family. In general, the happiness of family life for Macau women varies according to age, income and marital status.

According to a survey conducted by Xinxin Chen, most Macau women believe that their status in the family is equal to men but less so in greater society, younger women felt as though their social status was more egalitarian. This suggests that traditionalist attitudes are still somewhat persistent in Macau society but are waning in more familial settings and younger generations.

== Political participation ==
While under the colonial Portuguese, the affairs of Macau were all managed by Portuguese politicians. Chinese inhabitants rarely had adequate representation in local politics. The opportunities for women to participate in political affairs were even more so. After the period of colonization, the Special Administrative Region's Government enacted legislation to eliminate discrimination against women. In addition, various bureaus and departments have been founded to help advance and protect the equality of women and their welfare. This is exemplified by Article 38 of the Basic Law of the Macao Special Administrative Region of the People's Republic of China which states:

"Women's rights and interests are protected by the Macao Special Administrative Region."

== Notable Macau women ==
Florinda Chan became a noteworthy Feminist icon in Macau after she became the Chief of Administrator of Macau at age 45.

== Sex trafficking ==
Sex trafficking in Macau remains a commonplace practice and contentious concern. Women and girls, both local and foreign, are forced into prostitution in brothels, homes, and businesses in the city.

== See also ==
- Macau women's national ice hockey team
- Human trafficking in Macau
- Women in Asia
