= Crime in Macau =

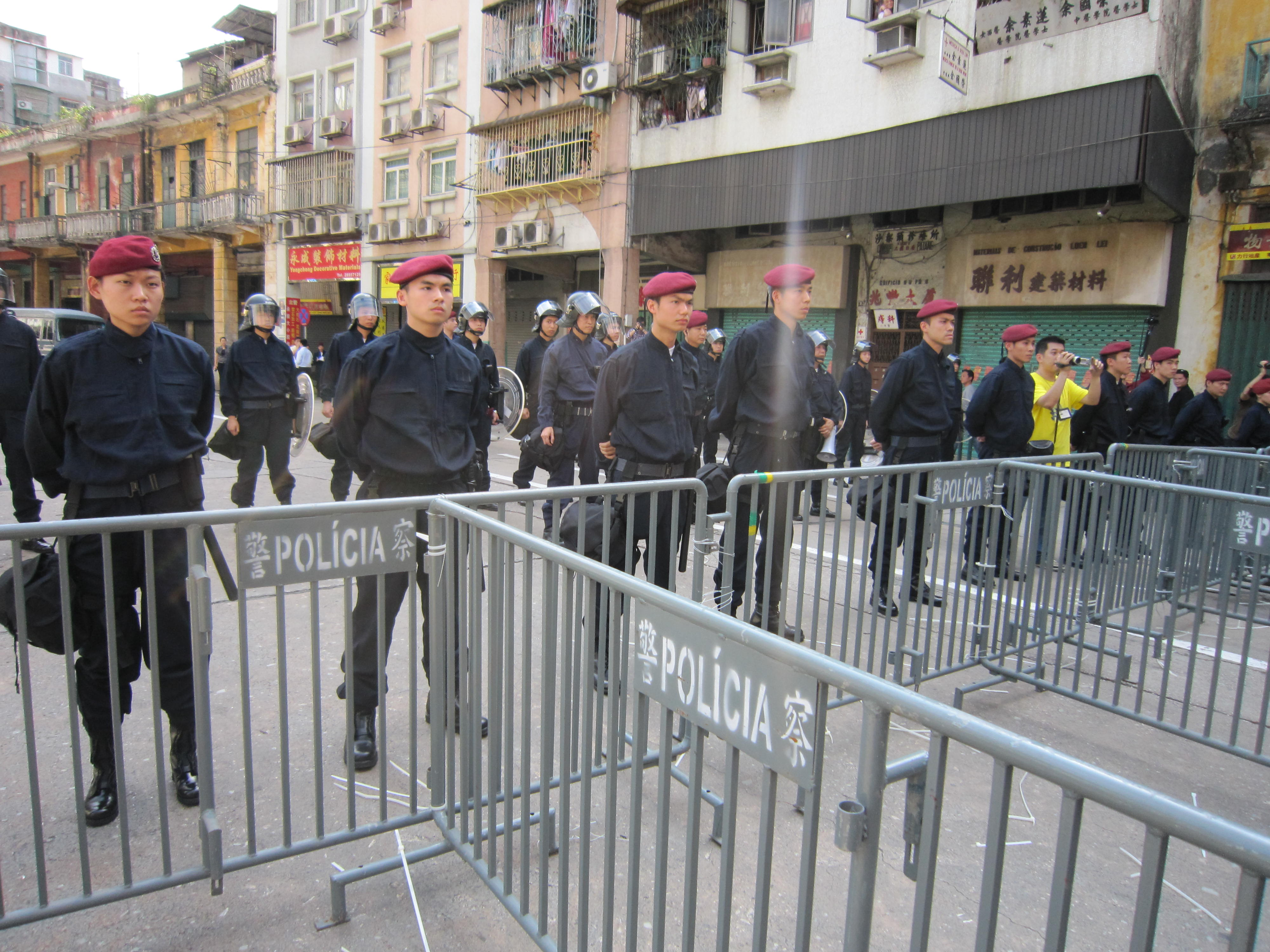
Public Security Police Force officers in May 2010.

Crime in Macau ranges from triad attacks, gang violence, money laundering, human trafficking, pickpocketing, petty theft, murder, corruption, etc.

== Law enforcement agencies ==
The Secretary for Public Security used to be the top law enforcement officer in the Portuguese Macau. After the handover of Macau from Portugal to China in 1999, the agency changed to Secretariat for Security.

== Types of crime ==
=== Civil unrest ===
There are several public demonstrations and strikes but they are rarely violent.

=== Human trafficking ===
Human trafficking in Macau is pervasive.

=== Sex trafficking ===
Sex trafficking in Macau is an issue. Macau and foreign women and girls are forced into prostitution in brothels, homes, and businesses in the city.

== Homicide ==
The number of homicide cases in Macau by year:

Year	Case count	Victims	Ref
2024	1	1	
2023	4	4	
2022	1	2	
2021	3	3	
2020	2	4 (Note: 2 dead and 2 injured)	
2019	2	2	
2018	2	2	
2017	3	3	
2016	1	1	
2015	1	1	
2014	0	0	
2013	2		

== See also ==
- Crime in China
