= Women in Asia =

Category of human beings

The evolution and history of women in Asia coincide with the evolution and history of Asian continent itself. They also correspond with the cultures that developed within the region. Asian women can be categorically grouped as women from the Asian subregions of Central Asia, East Asia, North Asia, South Asia, Southeast Asia, and West Asia.

== Culture ==
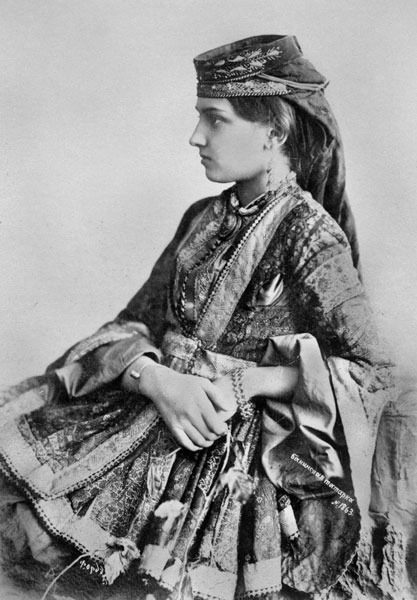
An Armenian girl from New Julfa, Isfahan, Late 19th Century

=== Traditional roles ===
Due to the patriarchal nature of traditional Armenian culture and society, women in Armenia are often expected to be virtuous and submissive, to safeguard their virginity until marriage, and assume primarily domestic tasks.

Traditional social norms and lagging economic development in Azerbaijan's rural regions continue to restrict women's roles in society and the economy, and there were reports that women had difficulty exercising their legal rights due to gender discrimination.

Women in Cambodia, sometimes referred to as Khmer women, are supposed to be modest, soft-spoken, "light" walkers, well-mannered, industrious, belong to the household, act as the family's caregivers and caretakers and financial comptrollers, perform as the "preserver of the home", maintain their virginity until marriage, become faithful wives, and act as advisors and servants to their husbands. The "light" walking and refinement of Cambodian women is further described as being "quiet in [...] movements that one cannot hear the sound of their silk skirt rustling".

Throughout the history of Persia, Persian women (presently known as women in Iran), like Persian men, used make-up, wore jewellery and coloured their body parts. Moreover, their garments were both elaborate and colorful. Rather than being marked by gender, clothing styles were distinguished by class and status. Women in modern Iran (post 1935 "Persia") are of various mixes and appearances, both in fashion and social norm. Traditionally however, the "Persian woman" had a pre-defined appearance set by social norms that were the standard for all women in society.

Women in Kyrgyzstan traditionally had assigned roles, although only the religious elite sequestered women as was done in other Muslim societies.

Historically, women in Burma (Myanmar) have had a unique social status in Burmese society. According to the research made by Daw Mya Sein, Burmese women "for centuries – even before recorded history" owned a "high measure of independence" and had retained their "legal and economic rights" despite the influences of Buddhism and Hinduism. Burma once had a matriarchal system that includes the exclusive right to inherit oil wells and the right to inherit the position as village head. Burmese women were also appointed to high offices by Burmese kings, can become chieftainesses and queens.

Palestinian women were not expected to secure income for the family, but women were expected to adapt to the customary roles of women in Palestinian society wherein females were traditionally molded as inferior to men.

In Timor-Leste, due to traditional roles, women are unable to inherit or own property and face the cultural notion that women normally belong at the home.

The role of women in Turkmenistan has never conformed to Western stereotypes about Muslim women. Although a division of labor exists and women usually are not visible actors in political affairs outside the home, Turkmen women have never worn a veil similar to that of the women of some of its neighboring countries. As Turkmenistan is a tribal nation, customs regarding women can vary within the country: for example, women in the eastern part of the country are permitted to drink some alcohol whereas women who live in the central portion of the country, particularly those of the Tekke tribe, are not permitted to imbibe alcohol. Most women possess a host of highly specialized skills and crafts, especially those connected with the household and its maintenance.

== Promoting gender equality ==
=== West Asia ===
==== Azerbaijan ====
Women in Azerbaijan nominally enjoy the same legal rights as men; however, societal discrimination is a problem. Universal suffrage was introduced in Azerbaijan in 1918 by the Azerbaijan Democratic Republic, thus making Azerbaijan the first Muslim country ever to enfranchise women. Most Bahraini women are also well represented in all of the major professions, women's societies, and women's organizations. Apart from having the right to vote, around one-quarter of the women of Bahrain are able to hold jobs outside the confines of the household.

==== Iran ====
The Iranian women's movement is based on the Iranian women's social movement for women's rights. This movement first emerged some time after the Iranian Constitutional Revolution in 1910, the year in which the first Women Journal was published by women. The movement lasted until 1933 in which the last women's association was dissolved by the Reza Shah Pahlavi’s government. It heightened again after the Iranian Revolution (1979). Between 1962 and 1978, the Iranian women's movement gained tremendous victories: women won the right to vote in 1963 as part of Mohammad Reza Shah's White Revolution, and were allowed to stand for public office, and in 1975 the Family Protection Law provided new rights for women, including expanded divorce and custody rights and reduced polygamy. Following the 1979 Revolution, several laws based on gender discrimination were established such as the introduction of mandatory veiling and public dress code of females. Women's rights since the Islamic Revolution has varied. About 9% of the Iranian parliament members are women, while the global average is 13%. Following the Revolution, women were allowed to join the police and military forces.

The women's rights movement in Iran continues to attempt influencing reforms, particularly with the One Million Signatures Campaign to End Discrimination Against Women.

==== Saudia Arabia ====
All women, regardless of age, are required to have a male guardian in Saudi Arabia. The World Economic Forum 2009 Global Gender Gap Report ranked Saudi Arabia 130th out of 134 countries for gender parity. It was the only country to score a zero in the category of political empowerment. The report also noted that Saudi Arabia is one of the few Middle Eastern countries to improve from 2008, with small gains in economic opportunity.

21% of Saudi women are in the workforce and make up 16.5% of the overall workforce.

There is evidence that some women in Saudi Arabia do not want change. Even many advocates of reform reject Western critics, for "failing to understand the uniqueness of Saudi society." Journalist Maha Akeel is a frequent critic of her country's patriarchal customs. Nonetheless, she agrees that Westerners criticize what they do not understand. She has said: "Look, we are not asking for ... women's rights according to Western values or lifestyles ... We want things according to what Islam says. Look at our history, our role models."

==== Kuwait ====
Women in Kuwait are considered to be among the most emancipated women in the Gulf region. Women in Kuwait can travel, drive, and work without their fathers' or husbands' consent and they even hold senior government positions. Women in Kuwait are able to work freely and can achieve positions of power and influence.

Women in Kuwait gained the right to vote and stand in parliamentary and local elections in May 2005. And in October 2009 Kuwait's constitutional court ruled that women were able to gain their own passports, without the consent of their husbands.

==== Oman ====
Women now pursue careers and professional training in Oman, slowly moving from their previous household confinement to the public sphere. In Oman, 17 October is celebrated every year as the Omani Women's Day with various pro-female events.

==== Lebanon ====
Due to the large number of officially recognized religions in Lebanon, Lebanese family matters are governed by at least 15 personal statute codes. Lebanese women have legal protection that varies depending on their religion. Marriageable age can be as young as 12.5, polygamy is allowed if the male of the family is Muslim, parental authority belongs to the patriarch of the house and legal guardian of all children, and female children receive less inheritance than a male child would. Children born to a Lebanese woman and a man from another country will not have their children granted Lebanese nationality.

==== Syria ====
Syria Comment described that Syrian women have been able to acquire several rights that have not been granted to their counterparts in other Arab nations. Such rights include the custody of children aged 15 years old or younger; and the right to give their nationality to their offspring whose father is not a national of Syria. A common attire of women, particularly in Damascus, are Western clothing that includes long skirts, pants, jeans, high-heeled shoes, in addition to the sporting of the hijab and the monteau (a type of coat), sometimes accented by a “coordinating purse”.

==== United Arab Emirates ====
The role of women in the United Arab Emirates has advanced greatly in recent years, making the UAE a leader in women's rights in the Arab world. Though there were few opportunities for women outside the home before 1960, the discovery of oil led to advancement in women's position. The UAE constitution guarantees equality between men and women in areas including legal status, claiming of titles, and access to education. The General Women's Union (GWU), established by HH Sheikha Fatima bint Mubarak wife of then President Sheikh Zayed bin Sultan Al Nahyan, remains a strong component of the State's and participating organizations' various initiatives. In the 2007/2008 United Nations Development Programme report, the UAE ranked 29th among 177 countries in the Gender Empowerment Measures, the best rating received in the Arab World. UNDP's Millennium Development Goal No. 3, to “Promote Gender Equality and Empower Women” has reached its targeted levels of female participation in primary education and continues to increase.

==== Yemen ====
Women in Yemen have historically had much less power in society than men. Although the government of Yemen has made efforts that will improve the rights of women in Yemen (including the formation of a Women's Development Strategy and a Women Health Development Strategy), many cultural and religious norms, along with poor enforcement of this legislation from the Yemeni government, have prevented Yemeni women from having equal rights to men.

Today, Yemeni women do not hold many economic, social or cultural rights. Even more striking is the reality that while suffrage was gained in 1967 and constitutional and legal protection was extended to women during the first years of Yemen unity between 1990 and 1994, they continue to struggle “in exercising their full political and civil rights”. History shows that women have played major roles in Yemeni society. Some women of pre-Islamic and early Islamic Yemen held elite status in society. The Queen of Sheba, for example, “is a source of pride for the Yemeni nation”. In addition, Queen Arwa has been noted for her attention to infrastructure, which added to a documented time of prosperity under her rule. Modern day women of Yemen, however, are subject to a society that reflects largely agrarian, tribal, and patriarchal traditions. This, combined with illiteracy and economic issues has led women to continuously be deprived of their rights as citizens of Yemen.

=== Central Asia ===
==== Kazakhstan ====
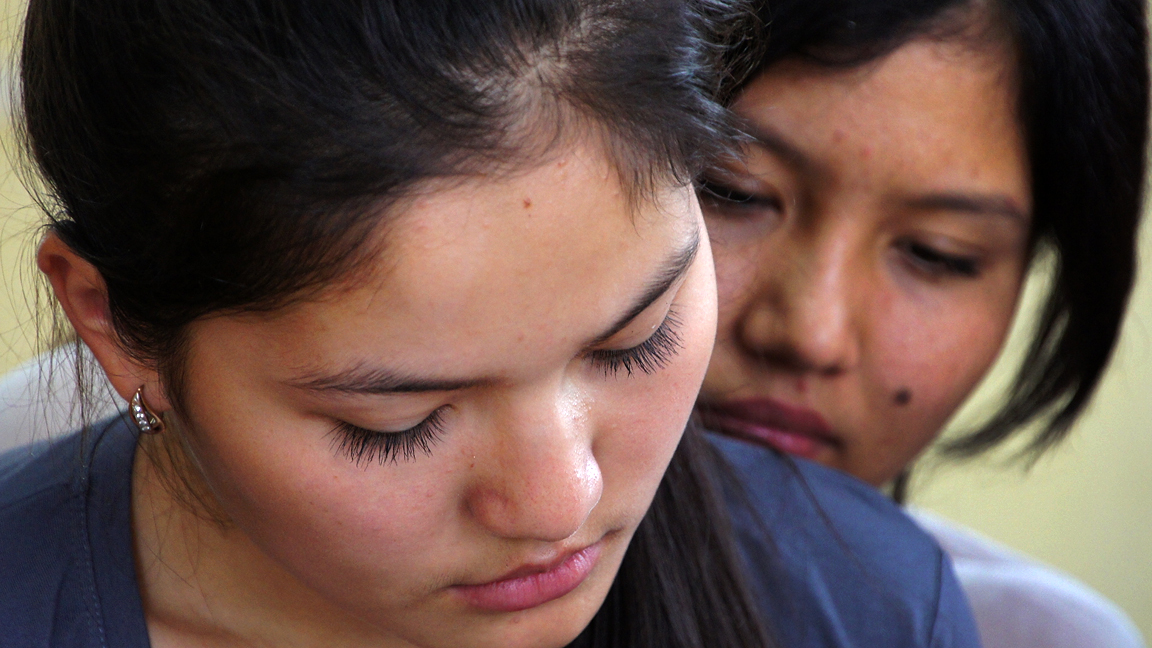
Two young women in Kazakhstan

Women in the country went through a difficult period in the 1990s, when Kazakhstan's economy, being in a period of transition, experienced a strong decline and destabilization: by 1995 real GDP dropped to 61,4% of its 1990 level, resulting also in a brain drain. Nevertheless, the 1990s also had some positives for women, such as the accession to the Convention on the Elimination of All Forms of Discrimination Against Women in 1998.

==== Kyrgyzstan ====
Because of the demands of the nomadic economy, women in Kyrgyzstan worked as virtual equals with men, having responsibility for chores such as milking as well as child-rearing and the preparation and storage of food. In the ordinary family, women enjoyed approximately equal status with their husbands, within their traditional roles.

==== Turkmenistan ====
During the Soviet period, women in Turkmenistan assumed responsibility for the observance of some Muslim rites to protect their husbands' careers. Many women entered the work force out of economic necessity, a factor that disrupted some traditional family practices and increased the incidence of divorce. At the same time, educated urban women entered professional services and careers.

==== Uzbekistan ====
The social and legal situation of women in Uzbekistan has been influenced by local traditions, religion, the Soviet rule, and changing social norms since independence.

=== South Asia ===
==== Bangladesh ====
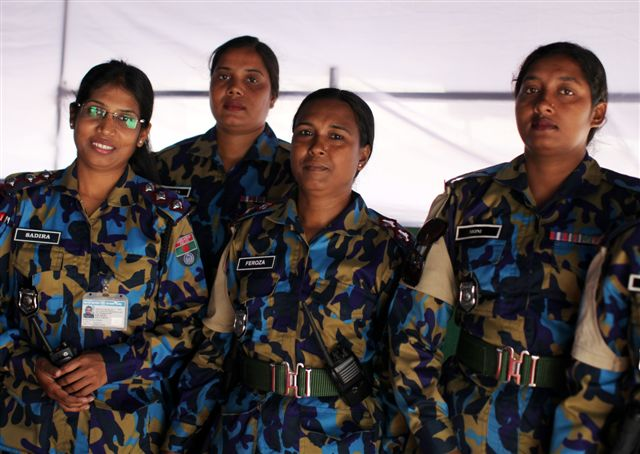
Bangladeshi women peacekeepers at MONUSCO, Kinshasa

As of 2023, Bangladesh has a Gender Development Index of .918.

==== India ====
The status of women in India has been subject to many great changes over the past few millennia. From equal status with men in ancient times through the low points of the medieval period, to the promotion of equal rights by many reformers, the history of women in India has been eventful.

Available data on health, nutrition, education, and economic performance indicated that in 2014, women's participation in the workforce was 57%.

==== Pakistan ====
The Pakistani women of today enjoy a better status than most Muslim women. However, on an average, the women's situation vis-à-vis men is one of systemic gender subordination, although there have been attempts by the government and enlightened groups to elevate the status of women in Pakistani society. Now due to much awareness among people the educational opportunities for the Pakistani women increased in the previous years. According to a Human Development Report released by the United Nations, Pakistan has better gender equality than neighbouring India. However, in 2012, the World Economic Forum ranked the gender gap in Pakistan, Chad, and Yemen as the worst in their Global Gender Gap Report.

=== East Asia ===
==== China ====
October 1, 1949 marks the formal establishment of the People's Republic of China. Since 1949, the government of the People's Republic of China has actively promoted the cultural, social, economic and political roles of women in order to improve women's liberation. The new government of the People's Republic made a commitment to achieve equality between women and men. While advancing towards equality among men and women, the efforts met resistance in a traditionally Confucian society of male superiority.

Although equality among men and women has been a long-term goal of the People's Republic of China, the dramatic reformations that followed the Cultural Revolution (1966–1976) have inconsistently affected women's empowerment and status in China. Studies shows that Chinese women experienced rapid progress in terms of gender equality during the Cultural Revolution. When the People's Republic of China was established, employed women accounted for only 7 percent of the workforce; whereas in 1992 women's participation in the workforce had increased to account for 38 percent. Women's representation in higher educational institutions has also increased since the establishment of the People's Republic of China. Under the traditional Chinese patriarchy structure, the society was male-dominated, and women in Hong Kong had a relatively subordinate familial role. However, there is a cultural change in Hong Kong during the British colonial period with an emergence of Western culture (i.e. "Westernization"). A mix of traditional Chinese culture and Western values creates a unique culture of Hong Kong. Along with the rapid economic and social development of Hong Kong since the end of the Second World War, a significant improvement in the role of men has been witnessed, while female dominance society structure is still taking in place. Hence, women studies in Hong Kong are slightly differ from China's. Women in Hong Kong are generally more independent, monetarily autonomous, assertive, and career-focused; which makes them seem to be more prominent when comparing with women in some other Southeast Asian countries. With the increase number of women in professional and managerial positions in recent decades, the terms of "female strong person" or "superwomen" are being used to describe women in Hong Kong. Candice Chio Ngan Ieng, president of the Macau Women's General Association (AGMM), describes in 2010 that women are currently defining themselves as capable and irreplaceable powers to Macau's modern-day civilization. This change is happening despite the slowness in the Macanese people's absorption of the ideological concept of gender equality.

=== Southeast Asia ===
==== Cambodia ====
As financial controllers, the women of Cambodia can be identified as having real household authority at the familial level. In recent years, women have become more active in the traditionally male-dominated spheres of work and politics in Cambodia.

==== Indonesia ====
The roles of Indonesian women today are being affected by many factors, including increased modernization, globalization, improved education and advances in technology (in particular communications technology). Many women in Indonesia choose to reside in cities instead of staying in townships to perform agricultural work because of personal, professional, and family-related necessities, and economic requirements. These women are moving away from the traditional dictates of Indonesian culture, wherein women act simply and solely as wives and mothers. At present, the women of Indonesia are also venturing actively into the realm of national development, and working as active members of organizations that focus and act on women's issues and concerns.

==== Laos ====
Laotian women have long been active participants in their nation's society, involved in politics, driving social transformation and development, becoming active in the world of business and serving as nurses and food producers for the military. Due to modernization and rural uprooting, Lao women have begun to embrace lifestyles that are foreign to traditional Laotian ideals.

==== Vietnam ====
Women in Vietnam played a significant role in defending Vietnam during the Vietnam War from 1945 to 1975. They took roles such as village patrol guards, intelligence agents, propagandists, and military recruiters. By becoming "active participants" in the struggle to liberate their country from foreign occupation, Vietnamese women were able to free themselves from "centuries of Confucian influence that had made them second-class citizens". Historically, this character and spirit of Vietnamese women were first exemplified by the conduct of the Trung sisters, the “first historical figures” in the history of Vietnam who revolted against Chinese control. These "women warriors" are not only fighting to protect their families, but also to preserve their culture. Trung Trac, the elder Trung sister, sacrificed herself and drowned over surrendering to foreign conquerors. This trait is also epitomized in the old Vietnamese adage: "When war comes, even women have to fight", and its variation: "When the enemy is at the gate, the woman goes out fighting"."Ba Me Anh Hung" (Hero Mothers), which is a term that has been coined recently, illustrates that even though Vietnamese women did not contribute greatly in combat, they were heroes that took care of children and overcame poverty. While the men were away in war, these women worked domestically to build up the next generation and the future of the country. Vietnamese women's roles in society would in turn develop Vietnam's socioeconomic status. "Women are laborers, citizens, mothers, and the first teachers of people..."

==== Malaysia ====
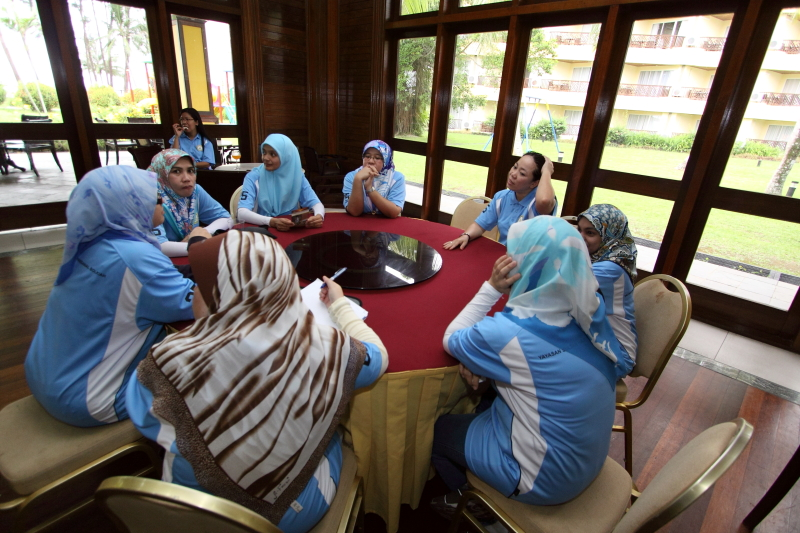
Malaysian women sit at a restaurant, 2009.

Women in Malaysia receives support from the Malaysian government concerning their rights to advance, to make decisions, to health, education and social welfare, and to the removal of legal obstacles. The Malaysian government has ensured these factors through the establishment of Ministry of National Unity and Social Development in 1997 (formerly known in 1993 as Women's Affairs Secretariat or HAWA). This was followed by the formation of the Women's Affairs Ministry in 2001 to recognize the roles and contributions of Malaysian women. Around 47% of Malaysian women are in the workforce.

==== Philippines ====
Although they generally define themselves in the milieu of a masculine dominated post-colonial Asian Catholic society, Filipino women live in a culture that is focused on the community, with the family as the main unit of society. It is in this framework of Philippine hierarchical structure, class differences, religious justifications, and living in a globally developing nation that Filipino women struggle for respect. Compared to other parts of Southeast Asia, women in Philippine society have always enjoyed a greater share of legal equality.

==== Singapore ====
Women in Singapore, particularly those who have joined Singapore's workforce, are faced with balancing their traditional and modern-day roles in Singaporean society and economy. According to the book The Three Paradoxes: Working Women in Singapore written by Jean Lee S.K., Kathleen Campbell, and Audrey Chia, there are "three paradoxes" confronting and challenging the career women of Singapore. Firstly, Singapore's society expects women to become creative and prolific corporate workers who are also expected to play the role of traditional women in the household, particularly as wife and mother. Secondly, Singaporean women are confronted by the "conflict between work and family" resulting from their becoming members of the working population. Thirdly, Singapore's female managers are still fewer in number despite their rising educational level and attainments when compared to male managers.

==== Thailand ====
The roles of women in Thailand's national development has not yet been fully established. Factors that affect women's participation in the socio-economic field include "inadequate gender awareness in the policy and planning process" and social stereotyping.

==== Timor-Leste ====
One of the organizations that promote empowerment and foster gender equality for the women of Timor-Leste is the United Nations Development Fund for Women (UNIFEM).

=== Women in government ===
==== Azerbaijan ====
As of 2007, several women in Azerbaijan held senior government positions, including deputy speaker of parliament, several deputy ministers, and deputy chair of the Central Election Commission. There are no legal restrictions on the participation of women in politics. As of 2011, there were 19 women in the 125-seat parliament. The percentage of female members of parliament increased from 11 to 16 percent between 2005 and 2010.

==== Saudia Arabia ====
Women cannot vote or be elected to high political positions in Saudi Arabia. However, King Abdullah has declared that women will be able to vote and run in the 2015 local elections, and be appointed to the Consultative Assembly.

==== Bangladesh ====
In modern Bangladesh, women have held high offices in Bangladesh including the speaker of parliament and the office of Prime Minister.

==== India ====
In modern India, women have held high offices in India including that of the President, Prime Minister, Speaker of the Lok Sabha and Leader of the Opposition. As of 2011, the Speaker of the Lok Sabha and the Leader of the Opposition in the Lok Sabha (Lower House of the parliament) were women.

==== Taiwan ====
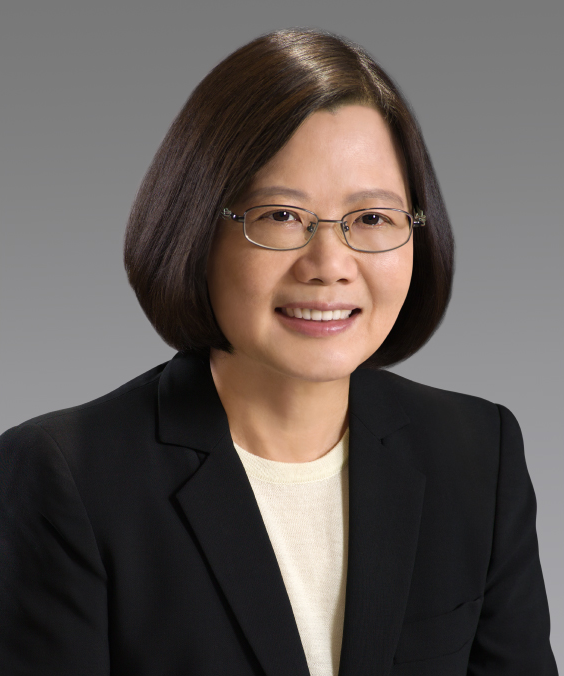
Tsai Ing-wen, elected as president of Taiwan in 2016. She is the first Asian female elected as either head of state or head of government without political family background.

Women in Taiwan have especially achieved prominent roles in politics. In 2000, feminist movement advocator Annette Lu elected as first female vice president while Yeh Chu-lan was promoted to be the first female vice premier in 2004. In 2016, Tsai Ing-wen was elected as president of Taiwan. Nevertheless, as in other parts of East Asia, sex-selective abortion is reported to happen in Taiwan.

==== Thailand ====
Women in Thailand were among the first women in Asia who were granted the right to vote in 1932. However, they are still underrepresented in Thai politics.

== Violence and sexual harassment against women ==
Violence against women in Afghanistan is high, although the situation is improving slowly as the country progresses with the help of the international community.

Bride kidnapping occurs in Azerbaijan. In the Azeri kidnap custom, a young woman is taken to the home of the abductor's parents through either deceit or force. Regardless of whether rape occurs or not, the woman is generally regarded as impure by her relatives, and is therefore forced to marry her abductor.

Women in India continue to face atrocities such as rape, acid throwing, dowry killings while young girls are forced into prostitution; as of late rape has seen a sharp increase following several high-profile cases of young girls brutally raped in public areas. According to a global poll conducted by Thomson Reuters, India is the "fourth most dangerous country" in the world for women, and the worst country for women among the G20 countries.

Societal discrimination and domestic violence against women has been identified as a significant problem, particularly in the Israeli Bedouin society.

In the 21st century, the issue of violence against women in Kazakhstan has come to public attention, resulting in the Law on the Prevention of Domestic Violence of 2009. However, as in other parts of Central Asia, bride kidnapping remains a problem.

Local and regional NGOs have helped to increase awareness of violence against women in Lebanon. Government policies regarding this are poor however, and attempts to improve this area have been met with resistance. Lebanon's laws do not recognize the concept of spousal rape, and attempt to add this to law have been attacked by Lebanese clerics.

Pakistani women face atrocities like rape, acid throwing, honour killings, forced marriages, forced prostitution and the buying and selling of women. The past few years have been witness to a steep increase in such crimes.

Rape cases and sexual slavery were allegedly committed by East Timorese pro-integration militias during the September 1999 crisis in East Timor (Timor-Leste).

=== Forced sterilization ===
Although Uzbek law provides some safeguards for the security of women in the country, women continue to face numerous problems, especially violence. There are reports that forced sterilization of women is practiced in Uzbekistan. A BBC World Service "Assignment" report on 12 April 2012 uncovered evidence that women are being sterilized, often without their knowledge, in an effort by the government to control the population.

=== Sex-selective abortion and female infanticide ===
Armenia is one of the countries in Asia which faces the issue of sex-selective abortion. Reports of female infanticide following the execution of the One-child policy indicated the persistence of women's low status in China.

== Notable women in Asia ==
=== Women Academics & Scientists ===
- Dr. Firdausi Qadri – A Bangladeshi immunologist known for her groundbreaking work in developing affordable vaccines against cholera and typhoid.
- Gagandeep Kang – Virologist and leading vaccine researcher. First Indian woman elected to the Fellowship of the Royal Society.
- Anindita Datta – Feminist geographer, Vice President of IGU. Pioneering work on gendered geographies and spatial violence.
- Yamuna Krishnan – Noted biophysicist and chemical biologist, known for work in DNA nanotechnology.
- Manjula Batra – Professor and gender rights researcher in law and political science.
- Bina Agarwal - Indian development economist and Professor of Development Economics and Environment at the Global Development Institute at The University of Manchester.
- Tu Youyou – Pharmaceutical chemist whose discovery of artemisinin, first-ever Chinese woman to receive a Nobel Prize in the sciences

=== Women in politics and leadership ===
- Indira Gandhi – First woman prime minister of India.
- Sheikh Hasina – Longest-serving prime minister of Bangladesh.
- Bidya Devi Bhandari – Politician who served as first woman president of Nepal
- Sirimavo Bandaranaike – World’s first woman prime minister (Sri Lanka, 1960).
- Miriam Defensor-Santiago - Filipino scholar, academic, lawyer, judge, author, stateswoman, and politician who served in all three branches of the Philippine government: judicial, executive, and legislative.
- Chandrika Kumaratunga – Former president of Sri Lanka.
- Meira Kumar – First woman Speaker of Lok Sabha.
- Benazir Bhutto - Politician who served as Prime Minister of Pakistan twice.
- Malala Yousafzai - Education activist and the youngest-ever Nobel Peace Prize laureate.
- Wu Yi – Retired Chinese politician often dubbed the "Iron Lady of China".
- Golda Meir - One of the founders of modern Israel, prime minister from 1969-1974.
- Aung San Suu Kyi - Important political leader in Myanmar, mostly in opposition.

=== Women who impacted history ===
- Mandukhai Khatun - Wise Queen of Northern Yuan in Mongolia.
- Trieu Thi Trinh - female warrior in 3rd century Vietnam who managed, for a time, to resist the rule of the Chinese Eastern Wu dynasty.
- Janyl-myrza- young woman in Kyrgyz oral literature who led her tribe to liberation from the enemy when no man in the tribe could do so.
- Rajia Sultan - Sultan of Delhi (r. 1236–1240) and the first female Muslim ruler of South Asia
- Rudrama Devi (d. 1289) – Warrior-queen of the Kakatiya kingdom in southern India.
- Mirabai (c. 1498–1547) – Rajput princess and Hindu Bhakti saint-poet from medieval India.
- Nur Jahan (1577–1645) – Empress of Mughal India and the chief consort of Emperor Jahangir.
- Queen Anula of Anuradhapura (d. 42 BC) – The first queen regnant in Sri Lankan history and arguably the first recorded female head of state in all of Asia.
- Empress Wu Zetian (624–705) – The only woman in Chinese history to rule as Emperor in her own right.
- Murasaki Shikibu (c. 973–1014) – A Japanese noblewoman and author of The Tale of Genji, often cited as the world’s first novel.
- Queen Seondeok of Silla (r. 632–647) – The first reigning queen of Korea (Kingdom of Silla) and one of the most celebrated monarchs in Korean history.
- Ban Zhao (45–116 CE) – A prominent scholar of China’s Han Dynasty, famous as the first known female Chinese historian
- Li Qingzhao (1084–1155) – A Song dynasty poet, widely regarded as China’s greatest woman poet

=== Women in Arts, Cinema, and Literature ===
- Amrita Pritam – Punjabi poet and novelist (India)
- Mahasweta Devi – Indian Bengali writer and activist
- Taslima Nasrin – Bangladeshi writer on gender and religion
- Deepa Mehta – Filmmaker known for feminist themes
- Aparna Sen, Nandita Das, Mira Nair – Filmmakers focusing on social issues
- Geetanjali Shree – First Indian to win International Booker Prize (2022)

=== Women in Grassroots Movements ===
- Medha Patkar – Environmentalist and social justice activist
- Qiu Jin - Chinese revolutionary, feminist, and writer
- Irom Sharmila – Civil rights activist from Manipur
- Anuradha Koirala – Nepali social activist renowned for her tireless fight against human trafficking.

== See also ==
- South East Asia Court of Women on HIV and Human Trafficking
- Missing women of Asia
- Asian Women (journal)
- Women in Buddhism
- Women in Hinduism
- Women in Islam
- Women in Sikhism

=== Central Asia ===
- Women in Kazakhstan
- Women in Kyrgyzstan
- Women in Tajikistan
- Women in Turkmenistan
- Women in Uzbekistan

=== East Asia ===
- Women in the People's Republic of China
- Women in Hong Kong
- Women in Japan
- Women in Macau
- Women in Mongolia
- Women in North Korea
- Women in South Korea
- Women in Taiwan
- Women in Tibet

=== South Asia ===
- Women in Afghanistan
- Women in Bangladesh
- Women in the British Indian Ocean Territory
- Women in Bhutan
- Women in India
- Gender inequality in India
- Gender pay gap in India
- Women in agriculture in India
- Women in Maldives
- Women in Nepal
- Women in Pakistan
- Women in Sri Lanka

=== Southeast Asia ===
- Women in Brunei
- Women in Cambodia
- Women in Indonesia
- Women in Laos
- Women in Malaysia
- Women in Myanmar
- Women in the Philippines
- Women in Singapore
- Women in Thailand
- Women in Timor-Leste
- Women in Vietnam

=== Western Asia ===
- Women in Armenia
- Women in Azerbaijan
- Women in Bahrain
- Women in Georgia
- Women in Iran
- Women in Iraq
- Women in Israel
- Women in Jordan
- Women in Kuwait
- Women in Lebanon
- Women in Oman
- Women in the Palestinian territories
- Women in Qatar
- Women in Saudi Arabia
- Women in Syria
- Women in the United Arab Emirates
- Women in Yemen
- Kurdish women
- Women in Turkey
- Negev Bedouin women
- Arab women
  - Sahrawi women
