= Women in Laos =

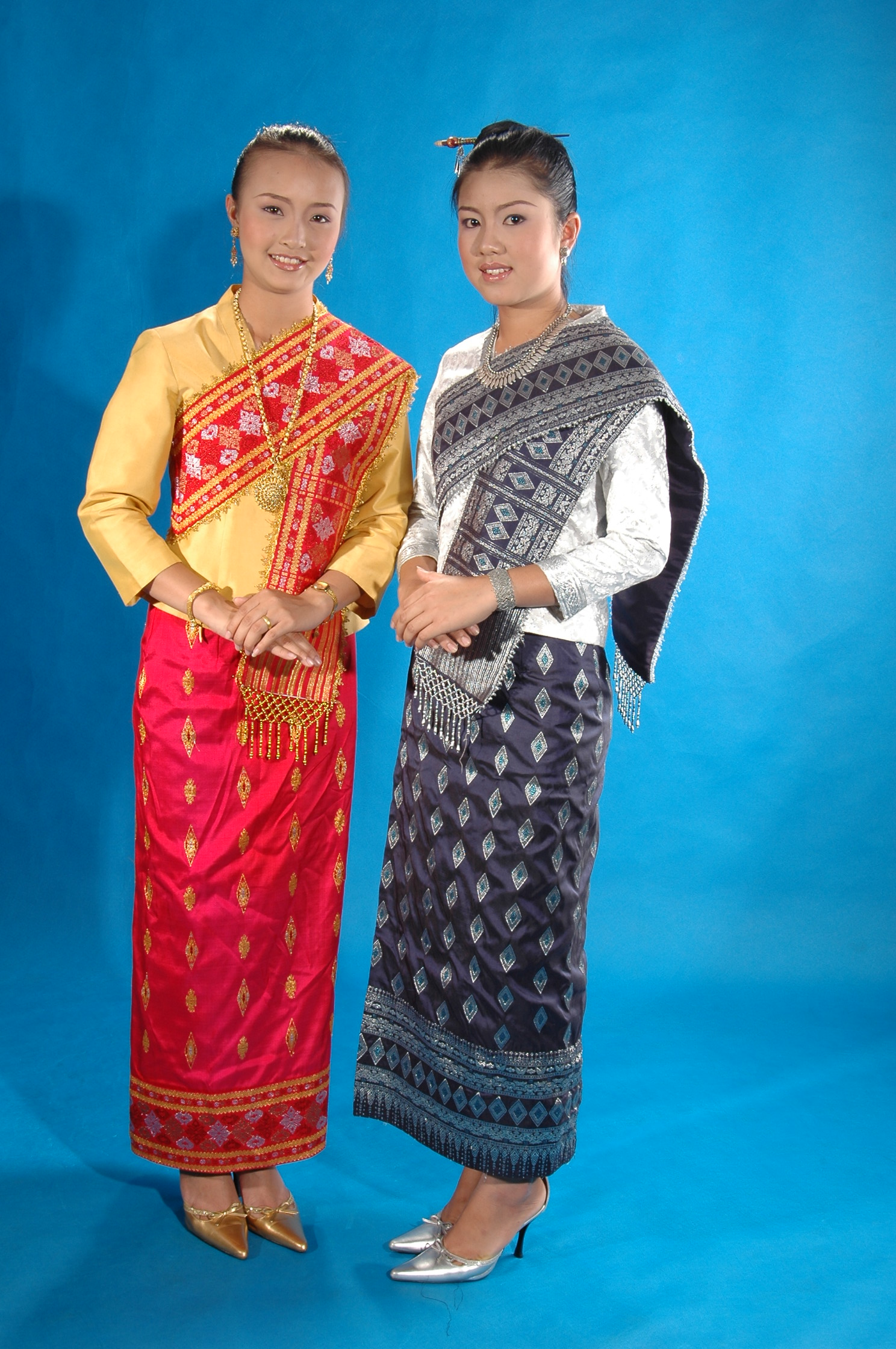
- 2 women in traditional clothes.

General statistics
- Maternal mortality (per 100,000): 470 (2010)
- Women in parliament: 25.0% (2012)
- Women over 25 with secondary education: 22.9% (2010)
- Women in labour force: 76.5% (2011)

Gender Inequality Index
- Value: 0.459 (2019)
- Rank: 113th out of 162

Global Gender Gap Index
- Value: 0.733 (2022)
- Rank: 53rd out of 146

Women have been active participants in Laos's society, involved in politics, driving social transformation and development, becoming active in the world of business. Due to modernization and rural uprooting, women have begun to embrace lifestyles that are foreign to certain ideals.

== Legal status ==
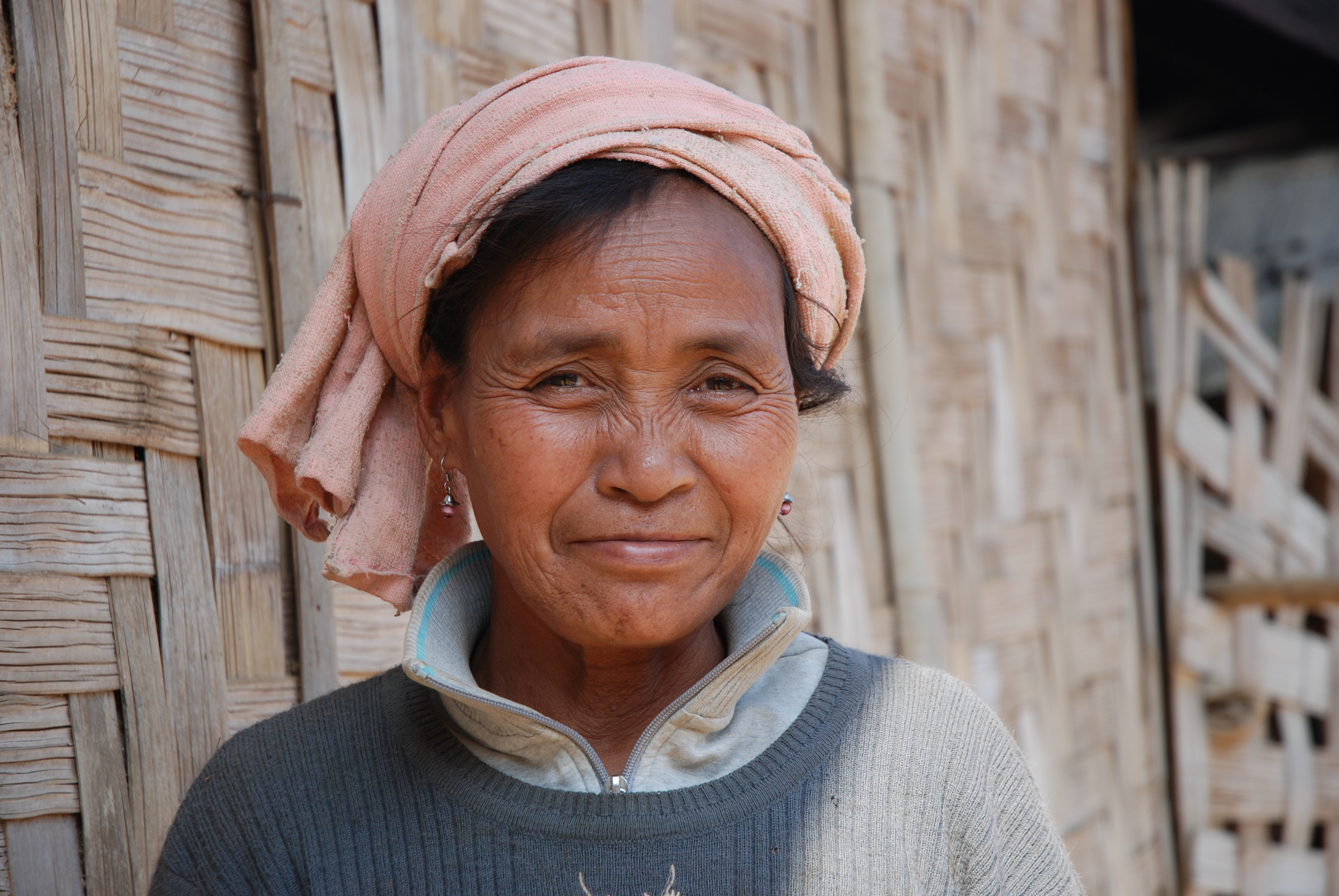
Khmu woman in village Ban Huay fay, region Luang Prabang, Laos

Under the Constitution of Laos, women are legally equal to men. They have the right to vote and to inherit property. In practice, the roles and status of women in Lao society sometimes depend on ethnic affiliation. In some cases, as in the status of Lao Loum women, the youngest daughter is sometimes assigned the task of caring for elderly parents in return for inheritance benefits like land and business.

After receiving her inheritance, the daughter does not obtain direct control over the land or business, as her husband possesses executive power over such matters. Other women from different ethnic groups do not inherit anything. In 1993, the government of Lao established a program of land surveying and titling which was nominally more beneficial to female landholders. National legislation declaring Lao men and women as "equally entitled to hold property" was promulgated, including the Family Law proclaiming that "any property purchased during marriage is regarded as joint property", and that the "land owned by a woman prior to her marriage remains her individual property, as does any land she inherits from her parents”.

== Workforce ==
Some rural women undertake a variety of semi-formal roles in their communities, including handicrafts, commerce, public health, and education, in addition to roles as homemakers and the caretakers of children.

== Religion ==
In connection with Lao Buddhism and traditional beliefs, some women are taught that they can only attain nirvana after they have been reborn as men.

== Education and training ==
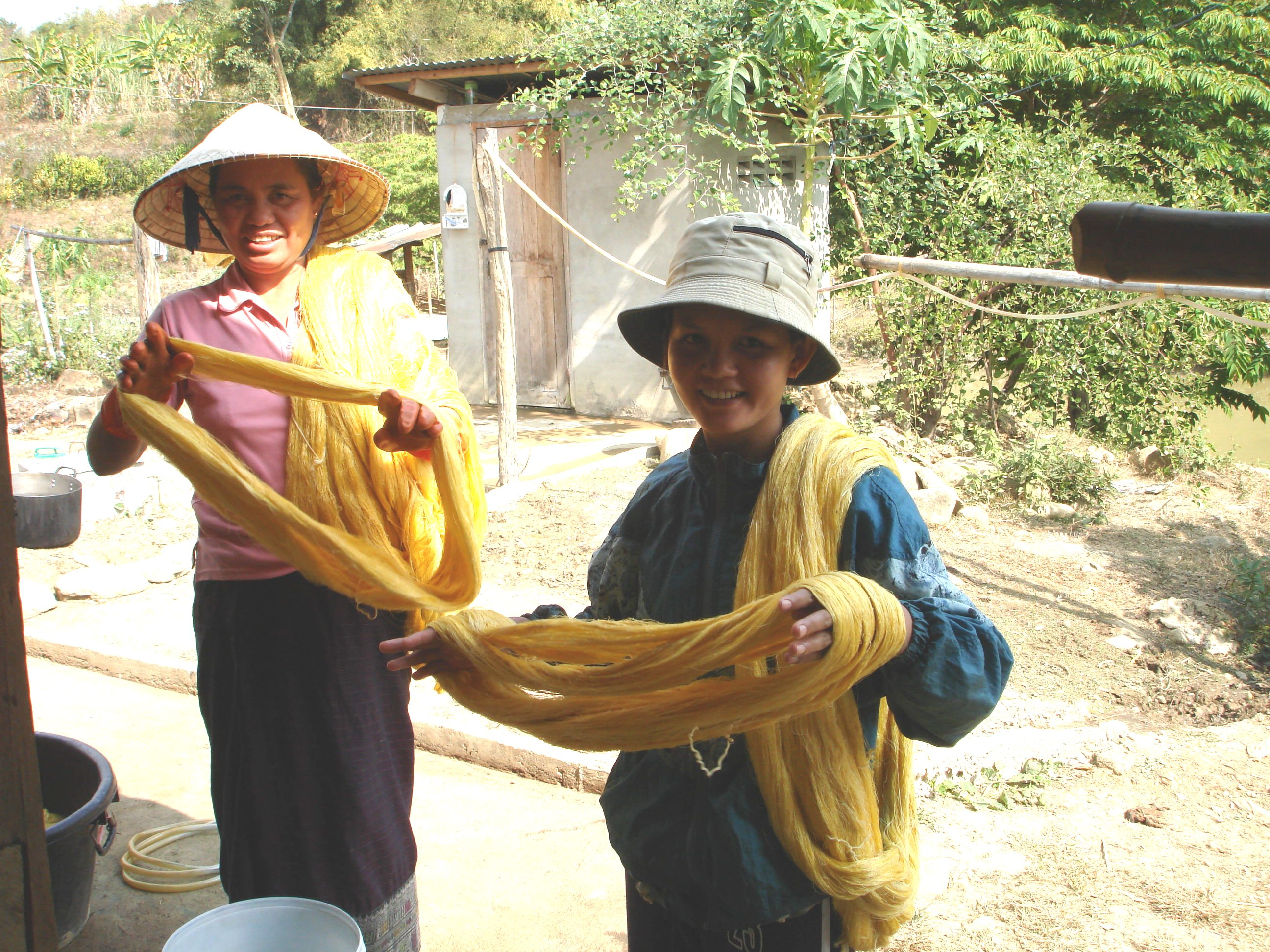
2 women and their silk product.

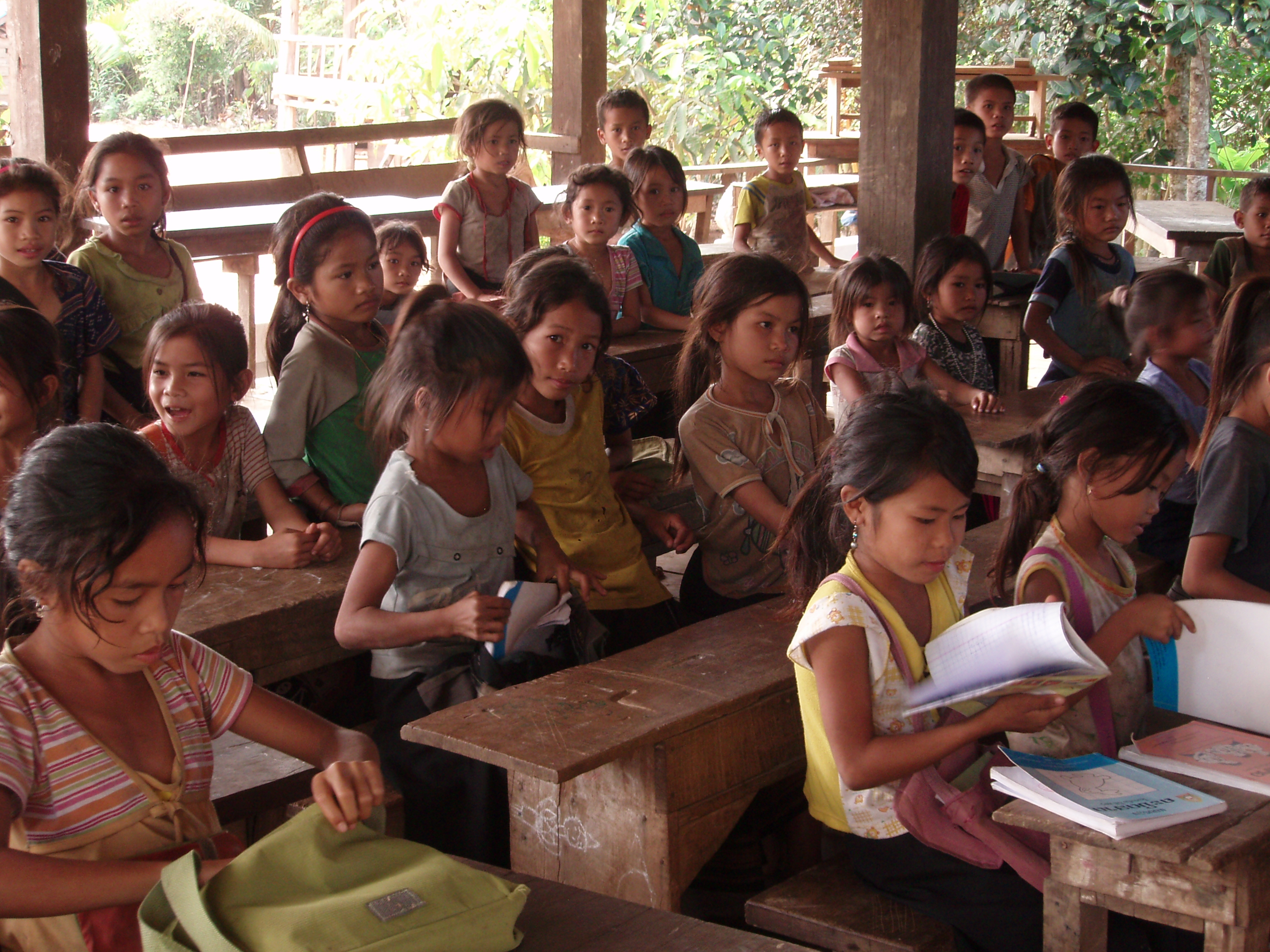
School girls in a village school in a rural area in northern Laos

Fewer Laotian girls enroll in schools than boys. After World War II, some women, such as the silk weavers of the Bai Hai population, became increasingly engaged in unskilled manual labour. 63% of Lao females can read and write, compared to 83% of males.

In decades, women have furthermore benefited from microfinancing programs offered by organizations such as the Social Economic Developers Association (SEDA). In such programs, women receive training in establishing businesses, business management, procurement of materials, mass production, price negotiation for products, financial management, marketing strategies, writing skills, business planning, and decision-making. This is intended to assist women in becoming empowered and obtaining "financial stability".

Another organization involved in women's education is the Lao Disabled Women's Development Centre, an institution that trains handicapped Lao women. The Lao Disabled Women's Development Centre was established by Chanhpheng Sivila, and functioned primarily as a series of workshops before expanding in 2002. Another group focusing on the rights, empowerment, and health of Lao women is the Committee for Women's Advancement of the province of Sayaboury.

== Politics ==
The women of Laos obtained the right to vote and to be elected in 1958.

In 1997, Onechanh Thammavong became 1 of the vice-presidents of the National Assembly of Laos. In March 2011, the National Assembly provided a seminar for 47 female candidates in advance of the 7th Lao general elections in April 2011, in order to instil the “significant duties of the national legislature body” in the women.

== Prostitution and trafficking ==
Human trafficking and prostitution are issues for women.

== See also ==
- Women in Asia
