= Women in the Maldives =

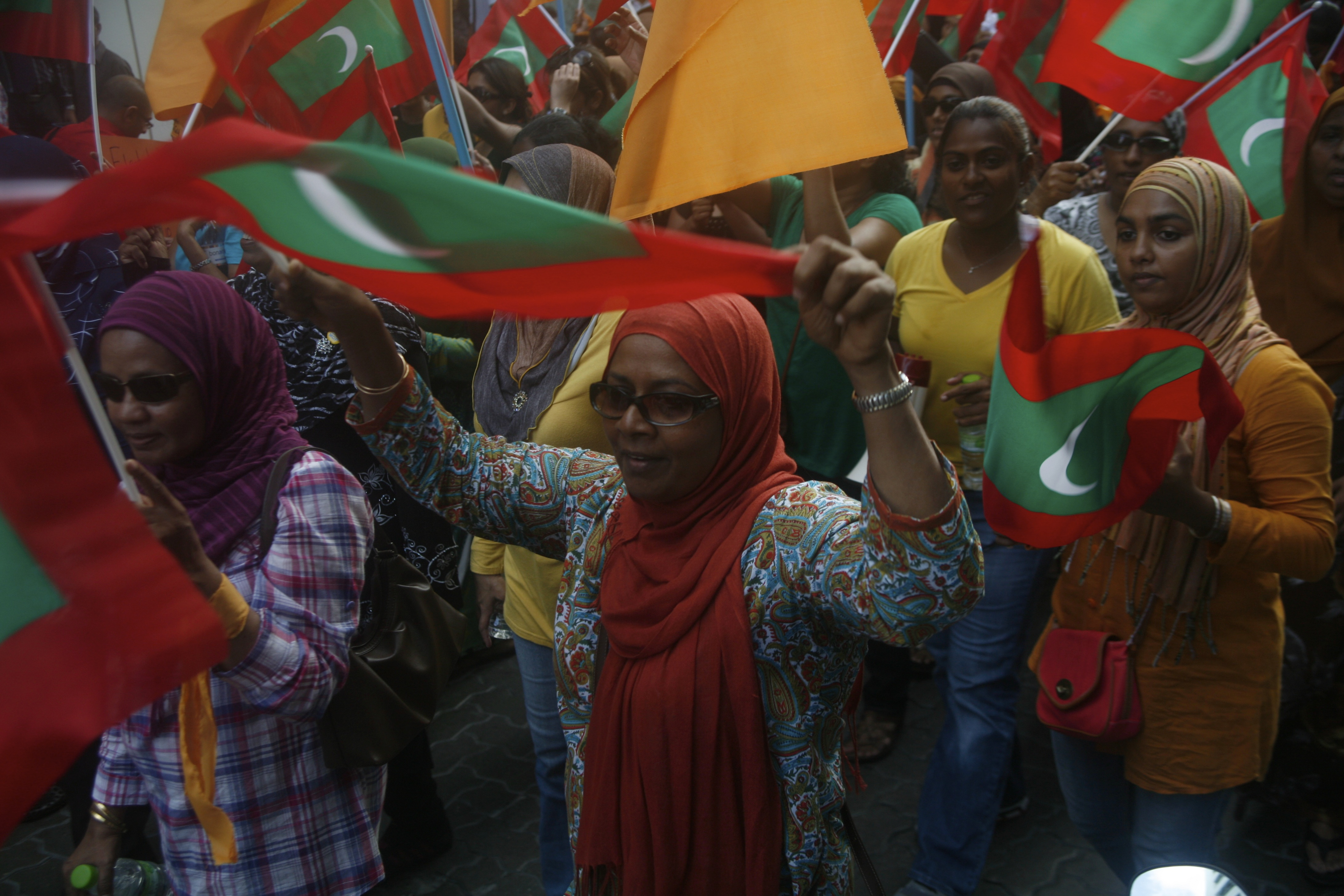
- Maldivian women attending the 2012 International Women's Day March in Malé

General statistics
- Maternal mortality (per 100,000): 60 (2010)
- Women in parliament: 6.5% (2012)
- Women over 25 with secondary education: 20.7% (2010)
- Women in labour force: 55.7% (2011)

Gender Inequality Index
- Value: 0.348 (2021)
- Rank: 83rd out of 191

Global Gender Gap Index
- Value: 0.648 (2022)
- Rank: 117th out of 146

The status of Women in the Maldives was traditionally fairly high, as attested to in part by the existence of four Sultanas.

== Dress rules ==
Although the majority of Maldivian women today wear a veil or what is commonly known as a hijab, this is a recent starting in the mid 2000s, possibly as a response to increased religious awareness.

There are no official laws in the Constitution of the Maldives that require women to cover their heads, but since the early 21st century Maldivian women have commonly worn hijabs and niqabs when in public.

A large portion of the Maldives became Muslim in the 12th century, but it was not yet common for women to cover their heads in hijabs. In 1337, the Muslim traveller Ibn Battuta expressed his dislike of the fact that the Muslim women of the Maldives did not choose to cover their heads and only chose to wear skirts (called feyli) over the lower half of their bodies, and that he had no success in ordering them to cover up. With the exception of a failed attempt to force women to wear hijabs in the 17th century, covering their heads continued to be uncommon among Maldivian women until the 20th century.

From the 1980s onward, the wearing of hijabs started to become more common in the Maldives due to growing Islamic conservatism. In the early 21st century, women and girls were subjected to growing social pressure to veil, resulting in hijabs and black robes becoming common public wear by 2006.

In 2007, the US Department of State's annual International Religious Freedom Report referenced one instance in which a female student was restricted from attending school for wearing a headscarf, despite civil servants wearing them at work without issue; conversely, there are reports of women being pressured into covering themselves by close relatives; of unveiled women being harassed, and of school girls being pressured to cover their heads by their teachers.

Women are not strictly secluded, but special sections are reserved for women in public places in some events. However, those women who refuse to wear a veil or decide to remove it face social stigma from both their families and members of the public.

== Sexual rights ==
Polygamy in the Maldives is legal, but very rare. Prostitution and homosexuality are illegal in the Maldives.

Women do not adopt their husbands' names after marriage but maintain their maiden names. Inheritance of property is through both males and females. With one of the highest divorce rates in the world, women in general have enjoyed marriage and divorce rights throughout history. Both divorced men and women face no stigma, and historically women also have the right to initiate divorce.

Catcalling and sexual harassment are major problems in Maldives for Maldivian and foreign women alike. A total of 96% of women in the Maldives reported having been harassed in the streets at some point in their lives, with 60% facing harassment before turning 16 and 40% reporting being sexually harassed before they turned 10. Men of all ages find catcalling perfectly acceptable in especially Male' city. Little to no action is taken against people who harass women and the number of sexual assaults and rapes are increasing.

In 2013, a 15-year-old rape victim received a sentence of 100 lashes for fornication. The sentence was later overturned by the Maldivian High Court, following an international petition campaign led by Avaaz. A disproportionate number of women face public flogging for extra-marital sex compared to men: the majority of men accused of extra-marital sex are acquitted. (Maldivian law only enforces punishment to these actions only through admission. Even though the Maldives has been a 100 percent Muslim country for nearly a thousand years, there is no record of stoning, or execution for murder unlike most other Islamic or Non-Islamic nations across the world.)

== Education ==
The male female ratio of enrolment and completion of education to secondary school standards remains equivalent, though women consistently have higher enrollment in the government's First Degree Scheme. But on average they earn less than half the salaries of men in the workplace, possibly as a consequence of a higher male education levels a few decades ago. However, with the increased number of females who pursue higher education, which is set to overtake males this is likely to change in the near future. This change is also seen positively in the birth rate, which currently sees the Maldives on a negative birth rate, due to prolonged educational periods and change in social norms.

== Politics ==
In today's society some women hold positions in government and business, but they are heavily under-represented. As of 2016 women only accounted for three out of 14 government ministers, five out of 85 lawmakers and six out of more than 180 judges. However the vast majority of Civil Servants are female employees.

== See also ==
- Women in Asia
