= Women in Singapore =

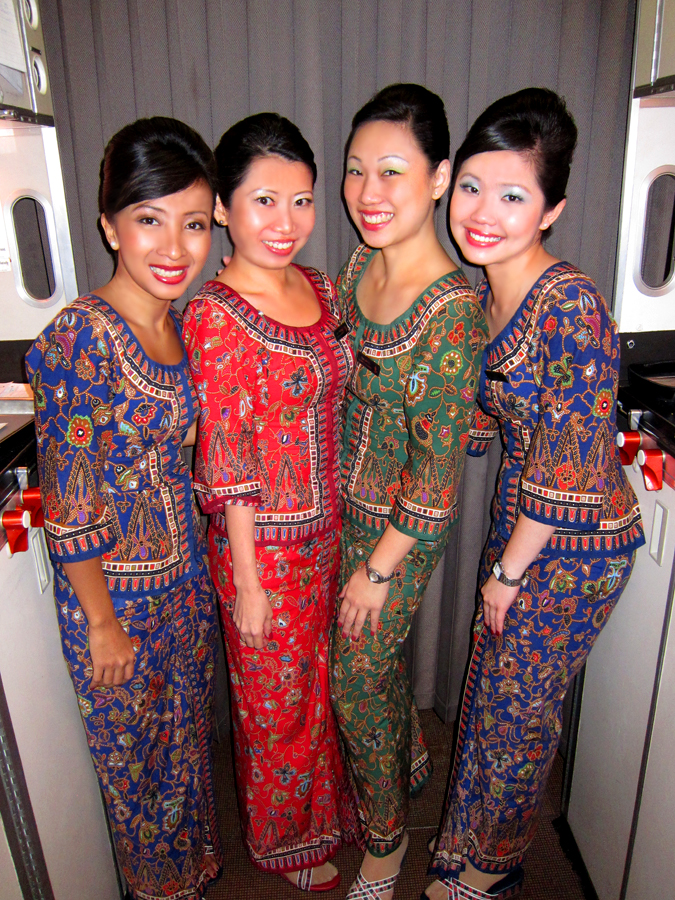
- Singapore Airlines cabin crew

General statistics
- Maternal mortality (per 100,000): 3 (2010)
- Women in parliament: 29.4% (2020)
- Women over 25 with secondary education: 76.6% (2021)
- Women in labour force: 61.2% (2020)

Gender Inequality Index
- Value: 0.040 (2021)
- Rank: 7th out of 191

Global Gender Gap Index
- Value: 0.734 (2022)
- Rank: 49th out of 146

Women in Singapore, particularly those who have joined Singapore's workforce, are faced with balancing their traditional and modern-day roles in Singaporean society and economy.

== Women's rights in Singapore ==
The earliest instance of women's rights in post-independence Singapore was the Women's Charter enacted in 1961.

Until 2007, marital rape was not legally recognised. In 2007, marital rape was recognised under certain circumstances that signalled marriage breakdown. A committee called for the repeal of any kind of marital rape immunity on 9 September 2018. Marital rape has since been completely criminalised under the Criminal Law Reform Act passed on 6 May 2019. The laws came into force on 1 January 2020.

=== White Paper on Singapore Women's Development ===
On 20 September 2020, a virtual dialogue session involving more than 100 participants from youth and women organisations was held. Law and Home Affairs Minister K. Shanmugam announced an initiative that will start in October which will include a series of engagements between the public and private sectors, as well as non-governmental organisations. The aim is to identify and tackle issues concerning women in Singapore. These will culminate in a White Paper to be issued by the Government in the first half of 2021, which will consolidate feedback and recommendations during the sessions, to be called “Conversations on Women Development”. The review was later extended to the second half of 2021 due to high demand.

After almost a year of engagements, on 18 September 2021, Prime Minister Lee Hsien Loong announced that the White Paper will be presented to Parliament in early 2022 with three broad areas to be looked into, being ensuring equal workplace opportunities with legislating anti-discrimination rules and better childcare arrangements, better support for caregivers including a possible enhancement to the Home Caregiving Grant and strengthening protection for women both physically and online. In addition, a garden at Dhoby Ghaut Green will be dedicated to the women of Singapore as part of a proposal accepted from the Singapore Council of Women's Organisations to name public spaces to reflect their contributions.

== Business and politics ==
At present, there is a low presence of female participants in the political arena of Singapore. Females constitute 42% of Singapore's workforce, however, a large portion of this number occupy low-level and low-salary positions. According to the 2011 article Women's Rights Situation in Singapore, these discrepancies can be mainly attributed not to gender discrimination or gender inequality but instead to the women's lower educational qualifications and fewer job experiences than men, the women's focus and dedication to their role in family life, and the paternalistic character and Confucian temperament of Singaporean society.

In relation to entrepreneurship, in 1997 Bloomberg Businessweek stated that businesswomen in Singapore can be grouped into two main categories: the entrepreneur woman who was already able to establish and raise a family, and the businesswoman who sought a substitute to the conventional "career path". An example of a successful Singaporean businesswoman was Catherine Lam, who established the company known as Fabristeel, a manufacturer of steel carts. Before launching Fabristeel in 1979, Lam worked as an accountant for 10 years. Women in Singapore who ventured into running businesses were motivated by "better education, the labor shortage", the encouragement to achieve entrepreneurial success, and the resulting "flexible lifestyle" while doing business-related roles.

Another example is Lim Soo Hoon, who was Singapore's Woman of the Year in 1997. Lim was the first female Permanent Secretary of Singapore who worked for the Public Service Division of the office of the Prime Minister of Singapore. Lim held positions at Singapore's Ministry of Trade and Industry, then later into jobs in Singapore's Ministry of Transport, and then in the Ministry of Manpower, and Ministry of Community Development, Youth and Sports.

== Sexuality ==
With regard to sexuality, BBC News reported in 2001 that Singaporean women have a more open attitude about sexual intimacy in Asia. The study reflected that 18% of the Singaporean women interviewed are "most likely to initiate" sexual activity with their personal and intimate partners. This is usually met with mixed opinion, as in the case of the example in 2009 when Dr Eng Kai Er walked through Holland Village naked with Swedish exchange student Jan Phillip and was fined S$2,000 with a warning issued by the Agency for Science, Technology and Research which sponsored her undergraduate studies.

During the 2000s, 2-3 out of every 10 unfaithful couple members were women. Former decades, like 1980s and 1990s, adulterous women were rare. During the 2010s decade, the statistics changed, being women half the times.

During the 2010s, there was a trend among 50s and 60s years olds women getting divorced. Most of them claimed they grew tired of their husband's infidelities.

== See also ==
- Women in Singapore politics
- Singapore women's national rugby union team
- Women's Charter
- Singaporean women's participation in politics
- Singapore women's national football team
- Singapore national women's cricket team
- Women in Asia
