= Human trafficking in Macau =

In 2010, the Macau Special Administrative Region (MSAR) of the People’s Republic of China was primarily a destination, and to a much lesser extent, a source territory for women and children subjected to trafficking in persons, specifically commercial sexual exploitation. Victims were primarily from mainland China, Mongolia, Russia, and Southeast Asia, with many of them from inland Chinese provinces who travel to the border province of Guangdong in search of better employment. There, they fell prey to false advertisements for jobs in casinos and other legitimate employment in Macau, but upon arrival, they are forced into prostitution. Foreign and mainland Chinese women were sometimes passed to local organized crime groups upon arrival, held captive, and forced into sexual servitude. Chinese, Russian, and Thai criminal syndicates were believed to sometimes be involved in bringing women into Macau’s commercial sex industry. Victims were sometimes confined in massage parlors and illegal brothels, where they were closely monitored, forced to work long hours, have their identity documents confiscated, and threatened with violence; all factors that made it particularly difficult for them to seek help. Macau was a source territory for women and girls who were subjected to forced prostitution elsewhere in Asia.

In 2010 the MSAR did not fully comply with the minimum standards for the elimination of trafficking; however, it made significant efforts to do so. The government continued efforts to raise awareness about trafficking amongst officials and the general public. Authorities convicted one trafficking offender during 2009. However, authorities identified far fewer victims during 2009 than in the previous year and victim identification and protection efforts need to be further improved. Macau had the resources and government infrastructure to make greater strides in combating trafficking.

The country ratified the 2000 UN TIP Protocol in February 2010.

The U.S. State Department's Office to Monitor and Combat Trafficking in Persons placed the territory in "Tier 2 Watchlist" in 2017. The U.S. report of 2023 placed Macau at Tier 3, while noting that China was one of eleven countries which were seen as having a documented government policy or pattern of human trafficking.

== Sex trafficking ==
Sex trafficking in Macau is an issue. Macau and foreign women and girls are forced into prostitution in brothels, homes, and businesses in the city.

== Prosecution (2010) ==
Macau’s 2008 anti-trafficking legislation prohibits all forms of trafficking in persons and prescribes penalties that are sufficiently stringent and commensurate with those prescribed for other serious crimes. During the reporting period, authorities investigated six new trafficking cases. There were no cases of joint investigations between Macau authorities and foreign governments during the reporting period. In one ongoing investigation, law enforcement officials arrested six individuals who appeared to have been running a trafficking operation for over a decade. The syndicate was believed to have lured women to Macau by promising them jobs in massage parlors, and subsequently forcing them into prostitution upon arrival in the territory. Many cases investigated in 2008 were closed due to lack of evidence. In November 2009, Macau prosecutors convicted their first trafficking offender under the anti-trafficking law. A local man was sentenced to over seven years’ imprisonment for his role in the trafficking of two female Macau residents to Japan in 2008. Corruption remains a serious problem in Macau, often linked to the gambling industry and organized crime networks. There were no reports of trafficking complicity by Macau officials during the reporting period One Macau police officer arrested in 2008 for allegedly blackmailing two women in prostitution for ‘protection’ fees has still not been brought to trial. The involvement of international criminal syndicates in trafficking likely continued to challenge Macau’s law enforcement efforts.

== Protection (2010) ==
Macau authorities demonstrated limited progress in its efforts to protect trafficking victims, particularly in the proactive identification of trafficking victims. Authorities identified six sex trafficking victims during the reporting period, a significant decrease from the 23 victims identified during the previous reporting period. Four victims were from mainland China, one from Vietnam, and one from Mongolia. Three victims stayed at a government shelter, and the other victims were repatriated to their home country at their request. Macau authorities proactively identified two of the six victims. The government did not report any efforts to identify trafficking cases amongst the more than 1,600 migrant workers who filed labor complaints in 2009. Victims identified by Macau authorities received counseling, medical care, and financial stipends while in the government shelter, but foreign victims are not offered legal alternatives to their removal to countries where they may face hardship or retribution. The government sustained an existing partnership with a local NGO in order to identify interpreters who could assist in cases involving foreign victims. The government should further improve efforts to proactively identify trafficking victims among individuals deported for immigration violations, including women in prostitution. The Women’s General Association of Macau continued to receive government funding to run a 24-hour trafficking victim assistance hotline. In November 2009, the government reached out to an international organization and funded a gathering of international experts in Macau to train 70 police, immigration, and social welfare officers on victim identification and protection. Macau officials also participated in regional anti-trafficking training run by a foreign donor.

== Prevention (2010) ==
The MSAR government continued some efforts to prevent trafficking in persons during the reporting period. The government continued to display anti-trafficking brochures and posters in multiple languages at border checkpoints, hospitals, and popular public gathering areas. The Health Bureau installed television terminals to broadcast an MTV-produced trafficking video and local public service announcements on trafficking to be shown at health centers frequented by foreign workers. Authorities partnered with a local NGO to print 2,000 booklets featuring 55 anti-trafficking poster entries by secondary school students submitted for a recent NGO contest. The government did not take measures during the year to reduce the demand for commercial sex acts or conduct any awareness efforts targeting clients of Macau’s prostitution industry.

== See also ==
- Human rights in Macau
- Crime in Macau
