= Prostitution in the Maldives =

Prostitution is illegal in Maldives, but occurs on a small scale. A 2014 survey by the Human Rights Commission of the Maldives (HRCM) estimated there were 1,139 female prostitutes on the islands. Some women enter the country posing as tourists but then engage in sex work.

Sex trafficking and child prostitution are problems in the country.

== Closure of spas ==
Following complaints that sexual services were being offered in spas in hotels, and a protest in the capital, Malé, by the opposition Adhaalath Party, the government ordered the closure of the spas in 1,000 hotels in late December 2011. Following pressure from the country's tourism industry, president Mohamed Nasheed lifted the ban a few days later.

== Child prostitution ==
Child prostitution is a problem in the country, especially in Malé and in the Laamu Atoll region. According to Psychologist Dr Aishath Ali Naaz, it is so common in some areas that its regarded as 'normal'. Often the prostitution is arranged by family members.

The HRCM estimate 8% of female prostitutes on the island are underage.

== Legal situation ==
Article 88(a) of the Maldivian Penal Code 1967 includes Sharia Law into the country's legislation. Sex outside marriage is outlawed under Sharia Law, as are other forms of immorality, therefore prostitution is forbidden.

Public order and immigration laws are also used against sex workers. Foreigners who engage in prostitution can expect to be deported and Maldivians can expect a prison sentence.

Whilst condoms are allowed to be sold in local pharmacies, they are usually not displayed publicly and citizens are typically very discreet during a purchase. Condoms and lubricants are sometimes confiscated by the police and used as evidence of prostitution.

== Sex trafficking ==
The Maldives are a destination country for women, and children subjected to sex trafficking, and a source country for women and children subjected to sex trafficking. A small number of women from Asia, Central Asia, and Eastern Europe, as well as girls from Bangladesh and Maldives, are subjected to sex trafficking in the Maldives. Maldivian women may be subjected to sex trafficking in Sri Lanka.

A Thai hotelier reported in 2013 that Thai women were being recruited with offers for good jobs in the Maldives, but on arrival being forced into prostitution.

The Prevention of Human Trafficking Act (PHTA) criminalises some, but not all forms, of sex trafficking. For the first time, in 2016, the government secured a conviction under the PHTA. Three foreign nationals were each sentenced to 10 years imprisonment in a sex trafficking case.

In November 2016, the Sri Lanka Foreign Employment Bureau (SLFEB) arrested 2 men in connection with trafficking Sri Lankan women to the Maldives, where they worked in brothels. More than 100 women were thought to be involved. A Maldivian man was also being sought.

The United States Department of State Office to Monitor and Combat Trafficking in Persons ranks the Maldives as a 'Tier 2 Watch List' country.
