= Polygamy in the Maldives =

Polygyny

Polygamous unions, specifically polygynous unions, are legal in the island nation of the Maldives, though such unions have been reported to be uncommon. Fifty-nine polygamous marriages took place in 1998. Polygamy is also specifically covered by a 2001 Maldivian law, which orders courts to assess a man's finances before letting him take another wife.

The Family Act allows men to marry up to four wives but states that polygamy must be approved by the Registrar of Marriage, based on the man's financial ability to provide for his proposed family; in 2012, this required MVR 15,000. In 2022, minimum wage was MVR 5,265 per month. However, it was reported in 2020 that there were many unregistered polygamous marriages outside the capital.

It was noted at the start of the 21st century that about one in 11 men had a polygamous marriage. It was still uncommon in later years, with less than 200 marriages recorded in 2018.
