= Rural society in Laos =

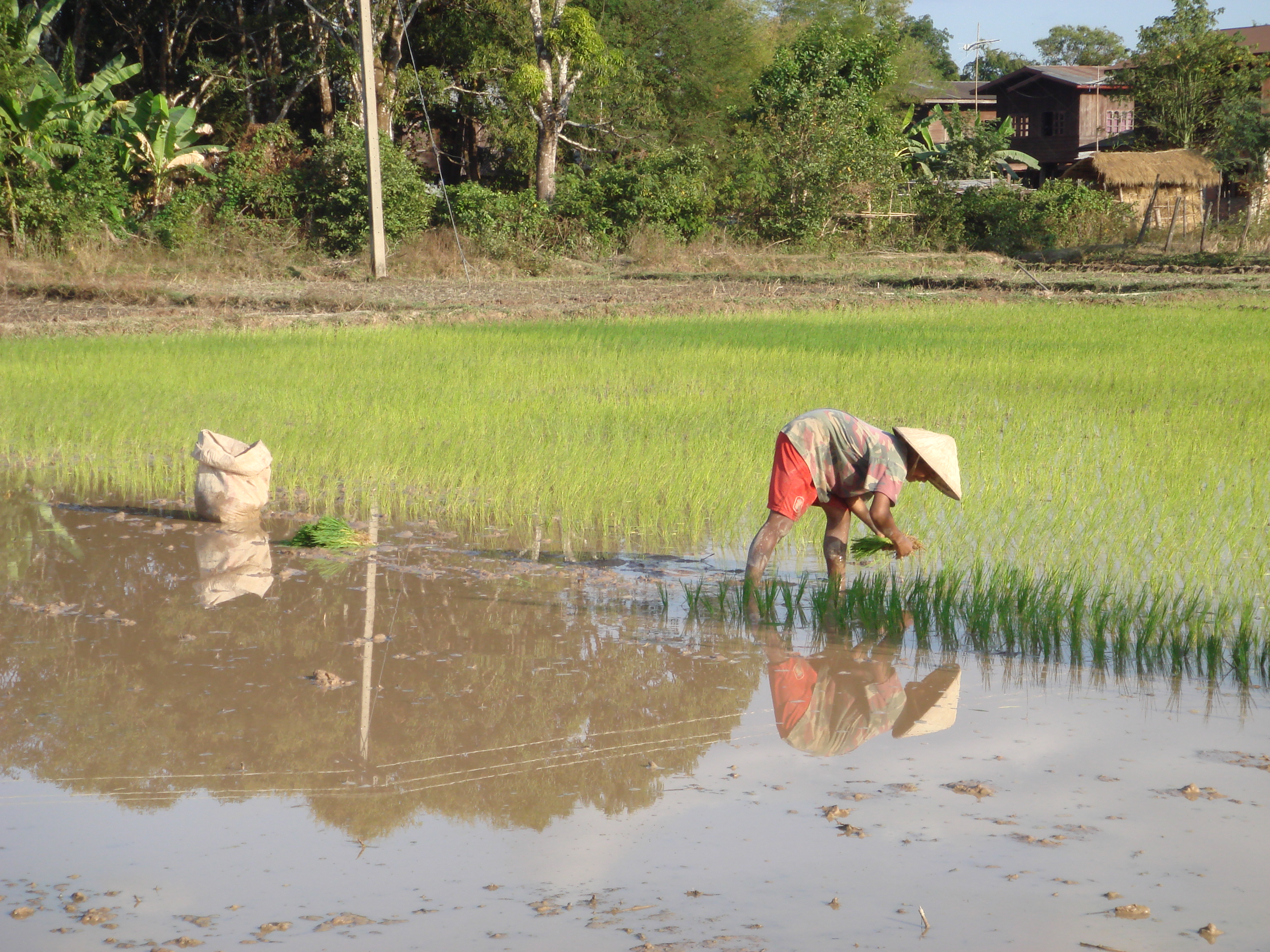
Rice planting near Champasak Province

In Laos, there are rural villages engaged in subsistence agricultural production. Rural trade networks have been a part of life since the 1950s. Except near the larger towns and in agricultural plains of Vientiane and Savannakhét, villages are spaced at least kilometers apart and the intervening land variously developed as rice paddy and swidden fields or maintained as buffer forest for gathering wild plants and animals, fuelwood, and timber harvest.

Ethnic, geographic, and ecological differences create variations in the pattern of village life. Ethnic mixing has resulted from groups migrating to a new settlement site at about the same time, or a larger village at a crossroads or river transit point developing into a trading center. Some minority Laotian individuals have adopted lowland behavior and dress patterns, and have acculturated to lowland society. In some units, military service has also brought together ethnic groups.
