= Sex trafficking in Macau =

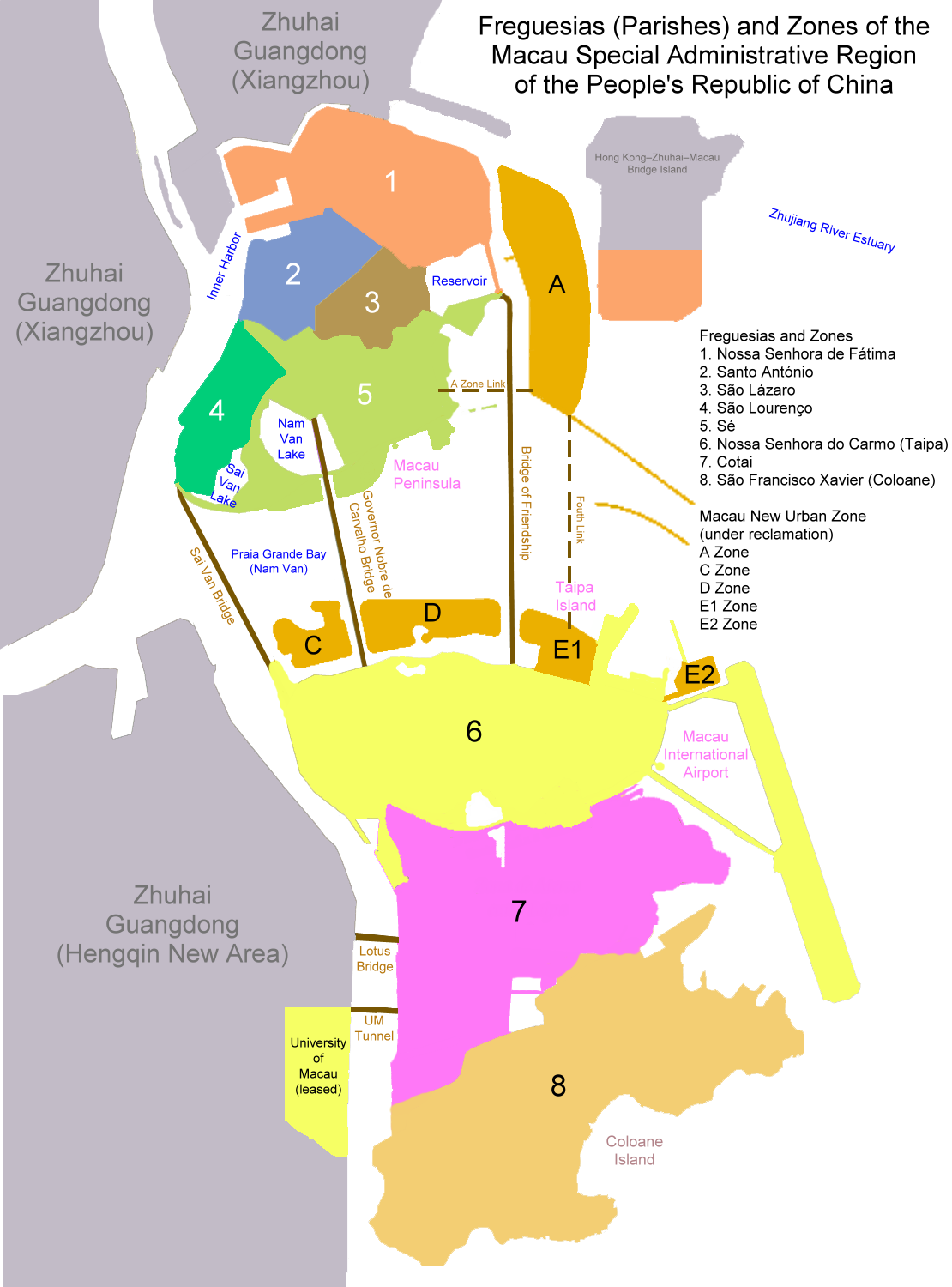
Macau citizen and foreign victims are sex trafficked into and out of the municipalities and parishes of Macau. They are raped and physically and psychologically harmed in brothels, homes, and businesses within these administrative divisions.

Sex trafficking in Macau is human trafficking for the purpose of sexual exploitation and slavery that occurs in the Macao Special Administrative Region of the People's Republic of China. Macau is predominantly a destination country for sexually trafficked persons.

Sex trafficking victims, primarily women and girls, in the city are Macau people, Mainland Chinese, and foreigners. Migrants, foreign workers, children, and people in poverty are vulnerable. Sex trafficked victims are deceived, threatened, and forced into prostitution and unfree labour. Their documents, including passports, are often confiscated and they are tied, locked-up, and or guarded. Victims experience physical and psychological trauma. They contract sexually transmitted diseases from rapes, and abuse, malnutrition, and poor living conditions are common. Cybersex or online sex trafficking and victims being in pornography and live video sharing is a significant problem. Traffickers lure victims with different internet and social media sites and apps, as well as email.

Sex trafficking and exploitation have permeated all levels of Macau society. Traffickers come from all social and economic classes. A number of traffickers are members of or facilitated by criminal syndicates. Sex trafficking is linked to the casino industry. Women, promised modeling contracts, have been sold into sexual slavery.

The scale of sex trafficking in Macau is not known because of the absence of data, the underground nature of sex trafficking crimes, the fact that only a small minority of cases are reported to the authorities, and other factors. The government of Macau has been criticized for its insufficient anti-sex trafficking efforts and poor victim protections.

== Non-governmental organizations ==
The Good Shepherd Asia Pacific conducts anti-sex trafficking efforts and victim rehabilitation services in Macau.
