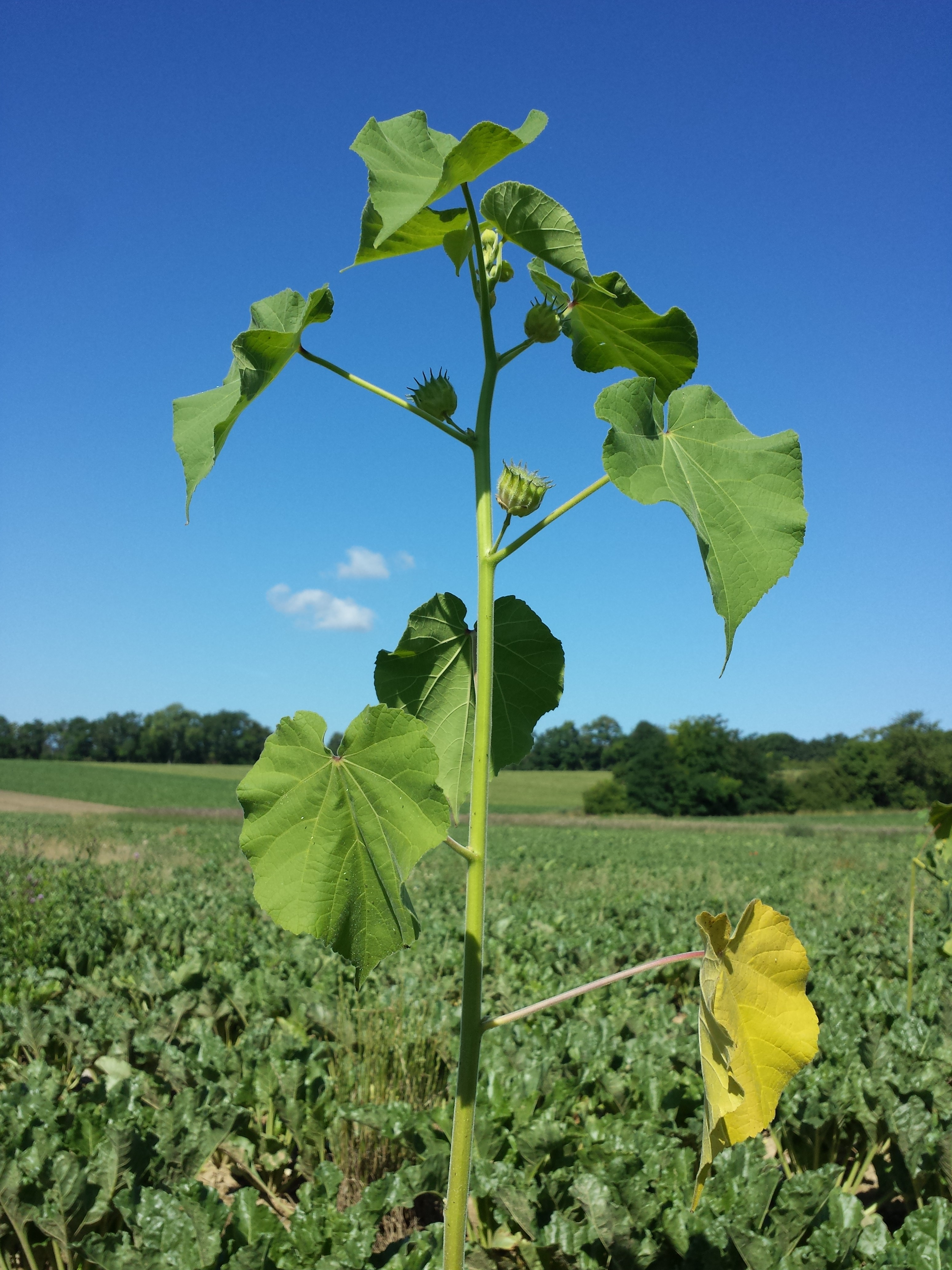
- Abutilon theophrasti

Scientific classification
- Kingdom: Plantae
- Clade: Embryophytes
- Clade: Tracheophytes
- Clade: Angiosperms
- Clade: Eudicots
- Clade: Rosids
- Order: Malvales
- Family: Malvaceae
- Genus: Abutilon
- Species: A. theophrasti

Binomial name
- Abutilon theophrasti Medik.

Synonyms
- List: Abutilon abutilon (L.) Huth; Abutilon avicennae Gaertn.; Abutilon avicennae var. genuina Regel; Abutilon avicennae f. genuina Skvortsov; Abutilon behrianum F.Muell.; Abutilon commune Oken; Abutilon pubescens Moench; Abutilon tiliifolium (Willd.) Sweet; Malva abutilon (L.) E.H.L.Krause; Sida abutilifolia Moench ex Steud.; Sida abutilon L.; Side abutila St.-Lag.; Sida tenax Salisb.; Sida tiliifolia Willd.

= Abutilon theophrasti =

Plant species in the mallow family

Abutilon theophrasti, also known as velvetleaf, velvet plant, velvetweed and the Chinese jute, is an annual plant in the family Malvaceae that is native to Central and East Asia. It is the type species of the genus Abutilon. Its specific epithet, theophrasti, commemorates the ancient Greek botanist-philosopher Theophrastus.

== Description ==
Velvetleaf grows 3–8 feet tall on branched, stout stems covered in downy hairs. The annual plant grows during the warmer seasons, germinating in the spring and flowering in the summer. Velvetleaf's leaves are large and heart-shaped with pointed tips at their ends, which grow alternately at different points along the length of the stem. The leaves are attached to thick, long stems, and when crushed, release an odor.

The plant's flowers are yellow and grow up to an inch in diameter, with five petals attached at the base. Flowers grow on stalks and can either be found in clusters or individually where the stalk meets the leaf stem.

Pod-like capsules produced by the plant consist of 12-15 wood segments that form cup-like rings. Through the maturation of the seeds, the segments remain joined, and upon maturation, the mature seeds are released through vertical slits on the outside of the capsule.

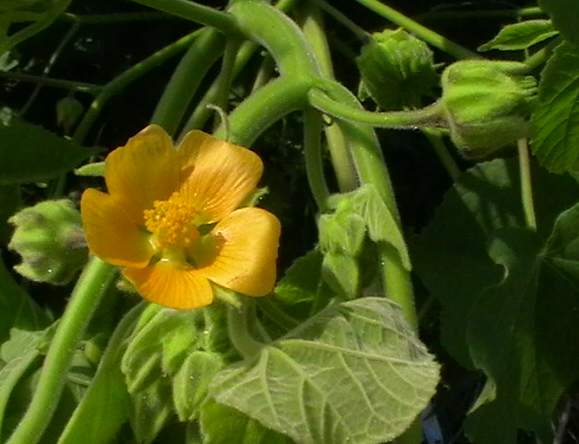
Flower and leaves

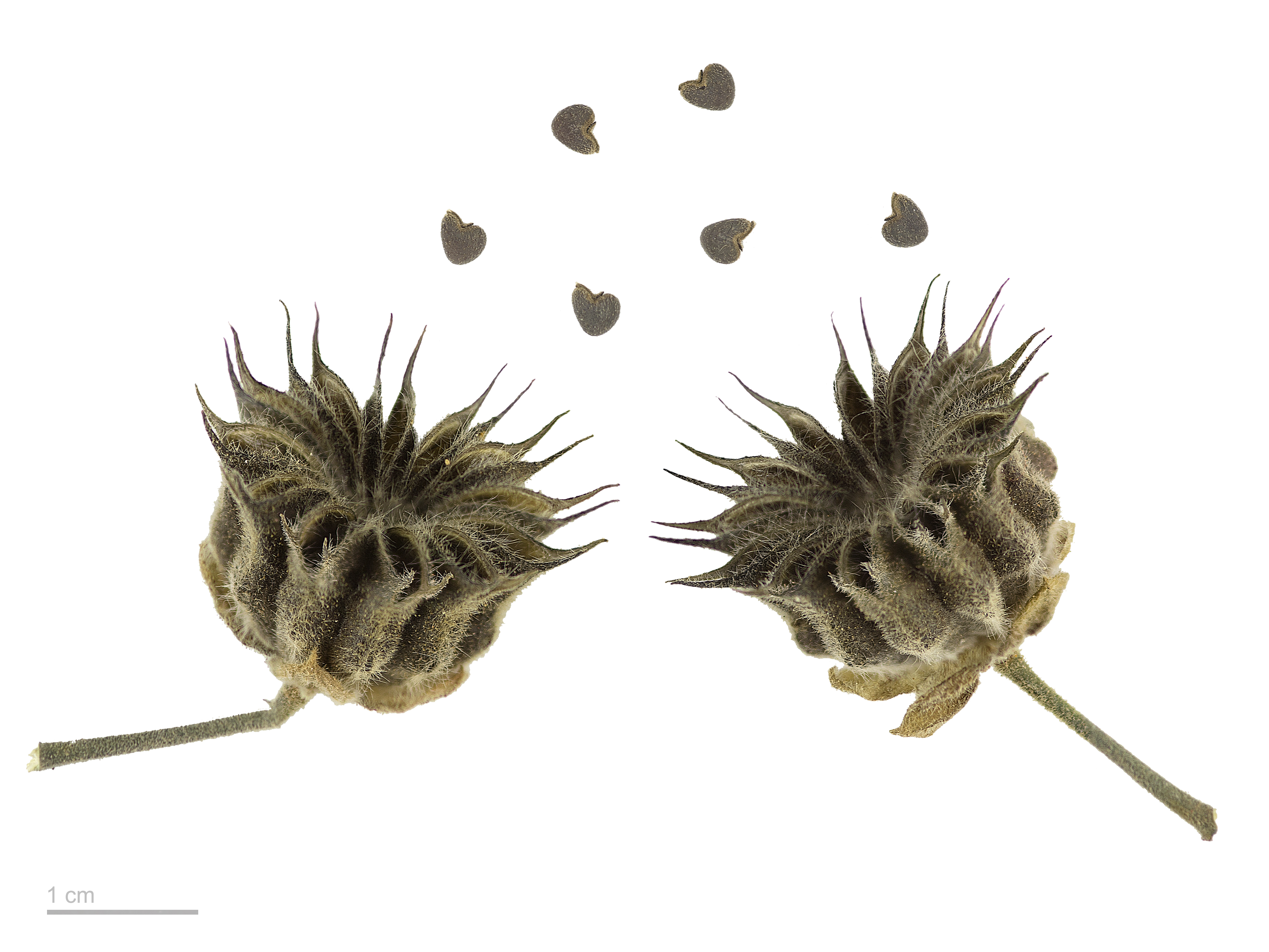
Abutilon theophrasti - MHNT

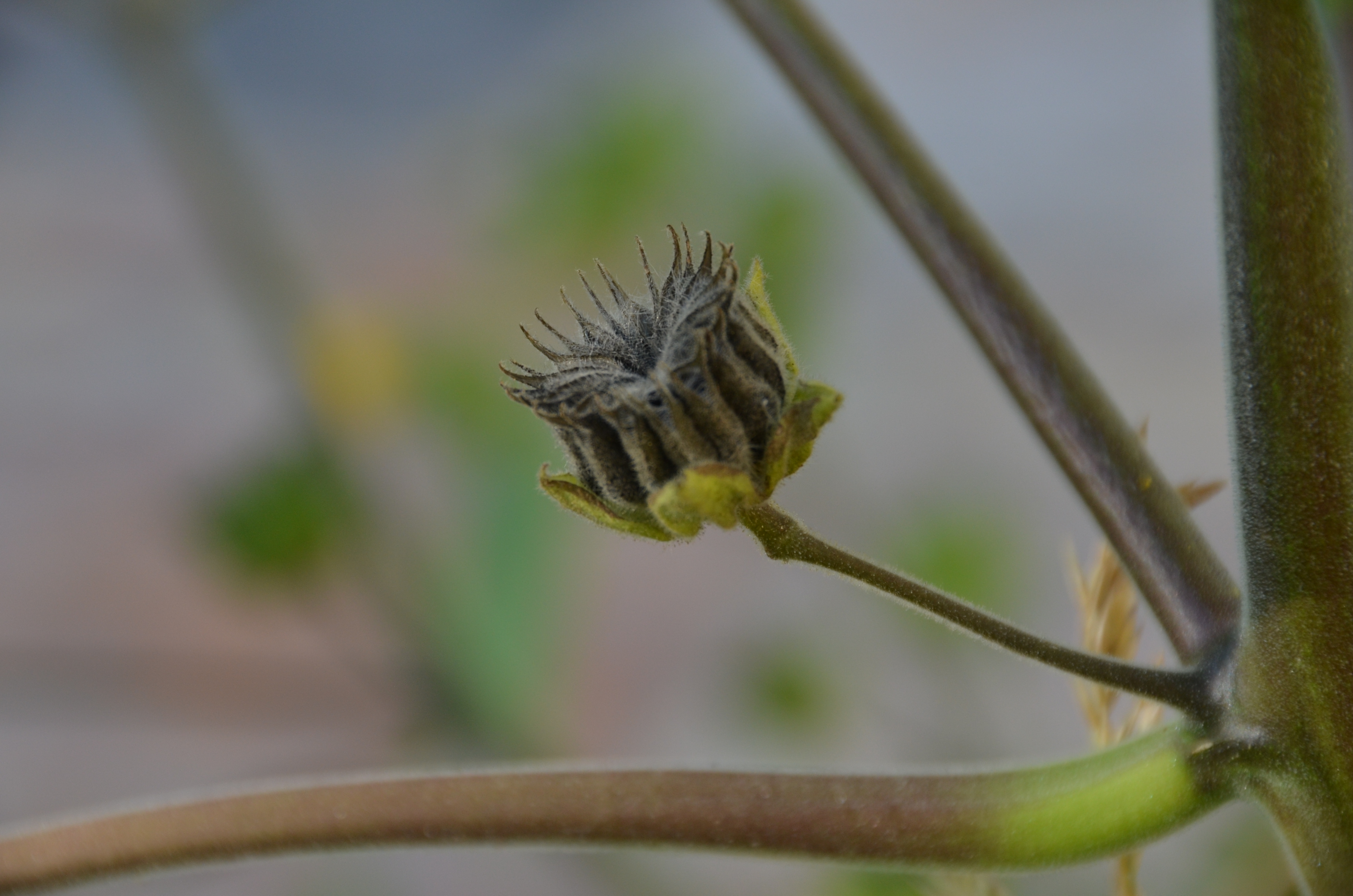
Schizocarp on a plant that grew in California.

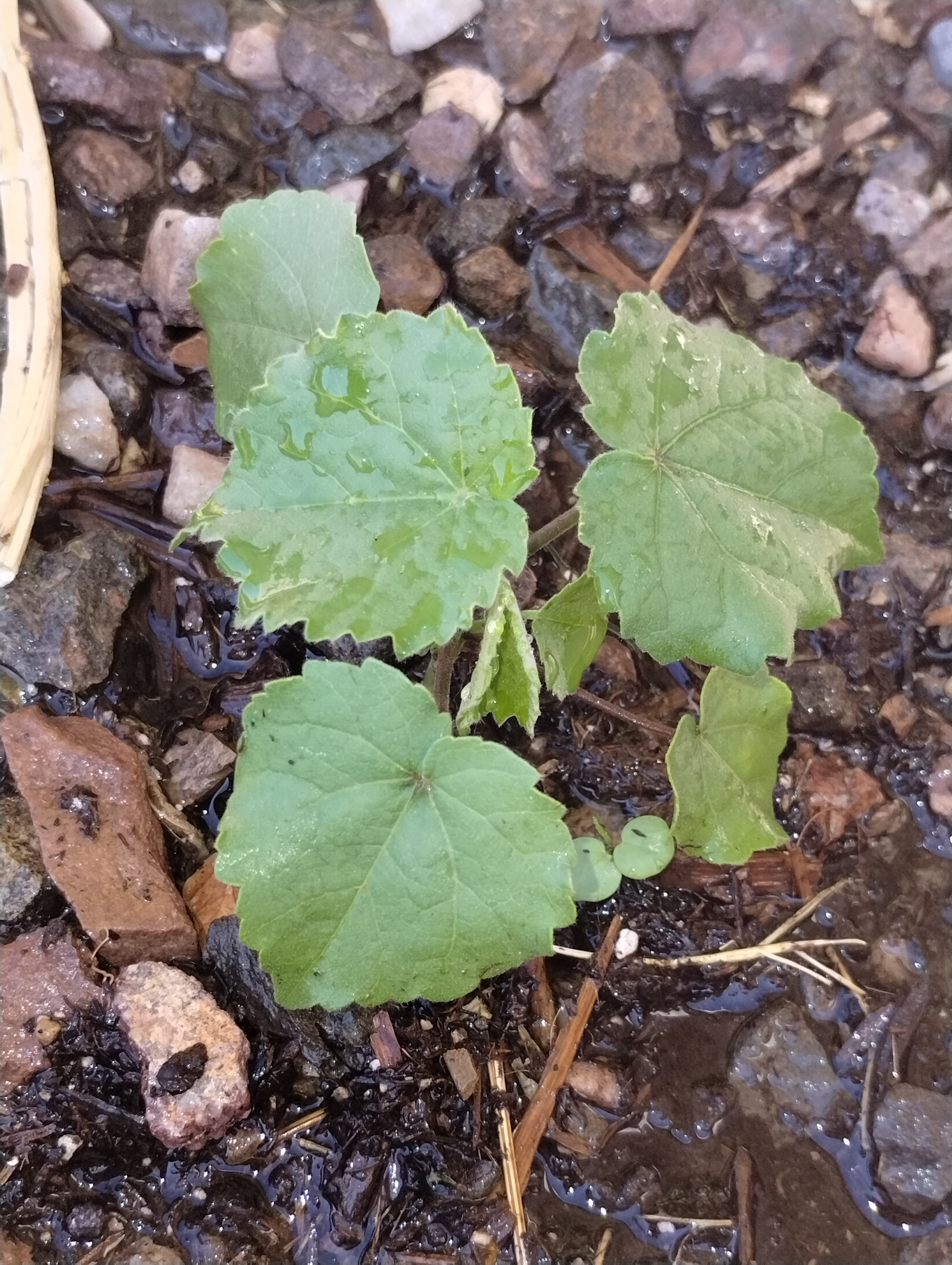
Seedling

== Biology ==
=== Reproduction ===
During reproduction, the plant generates a number of seeds ranging between 700 and 44,200 units per plant. The seeds take 17–22 days to mature once pollinated. Seeds can last for about 50 years when stored in a dry location or in the soil. In order to disperse the seeds for reproduction, each carpel in the plant is opened with a vertical slit along the outer edge. For successful germination of the seeds, the temperature must range between 24 and 30 °C. Velvet plants are able to grow in various types of soil, from gray-brown podzols and sandy to clay loams with an ideal soil pH range between 6.1 and 7.8, depending on location.

== Cultivation and medicinal uses ==
Velvetleaf has been grown in China since around 2000 BCE for its strong, jute-like bast fibre. The plant is known as maabulha in the Maldives and its leaves were part of the traditional Maldivian cuisine, usually finely chopped and mixed with Maldives fish and grated coconut in a dish known as mas huni. The seeds are eaten in China and Kashmir. The plant is also used to make ropes, coarse cloth, nets, paper, and caulk for boats, and is still cultivated in China to this day. Velvetleaf is used in Chinese traditional medicine as a treatment for dysentery and to treat eye injuries, including opacity of the cornea. The leaves of the velvet leaf contain 0.01% of rutin and are used for a soothing, lubricant treatment that softens irritated tissues. When the leaves are softened, they can be used as a remedy for ulcers. The bark of velvetleaf can reduce the flow of bodily fluids such as blood, secretions, and mucus, and promote the flow of urine.

== Invasive species ==
In the midwestern and northeastern regions of the US, eastern Canada, and the Eastern Mediterranean, A. theophrasti is considered a damaging weed to agricultural crops, especially corn and soybeans. It is also listed as an unwanted organism in New Zealand and in several countries in Europe and by the EU, especially in Central Europe due to its invasive nature.

Since being introduced to North America in the 18th century, velvetleaf has become an invasive species in agricultural regions of the eastern and midwestern United States. It is one of the most detrimental weeds to corn, causing decreases of up to 34% of crop yield if not controlled and costing hundreds of millions of dollars per year in control and damage. Velvetleaf is an extremely competitive plant, so much so that it can steal nutrients and water from crops. Because of the season it germinates in, the plant matures right before the fall harvest on farms.

Velvetleaf is a tall plant that can cause the shorter crops around it to not thrive by severely reducing light penetration into them. Not only does it affect crop plants by starving them of light, but it also houses different diseases and pests of crops like corn, cotton, soybeans, and others. Examples of pests and diseases that velvetleaf harbors are maize pests, tobacco pests, and soybean diseases.

When destroyed, the plant releases a chemical odor that is also known to be harmful to surrounding crops when released into the soil by inhibiting the germination of crop seeds. In order to eradicate velvetleaf, individual plants should be dug up or pulled out manually and not tilled or plowed to avoid seed germination. The plant can also be mowed while it is still small.

Velvetleaf can be controlled by herbicides. As an early emerging weed, farmer, care needs to be taken when applying post-emergence herbicides, to avoid waiting until after plants have exceeded the maximum post-emergence height. Additional methods of control include crop rotation and delaying fall tillage to prevent seeds from entering the seed bank.

This species is typically found in areas where the soil has been disturbed. This causes the dormant seeds in the soil, which can persist for up to fifty years, to be brought closer to the surface, allowing for growth when the soil is at an optimally warm temperature.

== Threats to A. theophrasti ==
Different predators and pathogens affect velvetleaf at different life stages of the plant. Examples of threats include but are not limited to:

Organism of Harm	Type of Threat	Effect on A. theophrasti
Verticillium dahliae	Wilt pathogen	Necrosis of leaves Reduces seed production
Helicoverpa zea	Insect	Reduces seed production
Heliothis virescens	Insect	Reduces seed production
Liorhyssus hyalinus	Insect	Reduces seed production
Niesthrea louisianica	Insect	Reduces seed production
Althaeus folkertsi	Insect	Reduces seed production
Phomopsis longicolla	Pathogen	Red-brown lesions on lower stem and root area growing in soybean fields
Turnip mosaic virus	Pathogen	Causes severe mosaic symptoms
Peromyscus maniculatus	Rodent	Reduces seed production through consumption
Peromyscus leucopus	Rodent	Reduces seed production through consumption
