= Maldivian cuisine =

Culinary traditions of the Maldives

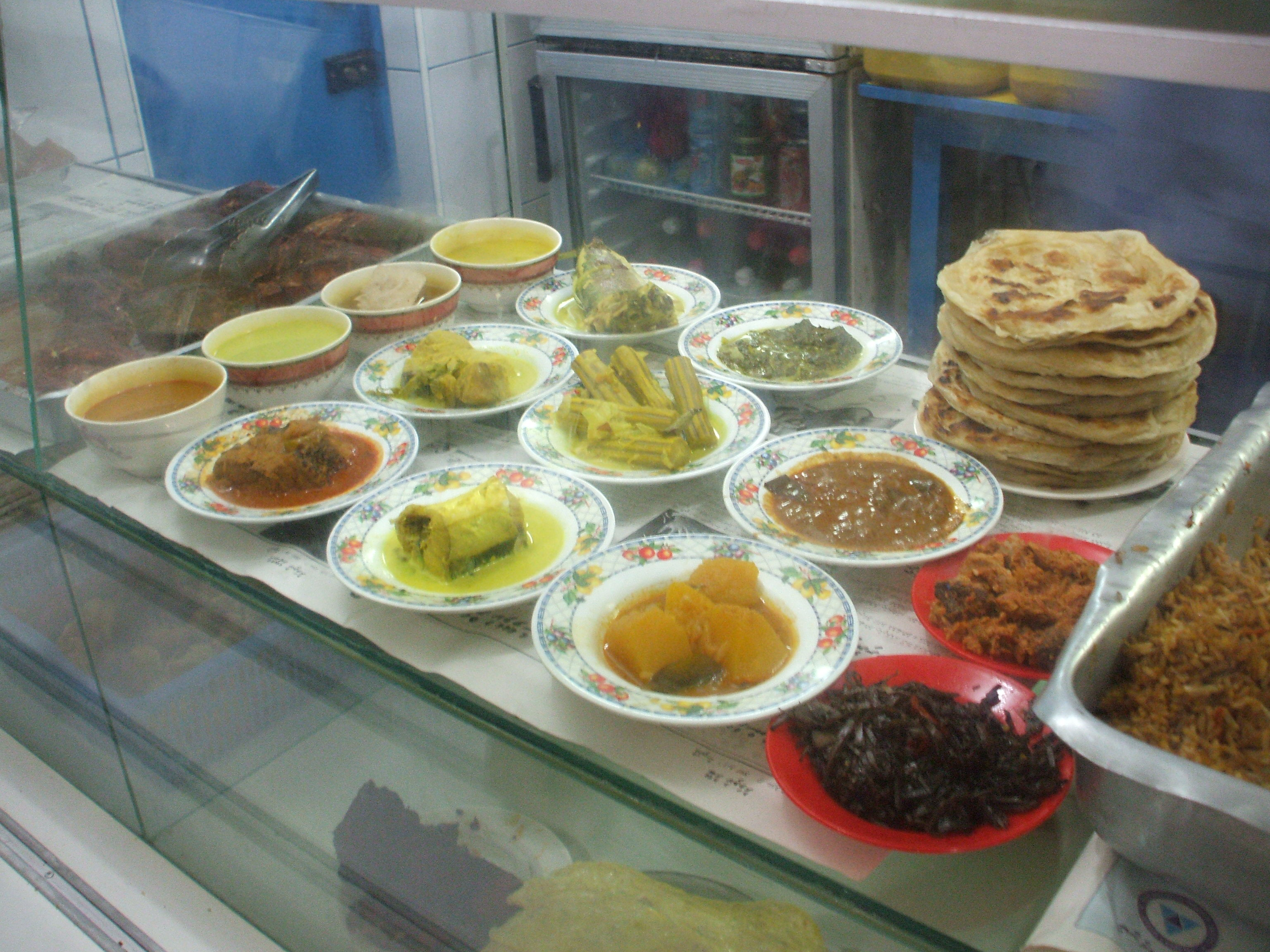
Different curries of the Maldives and farata (parotha bread)

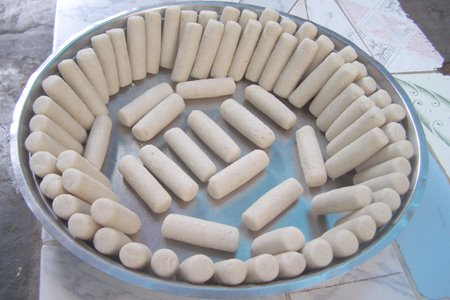
Bonda (bondi) a deep-fried potato snack from Minicoy, India

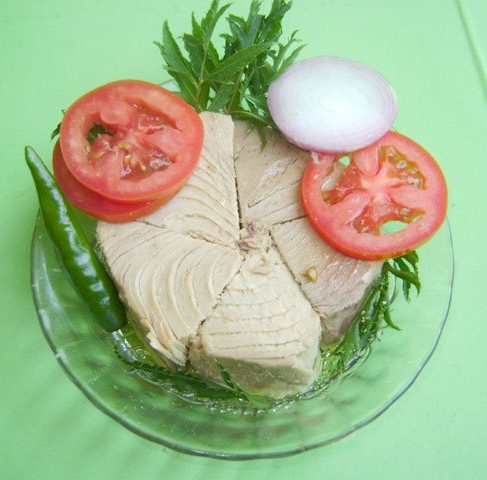
Tuna, one of the essential ingredients in many dishes

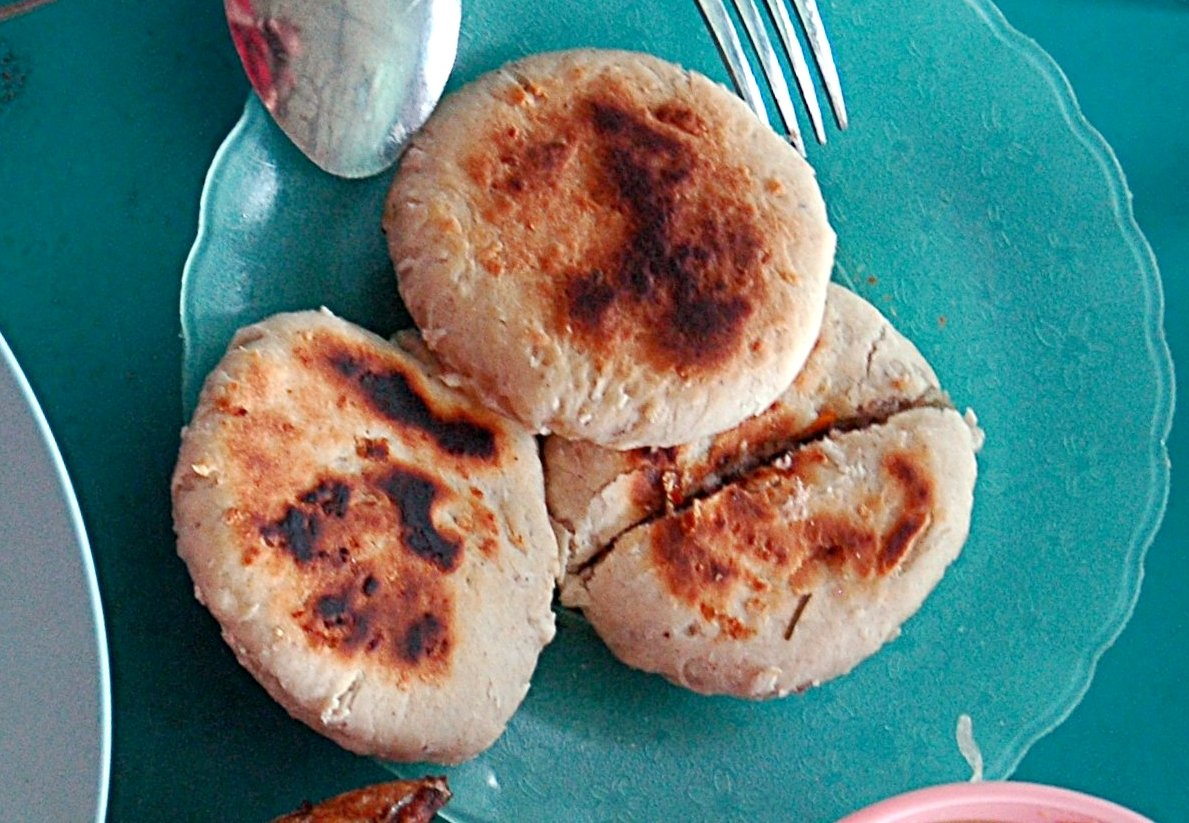
Masroshi, stuffed flatbread

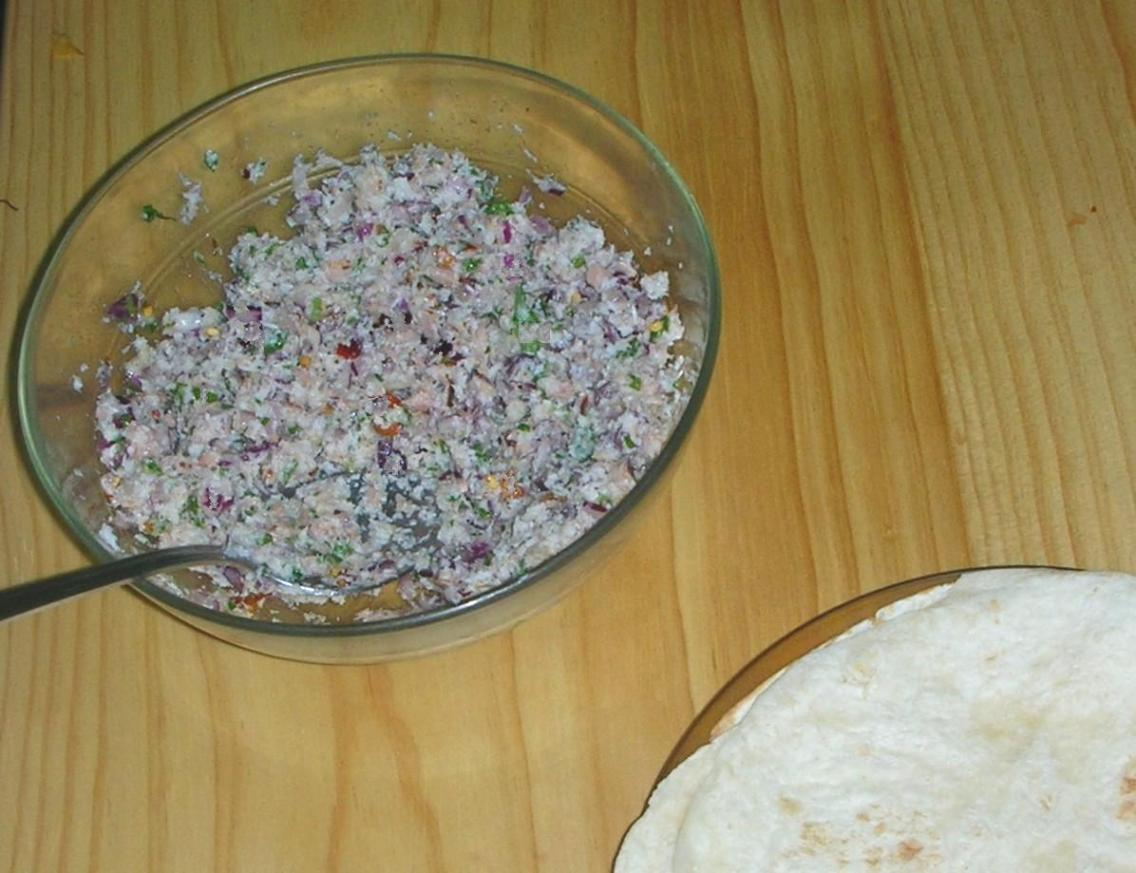
Mas huni (finely chopped tuna and coconut) with roshi bread

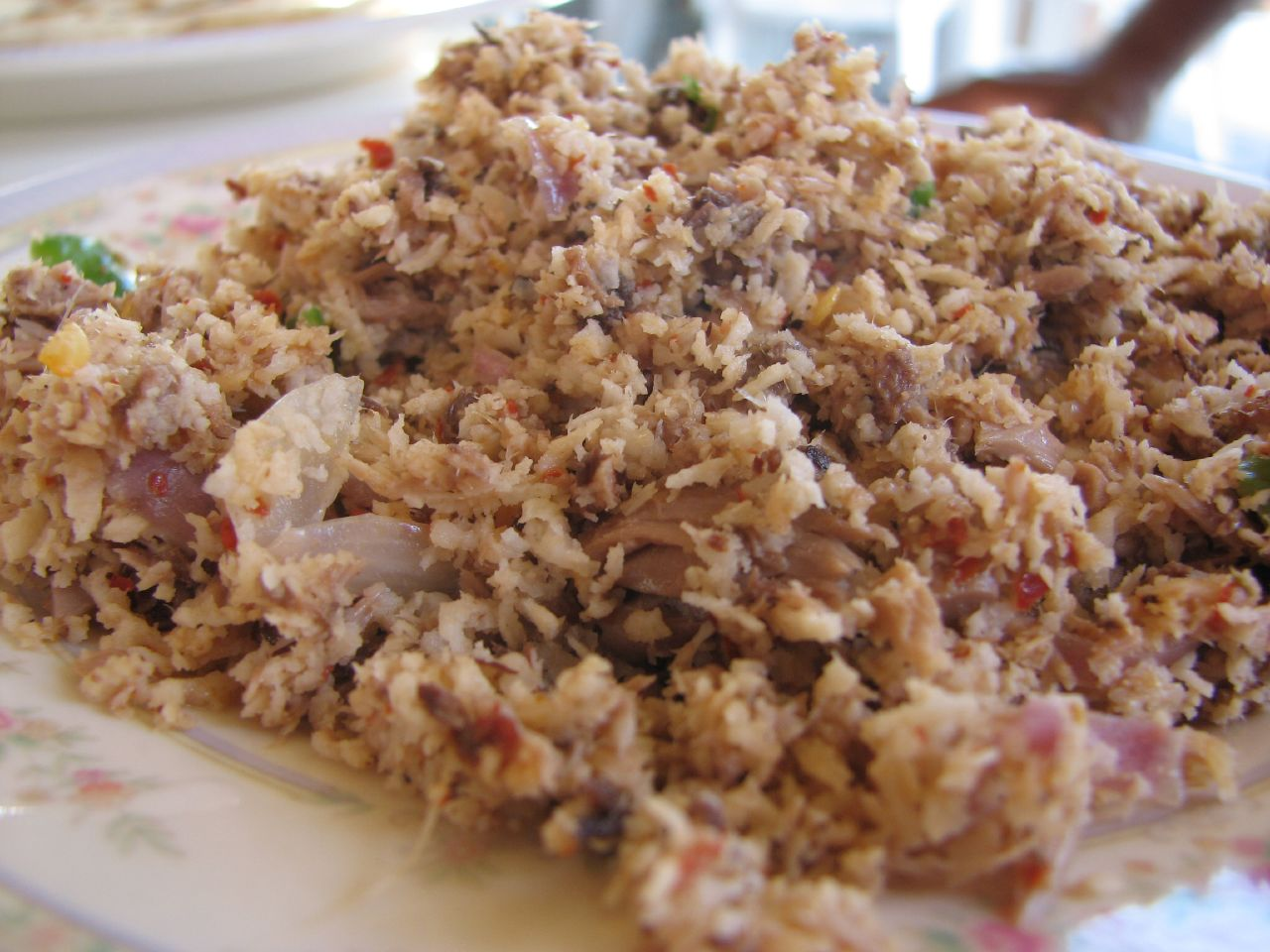
Mas huni

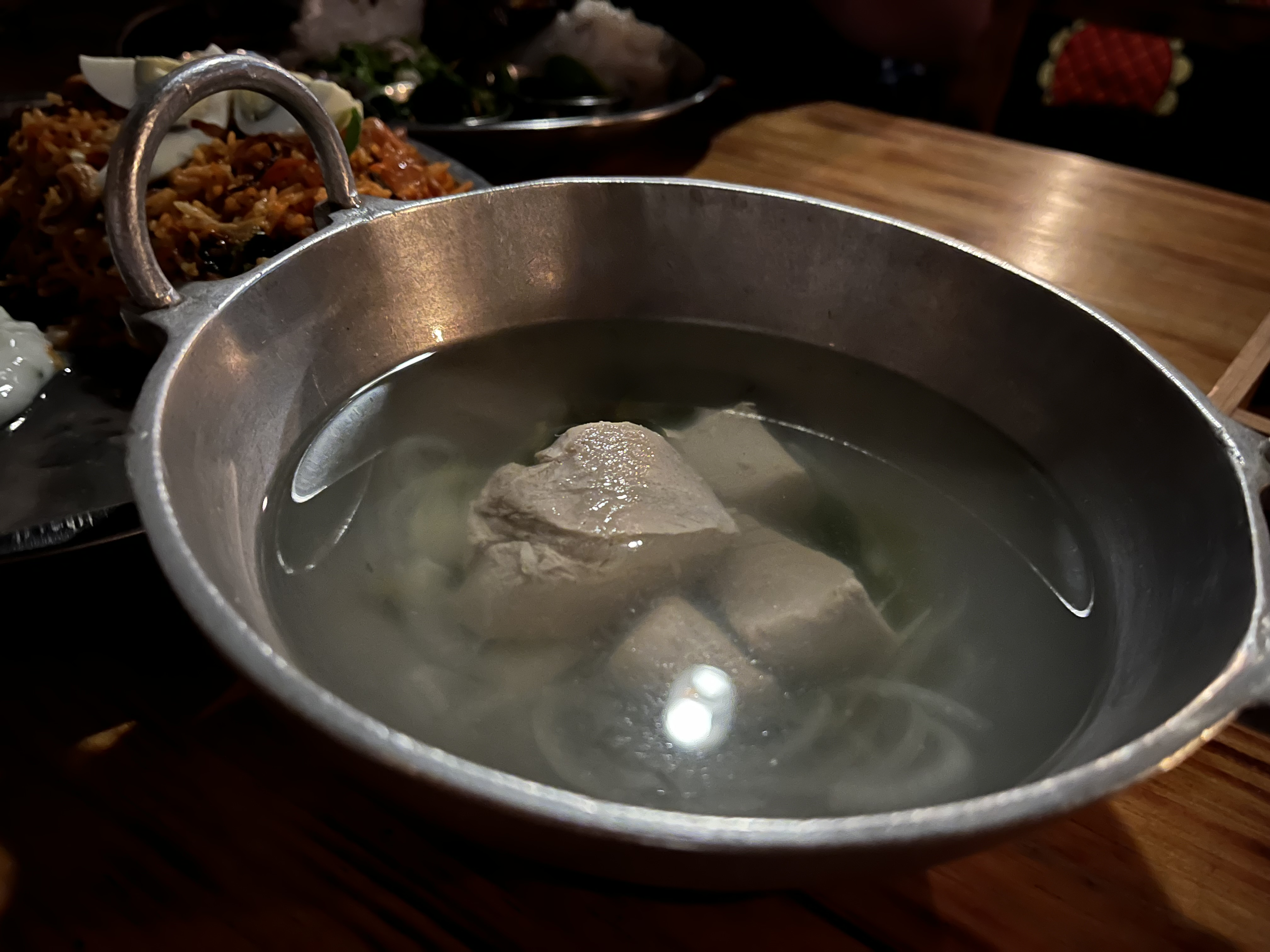
Garudhiya, clear fish broth and the Maldives' national dish

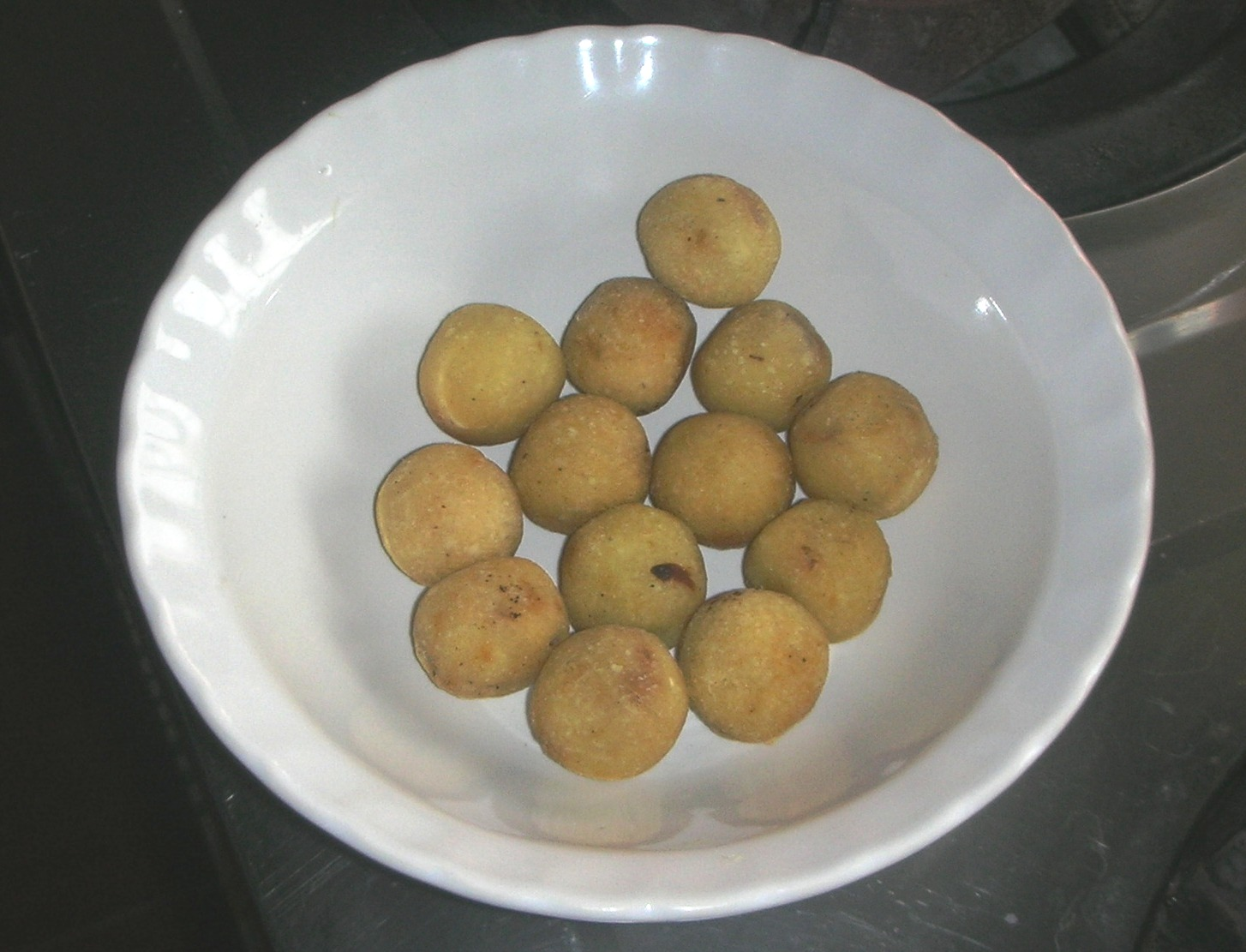
A bowl of gulha, deep-fried balls filled with coconut, tuna, and chili pepper

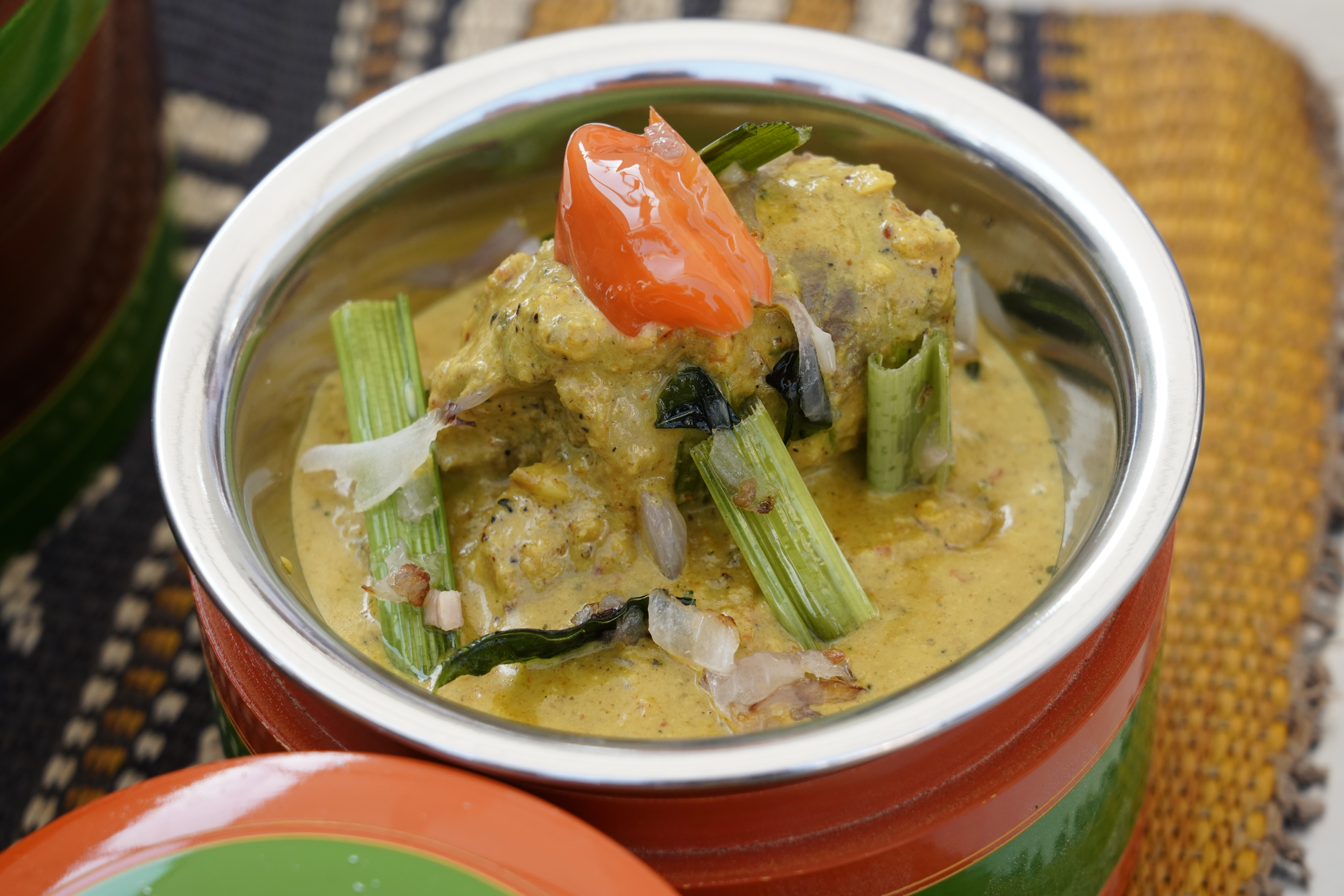
A serving of kandu kukulhu from the World Heritage Cuisine Summit & Food Festival 2018

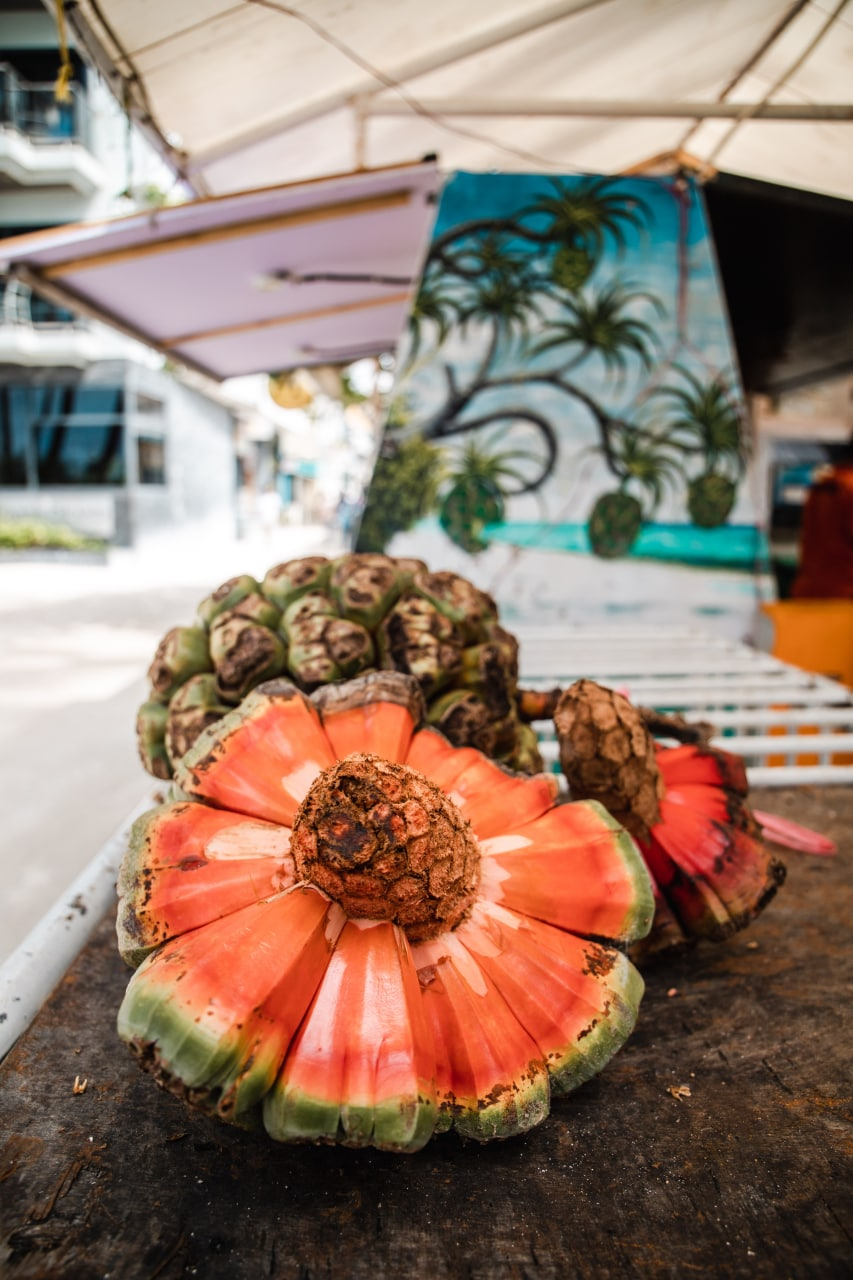
Screwpine (kashikeyo) fruits sold in a market in the Maldives

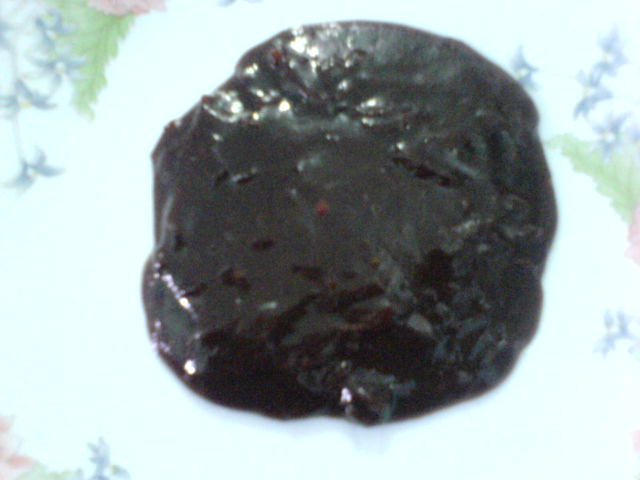
Rihaakuru, a tuna-based thick sauce

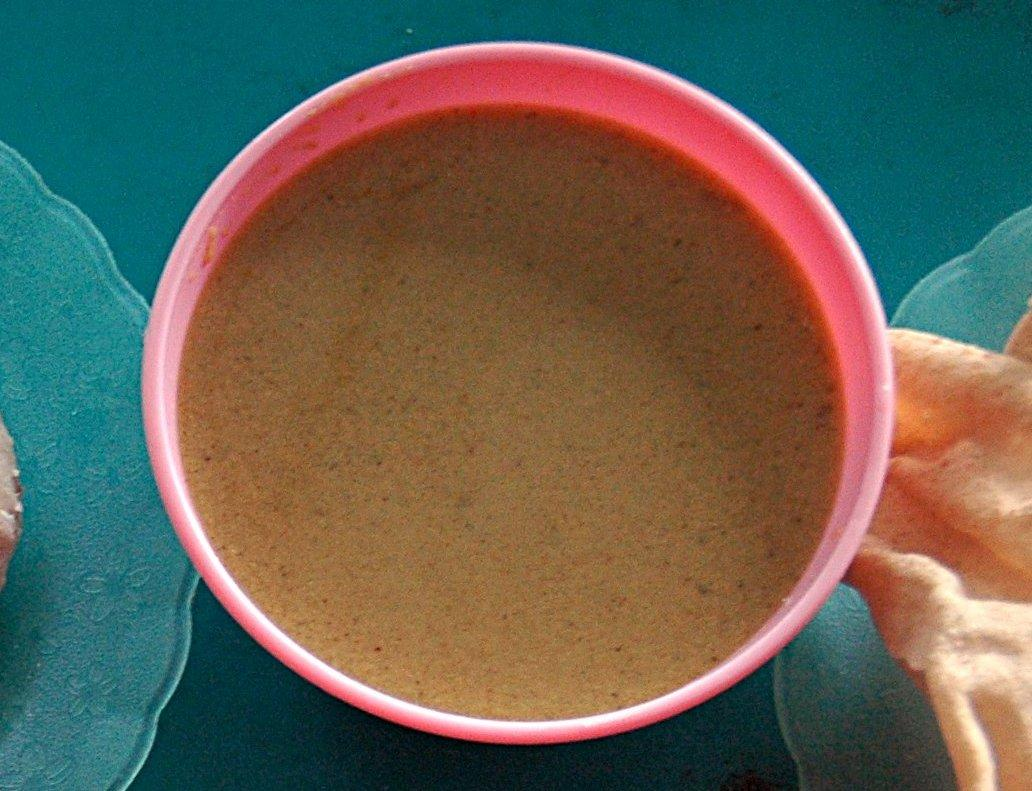
Mas riha, tuna coconut curry.

Maldivian cuisine, also called Dhivehi cuisine, is the cuisine of the Maldives and Minicoy, Lakshadweep, India. The traditional cuisine of Maldivians and Lakshadweep is based on three main items and their derivatives: coconuts, fish, and starches.

== Coconuts ==
Coconuts are used in grated form, squeezed to obtain coconut milk, or their coconut oil is used in dishes that are deep-fried. The hunigondi is the traditional Maldivian implement used to grate the coconut, consisting of a long low chair with a serrated steel blade at its end. Grated coconut is used in dishes such as mas huni, and maskurolhi.

The grated coconut may be alternatively soaked in water and squeezed in order to obtain coconut milk (kaashi kiru). Coconut milk is an essential ingredient in many Maldivian curries and other dishes.

== Fish ==
The fish of choice is mostly skipjack tuna (kaṇḍumas), either dried or fresh. Other similar fish species that are part of the average Maldivian diet are little tunny (laṭṭi), yellowfin tuna (kanneli), frigate tuna (raagondi), bigeye scad (mushimas), wahoo (kurumas), mahi-mahi (fiyala), bluefin jack (handi), and mackerel scad (rimmas). These can be eaten boiled or processed.

Pieces or shavings of Maldives fish (cured tuna) are commonly used. In order to make curries, the raw or the still-soft processed tuna is cut into 1/2-inch-thick (13 mm) sections. Dry processed tuna is mainly used to make short eats (hedhika) such as gulha, masroshi, kulhi (bōkiba), kavaabu, fathafolhi, and bajiyaa (the local version of the Indian samosa). Mas huni is a popular breakfast item consisting of fish mixed with coconut, onions, and chili. Unlike Pacific islanders, Maldivians do not have a tradition of eating raw fish.

The tuna-based thick brown paste known as rihaakuru is also an essential item in Maldivian cuisine.

== Starches ==
Popular starches are rice, which is eaten boiled or ground into flour, tubers such as taro (ala), sweet potato (kattala), and cassava (dandialuvi), as well as fruits like breadfruit (bambukeyo) or screwpine (kashikeyo). Tubers and breadfruit are eaten boiled. The screwpine fruit is mostly eaten raw after having been cut into thin slices.

== Curries ==
The most important curry in the cuisine of the Maldives is cooked with diced fresh tuna and is known as mas riha.

Kukulhu riha (chicken curry) is cooked with a different mixture of spices.

Vegetable curries in the Maldives include those that use bashi (eggplant), tora (Luffa aegyptiaca), barabō (pumpkin), chichanda (Trichosanthes cucumerina) and muranga faiy (moringa leaves), as well as green unripe bananas and certain leaves as their main ingredients. Pieces of Maldives fish are normally added to give the vegetable curry a certain flavor. Curries are usually eaten with steamed rice or with roshi.

== Dishes ==
- Bis riha – curry with the main ingredient being boiled eggs and different spices.
- Gulha (Dhivehi: ގުޅަ, pronounced [guɭa]) – deep-fried balls filled with coconut, tuna, and chili pepper. Other ingredients like curry leaves, ginger, and turmeric can also be added. Gulha are usually served with hot tea as a snack.
- Garudhiya (Dhivehi: ގަރުދިޔަ) – fish broth, most commonly with boiled tuna or skipjack tuna. It is the national dish of Maldives
- Huni roshi – a coconut flatbread originating from the Maldives. It is usually eaten during breakfast and is often paired with sweet or savory sides.
- Kandu kukulhu – Maldivian tuna curry, prepared by rolling tuna fillets through traditional spices which are then cooked in coconut milk.
- Maldives fish (Dhivehi: ވަޅޯމަސް, romanized: valhoamas) – one of the most well-known and popular dishes within the Maldives. Gutted and skinned fish are boiled, smoked, and sun dried. Maldives fish is a tarry black color with a dry texture.
- Maskurolhi – a tuna and coconut chutney similar in appearance to that of mas huni. It is usually eaten with baipen (Maldivian congee).
- Mas huni (Dhivehi: މަސްހުނި) – a breakfast dish consisting of tuna and coconut. Salt and onions can be additionally added.
- Mas riha (Dhivehi: މަސް ރިހަ) – fish curry
- Masroshi – a traditional snack made of fried, stuffed dough that is usually filled with ingredients such as tuna, coconut, onions, garlic, and ginger. Lime juice can also be drizzled on top.
- Miruhulee boava – octopus tentacles braised in curry leaves, chili, garlic, cloves, onion, pepper, and coconut oil
- Rihaakuru (Dhivehi: ރިހާކުރު; pronounced [ɾihaːkuru]) – a thick, brown, nearly-black sauce that is the byproduct of making of Maldives fish. Rihaakuru is consumed almost daily in every household in the Maldives and Minicoy since ancient times. Rihaakuru is cooked on low-heat until it loses its low-viscosity consistency as a result of evaporation, resulting in a thick residue.
- Screwpine (Dhivehi: ކަށިކެޔޮ, romanized: kashikeyo) – a common ingredient in Maldivian cooking but can also be eaten standalone. They are usually sold in markets.

== See also ==
- Indian cuisine
- Garudhiya, the national dish of Maldives
- Maahefun, a Maldivian celebration marking the beginning of Ramadan
- Rihaakuru, a sauce consumed almost daily in all Maldivian households

== Bibliography ==
- Xavier Romero-Frias, Eating on the Islands, Himal Southasian, Vol. 26 no. 2, pages 69–91 ISSN 1012-9804
