= Maahefun =

Celebration of the beginning of Ramadan in the Maldives

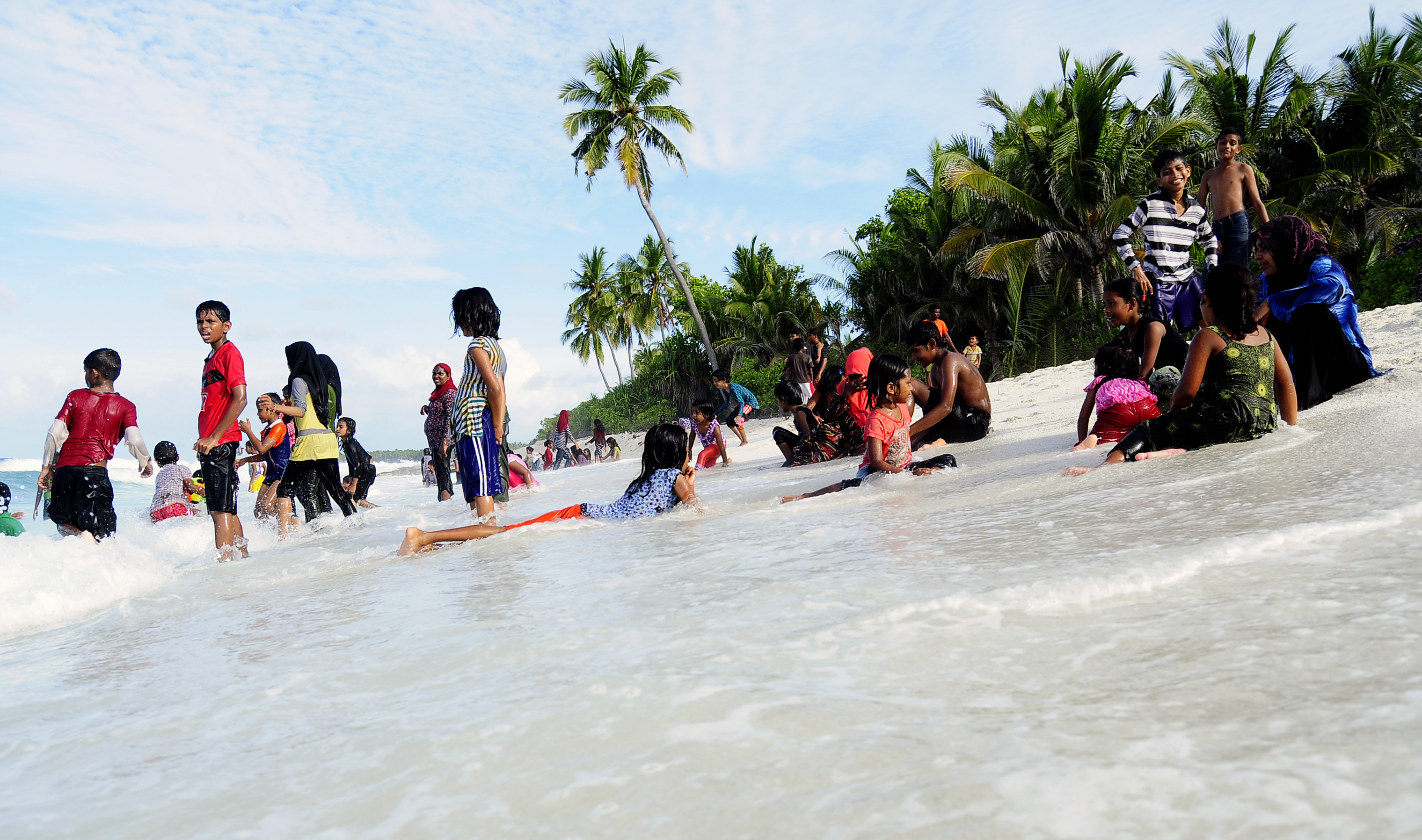
People celebrating Maahefun on a beach at Fuvahmulah, Maldives.

Maahefun is a celebration marking the beginning of Ramadan, where Muslims in the Maldives celebrate the taking of their last meal before beginning the month-long fasting.

The Maahefun events are arranged by families, friends, or organizations, where the food consists of Maldivian snacks that are made from fish, coconut, and locally available root vegetables such as cassava and taro. Other ingredients include lime, chilies, and bananas.

== See also ==
- Ramadan in Maldives
- Maskurolhi
- Shabana (Hejazi tradition)
