= Garudhiya =

Maldivian fish broth

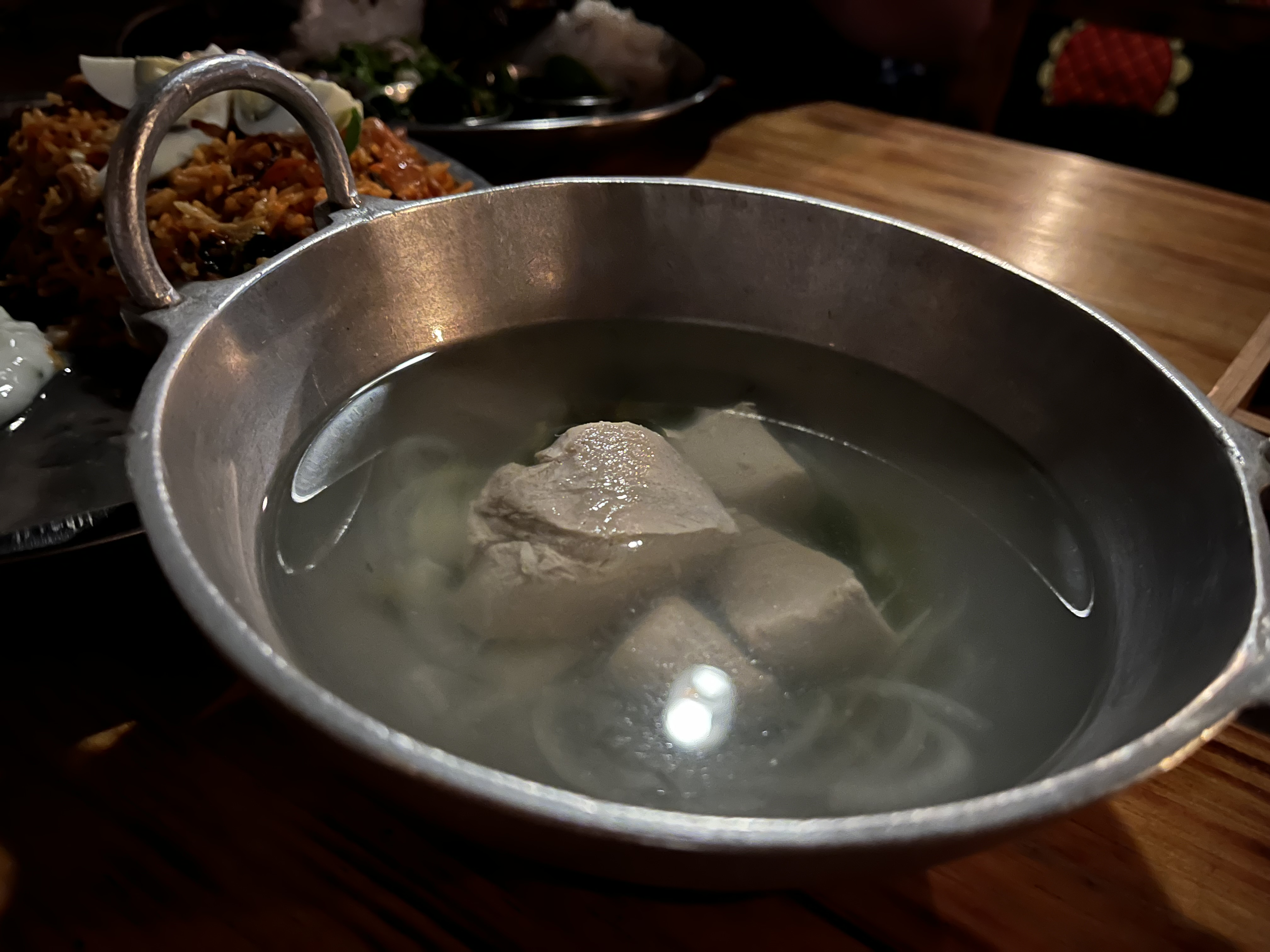
- Garudhiya
- Type: Broth
- Place of origin: Maldives
- Region or state: South Asia
- Main ingredients: Tuna
- Variations: Kekki garudhiya

Garudhiya (Dhivehi: ގަރުދިޔަ) is a clear fish broth. It is one of the basic and traditional food items of Maldivian cuisine. The broth is based on tuna species found in the nation's ocean waters such as skipjack (kanḍumas or goḍa), yellowfin tuna (kanneli), little tunny (lațți), or frigate tuna (raagonḍi).

Despite the introduction of new items in the Maldivian cuisine, garudhiya is still a Maldivian favourite as it has been for generations.

== Preparation ==
In order to cook garudhiya, tuna fish are cut up following a traditional pattern. After having had the gills and some of the innards thrown away, the fish pieces, the heads and the bones are carefully washed. The fish is then boiled in water with salt, until it is well cooked. The foam or scum (filleyo) is carefully removed while boiling and is later discarded.

Garudhiya is usually eaten with steamed rice, but it can also be eaten with roshi, the Maldivian chapati. When eaten with steamed taro (Alocasia and Colocasia), or with steamed breadfruit, grated coconut is added.

== Variants and derivatives ==
Sometimes Maldivians use chilies, curry leaves and onions to flavor the garudhiya according to their taste, however, mostly this broth is cooked simply using fish, salt and water.

Kekki garudhiya is a variant of garudhiya with spices.

Garudhiya could be also obtained using other fishes like wahoo (kurumas), mahi-mahi (fiyala) or bluefin jack (handi), among others, but the favored fish for garudhiya is tuna and related species.

When the tuna-based garudhiya is cooked until all the water evaporates, it forms a thick brown paste known as rihaakuru that is highly valued in the Maldivian diet.

== See also ==
- Maldives fish
- List of tuna dishes
