= Mas huni =

Maldivian dish

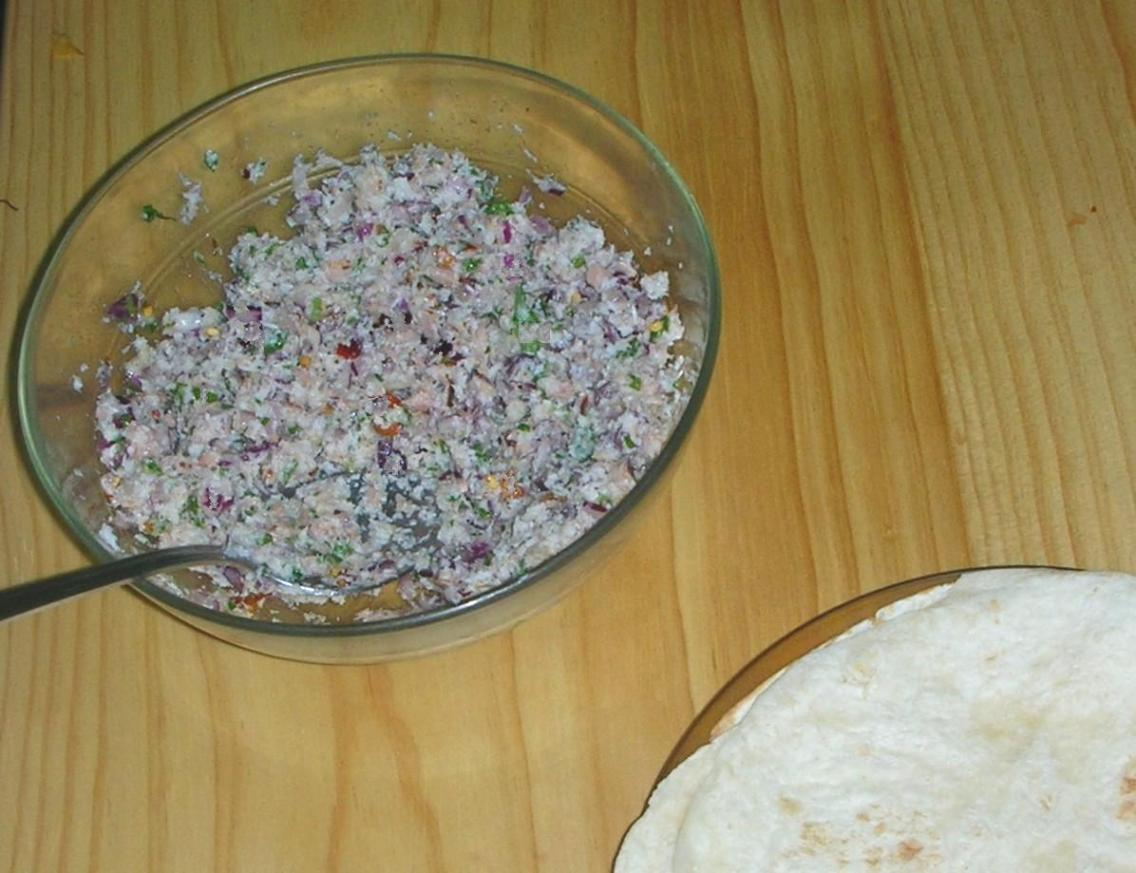
- Mas huni with roshi (flatbread)
- Type: Breakfast dish
- Course: Main Course
- Place of origin: Maldives
- Region or state: South Asia
- Serving temperature: With freshly baked roshi
- Main ingredients: Tuna and grated coconut
- Variations: Baraboa (Pumpkin) mas huni, Fai mas huni, Valhoa mas huni

Mas huni (Dhivehi: މަސްހުނި) is a typical Maldivian breakfast, consisting of tuna, onion, coconut, lime juice, salt to taste and chili. All ingredients are finely chopped and mixed with the grated meat of the coconut. This dish is usually eaten with freshly baked roshi (flatbread) and sweetened hot tea.

== Preparation ==
The fish traditionally used in mas huni was the cured tuna valhoamas, but many Maldivians currently use canned tuna.

Traditionally, when fish was scarce, chopped leaves were added to the mas huni mixture. The green leaves of certain local plants and trees such as diguthiyara (Senna occidentalis), kuḷhafilaa or gōramfau (Launaea sarmentosa), mābulhā (Abutilon theophrasti), muranga (Moringa oleifera), massāgu (Amaranthus spinosus or Amaranthus viridis) sweet potato (Ipomoea batatas) and ḷos (Pisonia grandis), among others, replaced the fish in mas huni in a smaller or greater proportion.

Mas huni may be made with kopee (collard greens) leaves.

Another variant of mas huni is made with muranga pods (Moringa oleifera) instead of leaves. First the pods are boiled; then the flesh with the seeds is scooped out. This is mixed with the rest of the ingredients. This same type of thicker mas huni can be also made with tora (Luffa aegyptiaca), boiled butternut squash or pumpkin.

== See also ==
- Maldivian cuisine
- List of tuna dishes

== Bibliography ==
- Xavier Romero-Frias, Eating on the Islands, Himāl Southasian, Vol. 26 no. 2, pages 69–91 ISSN 1012-9804
