= Rannamaari =

Maldivian legend

The Rannamaari was a sea monster from Maldivian folklore that was believed to have sexually abused and murdered countless young women. According to popular versions of the story, a Maghrebi merchant called Al-Barbari performed a ritual after convincing the authorities at the time to let him take the place of girls meant to be sacrificed to the monster in an effort to save them and the islanders. He recited the Qur'an in the presence of the Rannamaari. With this ritual, the Rannamaari fled and never returned and the incident led to the islanders converting to Islam. The story is one of the most popular legends in the Maldives and regularly retold by locals and national media to the present day.

== Appearance ==
According several local accounts, Rannamaari is described as looking like a ship filled with lamps.

== Variations and reception ==
The story of Rannamaari has several versions, but the two most popular include the popular traditional version shared by many locals and the Maldivian government and the other version recounted by 14th century traveller Ibn Battuta. Both versions are very similar and differ in a few details.

The story of Rannamarri is considered an influential narrative of Islamization that has shaped Maldivian perspectives of their history, culture and religion. The tale is regularly retold in schools, in plays, tourist brochures and in local and national media. Local storytellers often frame the Rannamaari myth as a Maldivian victory over superstition, achieved through Islam. Yet folklorist Xavier Romero Frías notes that the name Rannamaari belongs to a South Indian goddess and observes that many Maldivian folktales revolve around perilous female spirits.

== Outline of story ==
Rannamaari, the notorious sea demon that haunted the people of the Maldives since time immemorial. Every month, a virgin had to be sacrificed to the demon while failure to do so would lead to the islanders facing its wrath. A girl was chosen from the inhabitants by drawing lots, dressed up, and she would subsequently be kept alone on the first night of the month in an isolated Buddhist temple at the eastern seafront in Malé. At dawn, the girl's family would return to the temple to find the girl dead and her body violated. Maldivians were very distraught over the consistent sacrifices until a Muslim traveller from the Maghreb called Abu'l-Barakat al-Barbari suggested that he be sent to the temple in place of a girl to read verses of the Quran there. After the traveller recited the Quran in the temple, the demon disappeared and was never heard of again. The king then converted to Islam and the legend relates that the islanders converted soon after as well. The king (often identified as Dhovemi of the Maldives), then also changed his name into Sultan Mohammed bin Abdullah.

== Analysis ==
According to archaeologist Egil Mikkelsen, the legend may be inspired by Buddhist tantric rituals and beliefs that were likely practiced in the islands at the time. These rituals included Tantric sex (physically or metaphorically) as a means to reach enlightenment and belief in demonic spirits in where practitioners became possessed and exhibited aggressive behaviors for spiritual means. Tantric texts such as the Hevajra speak of violent imagery, "You should kill living beings, speak lying words, take what is not given, consort with the women of others." Such texts were used in rituals and portions of it were usually understood as literary or figurative. The temple the women were left at to get sacrificed may represent a Tantric Buddhist centre for such rituals. The rape and death of the young women by the monster may indicate traces of customs like the aggression of practitioners possessed by spirits, sexual Tantric practices and violent content within popular Tantric texts. Meanwhile, the monster itself may represent local beliefs in evil spirits.

Scholar Xavier Romero-Frias has stated that the general outline of the legend shares key similarities with a story within the ancient Sanskrit text, the Panchatantra, titled Nandapakarana.

== See also ==
- Folklore of the Maldives
- Rihla
- Medhu Ziyaaraiy
- Xavier Romero-Frias, scholar of Maldivian culture and mythology
