= Kandu kukulhu =

Traditional Maldivian dish

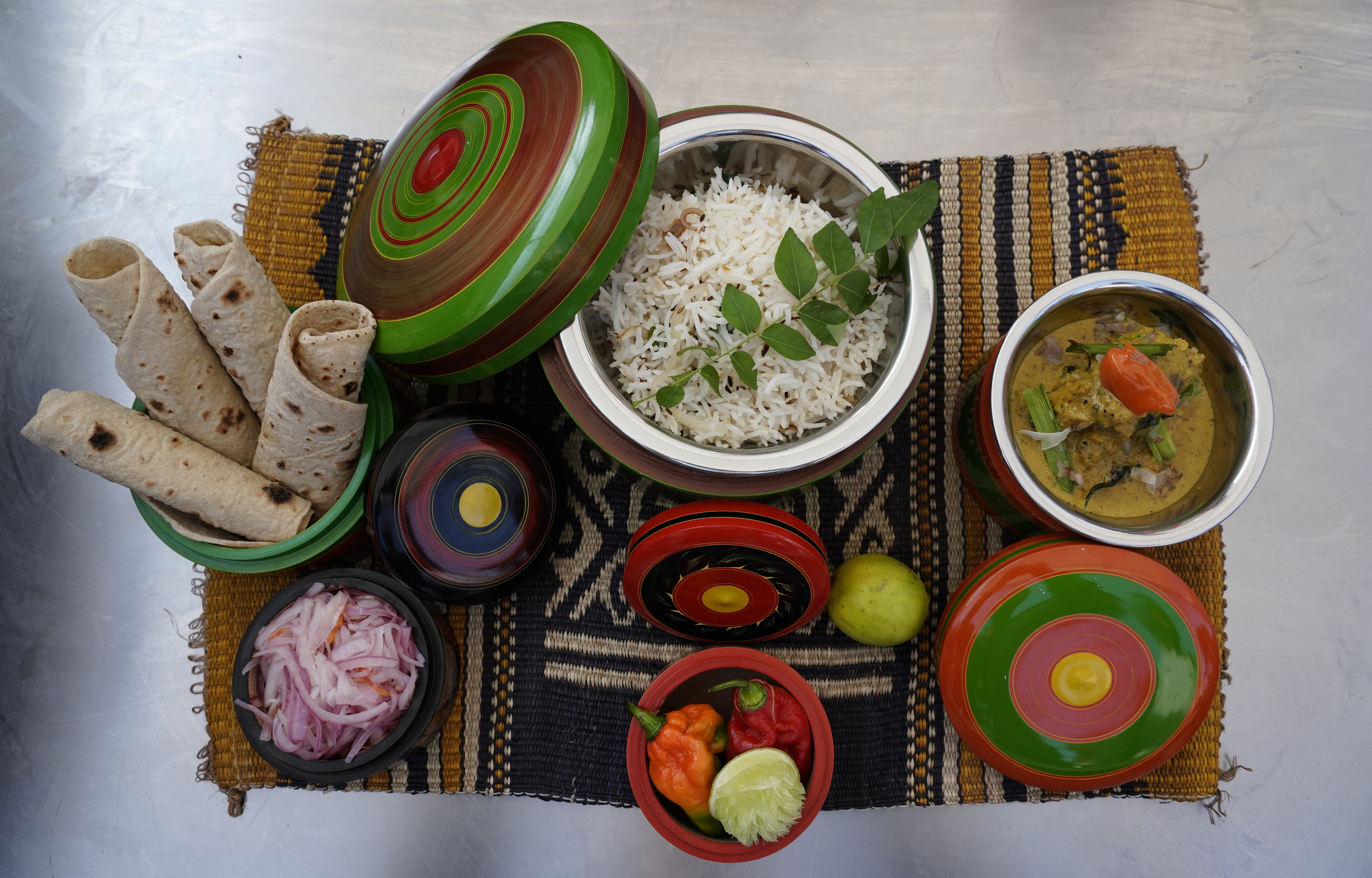
Kandu kukulhu (far right) served with rice, roshi, and salad

Kandu kukulhu is a traditional Maldivian dish, consisting of tuna fillets rolled with spices and cooked in coconut milk.

== Etymology ==
Kandu kukulhu literally translates as "chicken of the sea".

== Method ==
Tuna fillets are rolled with curry paste and tied together with a strip of coconut leaf. The curry is usually prepared overnight. It is then served with rice or roshi, a flatbread.

== See also ==
- Mas riha
- List of tuna dishes
