= Gulha =

Tuna and coconut dumplings

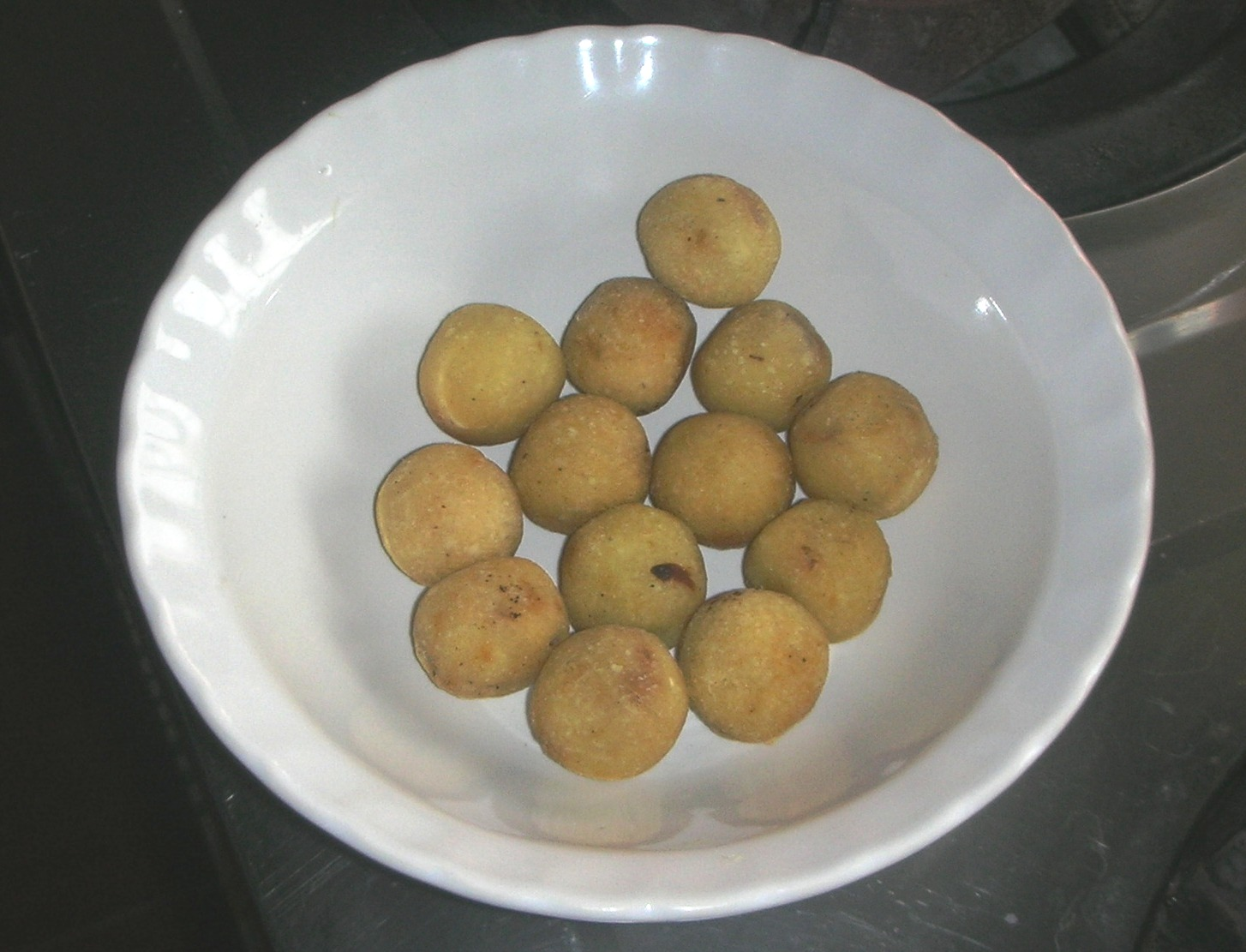
- Gulha snacks from Maldives. Hanḍū gulha
- Type: Snack food
- Place of origin: Maldives
- Region or state: South Asia
- Serving temperature: Preferably freshly-prepared along with hot tea
- Main ingredients: Flour, tuna and grated coconut
- Variations: Made with wheat flour or with rice flour dough

Gulha (Dhivehi: ގުޅަ; pronounced [guɭa]) is a typical and popular Maldivian snack food.

Gulha are small ball-shaped dumplings that are stuffed with a mixture of tuna, finely chopped onion, grated coconut, and chili. Depending on the cook, turmeric, lime juice ginger and chopped curry leaves are added to the mixture. Once ready, the gulha are deep-fried.

Gulha can be made with wheat flour or rice flour dough. The rice-flour gulha are usually smaller, harder and more crunchy. The size of gulha may vary from the large ones that are slightly larger than the size of a ping-pong ball to the smallest which are about the size of marbles. This snack was traditionally eaten with sweetened hot tea and sometimes also together with other short eats.

The fish used traditionally for stuffing gulha was commonly Maldives fish (Dhivehi: ވަޅޯމަސް, romanized: valhoamas), but nowadays many Maldivians use canned tuna. Alternatively, gulha may be oven-baked instead of deep-fried.

== See also ==
- Maldivian cuisine
- List of tuna dishes
