= Rihaakuru =

Fish-based sauce

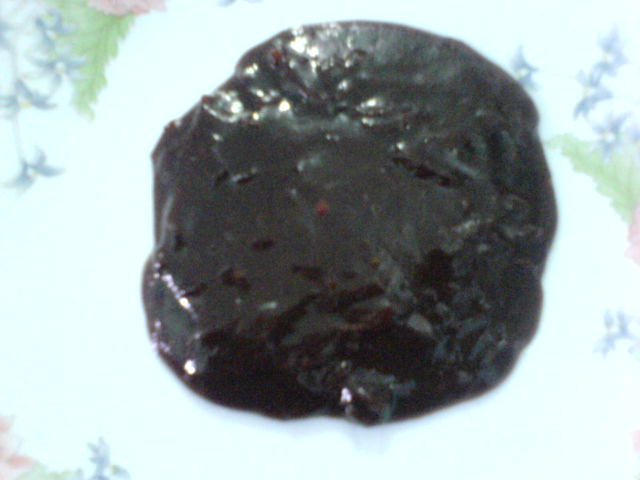
Rihaakuru

Rihaakuru (Dhivehi: ރިހާކުރު; pronounced [ɾihaːkuru]) is a tuna-based thick sauce. The color varies from light brown to dark brown. It is a traditional dish of Maldivian cuisine, consumed almost daily in every household in Maldives and in Minicoy since ancient times. Rihaakuru is produced as a by-product of the processing of tuna.

== History ==
Maldivian travellers introduced Rihaakuru and Bondi to Sri Lanka (then Ceylon). Sri Lankans considered these as delicacies and referred to them as Bondi Haluwa and Dhiyā Hakuru (rhyming derivative, of the original Dhivehi term, which means 'liquid jaggery' in the Sinhalese language) respectively. These terms were popular in Sri Lankan households until the latter part of the 20th century, when they gradually disappeared.

== Preparation ==
Rihaakuru is obtained through following a simple but time-consuming procedure. The extract is the result of hours of cooking of tuna in water and salt, while carefully removing the scum (filleyo) that keeps forming. Once the tuna pieces are cooked and ready to eat or store, they will be removed from the water, as well as the bones, heads and fish guts. The pieces of tuna, so cooked, get eventually processed into Maldives fish. The remaining "fish-soup" (Garudhiya) is left with Bondi (balls of tuna scraps scraped off the bones), and is kept boiling in low fire until most water evaporates. The resulting concentrated fish soup becomes a thick paste which is known in Dhivehi as Rihaakuru.

Rihaakuru is eaten pure in the Maldives along with rice (baiy), taro (ala), roti (roshi), or breadfruit (banbukeyo). It is also cooked with fried onions, curry-leaves (hikandifaiy) and chilies in order to obtain a delicious variant called theluli rihaakuru (spiced rihaakuru). In Maldivian cuisine it is also mixed with coconut milk, to obtain a dish called rihaakuru dhiya.

In some countries people use Rihaakuru as a sandwich spread, likening its use to other by-product spreads such as Vegemite, Bovril and Marmite . A noticeable consumption of Rihaakuru has been recorded in China, namely in Chinese dishes like Char kway teow, Fried Vegetables (Gai Lan, Choy sum and Pak choy).

Rihaakuru is slightly acidic (pH 5.6-6.2) and is rich in polyunsaturated fatty acids such as omega-3 and protein.

== Nutrition ==
Nutrition Table for 100GRMS of Rihaakuru.
Calories	250
Proteins	58%
Fats	1.4%
Carbohydrates	1.1%

== See also ==
- List of tuna dishes
