= Althaeus =

Scientific classification
- Kingdom: Animalia
- Phylum: Arthropoda
- Class: Insecta
- Order: Coleoptera
- Suborder: Polyphaga
- Infraorder: Cucujiformia
- Family: Chrysomelidae
- Subfamily: Bruchinae
- Tribe: Bruchini
- Genus: Althaeus; Bridwell, 1946

Genus of beetles

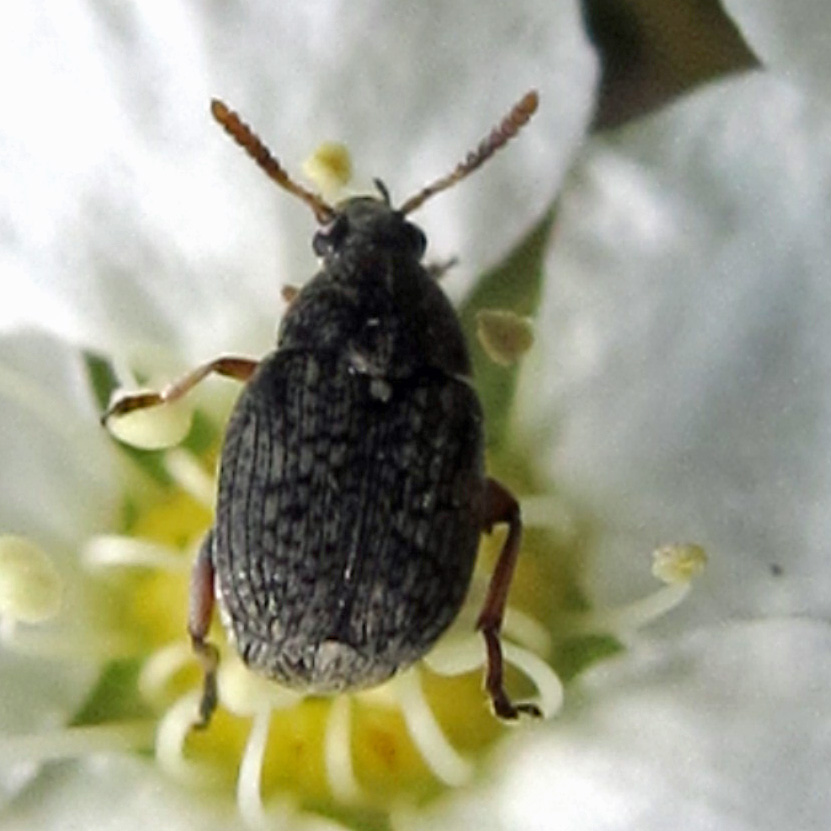
Seed Beetle Althaeus hibisci, Wheatley, Ontario, Canada.

Althaeus is a genus of pea and bean weevils in the beetle family Chrysomelidae. There are at least three described species in Althaeus.

== Species ==
These three species belong to the genus Althaeus:

- Althaeus folkertsi Kingsolver in Kingsolver, Gibb & Pfaffenberger, 1989 (velvetleaf seed beetle)
- Althaeus hibisci (Olivier, 1795)
- Althaeus steneri Kingsolver in Kingsolver, Gibb & Pfaffenberger, 1989
