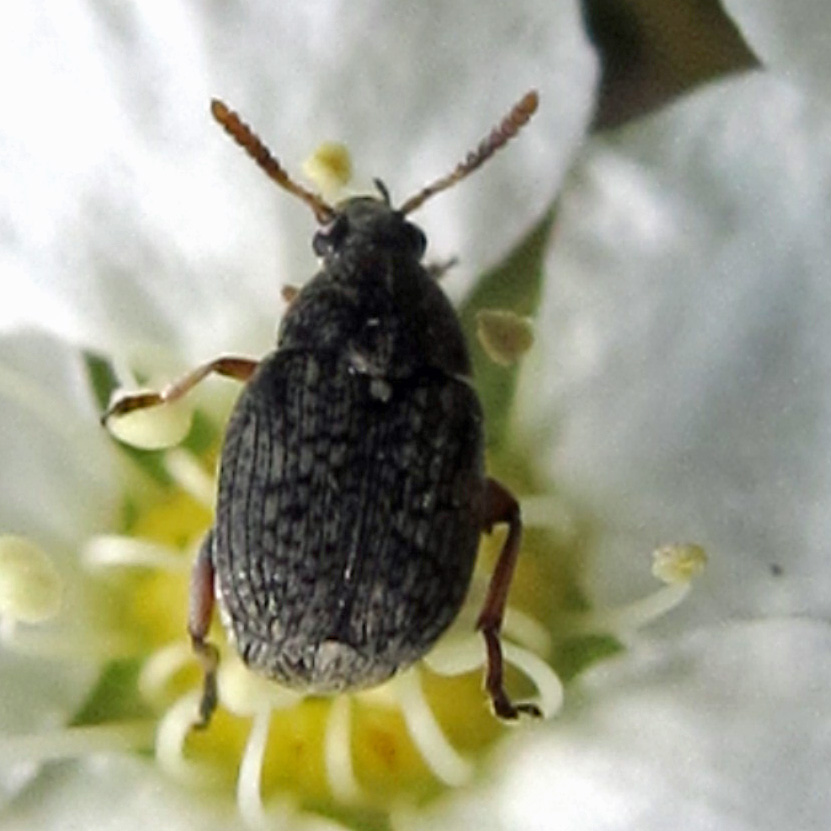

Scientific classification
- Kingdom: Animalia
- Phylum: Arthropoda
- Clade: Pancrustacea
- Class: Insecta
- Order: Coleoptera
- Suborder: Polyphaga
- Infraorder: Cucujiformia
- Family: Chrysomelidae
- Genus: Althaeus
- Species: A. hibisci

Binomial name
- Althaeus hibisci (Olivier, 1795)

= Althaeus hibisci =

Species of beetle

Althaeus hibisci is a species of leaf beetle in the family Chrysomelidae. It is found in North America.
