= Folklore of the Maldives =

Body of myths, tales and anecdotes belonging to the oral tradition of Maldivians

Maldivian mythology or Maldivian folklore is the body of myths, tales and anecdotes belonging to the oral tradition of Maldivians. Even though some of the Maldivian myths were already mentioned briefly by British commissioner in Ceylon HCP Bell towards the end of the 19th century, their study and publication were carried out only quite recently by Spanish writer and artist Xavier Romero-Frias, at a time when that ancestral worldview was quickly disappearing.

The Maldives lie in the warm equatorial area of the Indian Ocean surrounded by very deep waters. This nation is made up exclusively of coral atolls. There are about 1,200 small flat and sandy islands, but only about 200 of them are inhabited.

The Maldives have been continuously populated for millennia; therefore the folklore of these islands is very ancient.

== Myths of origin ==
The main myths of origin are reflecting the dependence of the Maldivians on the coconut tree and the tuna fish.

A legend says that the first inhabitants of the Maldives died in great numbers, but a great sorcerer or fanḍita man made coconut trees grow out of the skulls of the buried corpses of the first settlers. Therefore, the coconut tree is said to have an anthropomorphic origin according to Maldive lore.

The coconut tree occupies a central place in the present-day Maldive national emblem.

The tuna fish is said to have been brought to the Maldivian waters by a mythical seafarer (maalimi) called Bodu Niyami Kalēfanu who went close to the Dagas (the mythical tree at the end of the world) to bring this valuable fish.

== Myths of extinction ==
These myths tell that the end of the Maldives will be a great catastrophe where the islands will be submerged by the surrounding ocean. Similar myths are found in the Andaman Islands as well as in the Nicobar Islands.

== The origin of Malé ==
Early settlers in the Maldives were probably Gujaratis, who reached and settled Sri Lanka about 500 B.C. Evidence of cultural influence from North India can be deduced from the methods of boat building and silver punch-marked coins

It is said that Giraavaru fishermen used to go regularly to a certain large sandbank (finolhu) at the southern end of their atoll to clean tuna fish after a good catch. Owing to a large amount of tuna fish offal and blood, the waters around that sandbank looked like a big pool of blood (maa ley gande'h). "Maa" (from the Tamil "Maa" lit."great" or "big"), meaning big, and "Lē" meaning blood. Traditionally the first inhabitants of the Maldives, which include the Giraavaru people, didn't have kings. They lived in a simple society and were ruled by local headmen.

One day a prince from the Subcontinent called Koimala arrived to Malé Atoll sailing from the north on a big ship. The people of Giraavaru spotted his vessel from afar and welcomed him. They allowed Prince Koimala to settle on that large sandbank in the midst of the waters tainted with fishblood. Trees were planted on the sandbank and it is said that the first tree that grew on it was the papaya tree. As time went by the local islanders accepted the rule of this Northern Prince. A palace was built and the island was formally named Maa-le Malé, while the nearest island was named Hulhule (Hulhulé).

== Evil spirits ==
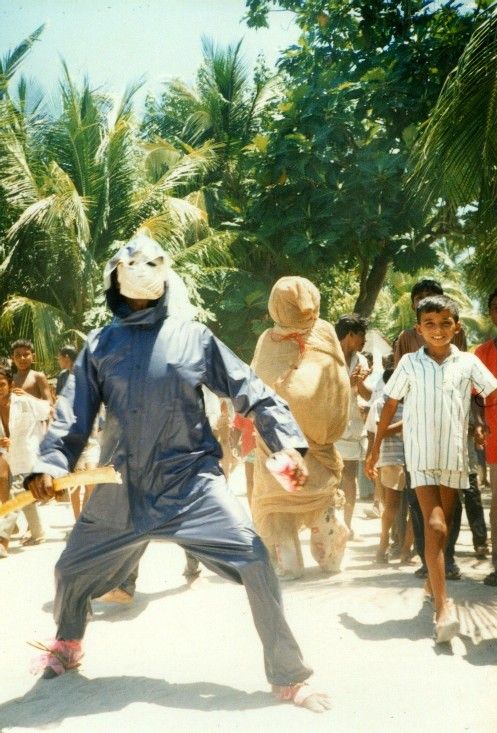
Be. Popular celebration in Holhudu Island. Maali .

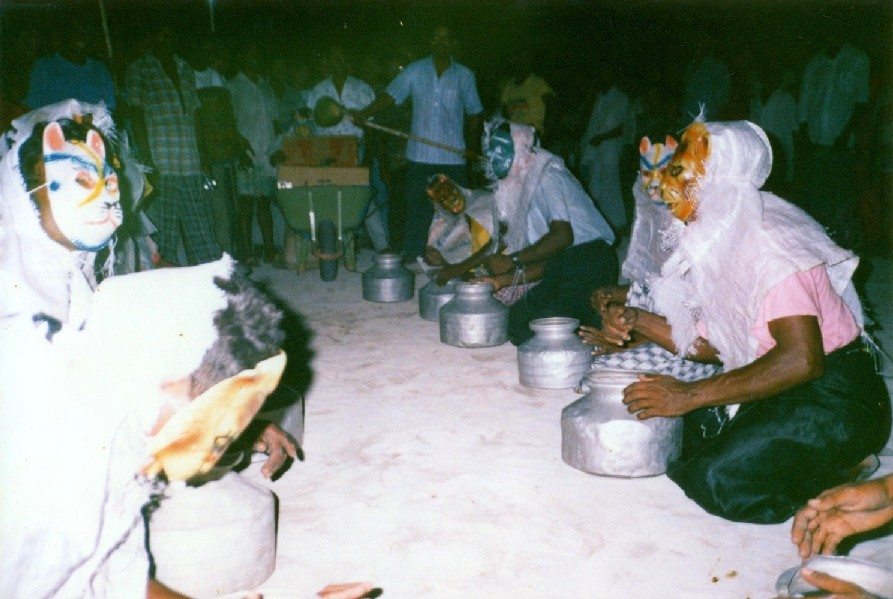
Be. Popular celebration in Holhudu Island. Bandiyaa jehun.

Most of the popular tales in Maldives are about evil spirits and their interaction with the islanders. These stories contain always a lesson in some form or the other. Certain actions became necessary to avoid trouble with the spirit world. These patterns of behaviour, like the importance of keeping a secret, as well as the avoidance of certain areas of the island and of inauspicious times, were an essential component of the ancient popular spirituality.

The Maldivian spirits can take human form, even if it is not known whether they have a human origin or not. While in human shape, the malevolence of those spirits is often masked by beauty and youth. Certain Maldivian evil spirits (handi) have the appearance of charming, beautiful women. These stories about female spirits have their origin in the Ancient Dravidian Village Goddess worship and they point to the ethnic origin of the Maldive people.

Other evil spirits which are the subject of many folk stories in the Maldives (faru furēta meaning "reef monster") are crude monsters coming from the ocean waters mainly reefs. The tales about reef monsters are part of the local cultural background, which is characterised by the oceanic environment in which, along the millennia, the Maldivian culture developed.

== Foolhudhigu Handi ==
Hassan Thakuru, a skilled boatsman, once left his beloved wife, Aiminabi, to travel to a distant island for work. While away, Aiminabi tended to her activities, one of which including fetching water from the well near the graveyard at dusk. After collecting all that she needed, she turned around to head back home with a full bucket of water, only to be met with a grisly, frightening sight. What her eyes lay upon can only be described as ghastly and terrifying; a monster wrapped in its own umbilical cord, shovelling sand and mud over its body with a human skull. Out of shock, she drops her pot of water, accidentally making her presence known to the monster.

The monster, known as Foolhudhigu Handi, followed her home and circled the hut, shaking it, demanding to know if it had been seen by Aiminabi. She lies, claiming that she saw nothing, so it leaves only to return the following night to terrorise her again. She stands firm in her position that she saw nothing, so it leaves again. Foolhudhigu returns for a third time, however, Hassan Thakuru has returned from his duties now. Together, the husband and wife devise a plan to kill the monster. Once again, Foolhudhigu asks Aiminabi if she saw him, only this time she confesses to seeing him. This threw Foolhudhigu into a fit of rage, to which he responded by poking his umbilical cord through a hole into the hut. Hassan Thakura wasted no time in grabbing it, pulled it until there was none left to be pulled, and cut it off at its base with a hatchet. Aiminabi finished the job by smearing chili paste over the wound, and Foolhudhigu took off into the night, screaming in agony, never to be seen again.

== Local fauna ==
Folktales where fishes, crabs and seabirds are the heroes, like the tales about Mākana, Findana, Kalhubondage Diye, Fandiyaaru Kakuni, or Don Mohonaai Miyaru, introduce us to the world of the local fauna of the Maldive Atolls, where land animals are very few. Many of these are tales for children and some are still quite popular. Although most of the stories of this type are original, a few are foreign tales or fables which have been adapted to the island context through local storytellers or by Maldivian learned men, like the late Mohamed Jameel Didi.

== Mighty sorcerers ==
In the ancestral oral literature of Maldivians, the sorcerer, or learned man of the island who knew the magic arts. Magic or sorcery is known in Maldives as fanḍitha.

The Maldivian sorcerer or fanḍitha veriyaa is always portrayed in the folklore of Maldivians as a hero. Only he knew how to appease the spirits that terrified the average island folk on a daily (or better nightly) basis. Some recent stories tend to cast the sorcerer in the role of a villain, but these are totally disconnected from the ancestral Maldive lore.

== The conversion to Islam ==
According to the well-known Moroccan traveller Ibn Batutta, the person responsible for converting the Maldivians to Islam was a Sunni Muslim visitor named Abu al Barakat ul Barbari. He subdued rannamaari, a demon coming from the sea and convinced the King to become a Muslim. However, according to local historical chronicles, Raadavalhi and Taarikh, mention that this saint was actually a Persian from the city of Tabriz, called Yusuf Shamsud-din. He is also locally known as Tabrīzugefānu. The much venerated tomb of this saint now stands opposite the grounds of Hukuru Miski, in the centre of Malé, the capital.

== Local characters ==
Stories about local characters, like Rōnu Eduru, Kuda Tuttu Didi, Kalhukuru or Naalaafushi Fagīru (the poor man of Naalaafushi) give us a glimpse on the way of life in the Maldives when the archipelago was a kingdom. In these stories we learn much about the life in the court in Malé and about the interactions between the Radun (the king of Maldives) and his subjects.

== Modern variants ==
Since there are a great number of islands in the Maldives, many folkstories have different versions according to the particular island and the storyteller in question. In recent times some stories have been abridged by contemporary Maldivian writers, like Abdulla Sadiq or Ahumadu Sharīfu (Maradū) because of their extreme length.

Other stories (Karukuru, Telabagudi and the Māmeli tales) have been sanitised, because there was much casual reference to defecation and bodily fluids, particularly in ancient folk-stories from the outer atolls, where local values found this acceptable.

== The Koimala myth ==
Koimala Siri Mahaabarana Mahaa Radun (Dhivehi: ކޮއިމަލާ ސިރީ މަހާބަރަނަ މަހާ ރަދުން) or Koimala (Dhivehi: ކޮއިމަލާ literally "flower lad") or Koimala Kalo (Dhivehi: ކޮއިމަލާ ކަލޯ, literally "Lord Koimala") is a myth about the first king of all the Maldivian Islands. Some versions of the Koimala myth claim that it refers to the first ruler of the Maldives after the conversion to Islam, also known as Dharumavantha rasgefaanu, who ruled from 1117 to 1141. It is believed that he was also the first king from the House of Theemuge and the Lunar Dynasty. By other accounts he was the fourth king of the Lunar Dynastry founded by King Balaadeettiya as the Soma Vansa Kingdom; although until Koimala the house only ruled over part of the Maldives.

However, ascribing the legend to the first Islamic ruler does not explain who built the large Buddhist monuments that are present in many inhabited islands and that were built in the first millennium AD. It also leaves without explaining the existence of an ancient kingly dynasty in the Maldives already before the conversion, as the 12th century correspondence from the king to the Sangumanun, or community of Buddhist monks, in Sathudhuvumati (Haddummati Atoll) via copper plates proves.

According to Maldivian Folklore, Koimala was a prince from the Indian subcontinent who arrived in Malé Atoll. The people of Giraavaru spotted his vessel from afar and welcomed him. They allowed Prince Koimala to settle on that large sandbank in the midst of the waters tainted with fishblood. Trees were planted on the sandbank and it is said that the first tree that grew on it was the papaya tree. As time went by the local islanders accepted the rule of this northern prince. A palace was built and the island was formally named Maa-le (Malé), while the nearest island was named Hulhu-le (Hulhulé). Since then Malé has been the seat of the Maldivian crown and now the head of state.

A different account claims Koimala to be a Sinhalese prince of royal birth from Sri Lanka. The prince is said to have married the Ceylon king's daughter and made a voyage with her in two vessels from Ceylon. Reaching the Maldives they were becalmed, and rested a while at Rasgetheemu island (meaning the King's Island) in Northern Maalhosmadulhu Atoll. The Maldive Islanders who were then Buddhists, learning that the two chief visitors were of royal descent from the Buddhist kingdom of Ceylon, invited them to remain and ultimately proclaimed Koimala their king at Rasgetheemu. The new king and his spouse migrated to Malé and settled there with the consent of the aborigines of Giraavaru (See Giraavaru people) – then the most important community of Malé Atoll. Until then the Maldives is thought to have been ruled by different matriarchies in different atolls.

After the settlement in Male', two vessels were dispatched to bring more people of his race to populate Male'. It wasn't tradition for the Giraavaru and perhaps other aboriginal people of the Maldives to marry outside their community.

It is not clear, how much of this legend is true. Although he might have been the first king of the whole of Maldives, the story of a prince might actually be a corruption of the stories of King Soorudasaruna-Adeettiya and King Balaadeettiya- both exiled princes from the Kalinga Kingdom of India who founded the Solar and Lunar Dynastries of the Maldives. According to this source (Kitab fi Athaari Meedoo el-Qadimiyyeh by Allama Ahmed Shihabuddine relating from The Maapanansa copper plates), Koimala or Siri Mahaabarana, the son of King Siri Bovana Aananda was the fourth king of the Lunar Dynastry and uncle to King Dhovemi (Siri Bavana-adiththa) the first Sultan (Muslim king) of the Maldives.

Koimala is said to have become the King of the 14 atolls and two thousand islands of the Dheeva Mahal. His kingdom was referred to as being Malikaddu dhemedhu- or 'all that lies between the Maliku and Addu. He fought against the Raja Dada's (or the forces of the Tamil emperor Raja Raja Chola I of the Chola Empire) Indians to claim the two northernmost atolls for the newly formed Maldivian kingdom. Koimala was succeeded by his nephew Dhovemi Kalaminja in 1141.
