= Ramadan in the Maldives =

Religious observance in the Maldives

Ramadan in the Maldives holds profound religious and cultural significance in the Maldives, where the population is entirely Sunni Muslim. The observance of Ramadan involves fasting from dawn to sunset, increased prayer, charity, and community gatherings.

== Cultural traditions and celebrations ==
A distinctive Maldivian tradition, Maahefun marks the commencement of Ramadan. Families, friends, and organizations gather to share a final meal before the month-long fast begins. The feast features traditional Maldivian snacks crafted from local ingredients such as fish, coconut, cassava, taro, lime, chilies, and bananas. Maahefun serves as a communal celebration, fostering unity and spiritual readiness for the fasting period.

== Government policies and public life ==
The Maldivian government modifies official working hours to accommodate the spiritual practices of Ramadan. During Ramadan, government offices operate from 9:00 a.m. to 1:30 p.m., allowing employees to observe fasting and engage in religious activities.

In 2024, in a historic move, President Dr. Mohamed Muizzu declared the last ten days of Ramadan as official government holidays, starting from the 20th day of the month. This decision aims to foster Islamic values and encourage citizens to prioritize religious observances during this sacred period.

The government recognizes the need for continuous essential services and provides special allowances to employees required to work during the last ten days of Ramadan. These allowances compensate for work during official public holidays and acknowledge the contributions of essential workers.

== Economic measures and social welfare ==
To alleviate the financial burden on citizens during Ramadan, the Maldivian government implements several relief measures like:

Efforts are made to ensure that the prices of basic food items remain stable throughout the month.

Staple food items such as flour, rice, and sugar are distributed to the public as Ramadan gifts.

Discounts on electricity and water bills are provided to reduce household expenses during the fasting period.

== Economic and social impact ==
=== Tourism ===
Unlike many other Muslim-majority countries, the Maldives' tourism industry continues to operate as usual during Ramadan. While resorts operate normally, local islands adhere to stricter Islamic practices. Tourists are expected to respect fasting customs by avoiding public eating and drinking during daylight hours.

== See also ==
- Maahefun
- Maskurolhi
