= Maldives fish =

Cured tuna traditionally produced in Maldives

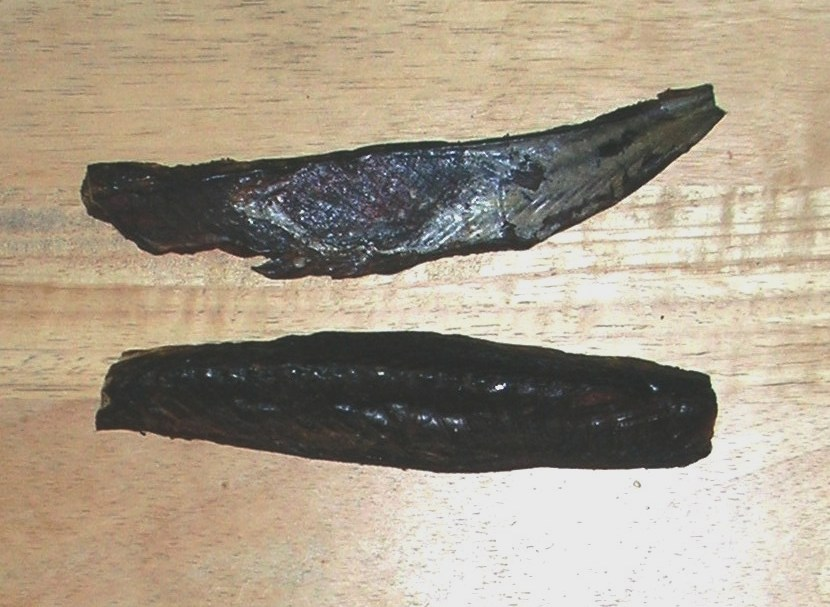
Two pieces (ari) of industrially-produced Maldives fish

Maldives fish (Dhivehi: ވަޅޯމަސް, romanized: valhoamas) is cured tuna traditionally produced in Maldives. It is a staple of the Maldivian cuisine, Sri Lankan cuisine, and the cuisine of the Southern Indian states and territories of Lakshadweep, Kerala and Tamil Nadu, and in the past it was one of the main exports from Maldives to Sri Lanka, where it is known as umbalakaḍa (උම්බලකඩ) in Sinhala and masikkaruvadu (மாசிக் கருவாடு) in Tamil. It is also produced in small scale using traditional methods in Lakshadweep Islands in India. It is known as massmin in Lakshadweep.

The abundant sea harvest of the Indian Ocean around the atolls of the Maldives and Lakshadweep in India yields many pelagic fishes, like skipjack, yellowfin tuna, little tunny (known locally as laṭṭi) and frigate mackerel. All these fish have been traditionally processed on the Maldive Islands as a main source of food as well as income for Maldivians.

== Processing method ==
On a good night, given a large shoal of bonito, the fishermen, using simple bamboo poles, catch about 600–1,000 fish in two to three hours, an average of one a minute.

Every fish is gutted, skinned and cut following a traditional pattern. The gills and some of the innards are thrown away. The head and backbone are removed, and the belly piece is separated. Then the fish is divided into four longitudinal pieces called ari. These long pieces can be cut into smaller sections (foti) in the case of large yellowfin tunas.

Next these pieces of tuna are processed by means of boiling, smoking and sun-drying until they acquire a wood-like appearance. Being dried in this manner, the fish can be kept indefinitely without refrigeration. This was important in the past, when there was no other way to preserve and store fish for Maldivians.

== Derived products ==
Historically, Maldives' fish used to be sold by the piece (ari)—a long fillet as hard as a block of wood.

Defective pieces were pounded with a huge mortar and pestle (a standard piece of local kitchen equipment) into fine splinters with a powdery consistency. The resulting product was traditionally used in Maldivian cuisine to flavour local dishes such as mas huni. The process of making Maldives fish produces a by-product called rihaakuru. This is made of stock remnant after the boiling of fish.

Maldives fish is widely used in Maldivian cuisine in dishes such as curries, mas huni, gulha and bōkiba.

== Use in Sri Lankan cuisine ==
Many Sri Lankan dishes, especially vegetable curries, also include Maldives fish, which acts as a thickening, flavouring and protein component. It is also an essential ingredient in coconut sambol, which is a staple of Sri Lankan cuisine. In other dishes it is used in small quantities that the flavor is just detectable, adding a certain umami character to the food. Maldives fish is the Sri Lankan answer to the shrimp pastes and fish sauces of South East Asia.

This powdered tuna is packed nowadays in small plastic packets, already pounded or crushed. Maldives fish is used in a number of Sri Lankan dishes, sometimes retaining its strong flavor as the main ingredient, like in sini sambal, which keeps indefinitely stored in an airtight jar.

== Use in Lakshadweep cuisine ==
Many dishes are made in Lakshadweep with Mass Min or Maldives Fish as it is called in Lakshadweep Islands in India. Maas Podichathu is a dish is made of mass min or dried tuna, cut into small pieces and mixed with coconut, turmeric powder, onions and garlic. This is had as a side dish along with rice. This dish is very similar to the Mas huni dish made in Maldives.

== See also ==
- List of dried foods
- List of tuna dishes
- Katsuobushi

== Bibliography ==
- Xavier Romero-Frias, Eating on the Islands, Himāl Southasian, Vol. 26 no. 2, pages 69–91 ISSN 1012-9804
