= Althaeus folkertsi =

Scientific classification
- Kingdom: Animalia
- Phylum: Arthropoda
- Class: Insecta
- Order: Coleoptera
- Suborder: Polyphaga
- Infraorder: Cucujiformia
- Family: Chrysomelidae
- Genus: Althaeus
- Species: A. folkertsi

Binomial name
- Althaeus folkertsi Kingsolver in Kingsolver, Gibb & Pfaffenberger, 1989

Species of beetle

Althaeus folkertsi, the velvetleaf seed beetle, is a species of leaf beetle in the family Chrysomelidae. It is found in North America.
