= World Heritage Cuisine Summit & Food Festival 2018 =

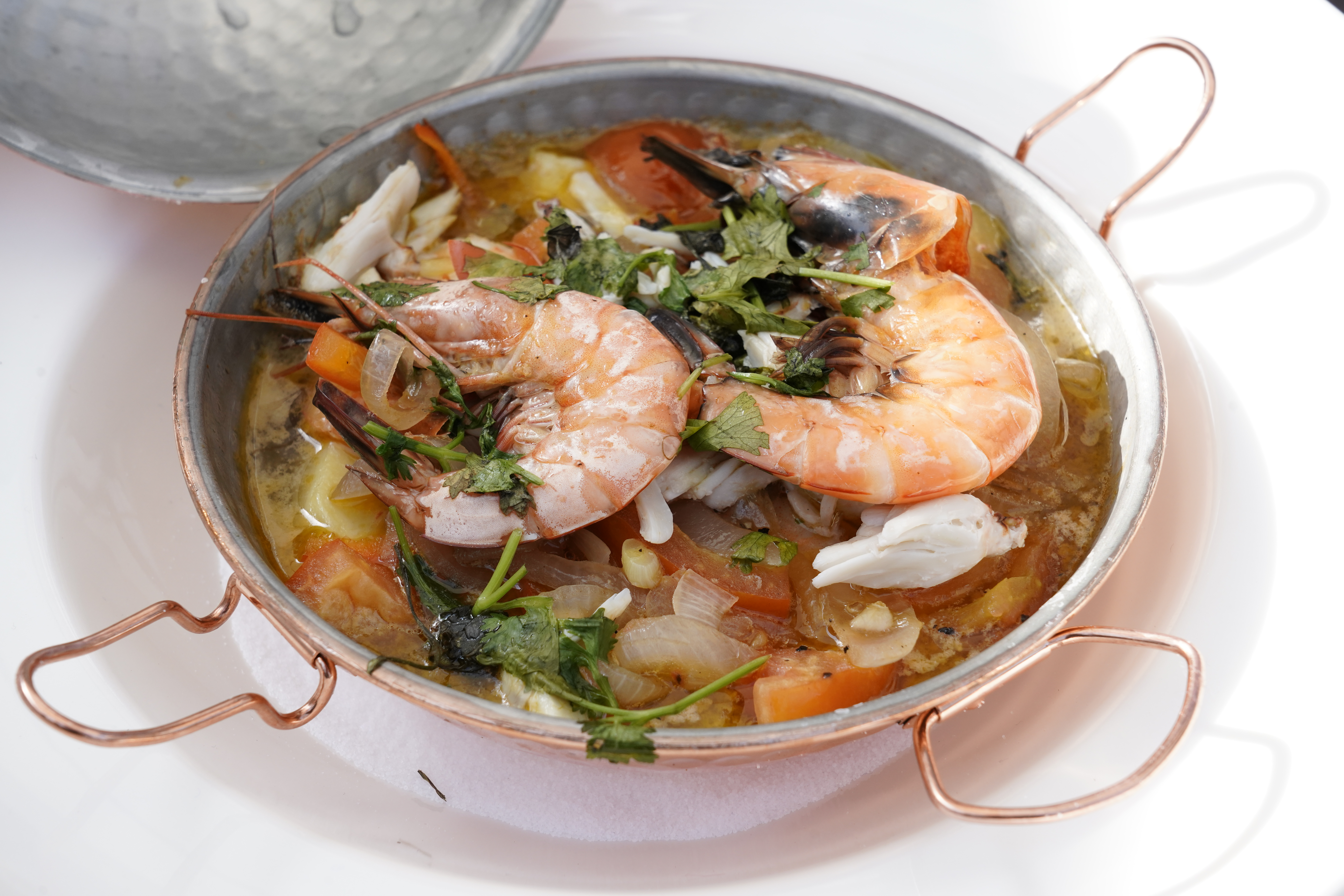
Seafood Cataplana at World Heritage Cuisine Summit & Food Festival 2018: the cataplana is a typical dish from Algarve, in Portugal.

Heritage Cuisine Summit & Food Festival 2018 was a food fest hosted by Indian Federation of Culinary Associations from 12 to 14 October 2018. The event was held at Qila Gobindgarh located in the center of Amritsar city in Punjab. Chefs from more than 40 countries and 20 different states of India attended the event.
