= Mas riha =

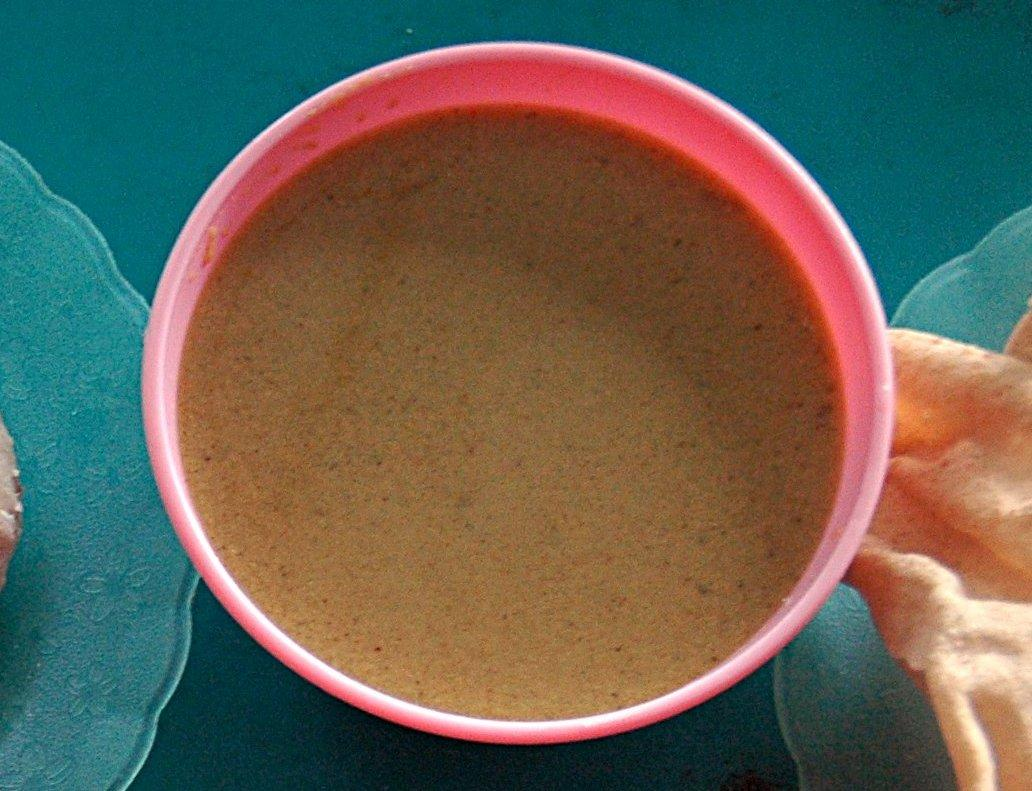
- Bowl of mas riha
- Type: Curry
- Place of origin: Maldives
- Region or state: South Asia
- Serving temperature: Hot with steamed rice or roshi
- Main ingredients: Tuna

Mas riha (Dhivehi: މަސް ރިހަ) is a fish curry of the Maldivian cuisine.

Mas riha is commonly eaten with steamed white rice, but when eaten for breakfast it is served with roshi flatbread and eaten along with hot tea.

== Preparation ==
This curry is usually cooked with fresh tuna, usually kaṇḍumas (skipjack tuna), but also kanneli (yellowfin tuna) or laṭṭi (little tunny). The fish is diced and cooked together over low fire with a mixture of fried onions and spices to which water is added. The curry is left to simmer for a while and coconut milk is added towards the end of the cooking process.

== See also ==
- List of tuna dishes
