= Shabana (Hejazi tradition) =

Celebration in western Saudi Arabia

- Observed by: Non-Arab immigrants
- Type: Immigrant traditions
- Significance: Haram in Islam
- Celebrations: Shabana, social gatherings, festive meals
- Date: 1 Sha'ban
- Started by: Non-Arab Immigrants in Makkah
- Related to: Ramadan, Sha'ban

Shabana is a traditional celebration undertaken by Non-Arab immigrants settled in the Hijaz in the mid-19th century. It is mainly held in Makkah. It is traced back to 70 years ago. The celebration is held by immigrants families by the end of the month of Sha'ban, that precedes the Holy Islamic month of Ramadan. In this event, ladies arrange a celebration where they wear special dresses and serve special kind of dishes. On the other hand, men arrange a picnic where they ride horses, fish or swim and this may last for more than one day. It is an innovation that is not permitted by Islamic law.

== Overview ==
Shabana is a Immigrants traditional celebration that celebrates the importance of Ramadan in Islam as they believe. It is meant as a time of enjoyment and recreation before the holy month of Ramadan. Friends and families gather, play public games, eat and do different recreational activities. The celebration also aims at strengthening ties between family members and settling any disputes.

Shabana usually takes place by the mid of Sha'ban, the eighth month of the Islamic calendar. Families gather, special traditional food is served and some traditional songs are played or said. Immigrants women and men wear their traditional outfits From their countries of origin and practice their traditional dance.

== Food ==
A number of traditional dishes are served in this event including, sambousa, mento, farmouza, baleela. Moreover, sweet dishes are also served such as, luddo, labaniah, debyazah, guraibah and others. It's all traditional food of East Asian countries .
