= Maskurolhi =

Maskurolhi is a coconut and tuna chutney eaten with baipen in the Maldives during Ramadan.

== See also ==
- Ramadan in Maldives
- Maahefun
