= Romanisation of Maldivian =

Representation of Maldivian with Latin letters

The representation of the Maldivian language in the Latin script varies from one scheme to another.

== Major romanization methods ==
The following are the major romanisation methods for Maldivian:

=== Malé Latin ===
Malé Latin is a romanisation for Maldivian used as the official script from 1976 to 1978. It continues to be the most used method of romanisation for the Maldivian Language.

=== ISO 15919 ===
ISO 15919 can be used to romanise Maldivian. Xavier Romero-Frias uses this scheme in his book The Maldive Islanders - A study of the popular culture of an ancient ocean kingdom.

== Table ==
=== Consonants ===
Thaana	Malé Latin	ISO 15919	IPA transcription
ހ	h	h	[h]
ށ	sh	ṣ	[ʂ]
ނ	n	n	[n]
ރ	r	r	[ɾ]
ބ	b	b	[b]
ޅ	l	ḷ	[ɭ]
ކ	k	k	[k]
ވ	v	v	[ʋ]
މ	m	m	[m]
ފ	f	f	[f]
ދ	dh	d	[d̪]
ތ	th	t	[t̪]
ލ	l	l	[l]
ގ	g	g	[ɡ]
ޏ	gn	ñ	[ɲ]
ސ	s	s	[s̺]
ޑ	d	ḍ	[ɖ]
ޒ	z	z	[z̺]
ޓ	t	ṭ	[ʈ]
ޔ	y	y	[j]
ޕ	p	p	[p]
ޖ	j	j	[dʒ]
ޗ	ch	c	[tʃ]

=== Vowels ===
Thaana	Malé Latin	ISO 15919	IPA transcription
އަ	a	a	[a]
އާ	aa	ā	[aː]
އި	i	i	[i]
އީ	ee	ī	[iː]
އު	u	u	[u]
އޫ	oo	ū	[uː]
އެ	e	e	[e]
އޭ	ey	ē	[eː]
އޮ	o	o	[o]
އޯ	oa	ō	[oː]
