= Xavier Romero Frías =

Spanish writer and scholar (born 1954)

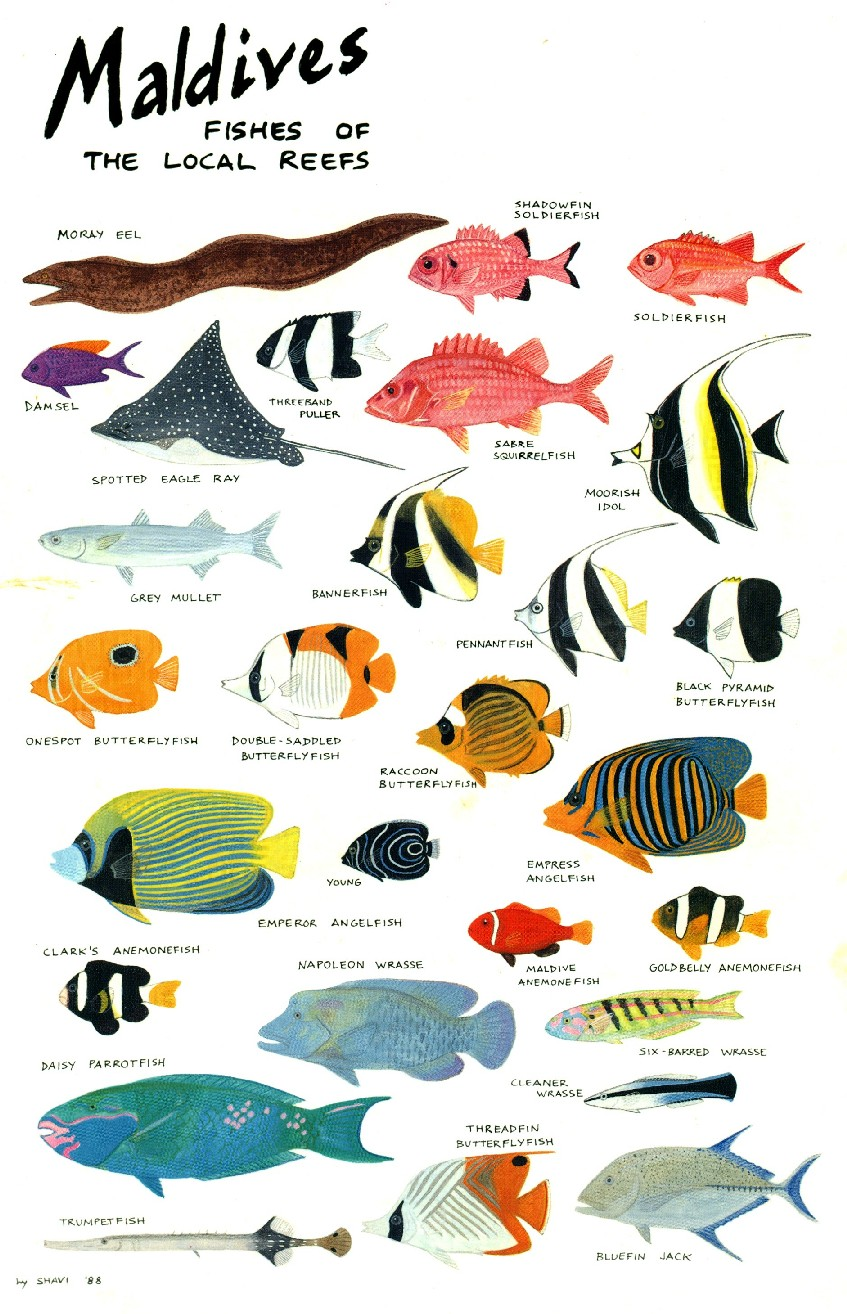
Fishes of Maldives

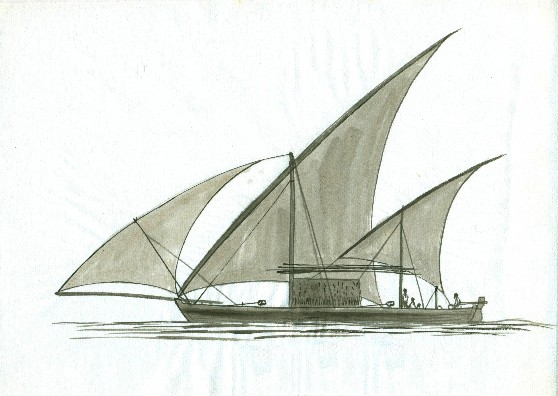
Boat of Maldives

Xavier Romero Frías (born 1954) is a Spanish writer and scholar. He lived among the Maldivians over a 13-year period. His present residence is in Bangkok, Thailand.

Xavier Romero Frías' books on local legends and traditions have been banned by the government of the Maldives.

== Works ==
Xavier Romero Frías investigated the folklore and oral tradition of the Maldives beginning in 1979. To achieve his goal he learned two dialects of the Maldivian language fluently and understood well others, gaining also deep knowledge of the Maldivian writing systems and Arabic. During his years in the Maldives, Romero Frías took a special interest in compiling the traditions of the Maldives by becoming friendly with the elders of the islands he visited. Before Romero Frías did this work, very few of the Maldivian stories and legends were in written form.

Romero Frías completed the English translation of about hundred Maldivian legends and tales about local ghosts and semi-historical myths from many atolls of the Maldives, but mainly from the South of Maldives and from Male. After this he lived twelve years in India studying Sanskrit and researching the origins of the Maldivian cultural heritage. During this time he published a monograph with his research on the Maldivian ancestral identity. This monograph was published as The Maldive Islanders, A Study of the Popular Culture of an Ancient Ocean Kingdom. Another publication released in 2012 is Folk tales of the Maldives, a compilation of folk tales illustrated by the author.

According to Sri Lankan scholar Rohan Gunaratna, Romero Frías "followed the steps of British scholar HCP Bell." Roland Silva, the Director of the Archaeology Department of Sri Lanka between 1983 and 1992 compared the pioneering work of Romero Frías with that of Henry Parker, a British anthropologist who compiled the folk tales of the villages of Sri Lanka around 1880. Romero Frías gave lectures at the University of Madras in the 1980s invited by Professor V. Sudarsan, head of the Department of Anthropology. During the past thirty years, he has written many articles and commentaries, as well as given lectures on Maldivian traditional Islam, religious syncretism and the causes of Islamic terrorism.

As an artist he has illustrated books for the EDC (Educational Development Center) of the Ministry of Education in Malé, the Maldives, and painted the fish as well as the legends of the Maldives and the sailboats of previous times. There was an exhibition of some of his works in Vienna, Austria, in 1987.

== Quote ==
Regarding the difficulty for Maldivians to wholeheartedly embrace their own national identity, Romero Frías wrote, "In every Maldivian mind there is a sharp struggle between inherited customs and Muslim ideology. Since this conflict remains unresolved, there is a widespread feeling of guilt and frustration at being unable to adjust the ancestral cultural heritage to the Islamic ideological pattern."

== See also ==
- Maldivian folklore

== Sources ==
- Xavier Romero Frías at Academia.edu
- Maldives ethnography List of books
- "Open Letter to Maldivians: The Maldives: From Charybdis to Scylla?" Dhivehi Observer 9 December 2005
- Blasco, Roge (2000) "Xavier Romero: Tras las leyendas perdidas de las islas Maldivas" Gara 3 September 2000
- Husna Razee, 'Being a Good Woman': Suffering and Distress through the voices of women in the Maldives
- Scott M. Fitzpatrick, Seafaring simulations and the origin of prehistoric settlers to Madagascar
- Hasan Amir, Islamism and radicalism in the Maldives
