= Tuna fish sandwich =

Type of sandwich

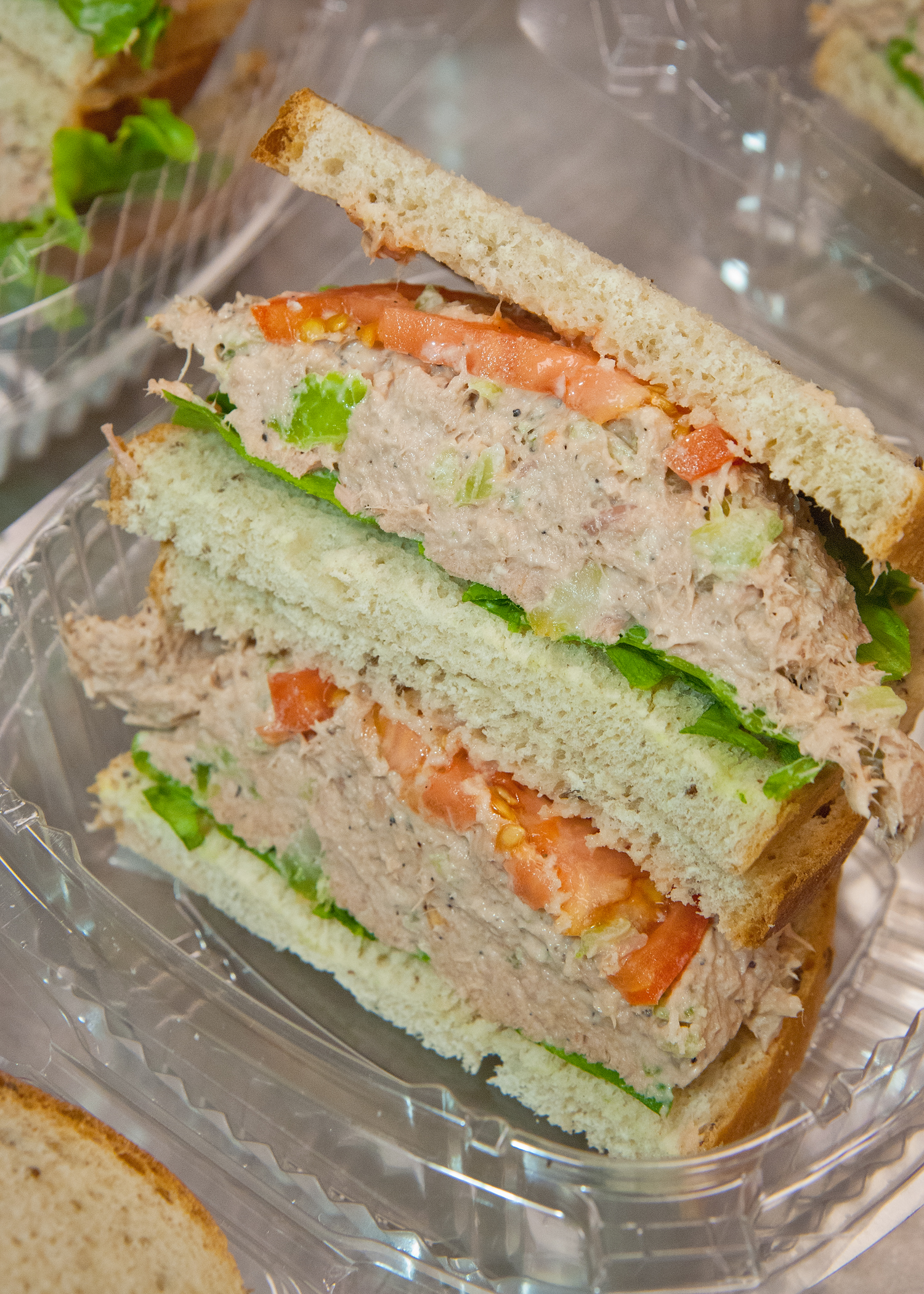
- Tuna fish sandwich
- Alternative names: Tuna salad sandwich, tuna sandwich
- Type: Sandwich
- Course: Lunch
- Place of origin: Various
- Main ingredients: Tuna salad, mayonnaise
- Ingredients generally used: Celery, onion, lettuce, tomato
- Variations: Tuna boat, tuna melt

A tuna fish sandwich, also known as a tuna salad sandwich or a tuna sandwich, is a sandwich made from canned tuna—usually made into a tuna salad by adding mayonnaise, and sometimes other ingredients such as celery or onion—as well as other common vegetables used to flavour sandwiches. It is commonly served on sliced bread.

Variations include the tuna boat (served on a bun or roll) and the tuna melt (served with melted cheese).

In the United States, 52 percent of canned tuna is used for sandwiches. The tuna sandwich has been called "the mainstay of almost everyone's American childhood."

== History ==
The dish's popularity started to climb in the early twentieth century, but tuna sandwiches were already being served in nineteenth-century homes. In 1893, Dell Montjoy Bradley, a New York socialite, wrote a gourmet cookbook called Beverages and Sandwiches for Your Husband's Friends. She included a recipe for a sandwich made out of imported tuna that she described using the Italian word "tonno."

The sandwich is "emblematic of America’s working-class spirit" and its status "rests on three post–Industrial Revolution convenience foods: canned tuna, presliced wheat bread, and mayonnaise," according to James Beard Foundation Award winner Mari Uyehara. Canning of tuna began in the United States around 1904, and it was increasingly popular as a lower-cost alternative to canned salmon by the 1920s. German immigrant Richard Hellmann began mass-producing mayonnaise, the other major ingredient of tuna salad, in New York City around 1905, for use by commercial food service businesses. By 1912, he was selling wide-mouthed glass jars of mayonnaise to retail customers, under the brand name Hellmann's. Commercial sliced bread was introduced in the United States in 1928, was sold nationally by 1930 and accounted for the majority of U.S. bread sales by 1933.

Reuben Swinburne Clymer was the grand master of Fraternitas Rosae Crucis, an American Rosicrucian organization from 1922 to 1966. He was an advocate of a pescatarian or fish/vegetarian diet. In 1917, he co-authored The Rose Cross Aid Cook Book with Clara Witt. The book included a recipe for seafood sandwiches, including variations for canned salmon, canned shrimp and canned tuna. The seafood was removed from the can, placed on slices of buttered bread spread with a teaspoon of mayonnaise, and a lettuce leaf was added. An institutional cookbook published in 1924 included a recipe for making a batch of 50 tuna sandwiches. The recipe included canned tuna, chopped celery and boiled dressing, an alternative to mayonnaise. The tuna salad was served between slices of buttered bread.

Demand for canned tuna in the 1930s was heavier than supply could keep up with. During World War II, the Office of Price Administration required restaurants in the New York City metropolitan area to prominently post prices of 40 "basic food items". Among them was a "Tuna Fish Salad Sandwich". Canned tuna became more plentiful in the United States in the late 1940s. In 1950, 8,500,000 pounds of canned tuna were produced, and the U.S. Department of Agriculture classified it as a "plentiful food".

In 2021, Subway was sued by two California consumers who claimed that the fast-food chain had sold purported tuna sandwiches that were "completely bereft of tuna as an ingredient". A representative of the company which operates over 40,000 locations worldwide, denied the allegations, saying "These claims are meritless,” adding “Tuna is one of our most popular sandwiches. Our restaurants receive 100% wild-caught tuna, mix it with mayonnaise and serve on a freshly made sandwich." The investigative TV show Inside Edition sent samples of Subway's tuna salad to Applied Food Technologies, a Florida company that carries out DNA testing of seafood. According to that company, "Yes, we confirmed that tuna was definitely in all three samples we received".

== Ingredients ==
A tuna fish sandwich is usually made with canned tuna mixed with mayonnaise and other additions, such as chopped celery, capers, pickles or pickle relish, hard-boiled eggs, onion, cucumber, sweetcorn or black olives. Other recipes may use olive oil, Miracle Whip, salad cream, mustard, or yogurt, instead of or in addition to mayonnaise. The sandwich may be topped with lettuce, tomato, cucumbers, bean sprouts, or avocado in any combination.

== Variations ==
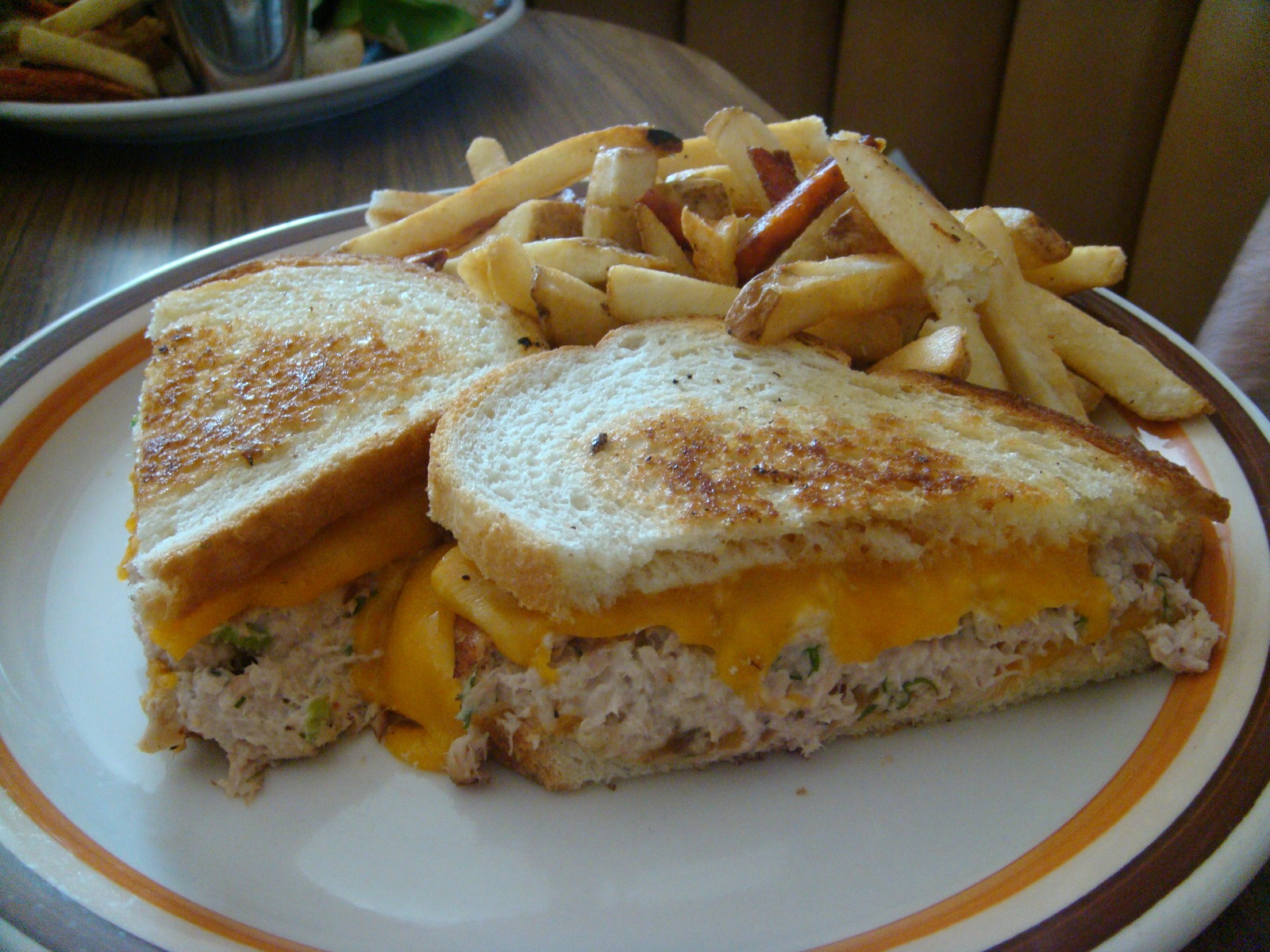
A tuna melt sandwich served with French fries

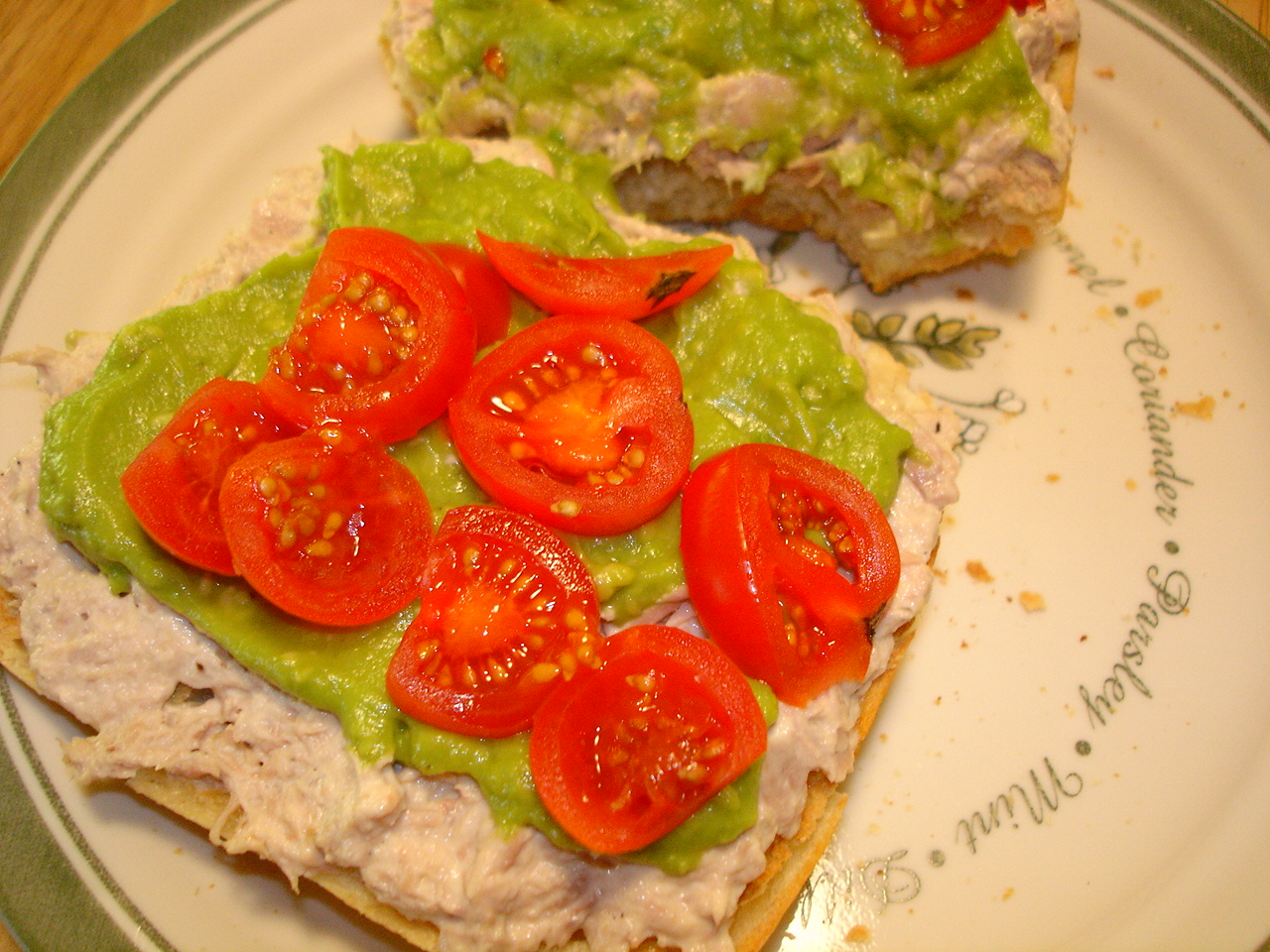
An open tuna fish sandwich with guacamole and cherry tomatoes

- A tuna melt has melted cheese on top of the tuna or on a tomato slice and is served on toasted bread. The New York Times published a recipe for this variation in 1951, which it called a "Tuna sandwich au gratin". In 2020, U.S. Senators Mark Warner and Kamala Harris debated methods of preparing a tuna melt, with Warner advocating a quick microwave oven technique, while Harris took a more complex gourmet approach. Ina Garten is a 21st-century American chef who is fond of tuna melts using gourmet ingredients.
- A tuna boat is a tuna fish sandwich served in a hot dog bun or long-split bread roll.
- A grilled tuna sandwich is based on fresh tuna instead of canned tuna. In 2001, Cindy Pawlcyn published a recipe for an ahi tuna sandwich, consisting of a grilled ahi tuna steak served on a poppyseed bun. California based restaurant chain The Habit Burger Grill serves a grilled ahi tuna filet sandwich at its over 300 restaurants.

== Nutrition ==
Tuna is a relatively high protein food and it is very high in omega-3 fatty acids. A sandwich made from 100 grams of tuna and two slices of toasted white bread has approximately 287 kilocalories, 96 of which are from fat (10.5 grams fat). It also has 20 grams of protein and 27 grams of carbohydrates.

A larger, commercially prepared tuna fish sandwich has more calories than noted above, based on its serving size. A 6-inch Subway tuna sub of 238 grams has 480 kilocalories, 210 of those from fat, 600 milligrams of sodium, and 20 grams of protein.

== See also ==
- List of American sandwiches
- List of fish dishes
- List of tuna dishes
- List of sandwiches
- Skipjack tuna
