= Tuna salad =

Fish salad with mayonnaise sauce

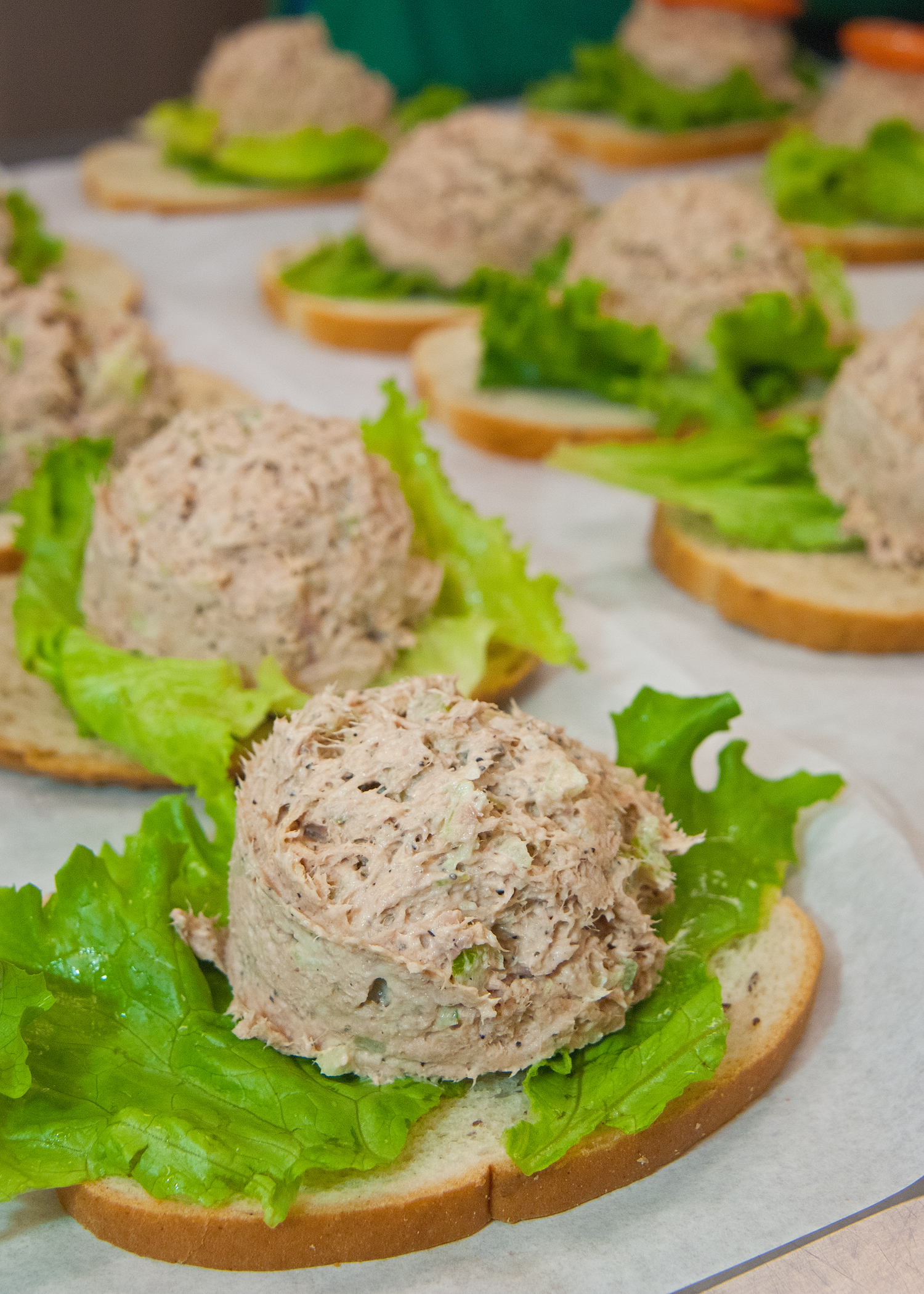
- Tuna salad sandwiches being assembled
- Type: Salad
- Main ingredients: Tuna, mayonnaise

Tuna salad is a salad dish consisting of tuna and mayonnaise. The tuna used is usually pre-cooked, canned, and packaged in water or oil. Pickles, celery, relish, and onion are popular ingredients to add. Tuna salad is used to make tuna fish sandwiches; it can also be served on top of crackers, lettuce, tomato, or avocado (or else served by itself).

== History ==
The first written reference to tuna salad, in Russia, appeared in 1876, and by 1893, dozens of recipes had been published. Tuna salad, especially with celery, is similar to chicken salad while also being more convenient (due to the use of canned tuna), a fact that helped its early rise in popularity.

Due to the high nutritional content of tuna salad, it assumed the reputation of a diet food in the 1960s.

== Dishes ==
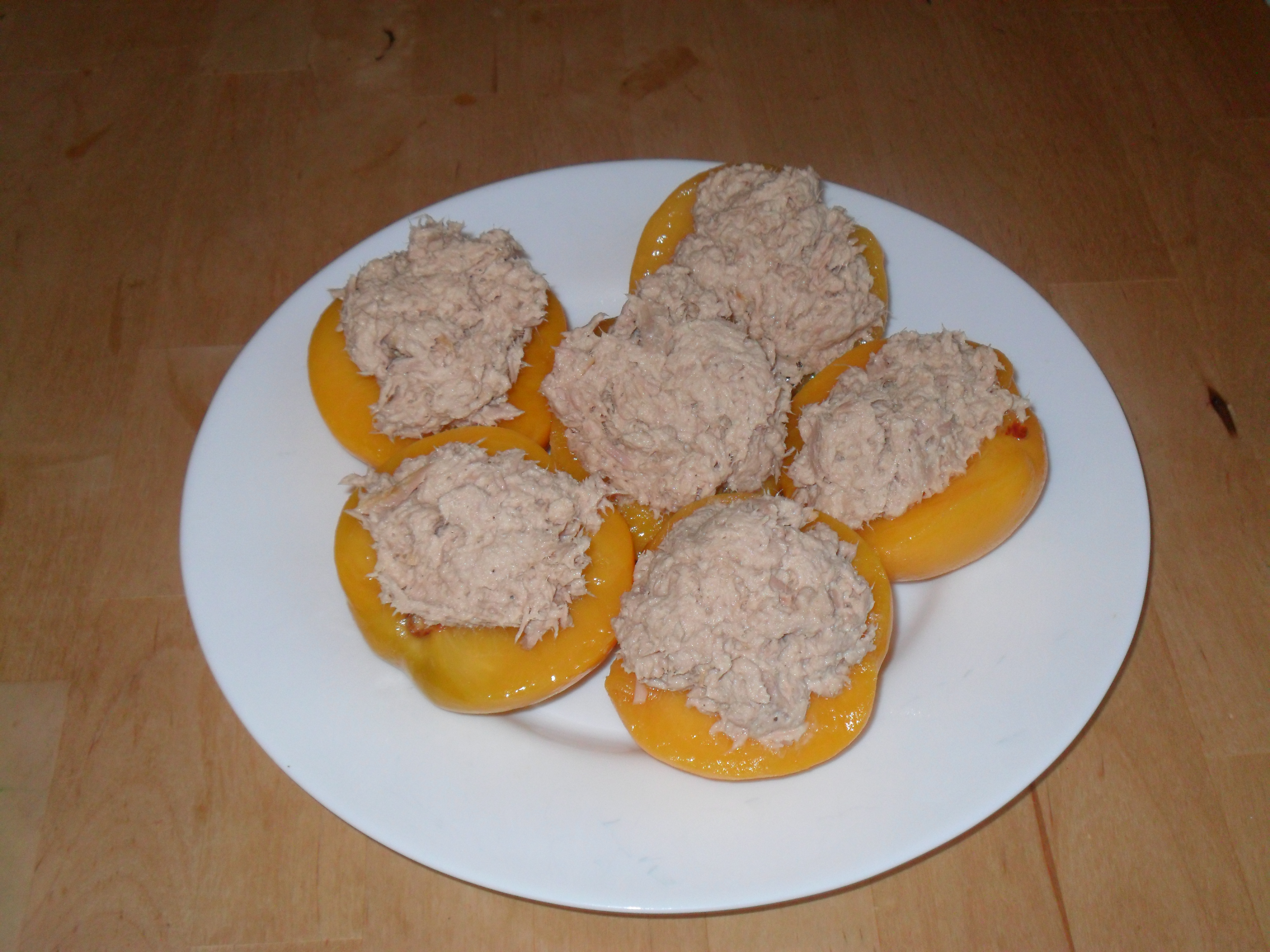
Pêches au thon (peaches with tuna)

In the United States, tuna salad is often considered its own dish. However, it may be added to noodles with its standard ingredients (onions, mayonnaise, and celery) to make a tuna pasta salad. Tuna salad is also commonly seen in American salad bars.

In Belgium, the dish pêches au thon/perziken met tonijn ('peaches with tuna') is made from halved canned or fresh peaches stuffed with tuna salad. It is widespread throughout the country, and, due to its ease of preparation, it is common fare at potlucks.

== See also ==
- Egg salad
- Niçoise salad
- List of salads
- List of tuna dishes
