= List of tuna dishes =

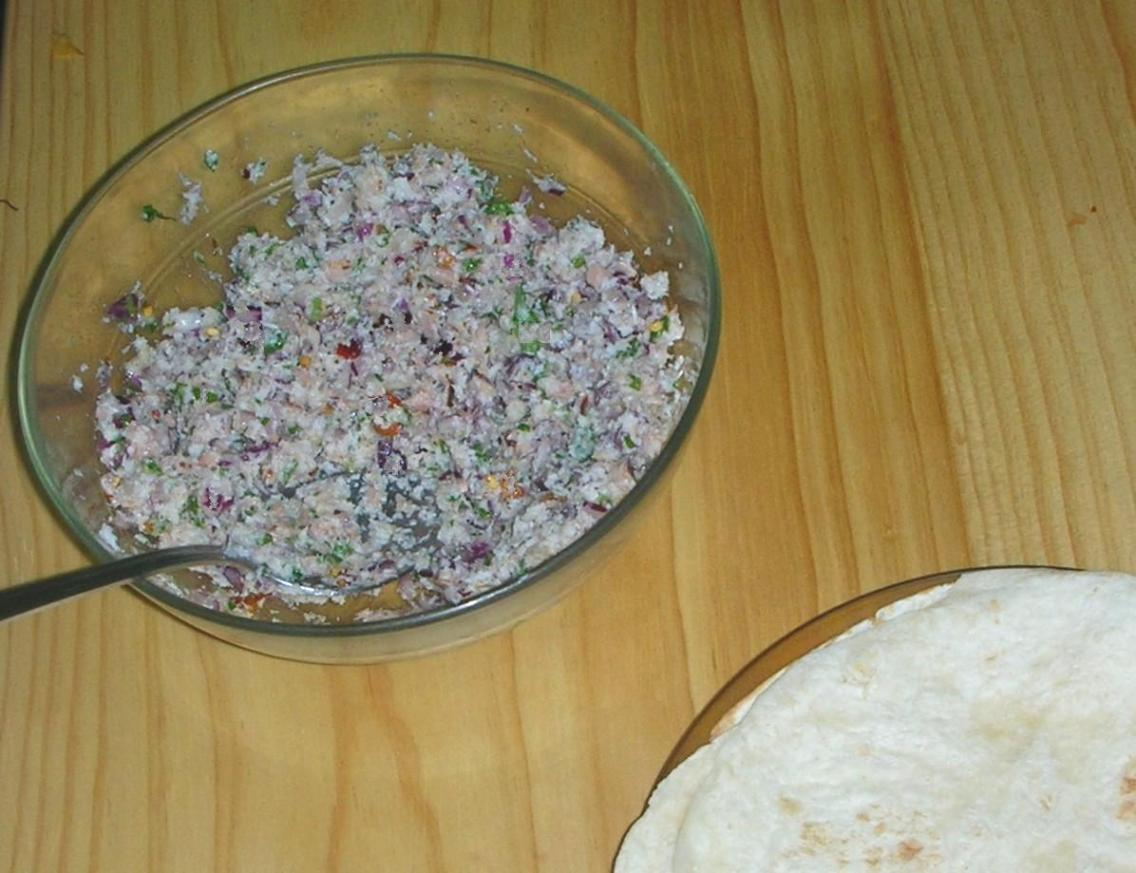
Mas huni (top) with chapati flatbread

This is a list of notable tuna dishes, consisting of foods and dishes prepared using tuna as a primary ingredient. Tuna is a versatile ingredient that is used in a variety of dishes, including entrees, sandwiches, sushi, salads, appetizers, soups and spreads, among others.

== Tuna dishes ==
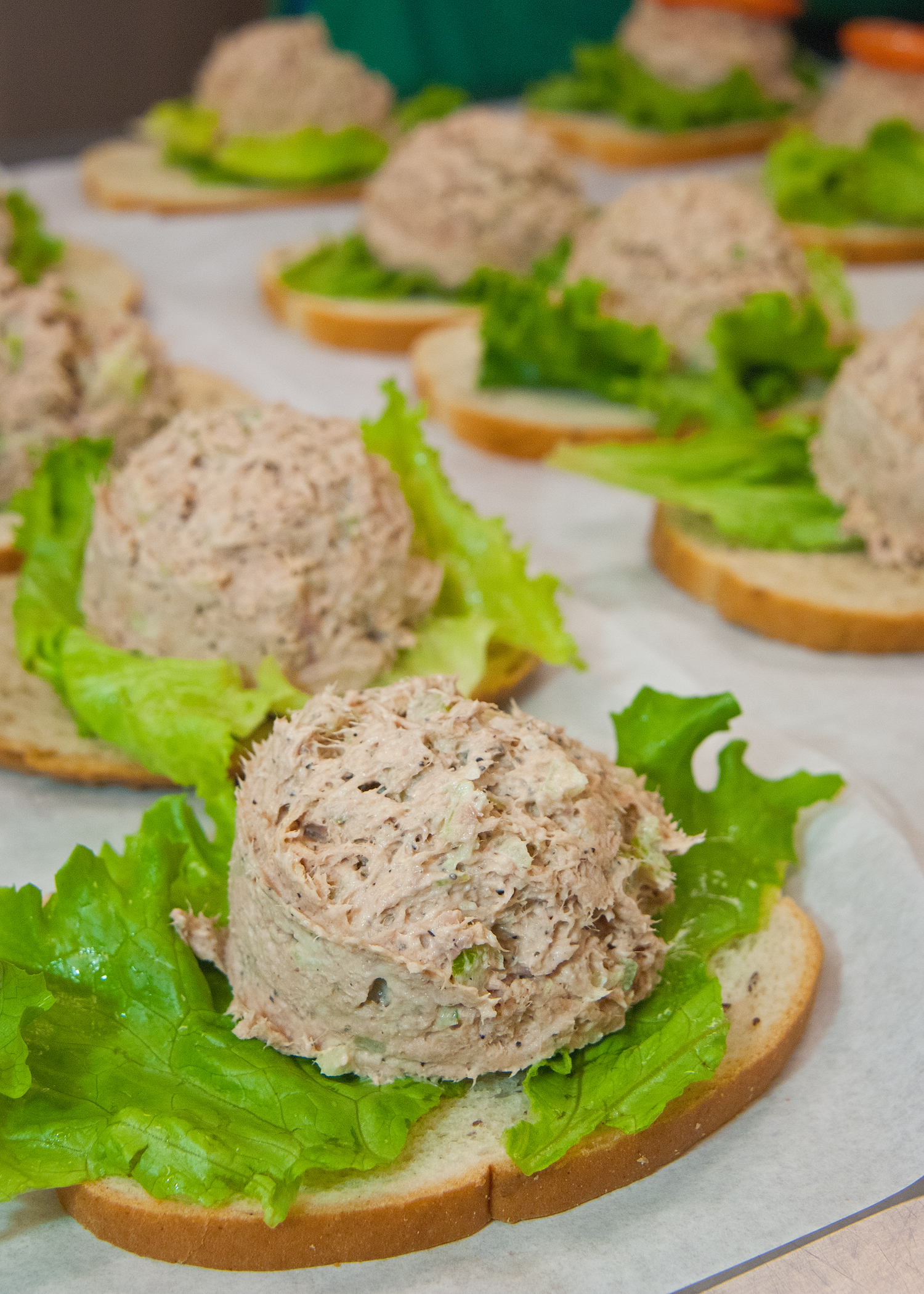
Open-faced tuna fish sandwiches prepared using tuna salad

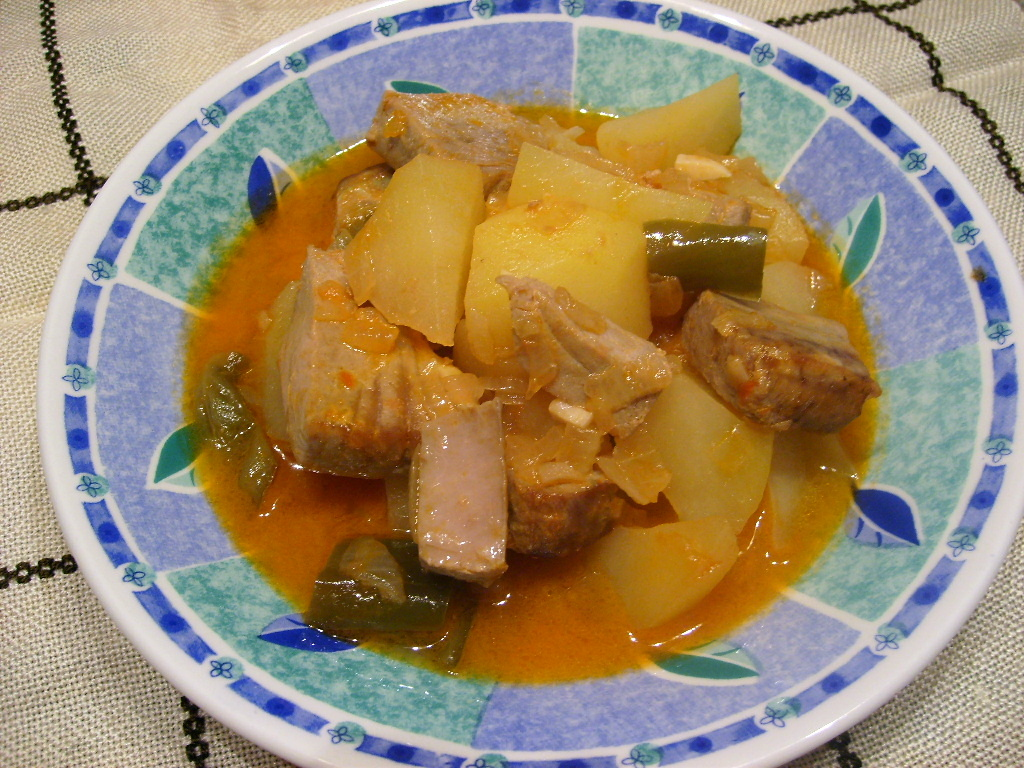
Tuna pot

- Cakalang fufu – cured and smoked skipjack tuna clipped on a bamboo frame, a Minahasan delicacy of North Sulawesi, Indonesia.
- Garudhiya – a clear fish broth, it is one of the basic and traditional food items of Maldivian cuisine. The broth is based on tuna species found in the nation's ocean waters such as skipjack (kanḍumas or goḍa), yellowfin tuna (kanneli), little tunny (lațți), or frigate tuna) (raagonḍi).
- Gulha – a Maldivian snack food, gulha consists of small ball-shaped dumplings that are stuffed with a mixture of tuna, finely chopped onion, grated coconut, lime juice and chili pepper.
- Kandu kukulhu – also known as tuna curry, it is a traditional Maldivian dish consisting of tuna fillets rolled with spices and cooked in coconut milk.
- Maldives fish – a cured tuna fish traditionally produced in Maldives, it is a staple of the Maldivian cuisine, Sri Lankan cuisine, as well as the cuisine of the Southern Indian states and territories of Lakshadweep, Kerala and Tamil Nadu.
- Mas huni – a typical Maldivian breakfast composed of tuna, onion, coconut, and chili pepper.
- Mas riha – a fish curry of Maldivian cuisine, it is commonly eaten with steamed white rice, but when eaten for breakfast it is served with roshi flatbread and eaten along with hot tea.
- Mie cakalang – a Minahasan cuisine of skipjack tuna noodle soup.
- Mojama – a Mediterranean delicacy consisting of filleted salt-cured tuna, typical from Huelva and Cádiz (Spain)
- Negitoro – Japanese dish of minced ground meat of raw tuna fish, usually served as part of sushi or rice bowl.
- Rihaakuru – A Maldivian thick food paste produced as a by-product of the processing of tuna.
- Salade niçoise – freshly cooked or canned tuna is sometimes used in this salad that originated in the French city of Nice.
- Tekkadon – a type of donburi (a rice bowl dish consisting of fish, meat, vegetables or other ingredients simmered together and served over rice), tekkadon is a Japanese dish topped with thin-sliced raw tuna sashimi.
- Tuna casserole – a casserole primarily made with pasta (or rice) and canned tuna, with canned peas and corn sometimes added.
- Tuna fish sandwich – a sandwich made from canned tuna, usually made into a tuna salad, which is then used as the sandwich's main ingredient.
- Tuna Helper – a packaged food product from General Mills, sold as part of the Betty Crocker brand. It consists of boxed dried pasta, with the seasonings contained in a powdered sauce packet. Tuna is added to complete the meal.
- Tuna pot – referred to as marmitako in Basque Country and marmita, marmite or sorropotún in Cantabria, it is a fish stew that was eaten on tuna fishing boats in the Cantabrian Sea.
- Tuna roll – a type of makizushi (rolled sushi) prepared using raw tuna, sushi rice and nori.
- Tuna salad – typically consisting of cooked tuna and mayonnaise as key ingredients, various other ingredients are also sometimes used, such as onion and celery, among others.
- "Kinunot" na Isdang Tuna (Bikol word "kunot" - flaking, shred) is a traditional Bicolano cuisine with a combination of yellowfin tuna, malunggay, siling labuyo and coconut milk.

== Gallery ==
Various tuna dishes

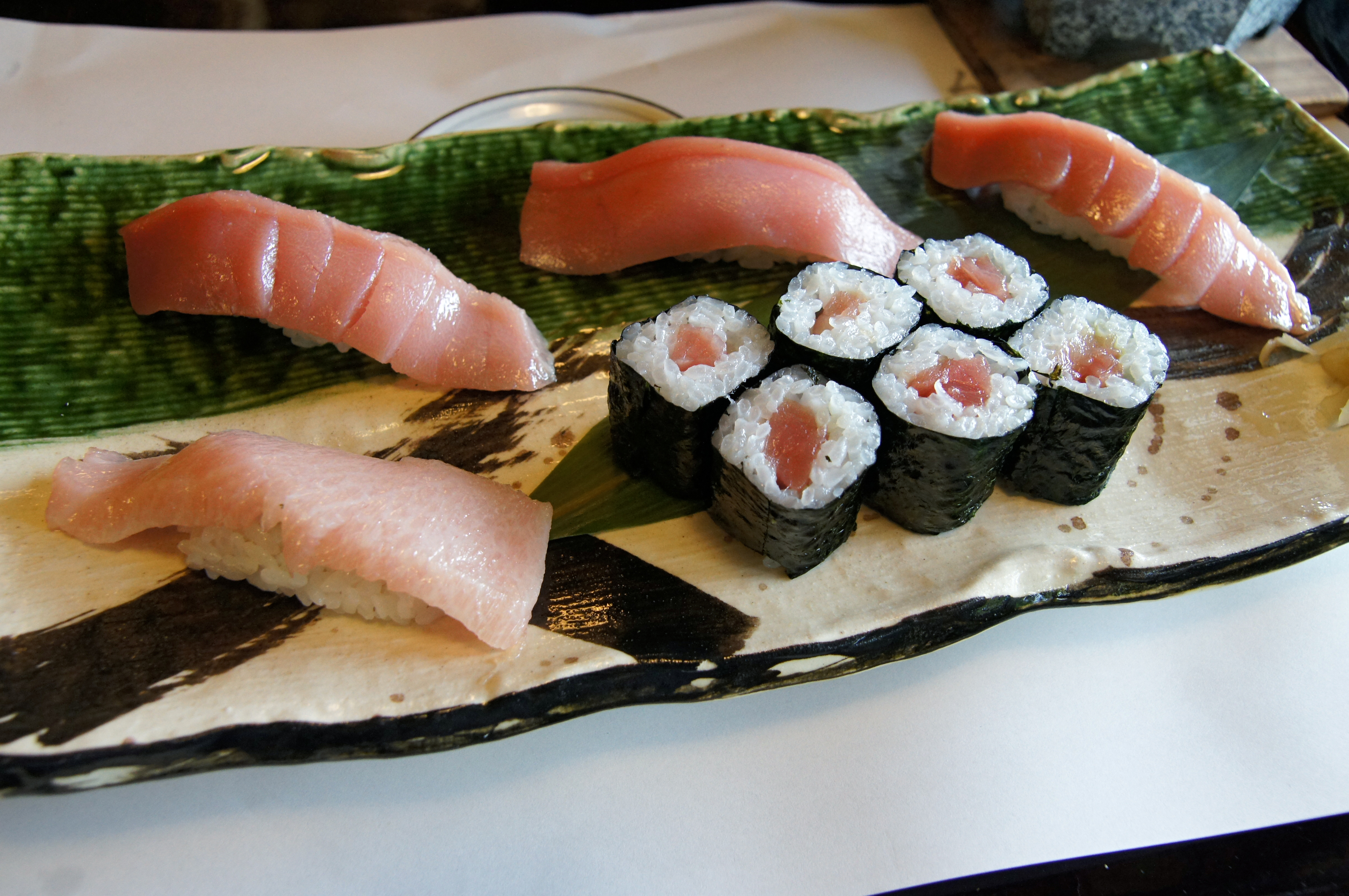
Sushi

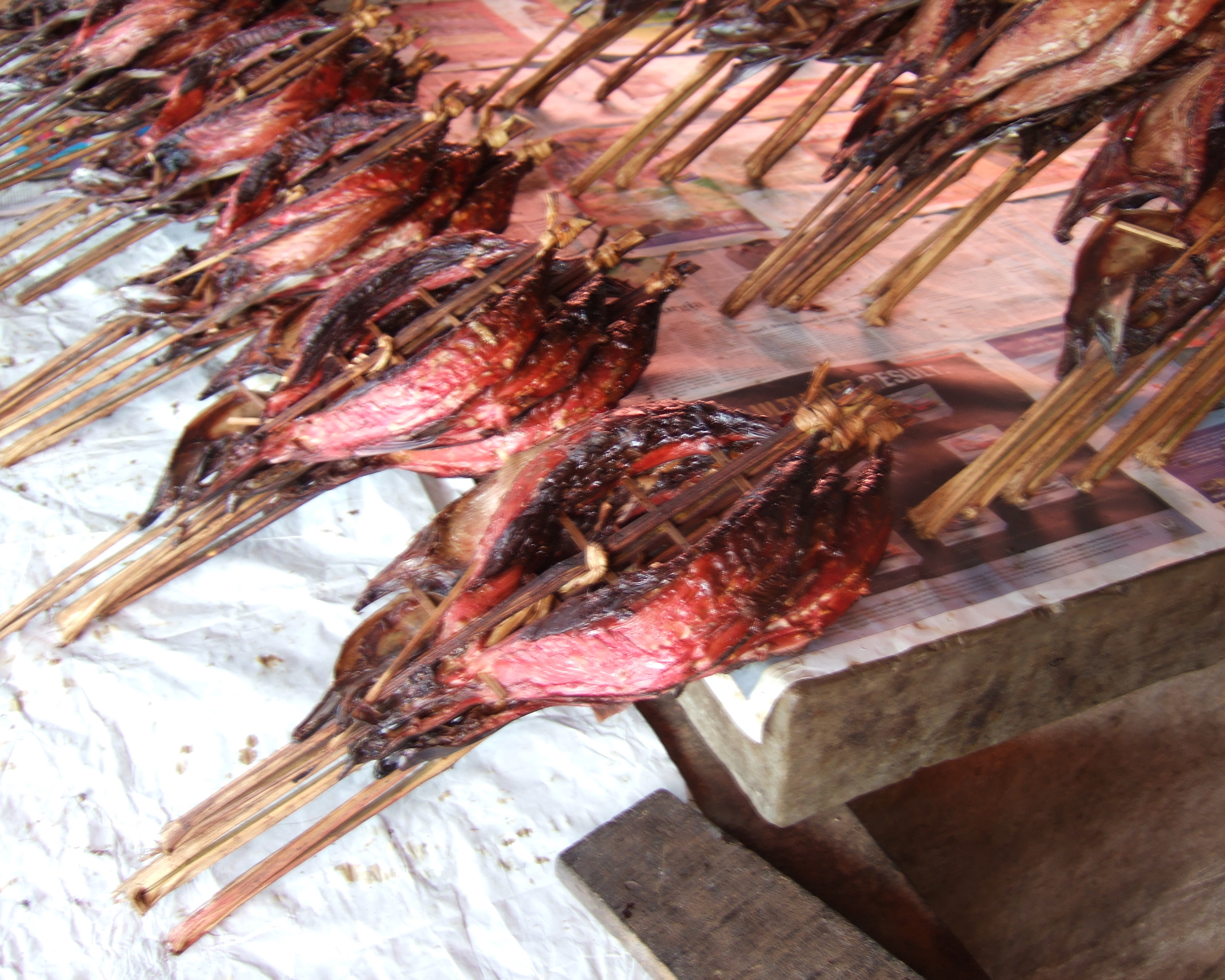
Cakalang fufu

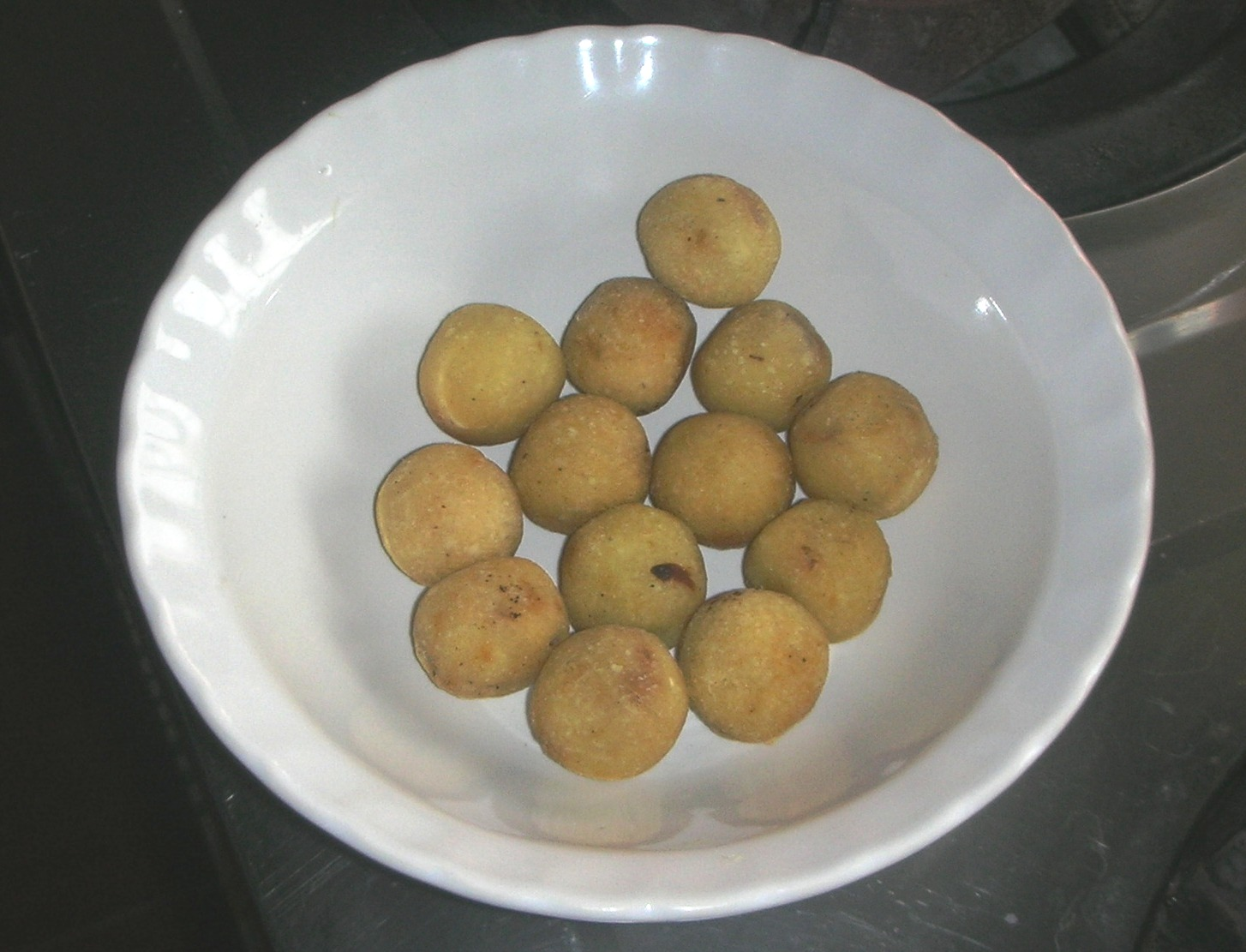
Gulha

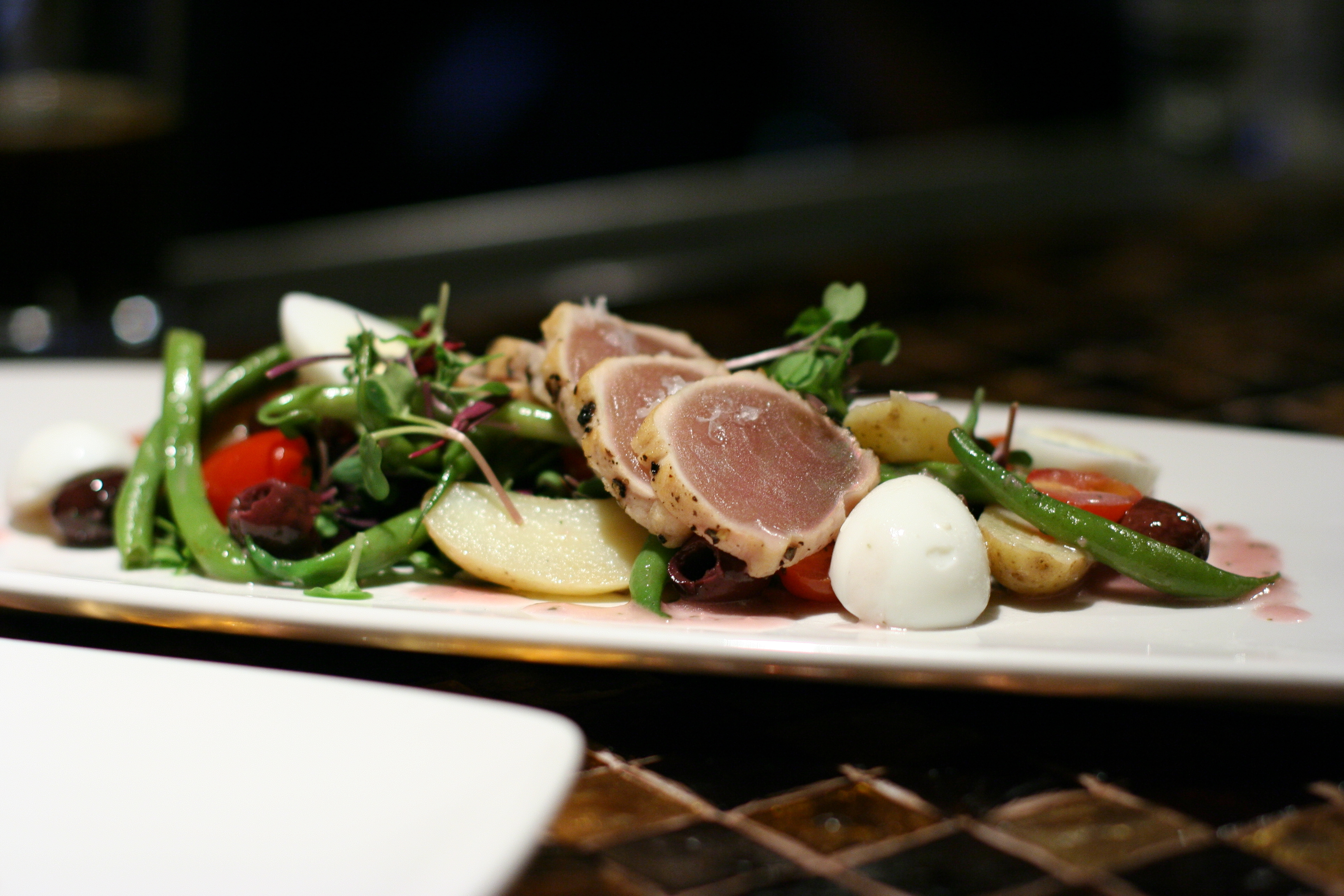
Seared albacore in a salade niçoise

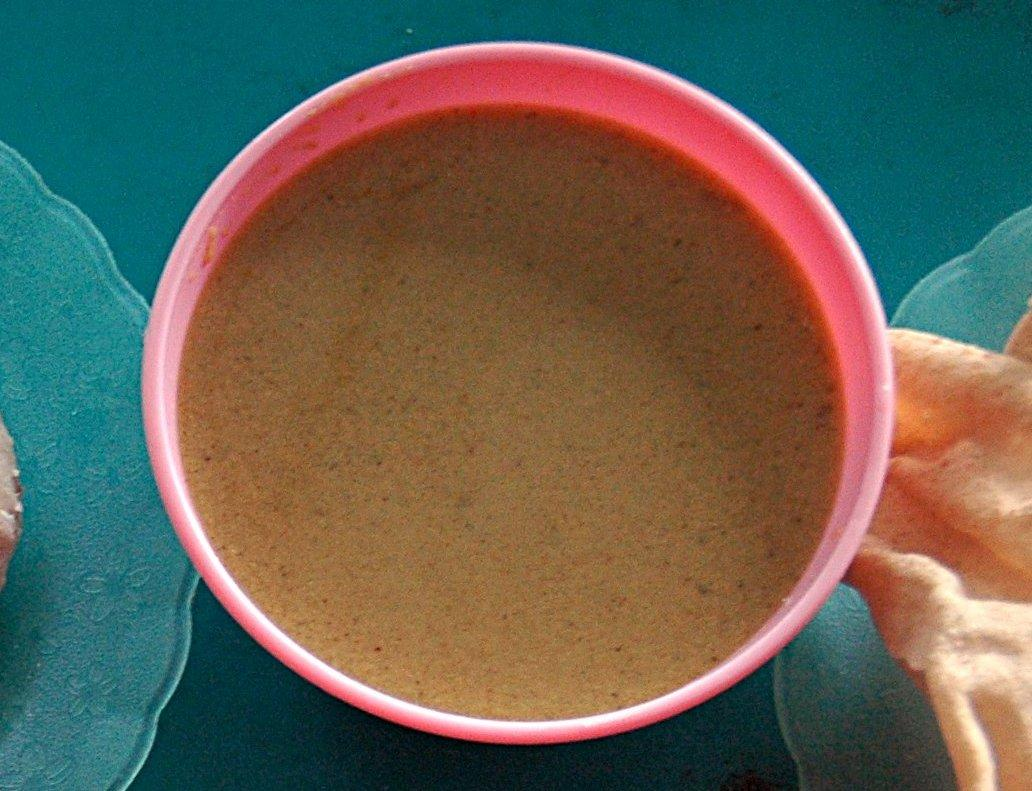
Mas riha

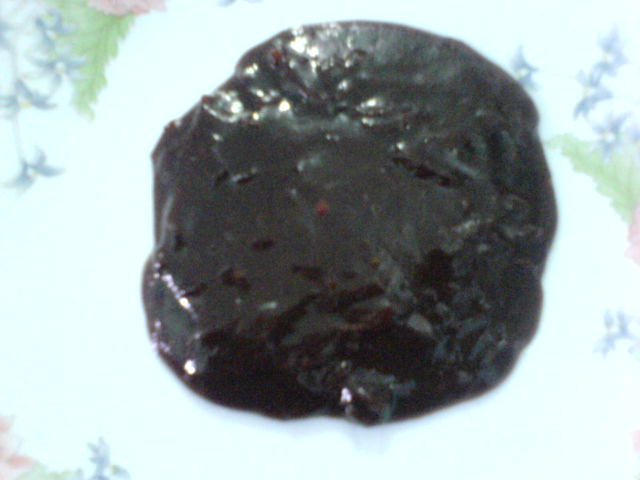
Rihaakuru, a food paste

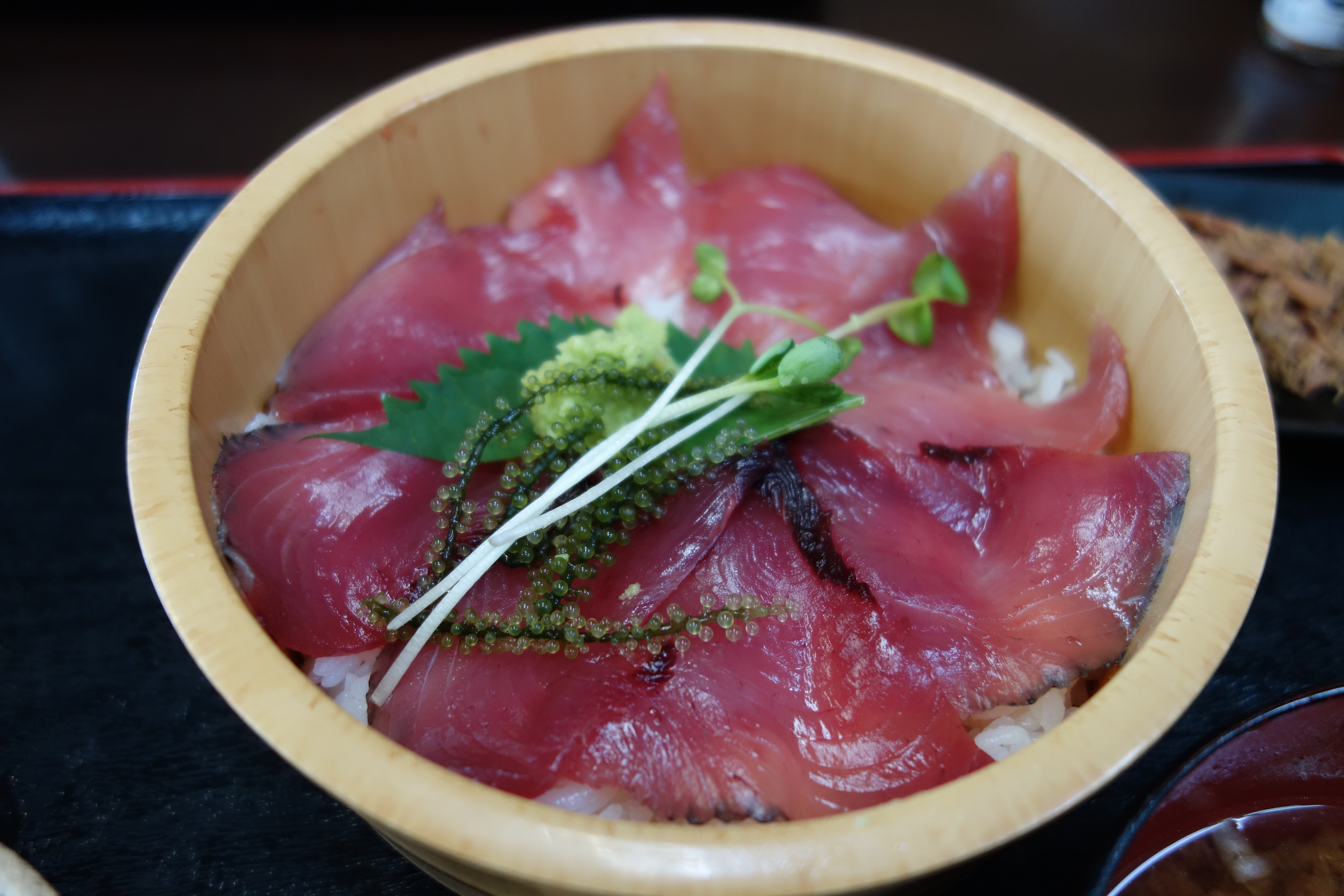
Tekkadon

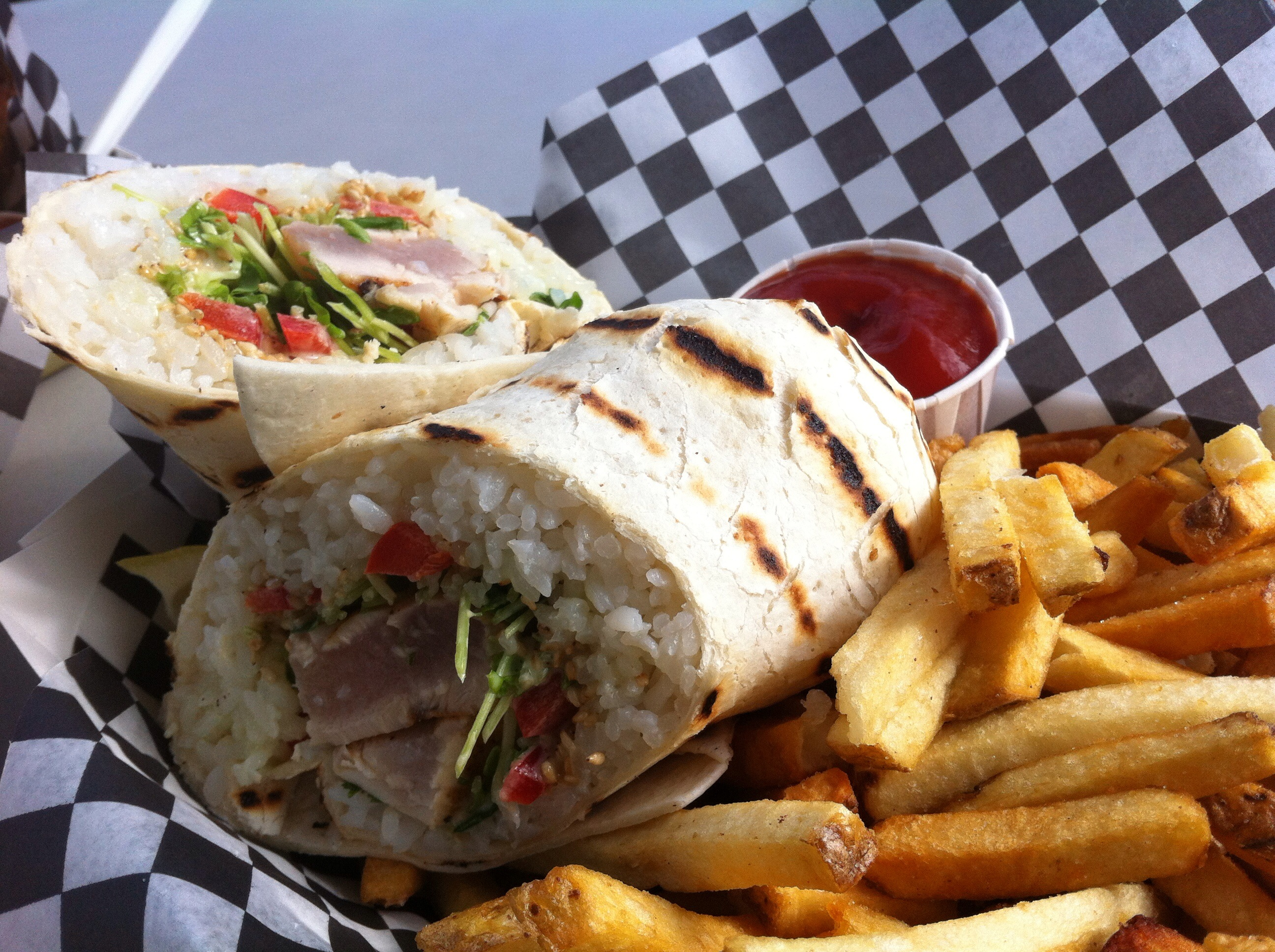
Albacore in a rice wrap

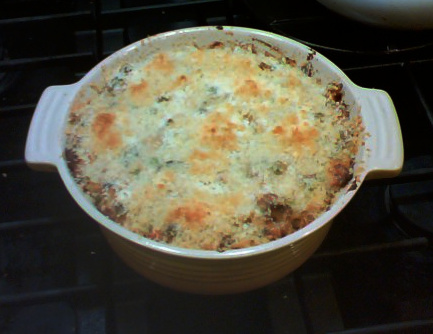
Tuna casserole

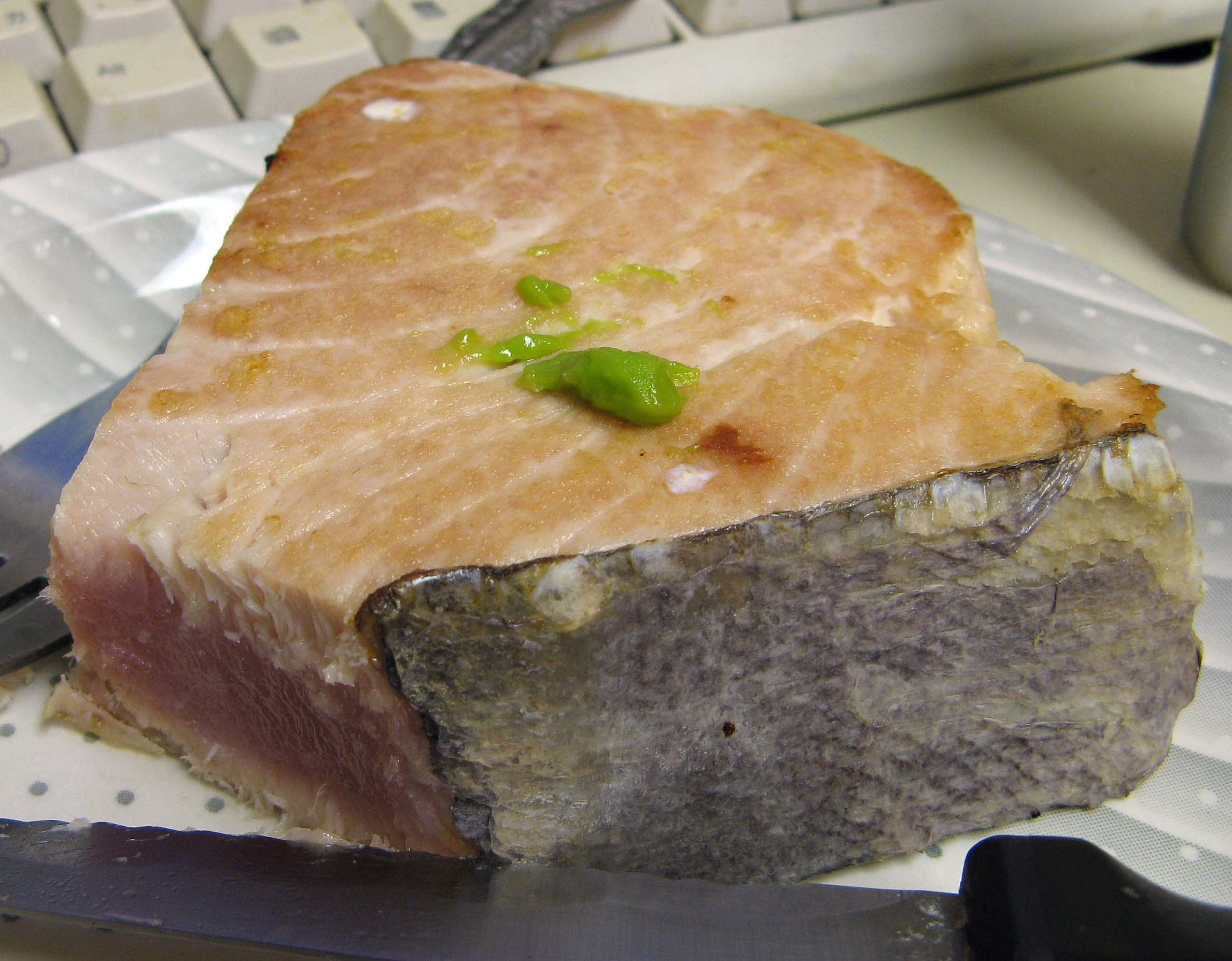
Lightly cooked albacore steak

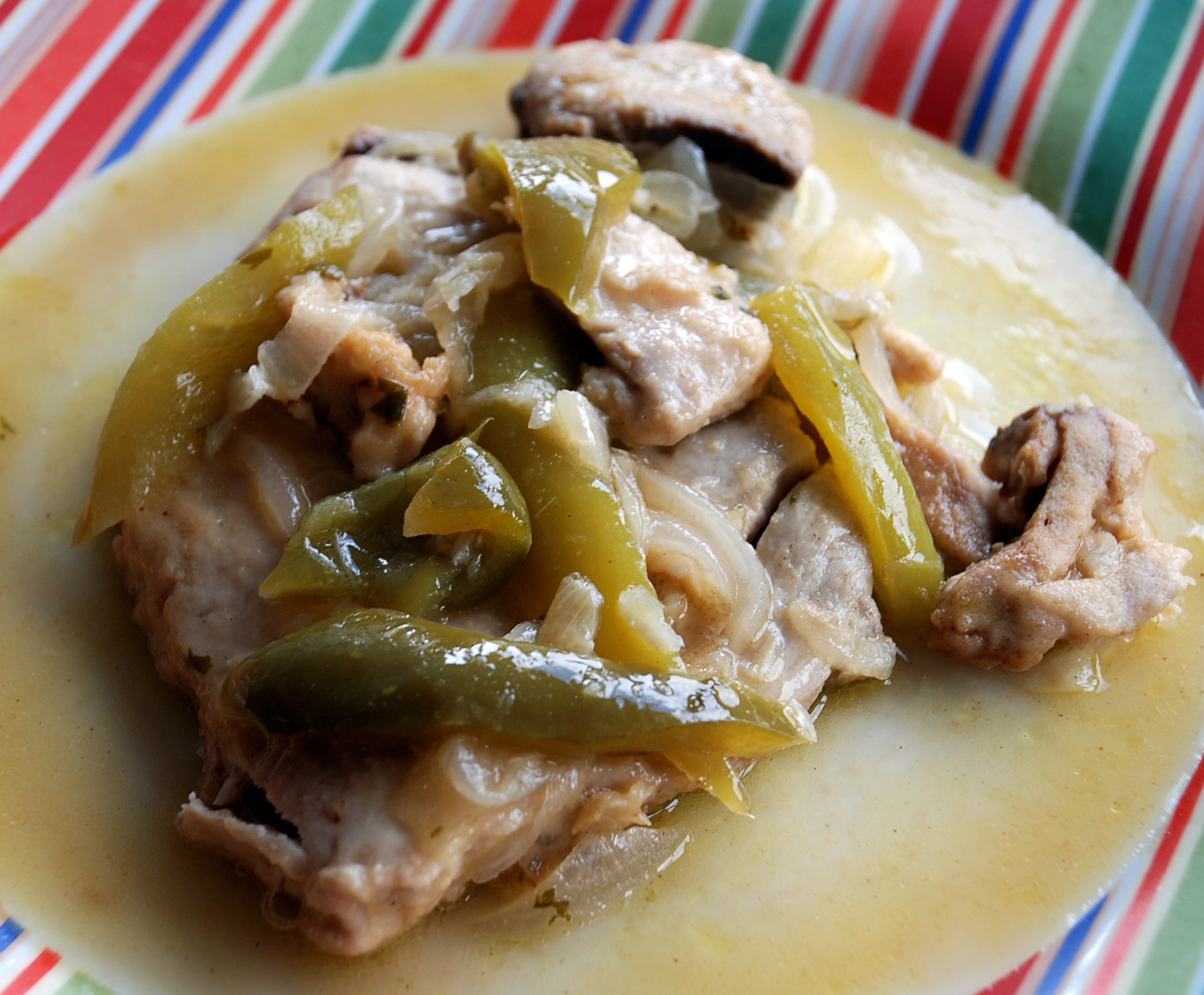
Bonito del Norte con piperrada, a Basque dish using albacore

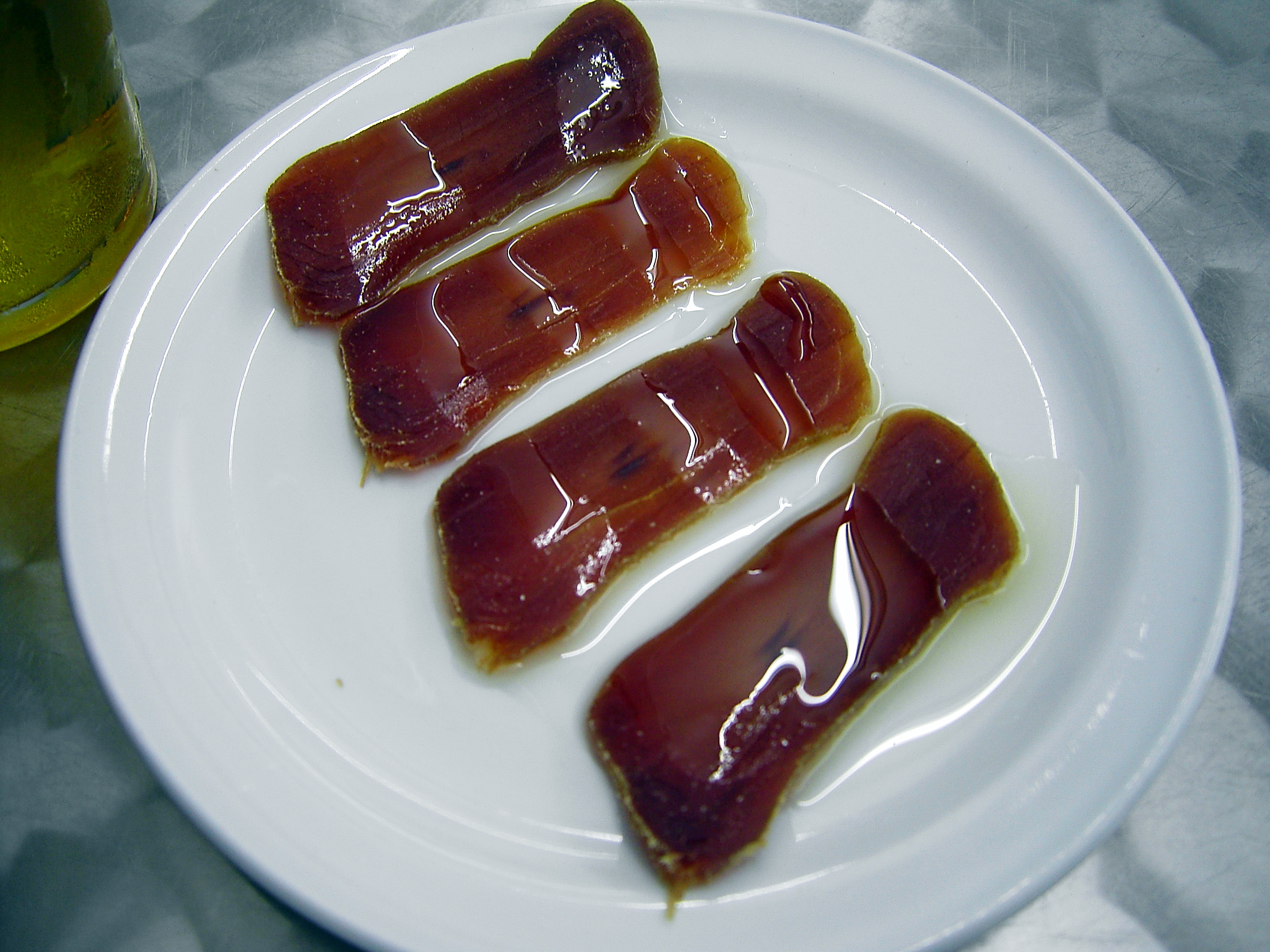
Mojama

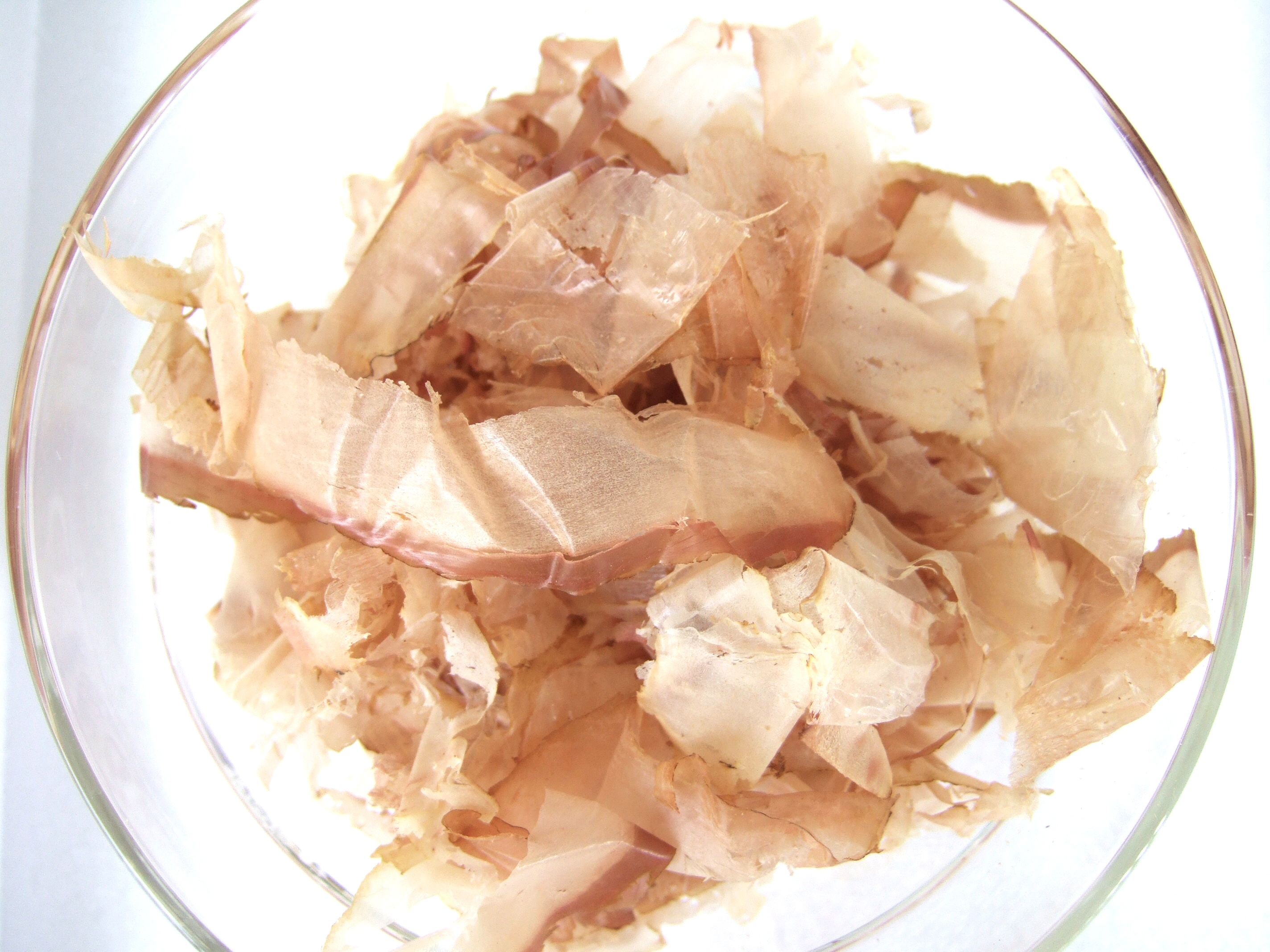
Katsuobushi shavings

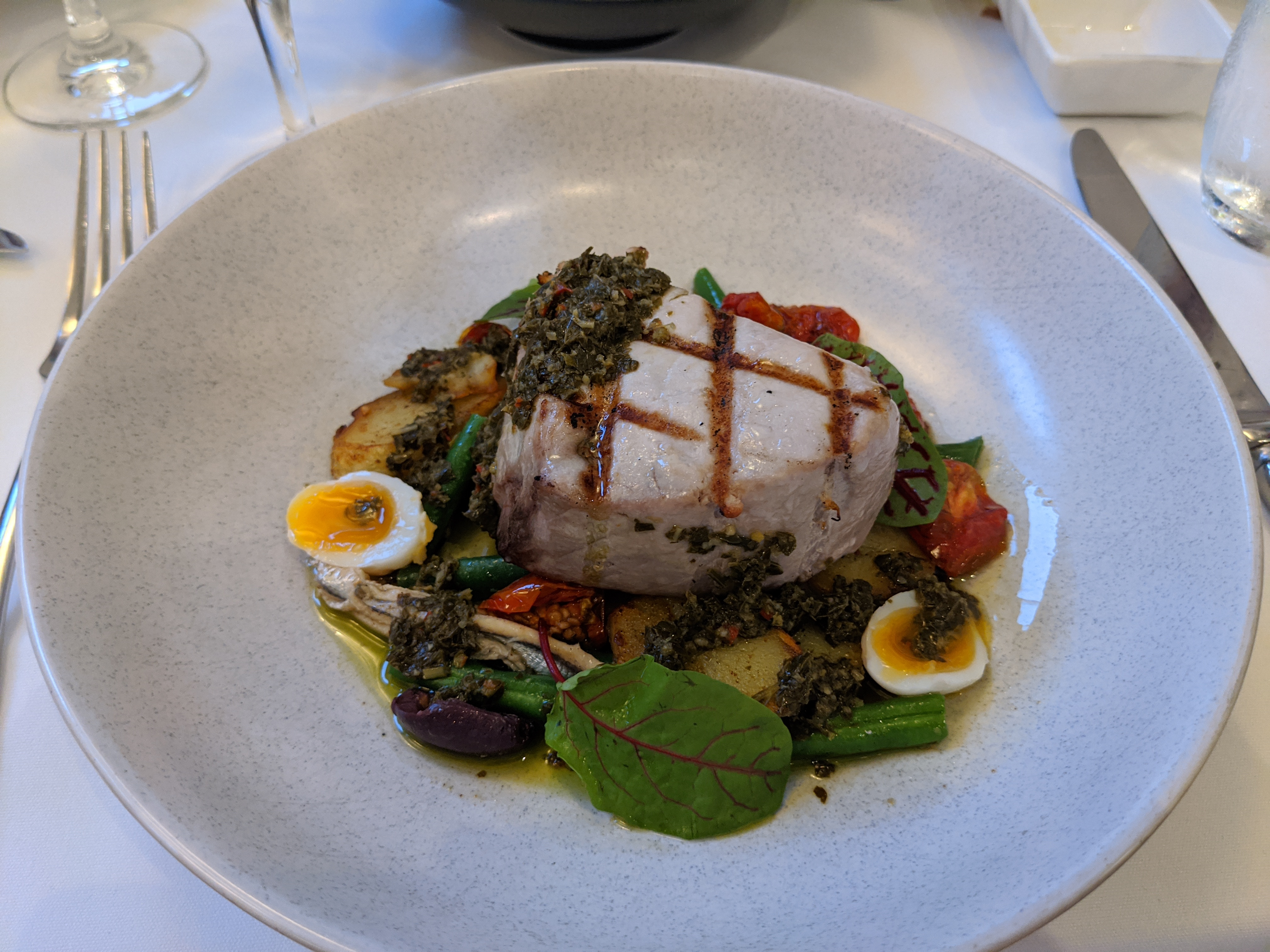
Grilled tuna steak

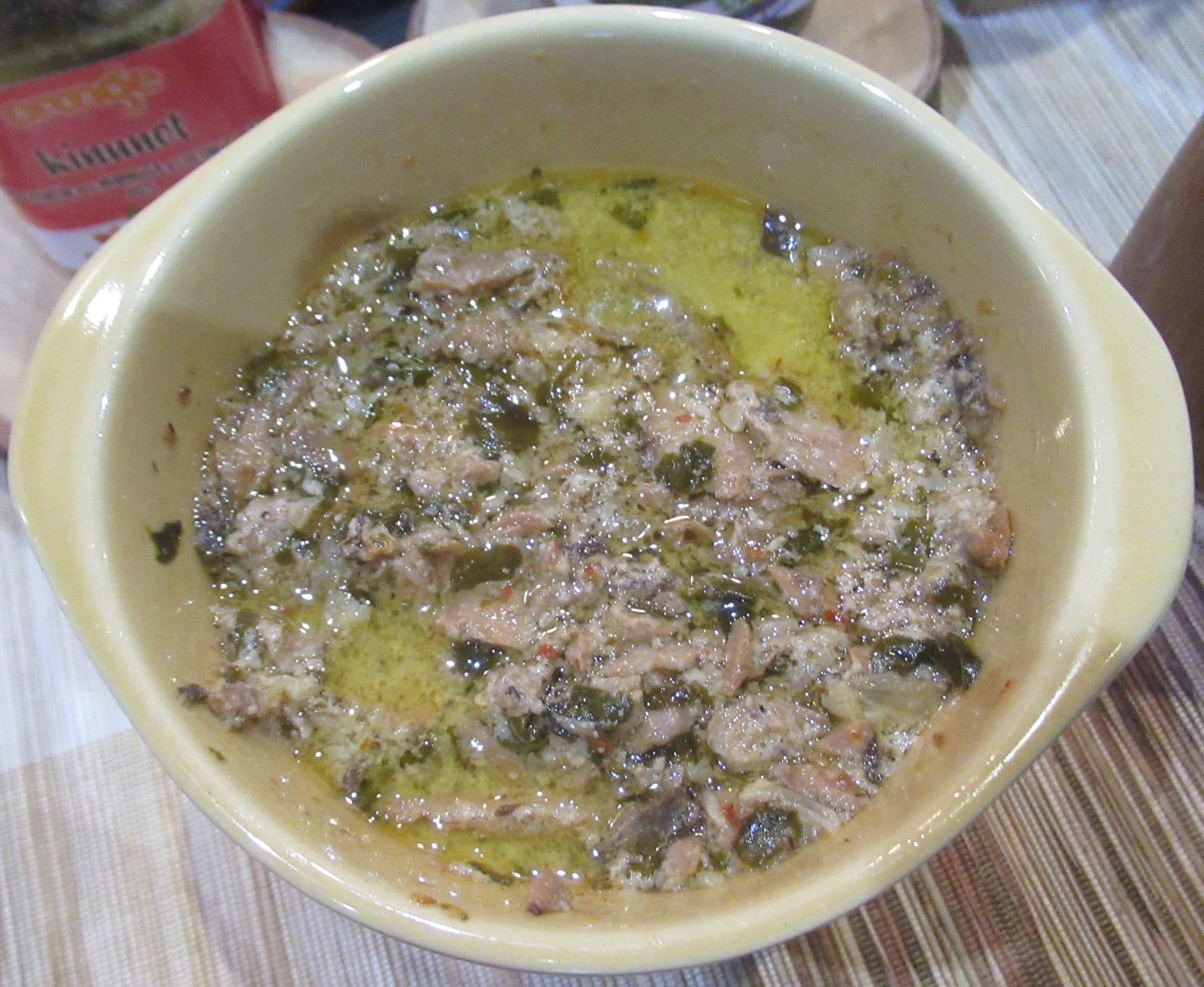
"Kinunot" na Isdang Tuna

== See also ==
- List of fish dishes
- Seafood dishes
