= Tekkadon =

Japanese rice dish topped with tuna sashimi

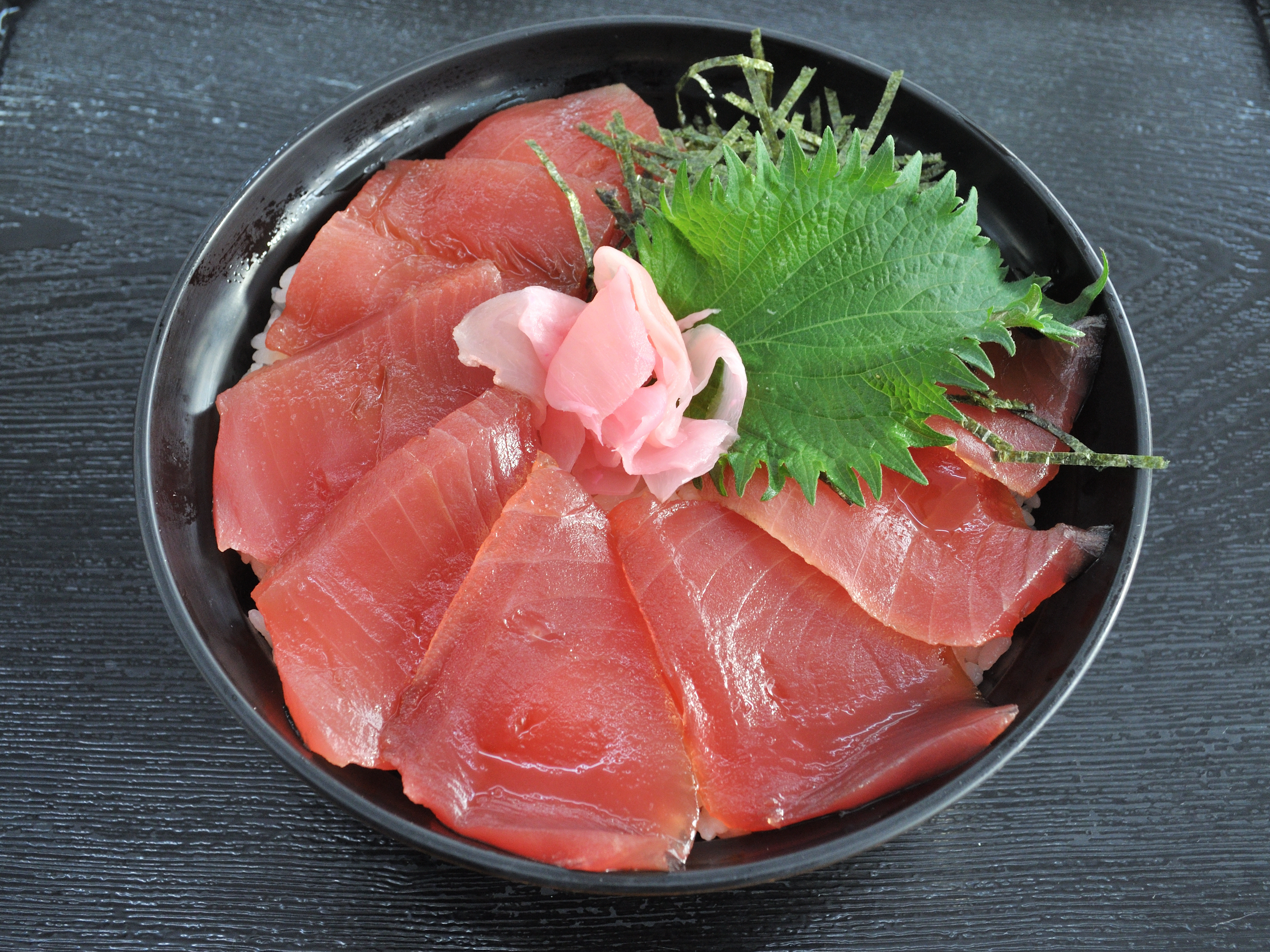
- Tekkadon
- Type: Donburi
- Place of origin: Japan
- Main ingredients: Tuna sashimi, rice

Tekkadon (鉄火丼), a type of donburi, is a Japanese rice dish topped with thin-sliced raw tuna sashimi. Spicy tekkadon is made with a mix of spicy ingredients, a spicy orange sauce, or both, usually incorporating spring onions.

== Name ==
The term tekka in the name derives from the gambling rooms (tekkaba) where the dish was commonly served from the end of the Edo period to the start of the Meiji period of Japan's history.

It is also called maguro-don, meaning "tuna bowl".

== Variations ==
A similar dish made with salmon sashimi is called sakedon.

== Gallery ==
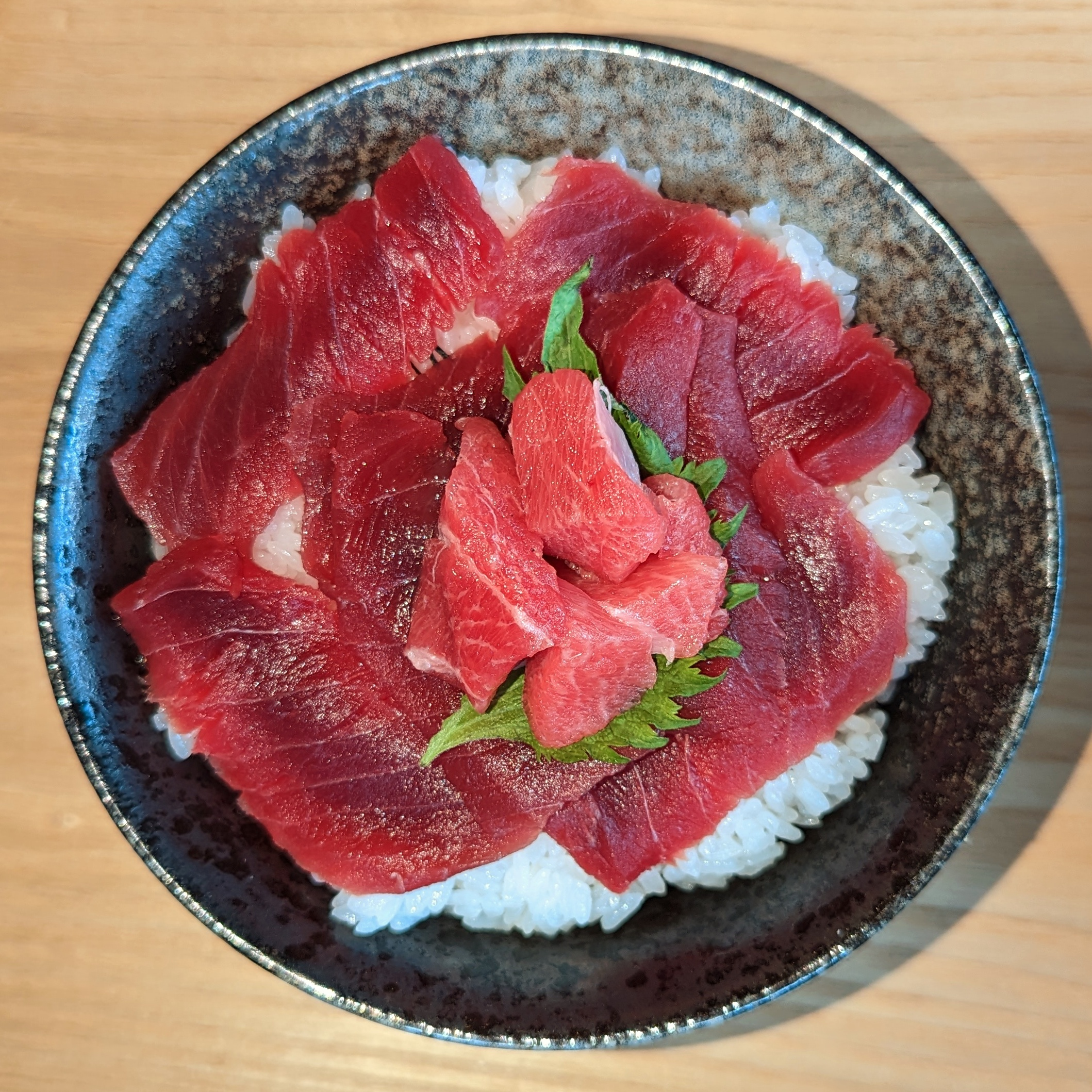

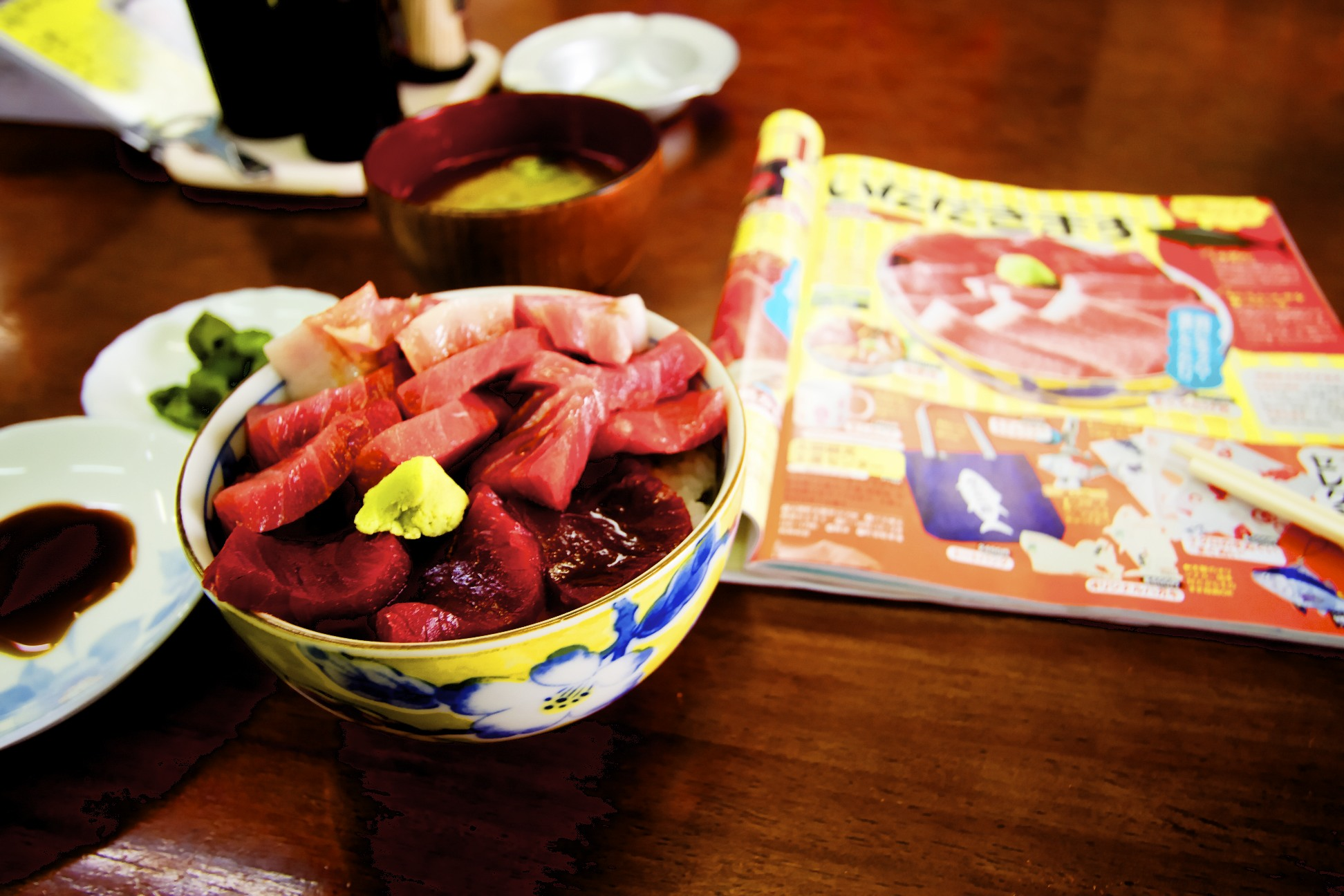

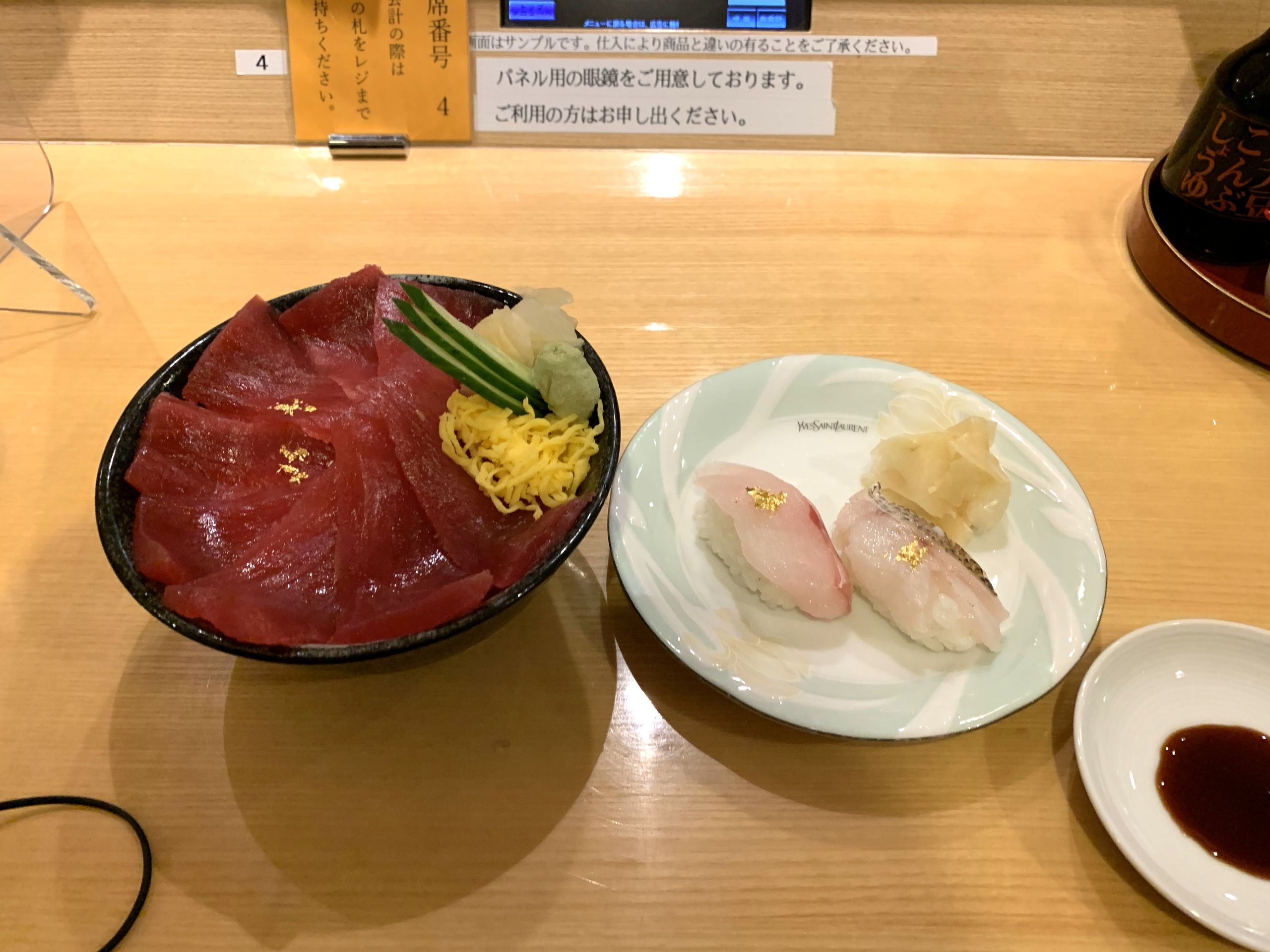

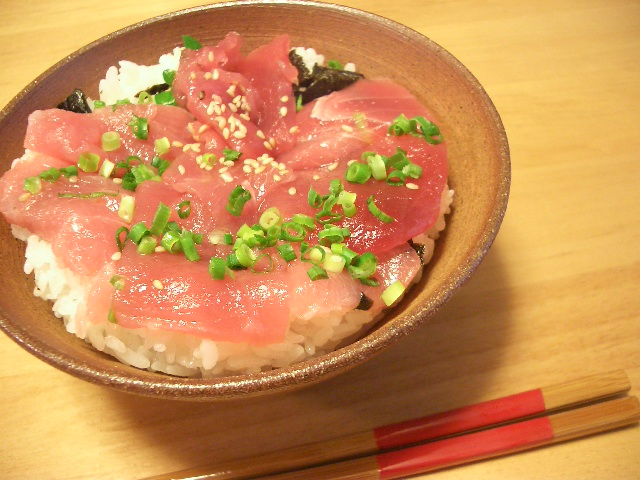

== See also ==
- Donburi
- Katsudon
- List of fish dishes
- List of tuna dishes
- Sushi
