= Boiled dressing =

Type of salad dressing

Boiled dressing is a type of creamy salad dressing of English and German origin that was especially popular in the 19th century and early 20th century as an alternative to mayonnaise, which is of French origin. Boiled dressing is easier for less skilled cooks to make from scratch, and liquid food oils needed to make mayonnaise were not readily available in Northern Europe and the United States in the 19th century. Mayonnaise was not available for retail purchase until 1912.

== Preparation ==
There are many variations of boiled dressing, and common ingredients include vinegar, sugar or honey, milk or cream, eggs or egg yolks, salt, mustard, cayenne and flour. Sometimes, the dressing is actually boiled but more often, it is gently cooked over boiling water in a double boiler. It was used in salads like cole slaw, chicken salad, potato salad and egg salad.

== Types ==
Salad cream, a product popular in the United Kingdom, is a type of boiled dressing developed by Heinz in 1914. Miracle Whip is a variant of boiled dressing popular in the United States since 1933, marketed by Kraft Foods, Inc. as a product that "combines the best qualities of fine mayonnaise and good old-fashioned boiled dressing by a secret recipe".

== History ==
A 1915 presentation of an elaborate Christmas dinner published in the New York Times was created by a home economist with the U.S. Department of Agriculture. The article included a recipe for a boiled dressing recommended for use in chicken salad or fruit salad.

Culinary writer M.F.K. Fisher preferred mayonnaise to boiled dressing, because she associated boiled dressing with her grandmother's old fashioned insistence on using it on lettuce. Another food writer, James Beard, loved cole slaw made with boiled dressing, because of pleasant childhood memories of the dish made by his family's beloved Chinese cook, Jue-Let, who was a major culinary influence on Beard.
