= Miracle Whip =

Salad dressing and mayonnaise substitute

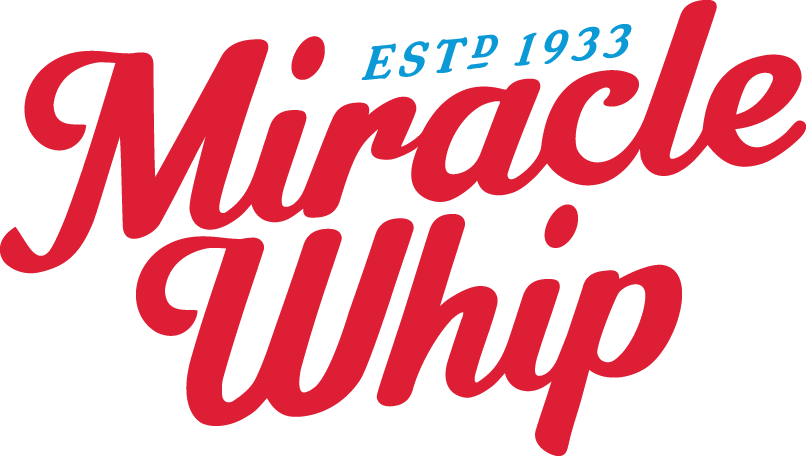

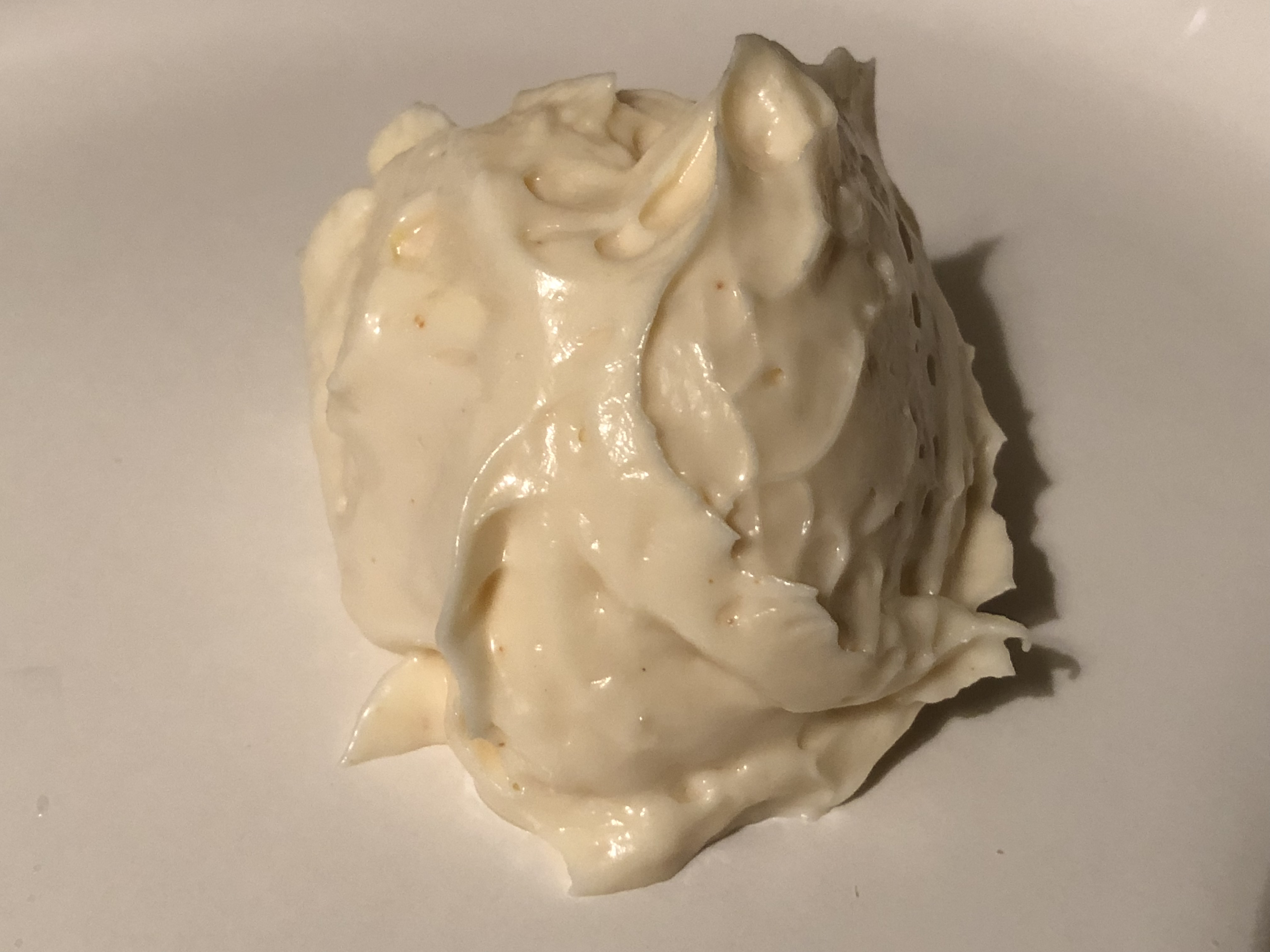
- Product type: Condiment
- Current owner: Kraft Heinz
- Introduced: 1933; 93 years ago
- Previous owners: Kraft Foods, Inc.

Miracle Whip is a condiment manufactured by Kraft Heinz and sold throughout the United States and Canada. It is also sold by Mondelēz International (formerly also Kraft Foods) as "Miracel Whip" throughout Germany. It was developed as a less expensive alternative to mayonnaise in 1933.

== History ==
Launched in 1933 at the World’s Fair in Chicago, Miracle Whip was promoted as a cheaper alternative to mayonnaise during the Great Depression. Miracle Whip soon became a success as a condiment for fruits, vegetables, and salads. Its success was bolstered by Kraft's advertising campaign, which included sponsorship of a series of two-hour radio programs. At the end of its introductory period, Miracle Whip was outselling all mayonnaise brands.

According to Kraft's archivist, Becky Haglund Tousey, Kraft developed the product in-house, using a patented "emulsifying machine", invented by Charles Chapman, to create a product that blended mayonnaise and less expensive boiled dressing or salad dressing spread. The machine, dubbed "Miracle Whip" by Chapman, ensured that the ingredients, including more than 20 spices, were thoroughly blended.

Another story claims that Miracle Whip was invented in Salem, Illinois, at Max Crosset's Cafe, where it was called "Max Crossett's X-tra Fine Salad Dressing", and that Crosset sold it to Kraft Foods in 1931 for $300 (equivalent to $6,400 in 2025). While stating that Kraft did buy many salad dressings, Tousey disputes the claim that X-tra Fine was Miracle Whip.

Since 1972, Miracle Whip has been sold as Miracel Whip in Germany. It was formerly produced by Kraft Foods, and is now made by Mondelēz International, in Bad Fallingbostel.

== Ingredients and nutrition ==
Miracle Whip's current ingredients are water, soybean oil, high-fructose corn syrup, vinegar, modified corn starch, eggs, salt, natural flavor, mustard flour, potassium sorbate, spice, and dried garlic. Kraft mayonnaise currently has 90 calories per tablespoon; the same portion of Miracle Whip is 35 calories.The added corn syrup makes Miracle Whip sweeter. The product’s original (1930s) ingredients were “eggs, salad oil, vinegar, sugar, salt, cereal and spices.”

== Advertising ==
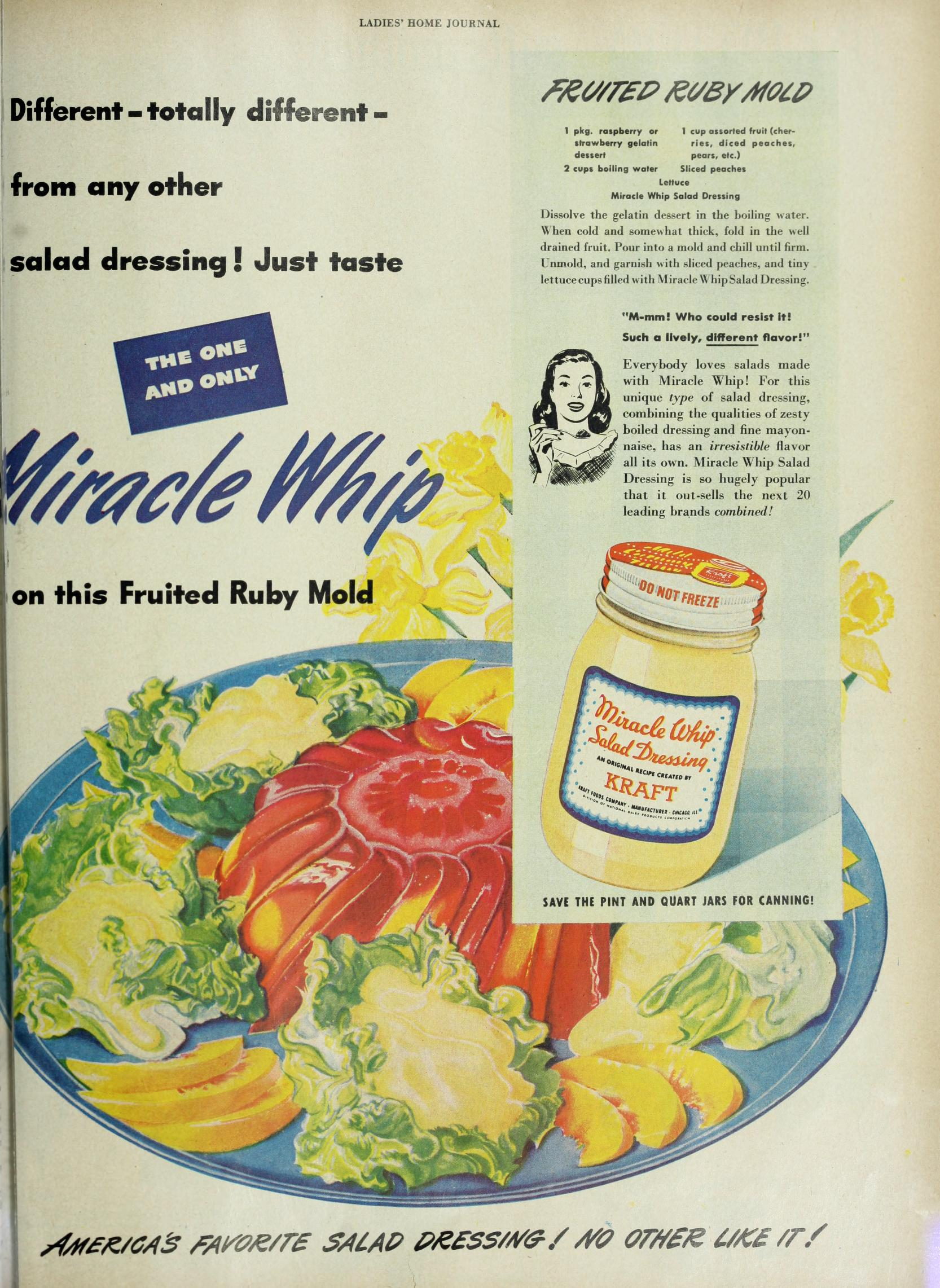
1948 advertisement

Six Flags announced a new partnership with the Miracle Whip brand in 2009.

In the late 2000s and early 2010s, Miracle Whip attempted to appeal to younger audiences, with Miracle Whip advertising featuring prominently in the Electronic Arts video game Skate 3, including a dedicated trick, contest, and an achievement called Don't Be So Mayo. Kraft paid Lady Gaga to include Miracle Whip in the music video for her song "Telephone". Television advertisements described Miracle Whip as an alternative to "real boring" mayonnaise. Criticism by Stephen Colbert led to Miracle Whip buying ad time on his show, The Colbert Report, and attacking Colbert for being a "mayo lover". This also included publishing an open letter stating the attack was "raising hell, man". Eventually, this advertising was dropped.

In 2018, the town of Mayo, Florida, temporarily changed its name to Miracle Whip as a promotional stunt.

== See also ==
- Salad cream, a British creamy yellow condiment
