= Salad cream =

Dressing similar to mayonnaise

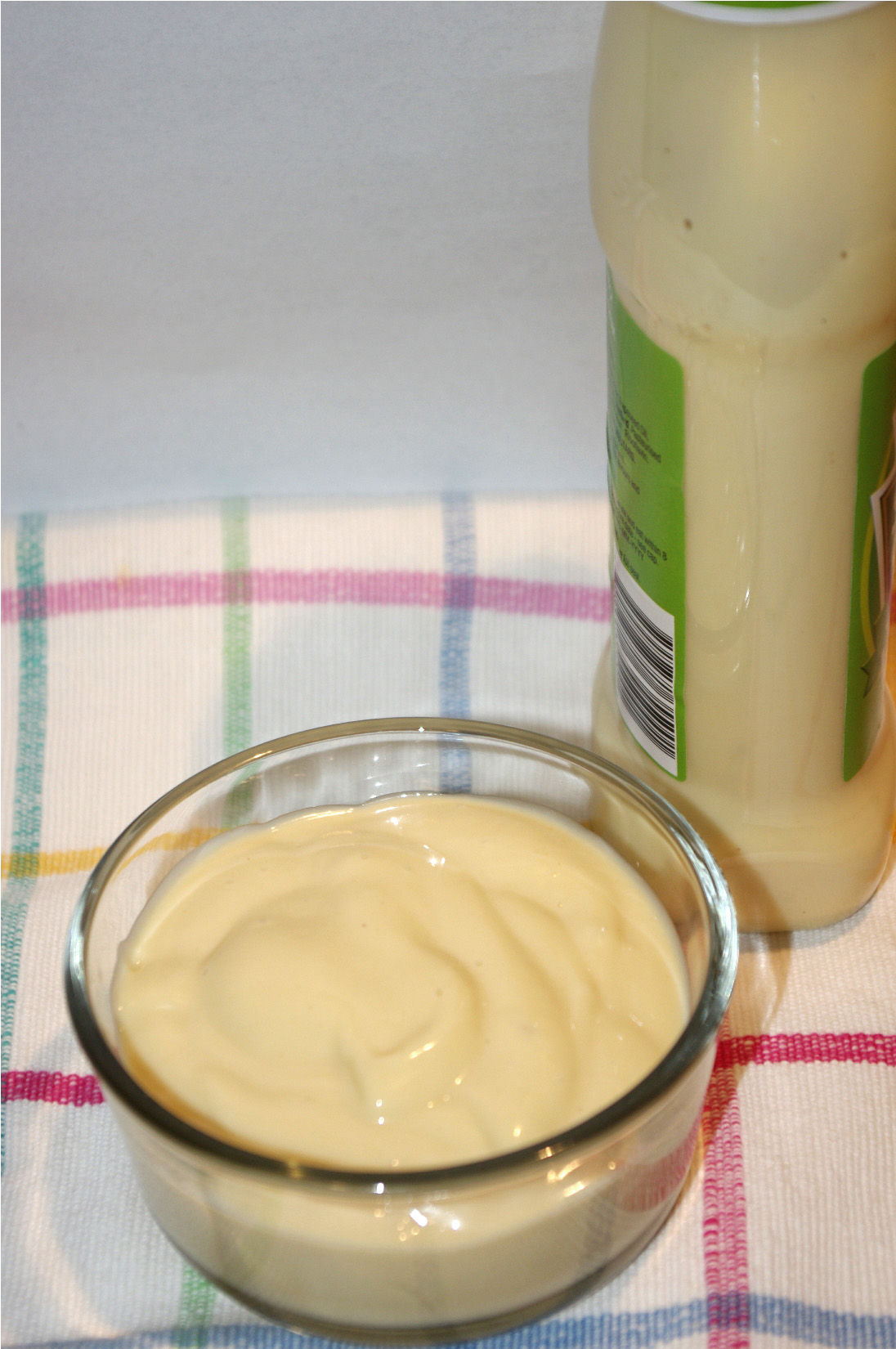
- Heinz Salad Cream
- Type: Salad dressing, also used as a sauce
- Place of origin: United Kingdom
- Created by: Heinz
- Main ingredients: Oil, water, egg yolks, spirit vinegar

Salad cream is a creamy condiment based on an emulsion of about 25–50 percent oil in water, emulsified by egg yolk and made slightly acidic by spirit vinegar. It is similar in composition to mayonnaise, but uses vinegar and water as its main constituent rather than oil. Both salad cream and mayonnaise usually include other ingredients such as sugar, mustard, salt, thickener, spices, flavouring and colouring, if bought in store, not made after the classic French way. The first ready-made commercial product was introduced in the United Kingdom in 1914, where it is used as a salad dressing and a sandwich spread.

Historically, salad cream, often mentioned in Victorian sources, consisted of "hard-boiled eggs puréed with cream, mustard, salt and vinegar".

== Brands ==
In the UK, it has been produced by companies such as H. J. Heinz Company and Crosse & Blackwell. Heinz Salad Cream was the first Heinz brand developed exclusively for the UK market. When first created in the Harlesden kitchens of Heinz in 1914, it was prepared by hand. The jars were packed in straw-lined barrels with 12 dozen in each. The quota was 180 dozen jars a day, with a halfpenny a dozen bonus if the workforce could beat the target.

In the 1990s, Heinz considered discontinuing its salad cream. The BBC described the public response as an "outcry". Heinz relaunched salad cream a few months later with a £10m advertising campaign, redesigned packs and increased price points.

In 2017, salad cream was the fifth best-selling table sauce in the UK according to data from Nielsen, with sales of £28.8m.

== See also ==
- List of sauces
- Miracle Whip, a similar North American condiment
