= Single Shot (restaurant) =

Restaurant in Seattle, Washington, U.S.

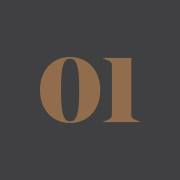

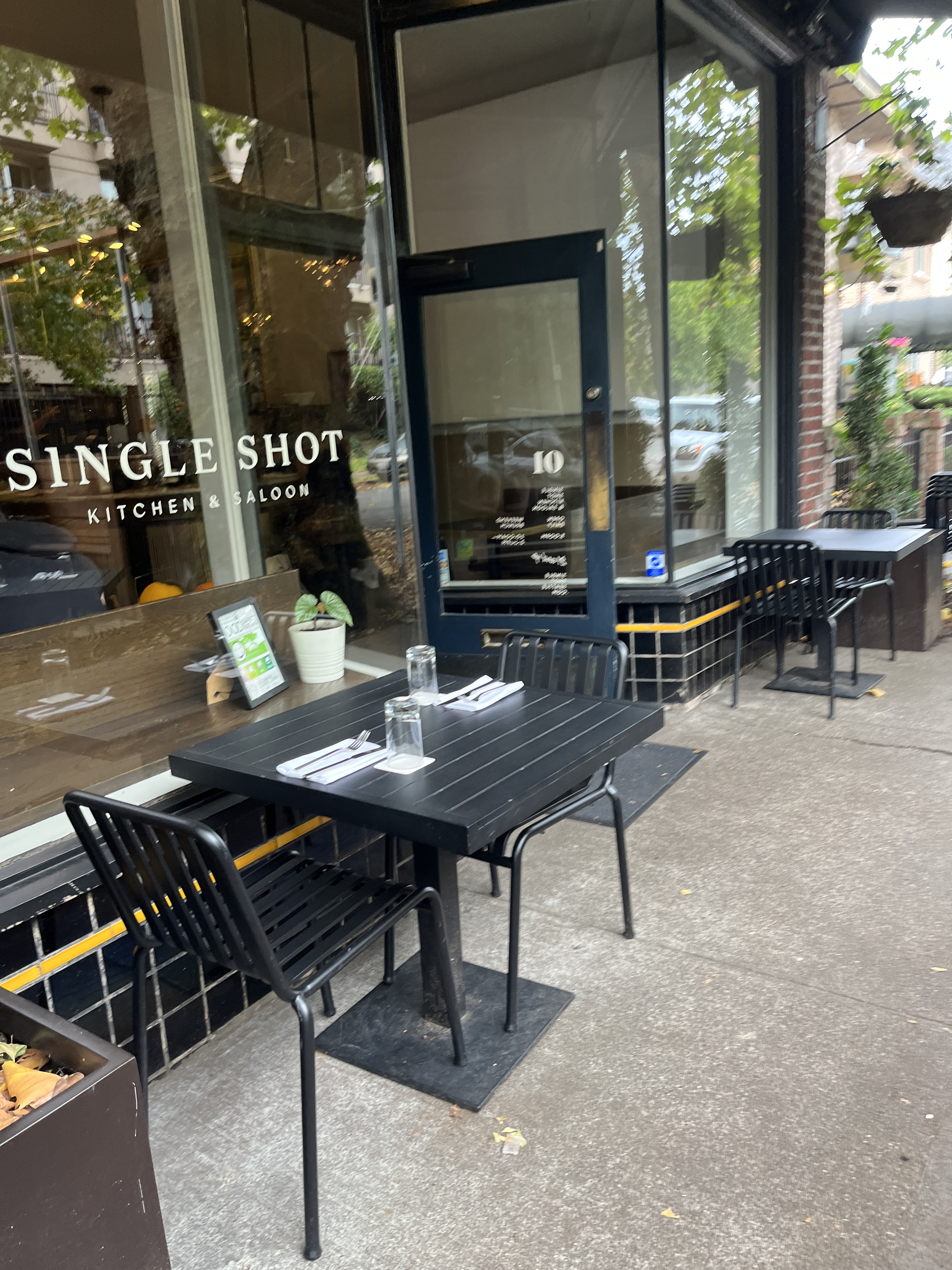
- Exterior of Single Shot, 2023
- Interactive map of Single Shot

Restaurant information
- Location: 611 Summit Avenue E, Seattle, King, Washington, 98102, United States
- Coordinates: 47.6247°N 122.3256°W
- Seating capacity: ~40
- Website: singleshotseattle.com

Single Shot Kitchen and Saloon, or simply Single Shot, is a restaurant on Seattle's Capitol Hill, in the U.S. state of Washington. The restaurant opened in 2014, and has garnered a generally positive reception for its menu of American, New American, and Pacific Northwest cuisine.

== Description ==
Single Shot is a 1,200-square-foot restaurant and bar on Summit Avenue, on Seattle's Capitol Hill. In the guide book Moon Seattle, Allison Williams described the interior as a "glistening white space" with black furniture and "posh" globe lights. She also described an antique 12-foot-long replica of a rifle above the bar, which she called "a piece of whimsy in an otherwise sophisticated spot". The restaurant's name is reportedly a reference to this gun.

Angela Garbes of The Stranger said Single Shot "feels as upscale as it does casual" and "walks a fine line between sterile and warm". She said the "austere white-and-gray color scheme, slate tabletops, polished white subway tiles, and heavy marble bar top are balanced by vintage, Sputnik-style light fixtures that cast a golden light." She also described a large wooden gun (deemed a shotgun) above mirrored shelves holding liquor.

Single Shot has billed itself as a "kitchen and saloon", and has a vegetable-heavy menu. The seating capacity is approximately 40 people. Seattle Magazine has described the setting as "cozy 1920s meets modern minimalist chic". Candles are displayed at tables and throughout the restaurant, which KING-TV has described as "a cozy space with charming, yet elegant decor". The restaurant also has a wood-fired oven.

=== Menu ===
Single Shot's menu has been described as American, New American, and Pacific Northwest cuisine. Allecia Vermillion of Seattle Metropolitan wrote, "True to Seattle form, the menu is highly shareable and ranges from accessible ... to more daring takes on pub food, like a ragout of lobster mushrooms and veal sweetbreads."

In addition to a full cocktail and wine list, the menu has included salmon, risotto, a snap pea salad, a Tuscan kale flatbread, roasted cauliflower, and Romanesco with romesco sauce, toasted hazelnuts, and pickled kohlrabi. The black rice porridge has uni, mussels, and pork belly with sticky rice. Among pizzas is a duck confit variety. The Pizza Margherita has prosciutto, mozzarella, San Marzano tomatoes, basil, and crushed red pepper. The tarte flambeé has bacon and Comté cheese.

Single Shot has served chicken-liver mousse with berbere, cinnamon, cumin, Dijon mustard, and a Madeira-shallot reduction, as well as lamb chops, a strip steak, and a hanger steak with roasted baby turnips, sautéed wild mushrooms (caramelized chanterelles and black trumpets), ham mostarda, and Tête de Moine cheese. The menu has also included a baked pasta with curried goat and leeks reminiscent of macaroni and cheese, a pork chops over spaghetti squash, and a coleslaw with chives, citrus, and fennel. The spreadable pub cheese comes with brioche and an apple cider reduction.

The dessert menu has included a honey pot de crème. Cappuccinos and other espresso drinks are available for dinner and weekend brunch. Seattle Magazine has called the brunch menu a "sophisticated twist on familiar late morning fare"; options have included avocado toast, a bacon hash, and egg dishes. For Valentine's Day, Single Shot has hosted a four-course prix fixe menu including burrata, foie gras, lobster, and pork loin. The restaurant has been called vegetarian-friendly.

== History ==
In June 2014, Eater Seattle reported on plans for Single Shot to open by late summer, in the space previously used as a gallery of photographer Spike Mafford, next to Top Pot Doughnuts.

The bar opened in October 2014, as a collaboration between chef James Sherrill, Guy Kugel as wine and service director, Adam Fream as bar director, and Rory McCormick. Anna Wallace has been a bartender; her celery soda, made by Seattle Seltzer Company, has been available on tap.

== Reception ==
Shortly after the restaurant opened, Nicole Sprinkle of Seattle Weekly called Single Shot the "latest place to be seen" on Capitol Hill. She said the gastropub had "small, rather pricey" plates that were "generously portioned", and called the chicken-liver mousse "a hit". Julia Wayne included Single Shot in Eater Seattle's 2015 overview of recommended eateries for dining alone on Valentine's Day. She wrote, "what makes it especially nice for singles is its out of the way location in the middle of a neighborhood". The website also included Single Shot in a 2015 list of six Seattle bars with "very good" food and 2025 overview of the best restaurants on Capitol Hill.

The Stranger's Angela Garbes said the restaurant "isn't cheap, but it's reasonable", offering "good" food and "equally good" cocktails. In 2015, she wrote, "while [Single Shot is] shiny and very pretty, it seems to slide right into the neighborhood rather than disrupt it. It feels built to last, poised to create a loyal base of customers from nearby and, perhaps, afar (if they can find parking)." Her review was not entirely positive, she found some of the ingredients in specific dishes distratcting and wrote, "Many of the dishes at Single Shot could use a few less things on the plate." Seattle Magazine included the business in a 2015 list of the ten best new restaurants in the metropolitan area.

Providence Cicero of The Seattle Times wrote a positive review of Single Shot in 2015. She complimented the oven-roasted meats, the "sensational" black rice porridge, and the pork belly, but deemed the buckwheat cake "dull" and "heavy". She called the food "sophisticated yet comfortable" and said the restaurant is "in a pocket of Capitol Hill that's a bit off the beaten path, yet I expect many will draw a bead on Single Shot more than once". Seattle Metropolitan has said, "What [the restaurant] lacks in consistency it makes up for in excellence if the place is on its game, making Single Shot a crapshoot—but one that the ambience makes worthwhile." In the magazine's 2021 overview of Capitol Hill's best restaurants, Allecia Vermillion said Single Shot "conjures definite visions of bygone Manhattan" and "continues Seattle's grand tradition of cocktail bars that also happen to serve destination-worthy food".

In The Infatuation's similar overview of Capitol Hill's best restaurants in 2023, Aimee Rizzo and Kayla Sager-Riley said, "Single Shot is one of our favorite Capitol Hill date night spots—not just because it's far removed from the noise and hot dog cart smells of Pike/Pine, but also because the dining room is attractive, there's a big marble bar, and everything on the menu, from the cold potato and crab salad to the seared steak to the margherita flatbread with prosciutto, is excellent." The duo recommended, "Pull up a seat at the bar, order a bottle of sparkling wine, and know there's no possible way to screw this up." Rizzo and Sager-Riley included the Pizza Margherita in a list of Seattle's best pizza, and Rizzo also included Single Shot in a 2023 overview of the city's "most romantic" restaurants for date night.

== See also ==
- List of New American restaurants
- List of Pacific Northwest restaurants
