= Fenouil =

Defunct French restaurant in Portland, Oregon, U.S.

- Interactive map of Fenouil

Restaurant information
- Established: 2005
- Closed: 2011
- Food type: French; Pacific Northwest
- Location: 900 Northwest 11th Avenue, Portland, Oregon, 97209, United States
- Coordinates: 45°31′46″N 122°40′56″W

Fenouil was a French and Pacific Northwest restaurant in Portland, Oregon. The business operated from 2005 to 2011.

== Description ==
Grant Butler of The Oregonian described Fenouil as an "enormous", two-story French restaurant next to Jamison Square in northwest Portland's Pearl District. Willamette Week said the restaurant had "coveted see-and-be-seen" patio seating and three "cozy" fireplaces. Eater Portland's Erin DeJesus described the restaurant as a "French-meets-contemporary-Northwest spot". Fenouil has also been described as an "upscale dining concept".

The menu included escargots, frog legs, and wild boar. According to The New York Times, the "sleek" Fenouil served "brasserie classics" like roast duck with Armagnac prunes and steak frites, pumpkin and mushroom gnocchi, and lobster beignets. The 220-seat restaurant served Pacific Northwest cuisine, as of 2010.

Fodor's said, "The large stone fireplace, expansive bar, bistro menu, and widely revered spring-onion soup are a few of the reasons patrons keep coming back to this warm and elegant two-story restaurant. Notable entrée choices vary by season, but two reliable crowd pleasers are the grilled Kobe sirloin and the wood-fired duck breast with Armagnac-soaked prunes. There's live music on Friday nights. At the end of each month the chef creates an all-inclusive "regional dinner" that explores foods from a unique culinary region."

== History ==
Fenouil operated from 2005 to 2011. The restaurant was owned by Chris and Tyanne Dussin (Dussin Group). Pascal Chureau was the opening chef. He left in 2010. Jake Martin became executive chef effective February 15. Kristen D. Murray, described by Michael Russell of The Oregonian as one of city's "top" pastry chefs, worked at the restaurant. Ken Forkish developed a raisin-pecan bread to accompany the restaurant's cheese plate.

Molly Hottle of The Oregonian attributed the restaurant's closure to the economy.

== Reception ==
In 2006, writers for Willamette Week appreciated the menu but said the restaurant "feels more like a shiny-new Bridgeport Village suburban eatery than an authentic French restaurant". Moon Oregon (2007) said Fenouil was "simultaneously flamboyant and studied", and "visually one of the most impressive" restaurants in the city. In 2010, the newspaper's Deeda Schroeder said "the kitchen has no problem consistently turning out beautiful food. Whether it's a Saturday dinner or a late workday lunch, there's no question the cooks have what it takes to create tiny, work-of-art eats".

The restaurant was rated three and a half out of four stars in the eighth edition of Best Places: Portland (2010), and three out of three stars in the seventeenth edition of Best Places Northwest (2010). Fodor's Oregon (2011) says "Popular destinations like Bluehour, Fenouil, and Andina have cemented the reputation of Northwest Portland's Pearl District as a restaurant hot spot." Grant Butler included Fenouil in The Oregonian's 2016 list of "97 long-gone Portland restaurants we wish were still around". In 2016, Michael C. Zusman of Willamette Week said the "fancy, Francophonic Fenouil flopped". Allecia Vermillion of the Seattle Metropolitan called the restaurant "late" and "lovely" in 2018.

== See also ==
- List of French restaurants
- List of Pacific Northwest restaurants
