= Lil Woody's =

Restaurant chain based in Seattle, Washington, U.S.

Lil Woody's Burgers & Shakes
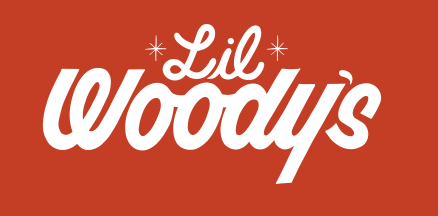

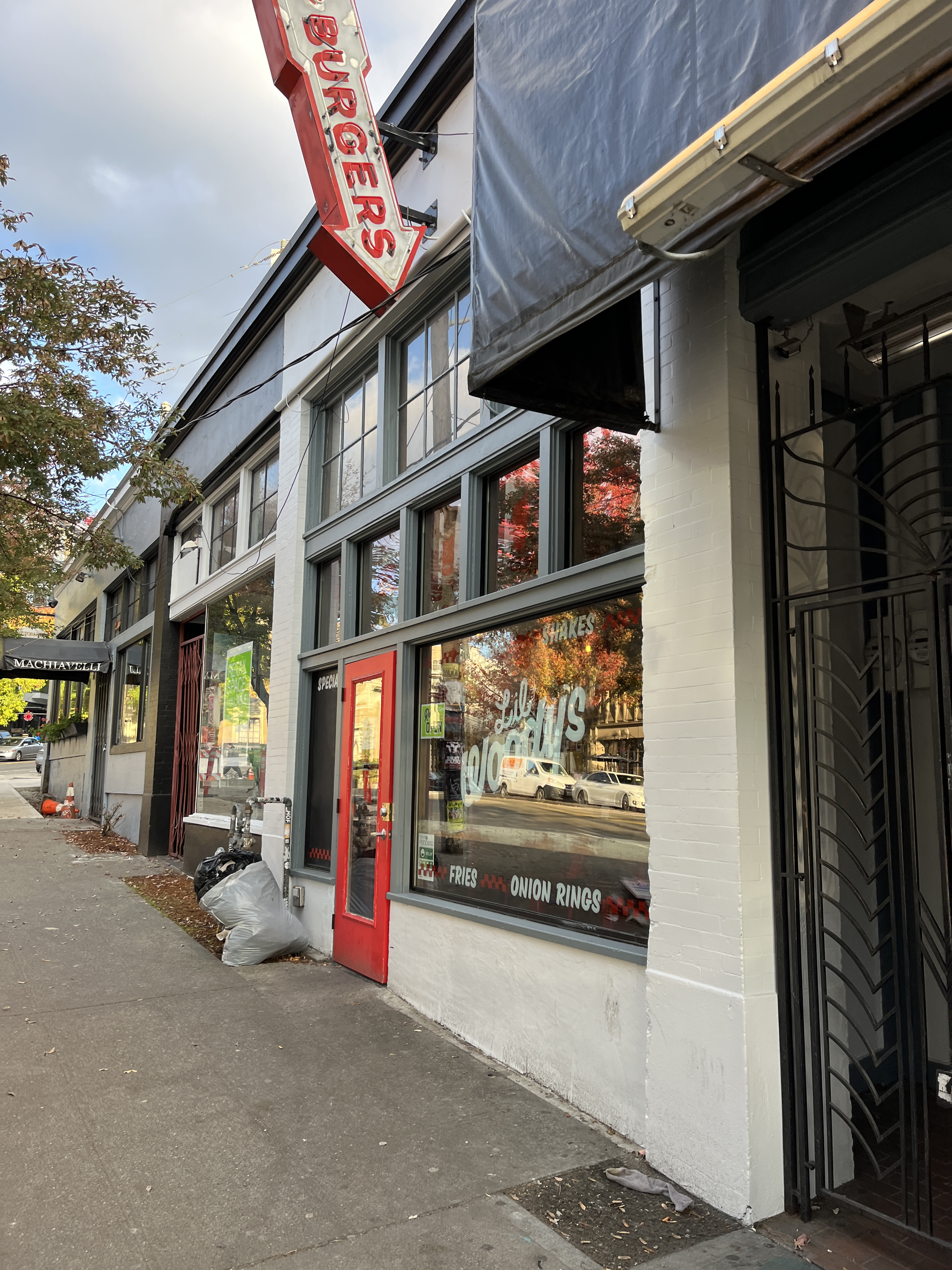
- Exterior of the original restaurant on Seattle's Capitol Hill, 2022
- Interactive map of Lil Woody's Burgers & Shakes

Restaurant information
- Established: 2011
- Owner: Marcus Lalario
- Location: 1211 Pine Street, Seattle, King, Washington, 98101, United States
- Coordinates: 47.6150°N 122.3282°W
- Website: lilwoodys.com

Lil Woody's Burgers & Shakes, or simply Lil Woody's, is a restaurant chain based in Seattle, Washington. Marcus Lalario is the owner of the business, which was established on Capitol Hill in 2011.

In the Seattle metropolitan area, Lil Woody's has operated outposts in Ballard, South Lake Union, Tangletown, and White Center. Lil Woody's is also a vendor at T-Mobile Park, Seattle–Tacoma International Airport, and Climate Pledge Arena. In 2023, the restaurant expanded to Shibuya, Tokyo.

== Description ==
Lil Woody's is a restaurant chain based in Seattle, Washington, with multiple locations in the metropolitan area as well as Tokyo. Among burgers on the menu are the Lil Woody, which has Tillamook cheddar cheese, onions, pickles, ketchup, and mayonnaise, and the Big Woody (add bacon). The Trotter has caramelized onions, apple, bacon, and horseradish sauce. Other burger toppings have included blue cheese, and pickled figs, or queso and roasted chiles. Lil Woody's has also served an Impossible burger, as well as chicken fingers, French fries, beer, cocktails, milkshakes, and wine.

== History ==
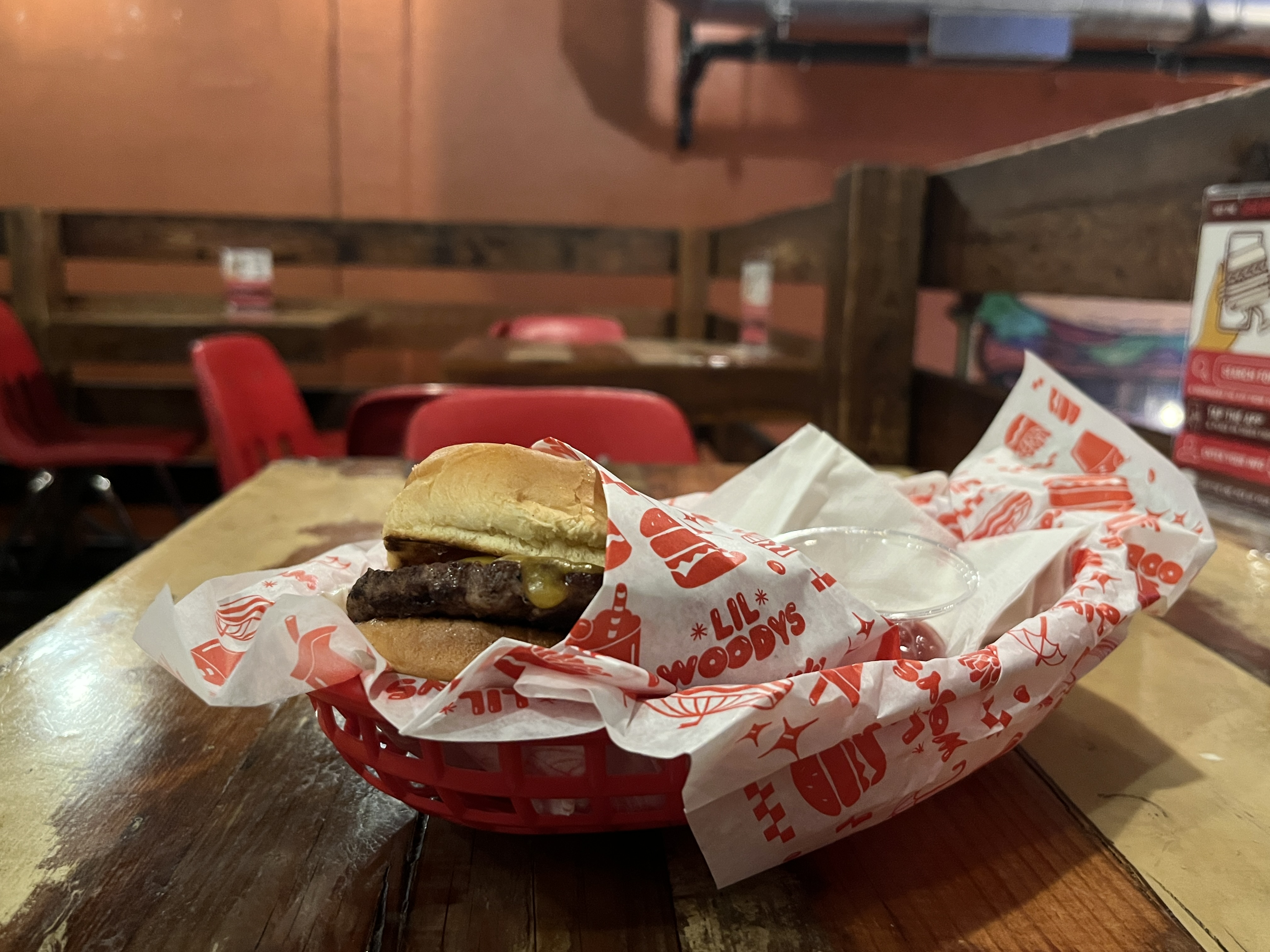
A Lil Woody burger inside the Capitol Hill restaurant, 2023

The original restaurant opened on Capitol Hill in 2011. The South Lake Union restaurant opened in November 2016. The White Center location opened in the beer hall called Beer Star in 2017. In 2019, Lil Woody's became a vendor at T-Mobile Park, and announced plans to operate at Seattle–Tacoma International Airport. The company was announced as a vendor for Climate Pledge Arena in 2021. The arena location features "just walk out" technology. Lil Woody's expanded the executive team to manage these expansions.

For the 2023 Major League Baseball All-Star Game, the T-Mobile Park location offered a garlic fry burger for a limited time. In 2023, the restaurant expanded to Japan, opening in the Dogenzaka-dori building in Shibuya, Tokyo. The expansion made Lil Woody's the first Seattle-based burger restaurant to operate in Japan. The store closed in September 2025.

Lil Woody's has an annual tradition of featuring burger specials in February, in collaboration with local chefs. Participants have included chefs from Archipelago, Cafe Campagne, Canlis, and Spice Waala. J. Kenji López-Alt participated in 2022, and chefs from Communion and Off Alley participated in 2023.

== Reception ==
In 2018, The Seattle Times said Lil Woody's was one of the city's top four burger establishments. Zuri Anderson of iHeart said Lil Woody's had the "most delicious" burger and fries in Washington. Reader's Digest said the restaurant had Washington's best burger in 2022 and 2023.

== See also ==
- List of hamburger restaurants
- List of restaurant chains in the United States
