= L'Orange (restaurant) =

Restaurant in Portland, Oregon, U.S.

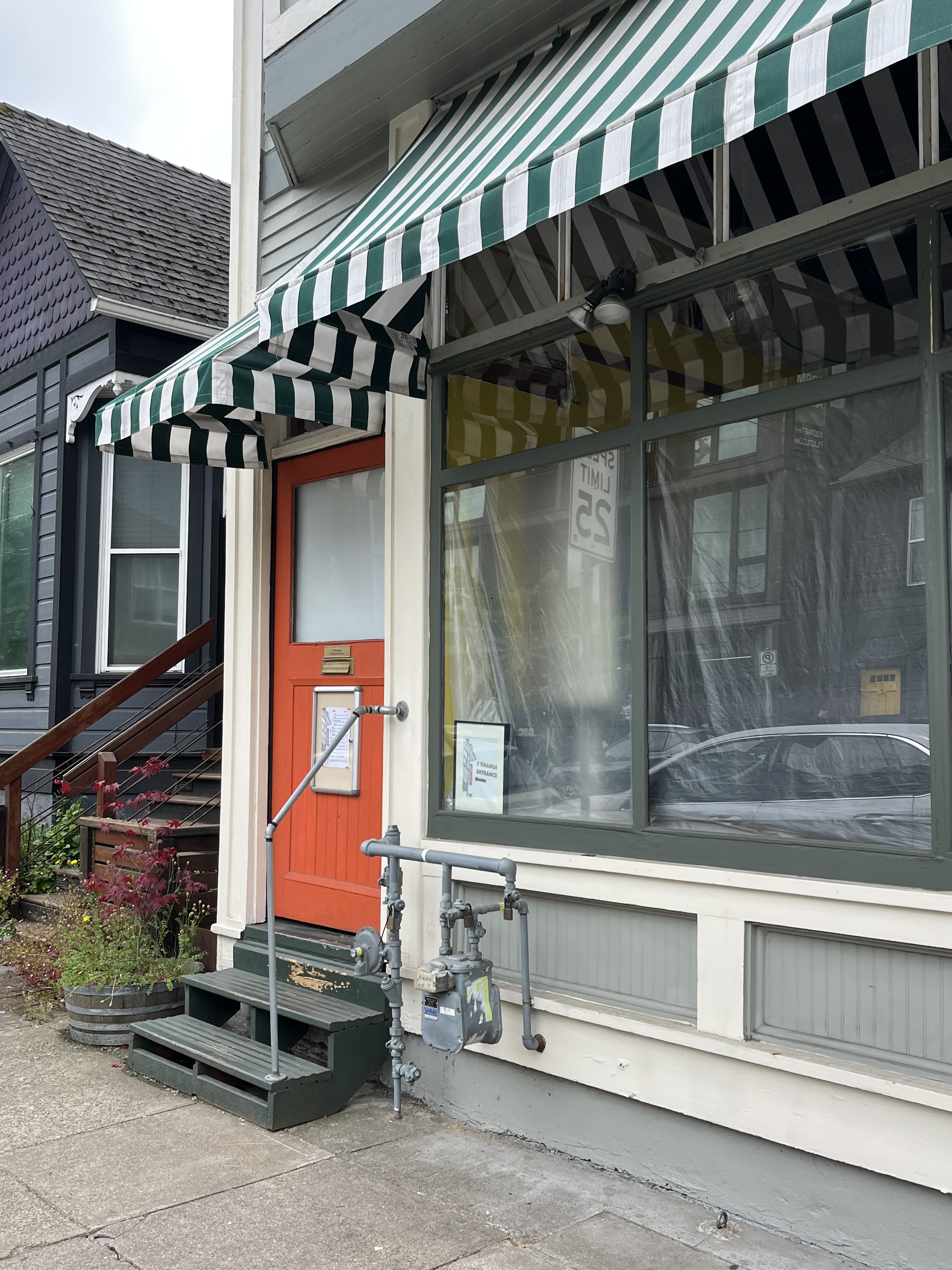
- The restaurant's exterior in 2025
- Interactive map of L'Orange

Restaurant information
- Established: June 2023
- Owners: Joel Stocks; Jeff Vejr
- Chef: Joel Stocks
- Food type: French; Mediterranean; Pacific Northwest
- Location: 2005 Southeast 11th Avenue, Portland, Multnomah, Oregon, 97214, United States
- Coordinates: 45.5085°N 122.6549°W
- Website: lorangepdx.com

L'Orange is a restaurant in Portland, Oregon, United States. Chef Joel Stocks and winemaker Jeff Vejr opened the restaurant in southeast Portland's Hosford-Abernethy neighborhood in June 2023. L'Orange has garnered a positive reception and ranked fourth in The Oregonian's list of Portland's best new restaurants of 2023.

== Description ==
The restaurant L'Orange is located at the intersection of 11th Avenue and Harrison Street in southeast Portland's Hosford-Abernethy neighborhood, serving French-, Mediterranean-, and Pacific Northwest-inspired cuisine. The business operates from a 1905 house that previously served as a telegram office, a butchery, and other restaurants. L'Orange has an orange-colored front door and bills itself as an "Old Portland" restaurant. The interior has "fantastical" wallpapers and white lace curtains, according to Neil Ferguson of Willamette Week.

The menu has included duck confit with black lentils, smoked sturgeon, wine-braised short ribs, gnocchi with squash and mushrooms in a pistachio-ginger sauce, and seasonal salads and vegetables. The restaurant has also served French onion soup, a "rose" made of cheese, and a cake with cardamom icing.

== History ==
Chef Joel Stocks and winemaker Jeff Vejr opened L'Orange in June 2023, in the space that previously housed Cellar Door Coffee Roasters and Willow. For New Year's Eve in 2023, L'Orange offered a six-course tasting menu. In January 2024, Stocks launched the restaurant's first regular tasting menu. The seven-course dinner became available for eight people at the bar, and the dining room and lounge continued regular service.

== Reception ==
Michael Russell ranked L'Orange fourth in The Oregonian's list of Portland's best new restaurants of 2023. He recommended the cheese "rose", the sturgeon, and the L'Orange cake. Russell later included the business in the newspaper's 2025 list of the 21 best restaurants in southeast Portland. He also ranked L'Orange number 28 in The Oregonian's 2025 list of Portland's 40 best restaurants.

Andrea Damewood included the French onion soup in the Portland Mercury's 2023 list of the "best bites" from Portland eateries in 2023. In 2024, Neil Ferguson of Willamette Week wrote:

Portland's post-pandemic landscape continues to be a tumultuous time for restaurants, with many suffering from inconsistent service or leaning heavily into concepts that lose the interest of diners after a short time. L'Orange is a welcome return to a simpler, slightly more affordable model thanks to its approachable elegance. Stocks, Vejr and their team have given us a spot that feels at home in its neighborhood—the kind of place you want to keep going back to. Maybe more restaurants should aspire to capture the spirit of 'Old Portland.'

== See also ==
- List of French restaurants
- List of Pacific Northwest restaurants
