= Produce Row Café =

Restaurant in Portland, Oregon, U.S.

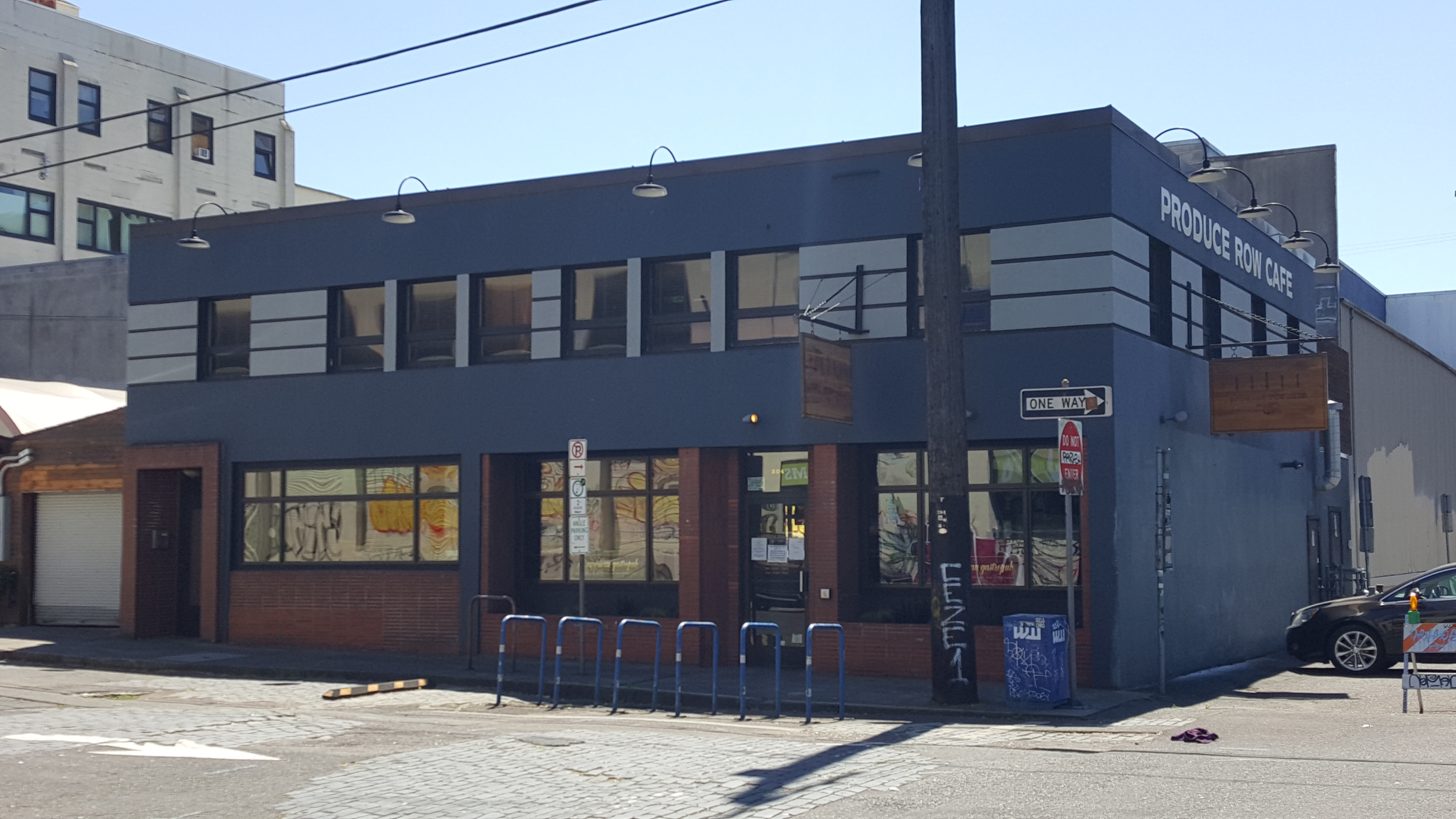
- The restaurant's exterior in 2020
- Interactive map of Produce Row Café

Restaurant information
- Established: 1974
- Food type: Pacific Northwest
- Location: 204 Southeast Oak Street, Portland, Multnomah, Oregon, 97214-1018, United States
- Coordinates: 45.51994°N 122.663495°W
- Website: producerowcafe.com

Produce Row Café, or Produce Row, is a restaurant and craft beer bar in Portland, Oregon's Buckman neighborhood, in the United States.

== Description ==
In 2016, Martin Cizmar of Willamette Week wrote, "Before it closed in 2014, Produce Row was a 40-year tradition of beer and music—home to multiple generations of Portland's music scene, going from the de facto homebase of Portland's pre-millennial indie-rock crowd to an unlikely IDM/EDM hang in the 2000s, before being revamped in 2008 into a New Portland beer hall and unlikely patio DJ hub—hosting international hip-hop night the Do-Over."

== History ==
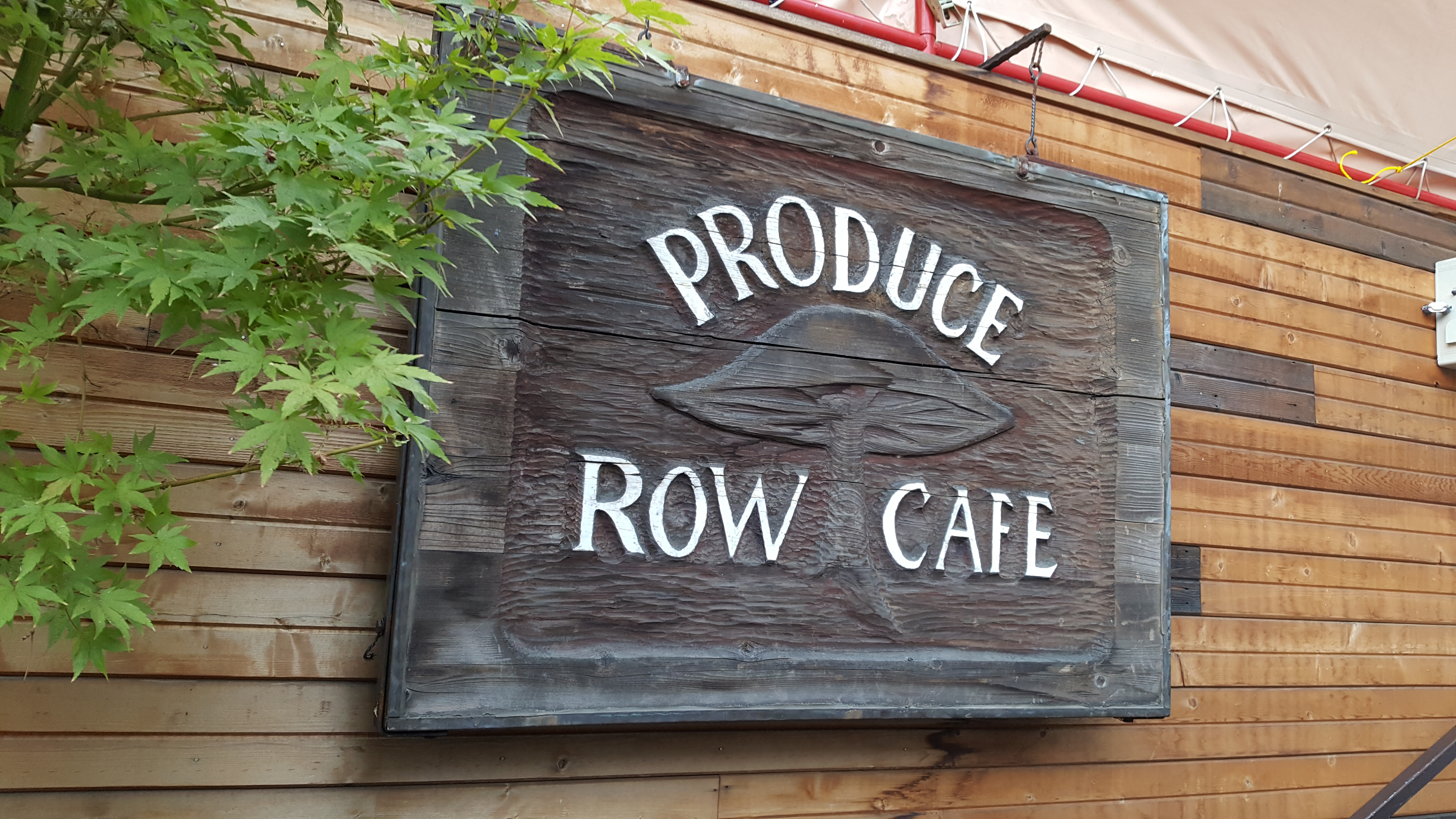
Signage for the cafe in 2017

The building was built in 1951 and opened as a breakfast café for produce dockworkers in 1953; it was also a barbershop at one point. Produce Row originally opened in 1953 as a breakfast café for the produce dockworkers.

Mike McMenamin had worked as a sandwich maker in college and was interested in a career in the food industry; after graduating from Oregon State University with a degree in political science in 1974, he and two college friends bought the landmark Produce Row Café, which was Portland's warehouse and wholesale district. The brothers sold "The Row" to the employees in 1978.

It was purchased by Alan Davis in the 2000s. In 2014, Produce Row closed after operating for more than forty years.

In 2015, Davis sold Produce Row to Josh Johnston and James Hall, who reopened the restaurant and bar in May 2015.

The restaurant participated in Portland's Dumpling Week in 2026.

== See also ==
- List of Pacific Northwest restaurants
