= MÄS =

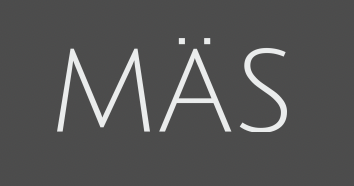

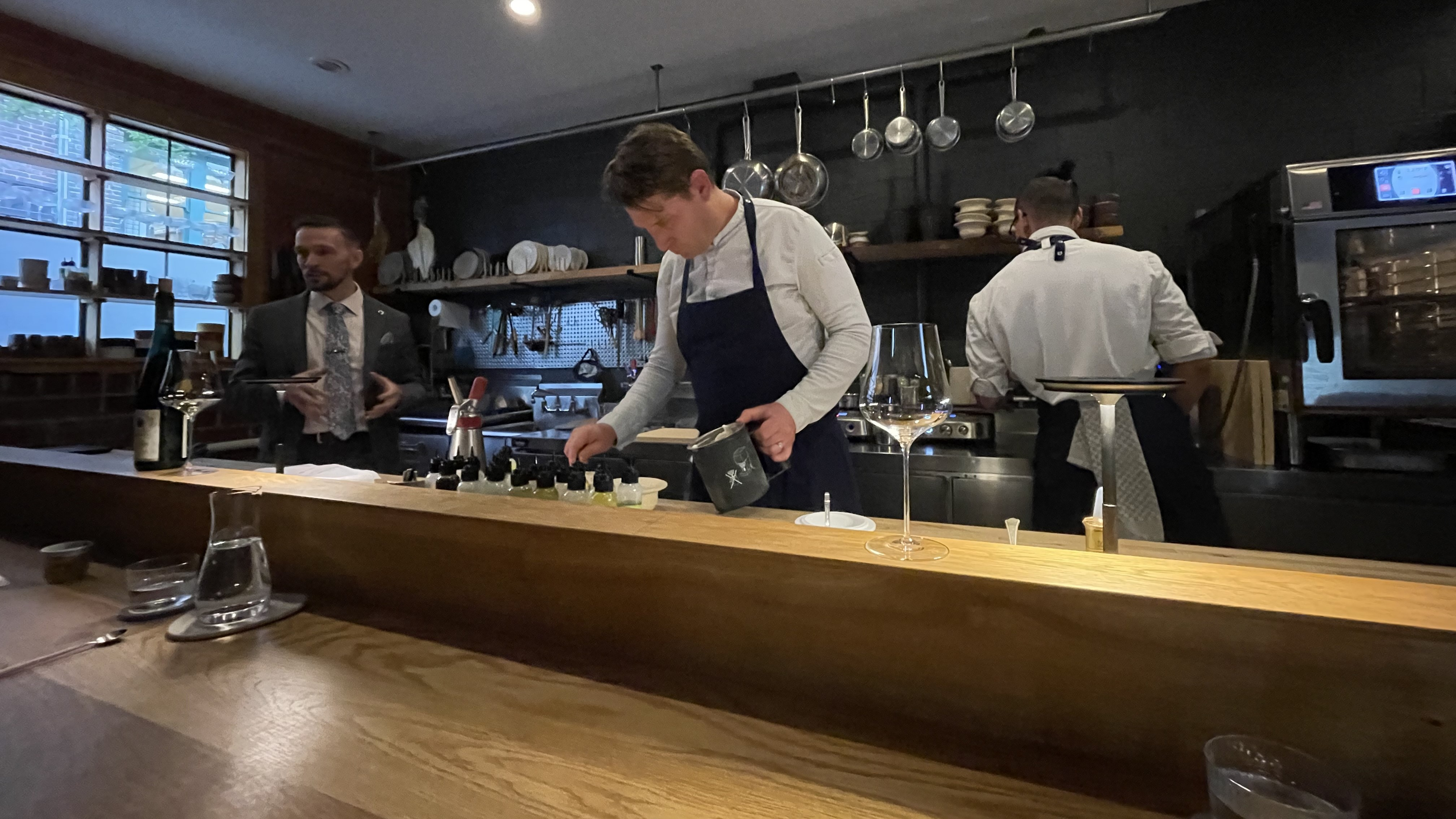
- Chef Josh Dorcak (right) and sommelier Joseph Shaughnessy (left) in the middle of dinner service at the chefs counter.
- Interactive map of MÄS

Restaurant information
- Owner: Josh Dorcak
- Chef: Josh Dorcak
- Food type: Cascadian; Pacific Northwest
- Location: 141 Will Dodge Way, Ashland, Oregon, 97520, United States
- Coordinates: 42°11′49″N 122°42′47.5″W
- Website: masashland.com

MÄS is a Pacific Northwest restaurant in Ashland, Oregon. Chef Josh Dorcak opened the restaurant in 2018.

== Description ==
MÄS is a 16-seat tasting menu restaurant in Ashland, Oregon, featuring seafood-focused Cascadian (or Pacific Northwest) cuisine. The menu has included duck breast with acorn miso and maple blossoms, corn dashi chawanmushi with King crab and goat milk, foraged sea lettuces, lamb, and Wagyu.

== History ==
Chef Josh Dorcak opened the 16-seat tasting menu restaurant in 2018.

== Reception ==
In 2022, MÄS was included in The New York Times' list of the top 50 restaurants in the U.S. Megan duBois selected MÄS for Oregon in Eat This, Not That's 2022 list of the best farm-to-table restaurants in each U.S. state. Susanne Robertson included the business in Eater Portland's 2022 list of Ashland's 20 "essential" eateries. In 2023, Dorcak was nominated in the Best Chef: Northwest and Pacific category of the James Beard Foundation Awards.

== See also ==
- List of Pacific Northwest restaurants
- List of seafood restaurants
