= Lincoln Restaurant =

Defunct restaurant in Portland, Oregon, U.S.

- Interactive map of Lincoln Restaurant

Restaurant information
- Established: 2008
- Closed: March 2017
- Food type: Pacific Northwest; Italian
- Location: 3808 North Williams Avenue, Portland, Multnomah, Oregon, 97227, United States
- Coordinates: 45.5507°N 122.6665°W

Lincoln Restaurant, or simply Lincoln, was a restaurant in Portland, Oregon. The menu included Pacific Northwest cuisine, seasonal small plates, and Italian pastas.

== History ==
Jenn Louis and co-owner/spouse David Welch opened Lincoln in 2008. In 2013, the restaurant began hosting gnocchi tastings ahead of Louis' gnocchi cookbook. Cory Chunn served as the Chef de Cuisine at the time, overseeing menu development.

The restaurant closed in March 2017.

== Reception ==
Portland Monthly says, "Lincoln soothes more than it struts, as evidenced by its straightforward, minimalist menu and sturdy fir tables. Louis eschews big flavors and gimmickry for freshness and balance. Her dishes are ingredient-driven and satisfying, perhaps a signature appetizer of two eggs baked with cream and chopped green olives, or a ribeye steak with braised leeks and a poached duck egg. The warehouse space has been remodeled, but nothing about this restaurant is new-fangled."

== See also ==
- List of Italian restaurants
- List of Pacific Northwest restaurants
