= Okta (restaurant) =

Restaurant in McMinnville, Oregon, U.S.

Okta Farm & Kitchen
- Interactive map of Okta Farm & Kitchen

Restaurant information
- Established: July 2022
- Owners: Tributary Hospitality Group, LLC
- Manager: Christine Langelier
- Head chef: Christine Smith
- Food type: Pacific Northwest
- Location: 618 Northeast 3rd Street, McMinnville, Yamhill, Oregon, 97128, United States
- Coordinates: 45°12′35.5″N 123°11′34.5″W
- Seating capacity: 26 people
- Website: www.tributaryhotel.com

Okta Farm & Kitchen (stylized as ōkta) is a Pacific Northwest restaurant in McMinnville, Oregon. Established in July 2022, the fine dining restaurant is located within the Tributary Hotel. Okta Farm & Kitchen was included in The New York Times's 2023 list of the 50 best restaurants in the United States.

== Description ==
The restaurant's name was taken from the word "okta", a unit of measurement for cloud cover. Okta Farm & Kitchen's main building was renovated from a hardware store, while the surrounding farm was previously a cherry orchard. Okta Farm & Kitchen had a seating capacity of 26 people.

Serving Pacific Northwest cuisine, the restaurant's menu included lacto-fermented peppers with rockfish and morels with caviar and in-house brioche. Other dishes included hazelnut tofu and cedar-smoked caviar. The menu rotated seasonally, and ingredients were sourced from their own farm.

== History ==
Okta was established in July 2022 by chef Matthew Lightner and vineyard owners Katie Jackson and Shaun Kajiwara. Lightner previously worked at restaurants including Castagna, Noma, and Atera.

The restaurant closed in September 2024, then was re-opened in May 2025 by Tributary Hospitality Group, LLC.

== Reception ==
Okta Farm & Kitchen was a semifinalist for the 2024 James Beard Awards in the category "Best Chef: Northwest and Pacific". The restaurant was included in The New York Times's 2023 list of the 50 best restaurants in the United States and in Time magazine's 2023 list of the World's Greatest Places in Willamette Valley.

== See also ==
- List of defunct restaurants of the United States
- List of Pacific Northwest restaurants
