= Clarklewis =

Restaurant in Portland, Oregon, U.S.

- The restaurant's exterior, 2022
- Interactive map of Clarklewis

Restaurant information
- Established: 2003
- Food type: American; Pacific Northwest
- Location: 1001 Southeast Water Avenue, Portland, Multnomah, Oregon, United States
- Coordinates: 45.5152°N 122.6660°W
- Website: clarklewispdx.com

Clarklewis is a restaurant in Portland, Oregon, United States. It was established in 2003 and operates in southeast Portland's Buckman neighborhood.

== Description ==
Clarklewis serves Italian-inspired Pacific Northwest cuisine in an industrial space in southeast Portland's Buckman neighborhood. The menu has included Cortez Bay scallop ceviche, Pacific halibut with pancetta, chicken and Mulino Marino polenta, and orecchiette with gold potatoes, green beans, and pesto, among other pasta dishes. The LGBTQ-owned restaurant has used meat from the bison ranch Rain Shadow El Rancho in Scio, Oregon.

== History ==
The restaurant was established in 2003. Michael and Naomi Hebberoy were co-owners, as of 2005. Bruce Carey was an owner in 2020. Joe Rogers was a co-owner in 2026.

Morgan Brownlow was a chef. Daniel Mattern and Roxana Jullapat were chefs during 2007–2008. Kyo Koo has the sous chef for three years, as of 2011. Dolan Lane was a chef during 2011–2012, and became chef of Bluehour in January 2013. Lane has also been credited as a co-owner of Clarklewis via Bruce Carey's restaurant group, from which he departed in 2014.

In 2018, sous-chef Brandon Stein replaced chef Alex Diestra and Brandi Lansill was hired as the pastry chef.

Clarklewis added the private dining space, called The Kindling Room, in 2010. The restaurant hosts an annual outdoor Independence Day celebration ("Outdoor American Dinner and Fireworks Party"). In 2014, a woman filed a lawsuit again the restaurant after tripping over a wooden stump used as a doorstop. Clarklewis installed a nearby rooftop garden for produce production in 2015.

In 2026, there was an altercation between protesters and a group dining at the restaurant, resulting in damage including a broken window.

== Reception ==
Portland Monthly has said the restaurant "was an overnight sensation". Clarklewis was named Restaurant of the Year by The Oregonian. In 2026, the newspaper's Isabel Funk said the business "helped pioneer farm-to-table fine dining in Portland".

== See also ==
- List of Pacific Northwest restaurants
