= Radar (restaurant) =

Restaurant in Portland, Oregon, U.S.

- Interactive map of Radar

Restaurant information
- Established: 2012
- Closed: April 15, 2022
- Owners: Lily Tollefsen; Jonathan Berube
- Food type: Modern American; Pacific Northwest; Scandinavian
- Location: 3951 North Mississippi Avenue, Portland, Multnomah, Oregon, 97227, United States
- Coordinates: 45.5516°N 122.6758°W

Radar was a restaurant in Portland, Oregon. The bar served Modern American, Pacific Northwest, and Scandinavian cuisine from 2012 to 2022.

== Description ==
Radar was a small restaurant on Mississippi Avenue in north Portland part of the Boise neighborhood. Fodor's described Radar as a Modern American restaurant, "equally appreciated as a drinking hole and source of reasonably priced, well-crafted" food, housed in "a long, narrow storefront space ... with exposed-brick walls, a long bar, open ducts, and high timber ceilings". Portland Monthly said the restaurant served Pacific Northwest and Scandinavian cuisine in a "raw-brick space, dominated by an open kitchen tucked behind a swooping bar counter". According to the newspaper, "The kitchen mingle[d] strong Scandinavian influences with Northwest twists and Northeast seafood", attracting "neighbors, strolling couples, and restaurant industry vets". Thrillist said Radar served American small plates and craft cocktails in a narrow space "while also showing the best European football ... from the continent's top leagues". The website's Alex Frane described Radar as a "family owned brunch restaurant with a European touch", serving "classic Northwestern fare with a Scandinavian touch". He said the restaurant offered "comforting brunch food, playful brunch cocktails, and friendly service".

Small plates included: escargot; cauliflower fritters; fish; kale salad with peanut dressing, mint, and raisins; Manila clams with chorizo and chickpeas; and pork shoulder braised with cotija cheese grits and chili puree. The Rose City cocktail had dry vermouth, raspberry and lemon juice, gin, and soda, and the Night Owl had Elijah Craig bourbon, cocoa-nib Ramazzotti, and pecan bitters. The European Union had Hayman's Old Tom gin, Busnel calvados, sweet vermouth, Strega, and bitters. Radar's gin and tonics were made with house-made tonic water. According to Bon Appétit, radishes were cooked in butter and topped with sea salt. The business imported bluefish regularly for pâté. For brunch, Radar served potato cakes with apple sauce and creme fraîche or smoked fish hash, as well as a full English breakfast with black pudding, baked beans, and tomato.

== History ==
Spouses Lily Tollefsen and Jonathan Berube opened Radar in 2012. The restaurant was named after Tollefsen's father Skip Radar Tollefsen, who owned a seafood restaurant on Long Island; previously, she worked at her father's restaurant, the Lobster Inn, in Southampton, New York. In April 2022, the owners announced plans to close Radar on April 15. An announcement on social media said, "After ten years in business, we have decided to let Radar sail peacefully into the sunset. We leave Radar right where we want it to be. Busy, bustling, and strong as ever." No specific reason was given for the closure.

== Reception ==
Fodor's said Radar is "one of the top spots in the neighborhood for weekend brunch" and recommended the Swedish pancakes with huckleberries. Radar was included in Portland Monthly's 2014 overview of the city's "best bars of the moment", and the magazine called the Night Owl "one of our fave bourbon drinks in town". In 2017, Sami Gaston included Radar in Willamette Week's list of recommended eateries in the Mississippi-Albina area. Gaston described the restaurant as an "intimate oasis" and wrote, "Don't let the unassuming exterior mislead you... [Radar is] the best spot in the neighborhood for date night." Alex Frane selected Radar to represent the Mississippi Avenue area in Thrillist's 2019 list of "The Best Brunch Spots in 17 Portland Neighborhoods".

Following news of the closure, Eater Portland's Brooke Jackson-Glidden said Radar was known for its "inventive brunch and date night vibes", and wrote:

For a decade, a tiny sliver of a restaurant on North Mississippi has been a neighborhood stalwart, consistently punching above its weight. Radar, with its brick wall and lengthy chef's counter, has served as one of the city's best brunch spots, plating scotch eggs and smoked bluefish paté in a sea of bacon and sunny-side ups. It's emblematic of a specific era of Portland restaurant, before seasonal and local became the norm.

== See also ==
- List of New American restaurants
- List of Pacific Northwest restaurants
- List of Scandinavian restaurants
