= Amaterra =

Winery in the U.S. state of Oregon

- Logo

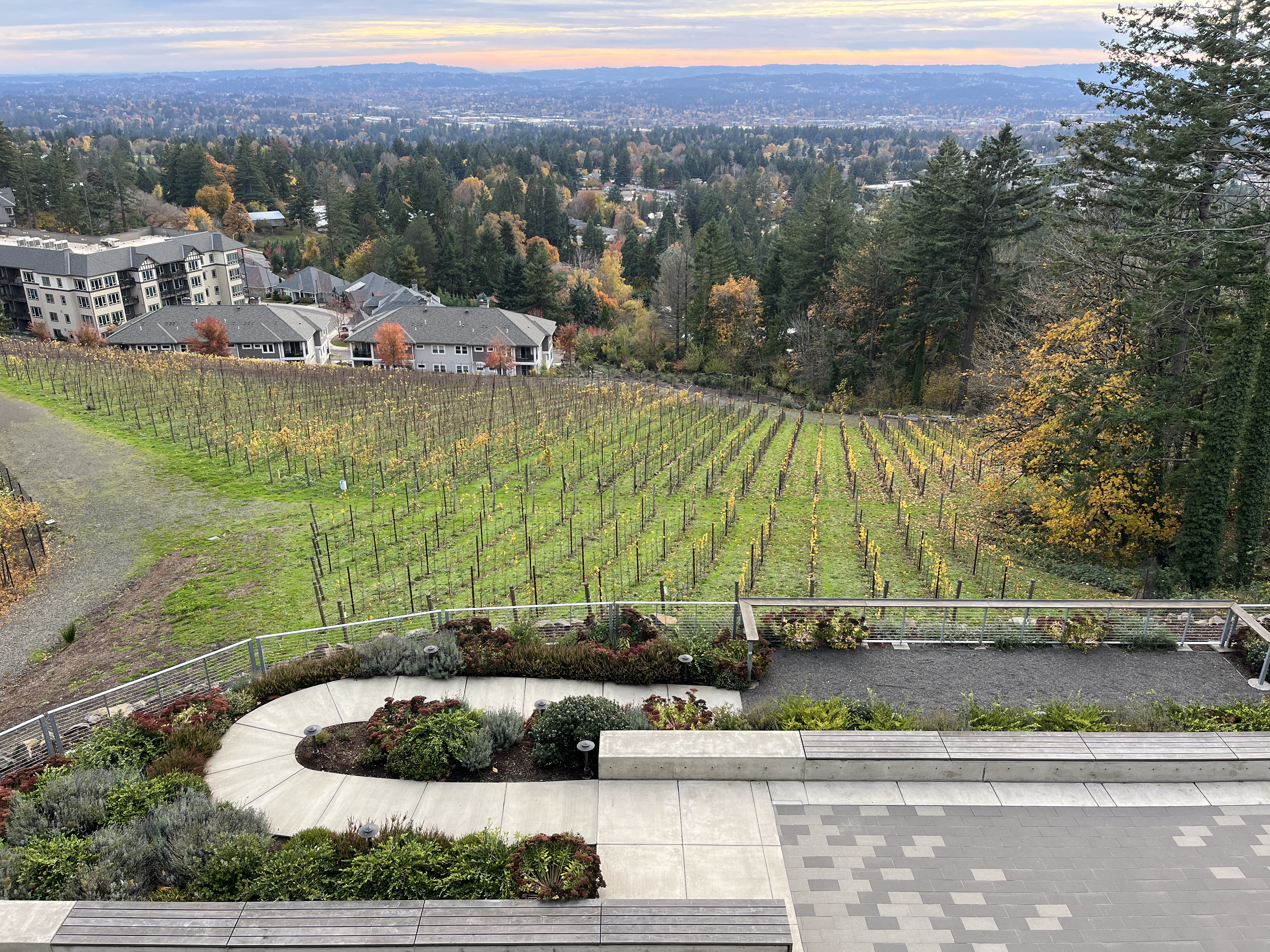
- Vineyard at Amaterra, near Portland, Oregon, in 2025
- Location: Oregon, United States
- Coordinates: 45°30′59″N 122°45′34″W

Amaterra is a membership-based urban winery, vineyard, restaurant, and tasting room in the U.S. state of Oregon. The business operates in West Haven-Sylvan in the Portland metropolitan area, as well as Bend.

Amaterra has been described as "sleek". The restaurant serves Pacific Northwest cuisine.

== See also ==
- List of Pacific Northwest restaurants
- List of vineyards and wineries
- Oregon wine
  - History of Oregon wine
