= List of Pacific Northwest restaurants =

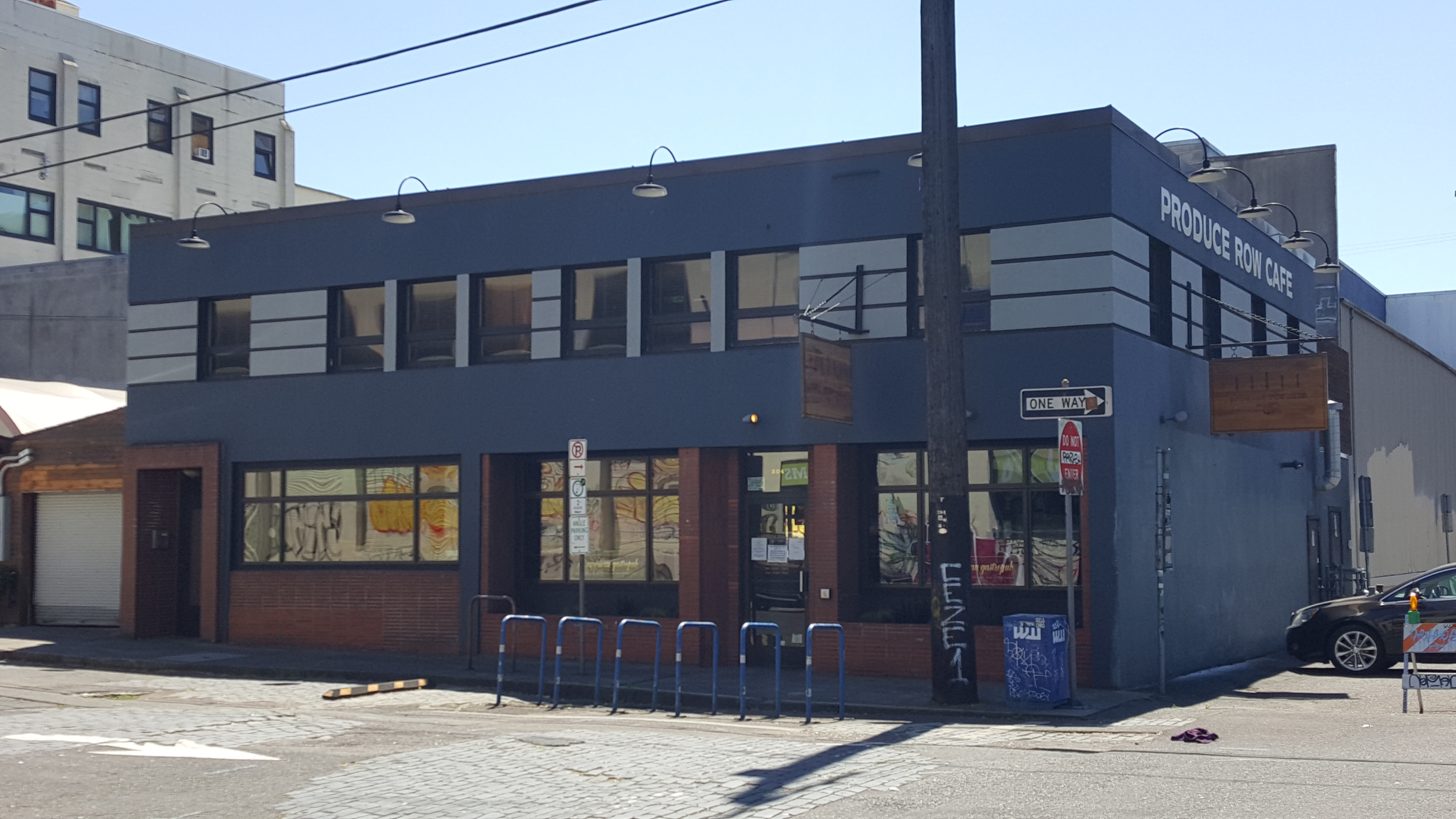
Produce Row Café, Portland, Oregon

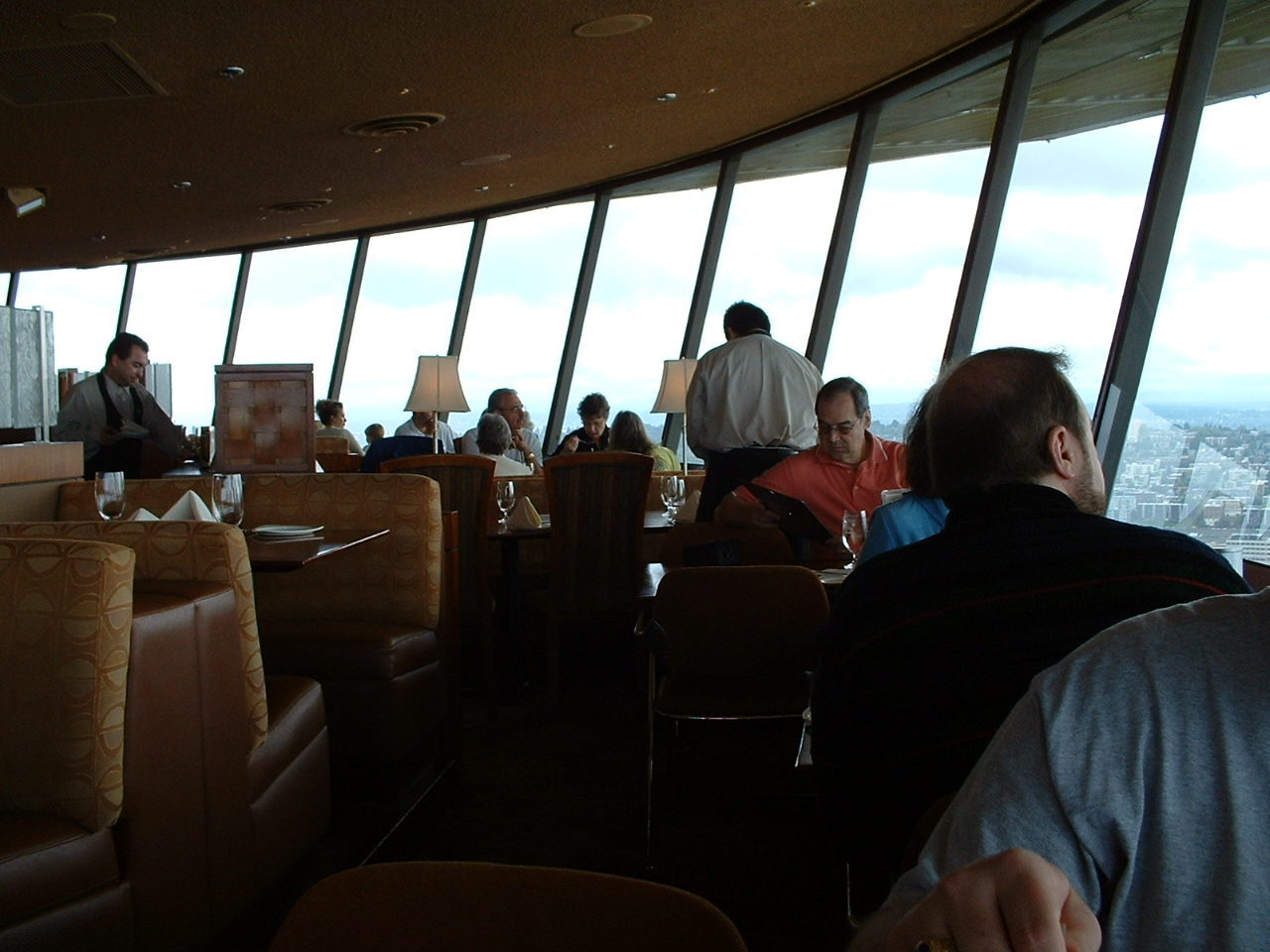
SkyCity, Seattle

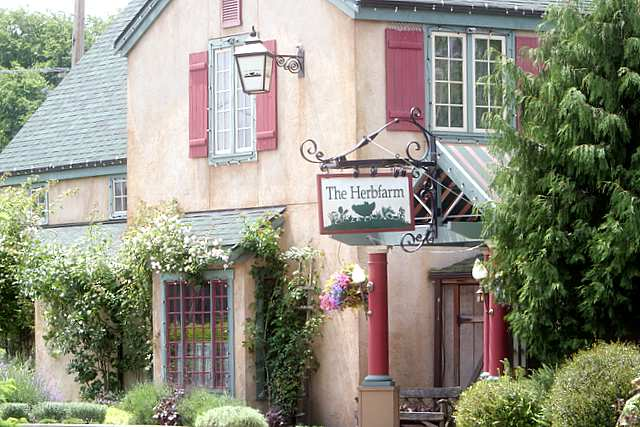
The Herbfarm, Woodinville, Washington

Following is a list of notable restaurants known for serving Pacific Northwest cuisine:

- Amaterra, Oregon, U.S.
- Arden, Portland, Oregon
- Beast (2007–2020), Portland, Oregon
- Canlis, Seattle
- Clarklewis, Portland, Oregon
- Dahlia Lounge, Seattle
- Dóttir (2019–2022), Portland, Oregon
- Farm Spirit, Portland, Oregon
- Fenouil, Portland, Oregon
- The Herbfarm, Woodinville, Washington
- Jacqueline (2016), Portland, Oregon
- L'Orange, Portland, Oregon
- Lilia Comedor, Portland, Oregon
- Lincoln Restaurant (2008–2017), Portland, Oregon
- Lovely Hula Hands (2003–2009), Portland, Oregon
- The Malarkey (2026), Portland, Oregon
- MÄS, Ashland, Oregon
- Metrovino (2009–2013), Portland, Oregon
- Ned Ludd, Portland, Oregon
- Off Alley, Seattle
- Okta, McMinnville, Oregon
- Palace Kitchen, Seattle
- Paley's Place (1995–2021), Portland, Oregon
- Produce Row Café, Portland, Oregon
- Radar (2012–2022), Portland, Oregon
- Single Shot, Seattle
- SkyCity, Seattle
- Terra Plata, Seattle
- Tin Table, Seattle
- Wildwood (1994–2014), Portland, Oregon
