= The Korean Mama =

Internet influencer

- Other name: Jane Kim

Jane Kim, known as The Korean Mama, is an Internet celebrity with a large following on TikTok. She is often filmed by her son Ed Kim. Based in the Portland metropolitan area, the duo explores Pacific Northwest cuisine, and Jane Kim's catchphrase is "I'm so hungry!" The first "Korean Mama" video was posted in May 2022.

Jane Kim reunited with one of her other sons in 2024. She led a pre-game walk at a Portland Thorns game in 2025.
