= Palace Kitchen =

Restaurant in Seattle, Washington, U.S.

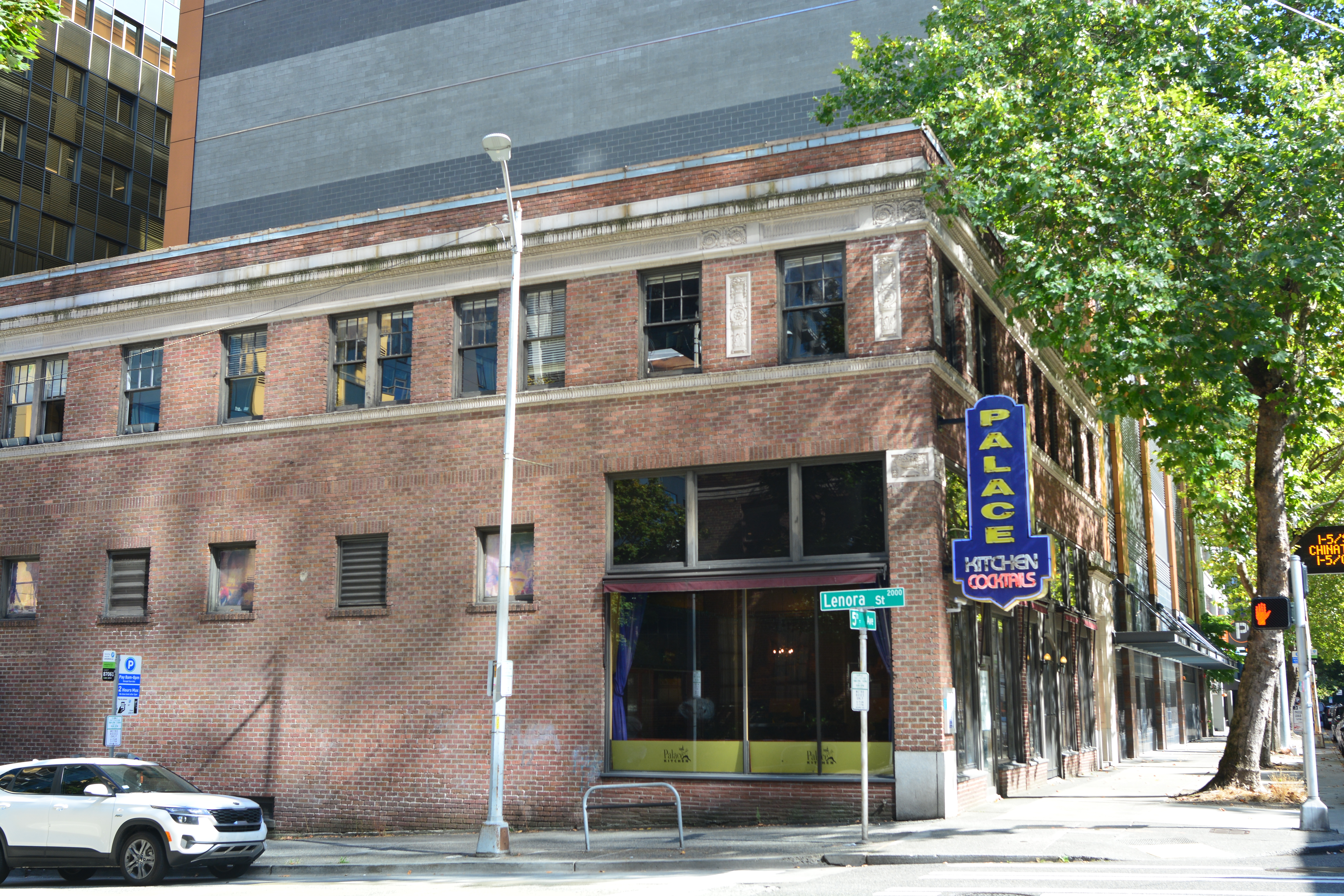
- The restaurant's exterior in 2021
- Interactive map of Palace Kitchen

Restaurant information
- Food type: Pacific Northwest
- Location: 2030 5th Avenue, Seattle, Washington, 98121, United States
- Coordinates: 47.6146°N 122.3400°W
- Website: palacekitchen.com

Palace Kitchen is a Pacific Northwest restaurant in Seattle, Washington, in the United States.

== Description ==
Palace Kitchen is a Pacific Northwest restaurant serving "rustic" cuisine in Seattle's Belltown/Denny Triangle neighborhoods. The business has advertised itself as a "tavern with good food". The interior features a U-shaped bar and dim lighting. The menu has included burgers, chicken wings, and goat cheese lavender fondue.

== History ==
Owned by Tom Douglas, Palace Kitchen opened in 1996. It is his third restaurant. Harry Cheadle of Eater Seattle wrote, "In its heyday, the old-school establishment ... was a centerpiece of Belltown and a late-night industry hangout spot where cooks and bartenders would come after their shifts."

In 2016, Douglas replaced tipping with a 20 percent service charge at Palace Kitchen and two other restaurants. The restaurant closed in March 2020 because of the COVID-19 pandemic, and reopened three years later in April 2023.

== See also ==
- Impact of the COVID-19 pandemic on the restaurant industry in the United States
- List of Pacific Northwest restaurants
