= SkyCity =

Defunct restaurant and bar in Seattle, Washington, U.S.

Coordinates: 47°37′14″N 122°20′57″W

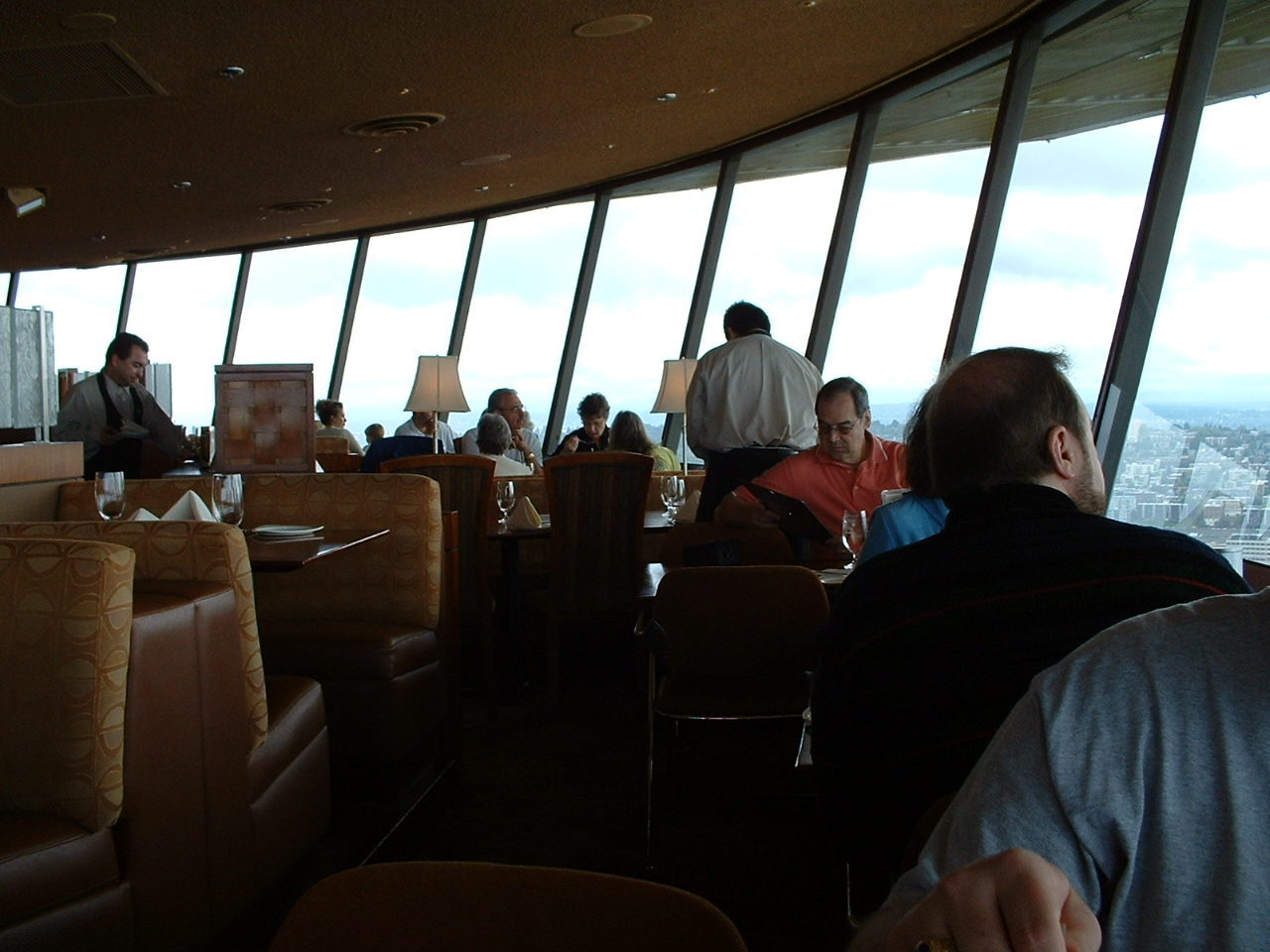
- SkyCity during a service in 2006
- Interactive map of SkyCity

Restaurant information
- Established: 1962
- Closed: 2017
- Owner: Space Needle Corporation
- Head chef: Jeff Maxfield
- Food type: Fine dining, Pacific Northwest cuisine, new American cuisine
- Dress code: Casual
- Location: Space Needle; 400 Broad Street; Seattle, Washington, U.S.
- Reservations: Yes

SkyCity (originally known as the Eye of the Needle) was a revolving restaurant and bar situated atop the Space Needle in Seattle, Washington, United States.

== Description and history ==
The restaurant featured a 14-foot-deep (4.3 m) carousel (or ring-shaped) dining floor on which sat patrons' tables, chairs, and dining booths. Its floor revolved on a track and wheel system weighing roughly 125 tons, moving at a rate of one revolution every 47 minutes. It was the oldest operating revolving restaurant in the world at the time of its closure. Due to the balance and precision of its design, the floor's rotation is accomplished using just a single 1½-horsepower motor.

The restaurant was designed by John Graham & Company and styled after the La Ronde they had built atop the Ala Moana Center in 1961. SkyCity was a fine dining restaurant with a casual dress code and served Pacific Northwest cuisine and new American cuisine, providing local seafood, steak, chicken and vegetarian items among others.

The restaurant was closed in September 2017 for the $100 million "The Century Project" renovation at the Space Needle, with plans for the dining area to be outfitted with a clear glass floor. The glass floor would enable diners to view the city below them and also the mechanics that operate the revolving floor. When completed, SkyCity was to have the world's first revolving restaurant with a glass floor. It was replaced with the Loupe Lounge, a cocktail lounge that opened in the restaurant's former space on April 9, 2021.

== See also ==
- List of defunct restaurants of the United States
- List of New American restaurants
- List of Pacific Northwest restaurants
