= The Malarkey =

Restaurant in Portland, Oregon, U.S.

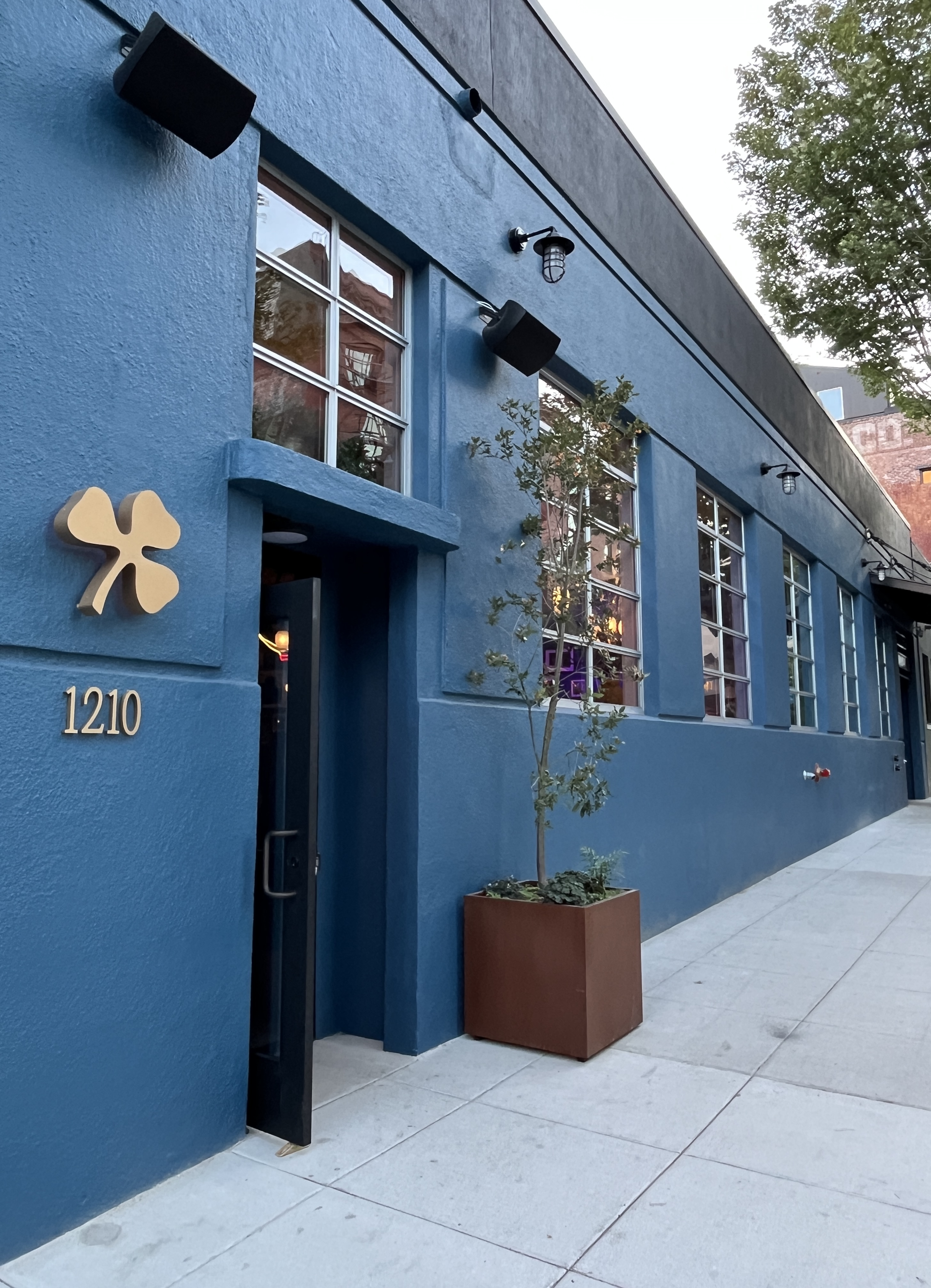
- The restaurant's exterior, 2026
- Interactive map of The Malarkey

Restaurant information
- Owners: Brian Malarkey; James Malarkey
- Manager: Britt Starkey
- Head chef: Jose "Lalo" Camarena
- Chef: Carlos Anthony Ochoa
- Food type: Pacific Northwest; seafood
- Location: 1210 Northwest Hoyt Street, Portland, Multnomah, Oregon, United States
- Coordinates: 45.5271°N 122.6836°W
- Seating capacity: 250
- Website: themalarkeypdx.com

The Malarkey is a steakhouse and seafood restaurant in Portland, Oregon, United States. It opened in northwest Portland's Pearl District in 2026 and serves Pacific Northwest cuisine.

== Description ==
The wood-fired steakhouse and seafood restaurant The Malarkey operates at the intersection of 12th Avenue and Hoyt Street in northwest Portland's Pearl District. The 10,000-square-foot space has a seating capacity of 250 people. Meira Gebel of Axios Portland has described the restaurant as "part maximalist fever dream, part Portland love letter". The Malarkey hosts disc jockeys on select nights.

=== Interior ===
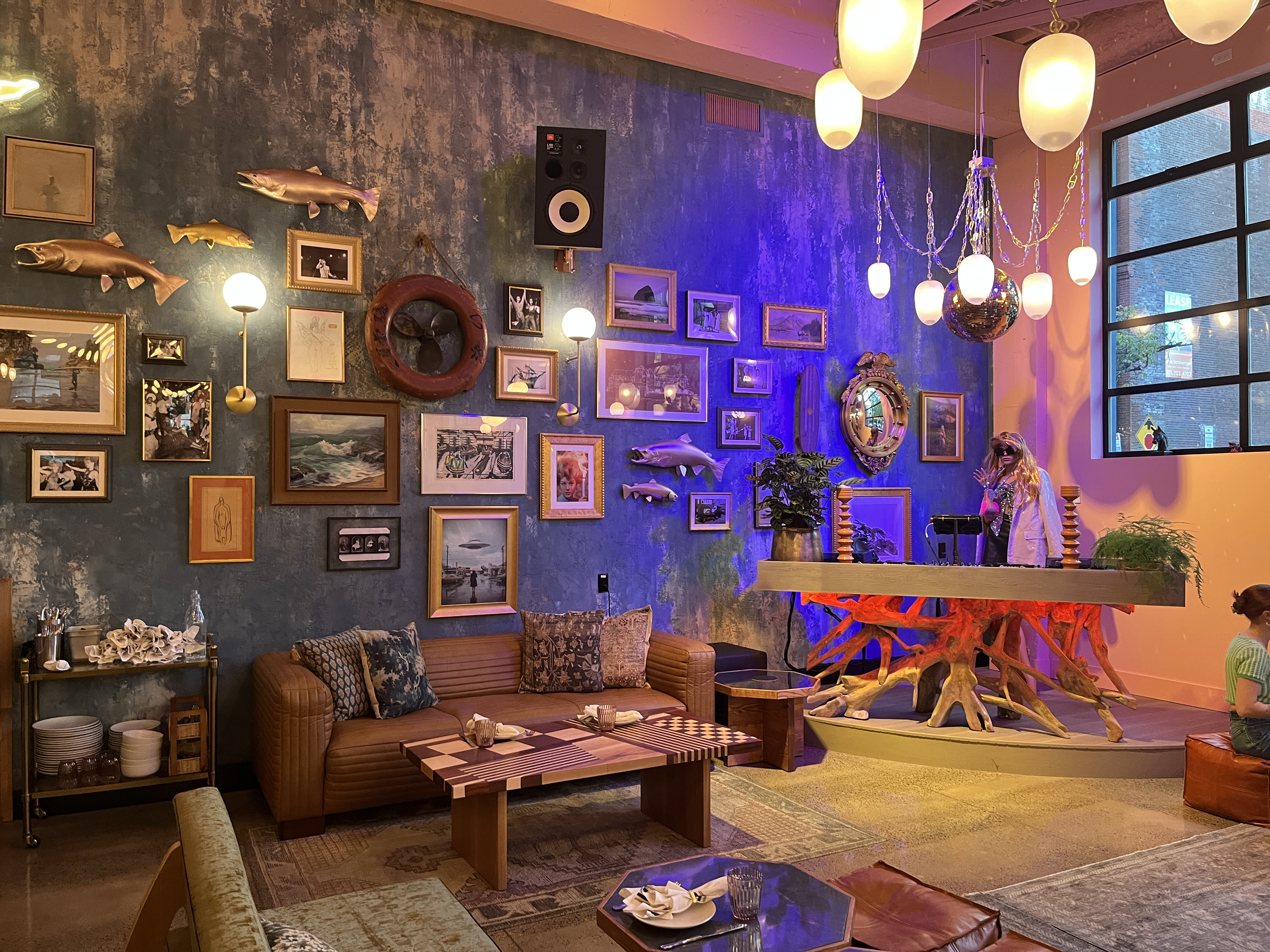
The restaurant's interior, 2026

The Portland-themed interior, described by Zoe Baillargeon of Eater Portland as "eclectic", has a music posters and a structure commemorating Old Town Chinatown. The restaurant's entrance has a ramp inspired by the Oregon Coast, featuring hand-drawn Meier & Frank fashion advertisements created by the owners' grandmother for The Oregonian during the 1950s and 1960s. The Malarkey also has a replica of the Jantzen Beach diving girl sign and a stage resembling a bonfire made of driftwood.

The main dining room is inspired by the city's Tualatin Mountains (also known as the West Hills) and has velvet booths and paintings of notable locals on the walls. There are paintings of drag performer Darcelle XV, jazz pianist Janice Scroggins, and the owners' mother, who was a horse trainer at Portland Meadows. The dining tables are narrow and there are potted ferns hanging from the ceiling. Another room has graffiti and train-car doors. One of the two private dining areas is inspired by Enchanted Forest, an amusement park in Turner.

Some of the walls and ceiling are painted bubblegum pink. A motorcycle mounted to one wall references the 1991 film My Own Private Idaho and a stag statue above one bar is inspired by the Thompson Elk Fountain. There is also a statue of Nike imported from Italy and stripper poles in the bathrooms. The event space can accommodate up to 60 people and has a "psychedelic forest" theme, with animals painted on the walls and branches on the ceiling. One sunken bar is mid-century modern and another area is inspired by Hazel Ying Lee, who was born in Portland and became the first Chinese-American woman to fly airplanes for the U.S. military. The Portlandia-themed hallway has bird replicas.

=== Menu ===
The restaurant uses Pacific Northwest ingredients. Seafood includes bay shrimp, beef, clams, halibut, oysters, Oregon albacore, salmon, and venison. The hemp-raised beef is supplied by one of the owner's own ranch in Central Oregon. The menu also has baked potatoes, Caesar salads, ceviche, crab cakes, roasted chicken, fritters with geoduck, an apple tart served à la mode, and Mexican-American options. Steak is served with salsa verde and horseradish cream. The Caesar has halibut ceviche with albacore, oysters, and salmon crudo. The aguachile has steelhead, cucumbers, and strawberries.

== History ==
Brothers Brian and James Malarkey opened the restaurant on July 31, 2026, in the space that previously housed Oba and had been vacant since 2017. The Malarkey is the 24th restaurant opened by Brian, but only the second with James. The Malarkey is the brothers' second restaurant in Oregon and the first in Portland.

Jose "Lalo" Camarena was confirmed as the opening executive chef in April 2026. The menu developed by Camarena and Brian Malarkey was influenced by both of their grandmothers' cooking and recipes. Britt Starkey and Alejandro de la Parra are the opening general manager and beverage director, respectively. Carlos Anthony Ochoa was hired as an opening chef.

== Reception ==
Approaching the restaurant's opening, Zoe Baillargeon of Eater Portland said to "expect an over-the-top and energetic dining experience befitting [Brian] Malarkey's showman style of hospitality".

== See also ==
- List of Pacific Northwest restaurants
- List of seafood restaurants
- List of steakhouses
