= Arden Wine Bar and Kitchen =

Wine bar in Portland, Oregon, U.S.

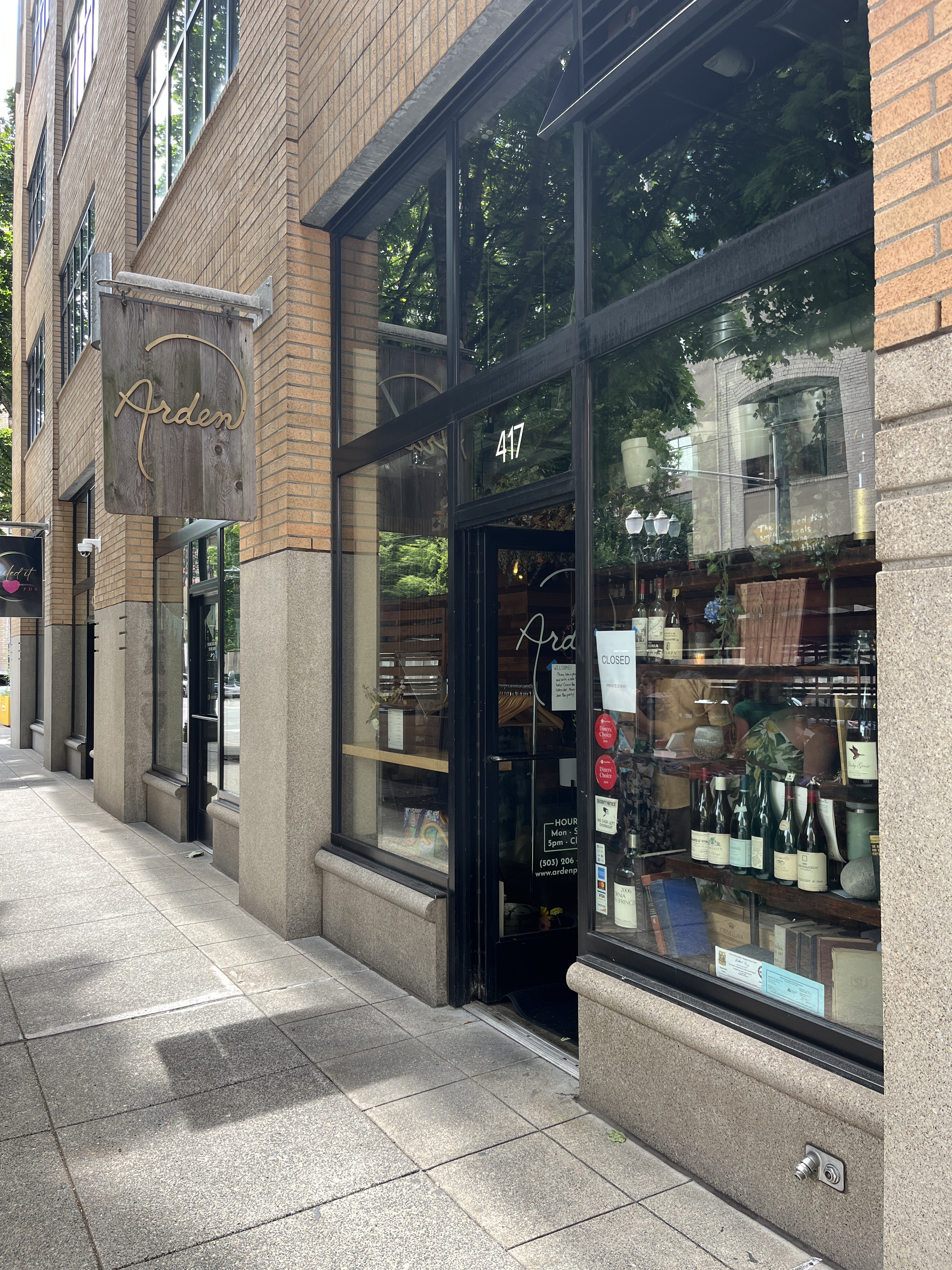
- The restaurant's exterior, 2025
- Interactive map of Arden Wine Bar and Kitchen

Restaurant information
- Food type: Pacific Northwest
- Location: 417 Northwest 10th Avenue, Portland, Multnomah, Oregon, 97209, United States
- Coordinates: 45.5261°N 122.6814°W
- Website: ardenpdx.com

Arden Wine Bar and Kitchen, or simply Arden, is a Pacific Northwest restaurant in Portland, Oregon, United States.

== Description ==
Named after the forrest of William Shakespeare, the Pacific Northwest restaurant and wine bar Arden operates in northwest Portland's Pearl District. Portland Monthly has described Arden as a "cozy" and candlelit establishment where "a stool at the bar lands a front-row view of the open kitchen". The restaurant has offered a tasting menu as well as à la carte options. Arden has served chorizo sausage, truffle pierogis, and a fennel salad.

== History ==
Arden is owned by Kelsey Glasser. Sara Hauman was the opening executive chef. Erik Van Kley became the chef in 2019.

Arden operates in the space that previously housed Coppia. In 2024, Arden hosted a fundraising dinner and reunion of the defunct restaurant Little Bird Bistro. In 2026, Arden was among local restaurants, community organizations, and other businesses that joined the "We Are Rip City" campaign in support of the Moda Center renovation project.

== Reception ==
In 2018, Michael Russell included Arden in The Oregonian's lists of Portland's ten best new restaurants and ten best new wine bars. In 2024, the business was included in The Oregonian's list of the best restaurant in downtown Portland and ranked first in the best restaurant category of the newspaper's Readers Choice Awards. Arden was also included in Portland Monthly's 2018 list of the city's fifteen best new bars.

In 2024, Arden was included in Wine Enthusiast's list of the 50 best wine restaurants in the nation, as well as Eater Portland's overview of the city's 38 best restaurants and food carts. Eater Portland also included the business in a list of the best restaurants and bars in the Pearl District, as well as another of "tasting menus and prix fixe dinners worth the price tag in Portland". The website's Brooke Jackson-Glidden and Thom Hilton included Arden in a list of 21 romantic restaurants and Bars in the city for a date. The website also included Arden in a 2025 overview of the best eateries in the Pearl District.

== See also ==
- List of Pacific Northwest restaurants
