= Dan and Louis Oyster Bar =

Seafood restaurant in Portland, Oregon, U.S.

Dan & Louis Oyster Bar
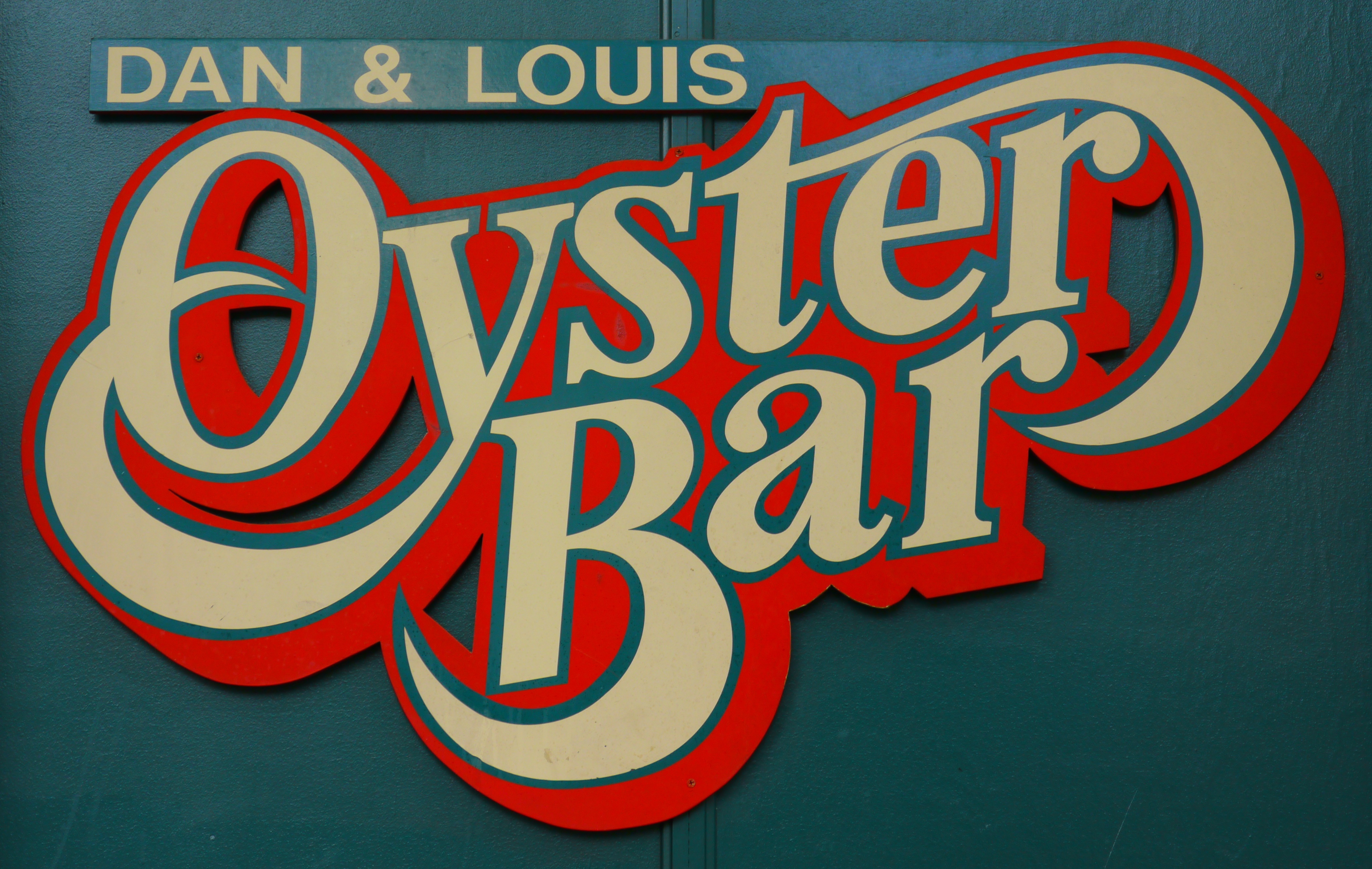

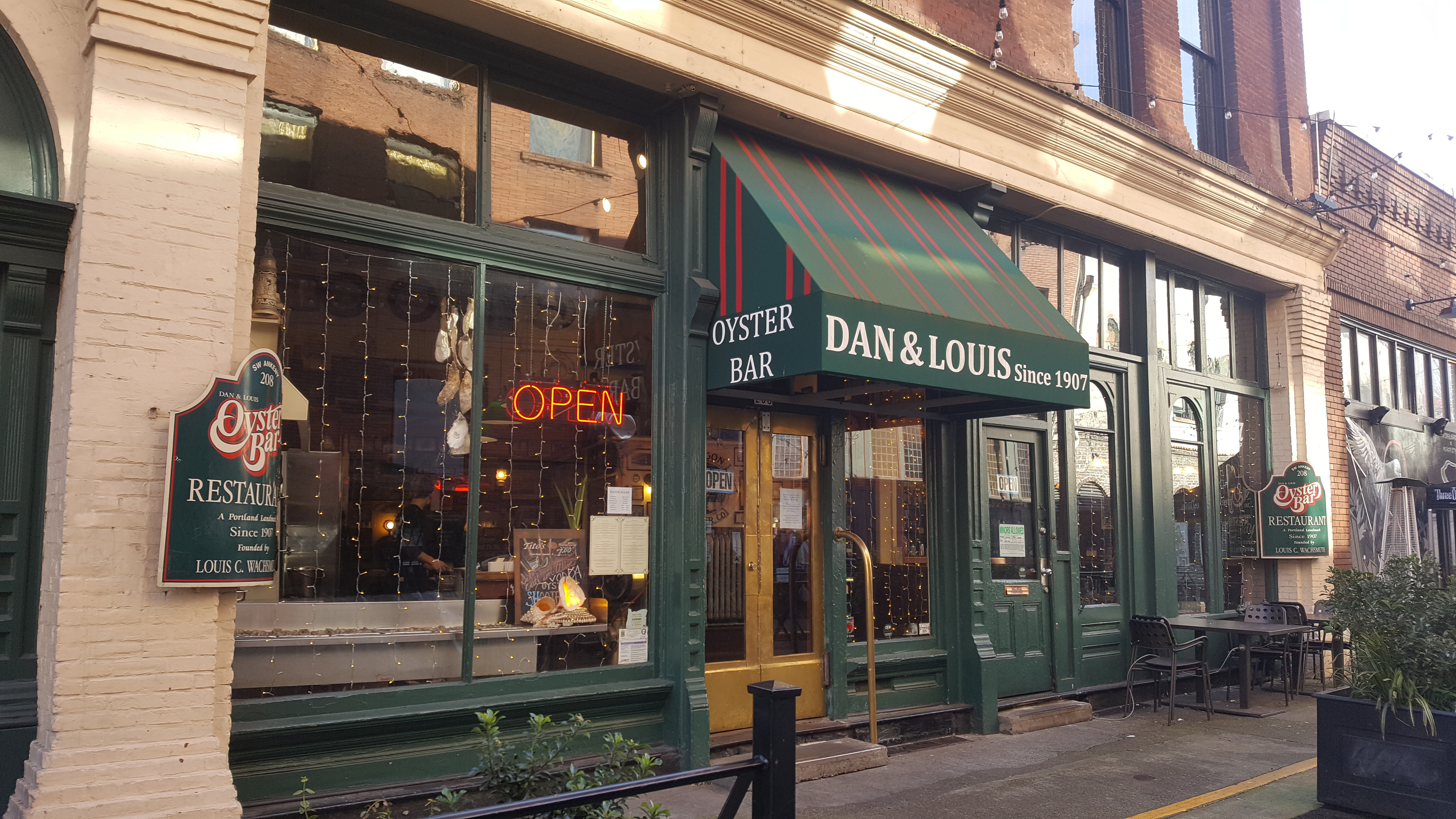
- The restaurant's exterior in 2022
- Interactive map of Dan & Louis Oyster Bar

Restaurant information
- Established: 1907
- Owner: Wachsmuth family
- Food type: Seafood
- Location: 208 SW Ankeny Street, Portland, Oregon, USA
- Coordinates: 45.52245°N 122.6726°W
- Website: http://www.danandlouis.com/

Dan & Louis Oyster Bar is a seafood restaurant in Portland, Oregon described by Fodor's as a "Portland landmark". As its name implies, it specializes in oysters — from Yaquina Bay and beyond — served raw and in an oyster stew the restaurant has been known for over 100 years.

The restaurant has been in business at the same location since 1907 when it was founded by Louis C. Wachsmuth as a raw oyster bar. Louis was the son of Meinert Wachsmuth, a Danish immigrant who had farmed his own oyster beds on Yaquina Bay. The bay became the home of a farm, the oldest in Oregon, established to provide the oyster bar with a regular supply of oysters.

Dan & Louis Oyster Bar is located in Old Town, at 208 SW Ankeny Street.

== History ==
A descendant of Meinert Wachsmuth, Cory Schreiber, began his restaurant career at Dan & Louis (at the age of 11); years later, he founded his own Portland-based restaurant (Wildwood) and won a James Beard Foundation Award for his cuisine.

The menu was expanded in 1919 when Wachsmuth took over the food bar of the Merchant's Exchange Saloon. Dining rooms were added in 1937 and 1940. The restaurant remains under Wachsmuth family ownership into the 21st century, and is currently operated by Meinert Keoni Wachsmuth.

Since Can Can Productions began operating shows from the Paris Theatre, the restaurant has seen an increase in the number of diners.

== See also ==
- List of oyster bars
- List of seafood restaurants
