= Paris Theater =

Paris Theater or Theatre may refer to:

- Paris Theatre, a former BBC radio studio in London
- Paris Theater (Manhattan)
- Paris Theatre (Portland, Oregon)

== See also ==
- Théâtre de Paris
- List of theatres and entertainment venues in Paris
