= Canlis =

Restaurant in Seattle, Washington, U.S.

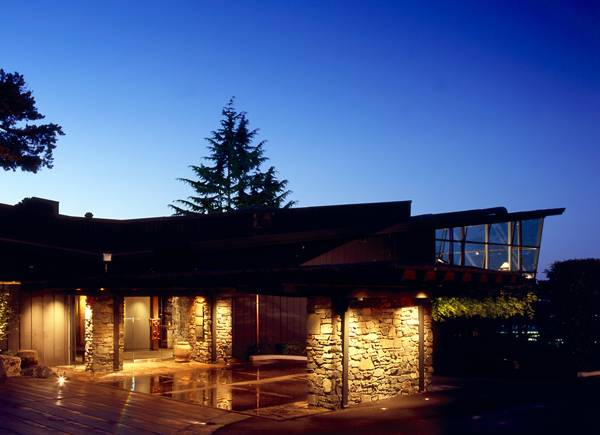
- The front entrance to Canlis
- Interactive map of Canlis

Restaurant information
- Established: 1950
- Owner: Mark Canlis
- Head chef: James Huffman
- Food type: New American, Pacific Northwest
- Location: 2576 Aurora Avenue North, Seattle, Washington, United States
- Coordinates: 47.643°N 122.3468°W
- Website: Official site

Canlis is a fine dining restaurant serving New American and Pacific Northwest cuisine in Seattle, Washington. Situated in the Queen Anne neighborhood, the restaurant has views of Gas Works Park and the Cascade Mountains. It was built by Peter Canlis in 1950, and remains family-owned. The restaurant currently employs over 100 people.

It is one of the most award-winning restaurants in the greater Northwest; it is ranked one of the top 20 restaurants in America by Gourmet Magazine, The New York Times called it "Seattle's fanciest, finest restaurant for over 60 years". Since 1997, Canlis has been a recipient of the Wine Spectator Grand Award.

== History ==
The restaurant was built by Peter Canlis and opened on December 11, 1950. Prior to coming to Seattle, Peter had run the Canlis Charcoal Broiler which opened in 1946 in Honolulu, Hawaii. He was convinced to open a Seattle location by Jack Peterson, a local contractor who had met Canlis on a trip to Hawaii. Peter hired local architect Roland Terry to design the Seattle building which soon became an icon for Northwest-inspired modern architecture. When the restaurant opened, the waitstaff wore kimonos.

Peter later opened additional Canlis restaurants in Honolulu (1954), Portland (1959), and San Francisco (1965). The restaurant is "credited with inventing Northwest cuisine when it opened in 1950", and Peter Canlis is personally credited for "singlehandedly develop[ing] what's now known as Pacific Northwest cuisine". In 1977, Peter Canlis died of lung cancer and his son, Chris Canlis, took over the restaurant with his wife, Alice. The couple ran Canlis for thirty years before handing off ownership to their sons, Mark and Brian Canlis. As of Feb 5, 2025 third-generation owner Brian Canlis planned to leave the restaurant to relocate to Nashville, Tenn., to work for restaurateur Will Guidara.

Canlis usually features a live pianist; Walt Wagner played there from 1996 to 2016.

== Dishes ==
The Canlis salad, which includes chopped romaine, bacon, tomatoes, romano, scallion, mint, oregano, and croutons in a lemony Caesar-like dressing, has been included on the menu since the restaurant's inception and is considered the restaurant's signature dish. The recipe was developed from one by Peter Canlis' Lebanese mother. It was originally made with dried herbs and sliced tomatoes but eventually evolved into using fresh herbs and cherry tomatoes. It is often tossed tableside.

== Chefs ==
8th - James Huffman - June 4, 2025 - current.

== Awards ==
- Wine Spectator: Grand Award Winner 1997–2022
- James Beard Awards: 15 total nominations with wins for Outstanding Wine Program (2017), Design Icon (2019), Best New Chef Northwest (2019) with Brady Williams

== See also ==
- List of New American restaurants
- List of Pacific Northwest restaurants
