= Walt Wagner =

American pianist

Walt Wagner (born 1943) is an American pianist, composer, and arranger. He is based in Seattle, Washington. He is most recently known as the longtime pianist for Seattle restaurant Canlis.

Wagner began on piano at age six, and took formal lessons in classical music while playing rock and roll on the side. Before he was born, his father had been a dance band leader. He played in a Seattle group called The Rebels, which later became The Exotics. The group was picked up by local radio station KJR, which resulted in bookings in dance halls throughout Washington state. Around 1960, The Exotics recorded a single for Jerden Records and opened in concert for Jerry Lee Lewis. In the 1960s, Wagner continued performing in Seattle-area restaurants, took college courses, and worked odd jobs, including at an A&W Restaurant, as a forklift operator for the Seattle shipyard, and at Boeing.

Throughout the 1970s, Wagner played in Sun Valley, Idaho, especially during ski season, and toured internationally as the pianist for Peggy Fleming's skating shows. In the off season he continued playing restaurants and also took work on cruise ships, which he continued to do into the 1980s. He met his future wife while performing on a cruise ship in 1987. They were married the same year.

In 1994, Boeing commissioned Wagner to compose a piece for the debut of its 777 jetliner. Wagner expanded the work into a full piano concerto, which he named "The Miracle".

Wagner became one of two house pianists at Seattle fine dining restaurant Canlis in 1996, where he played arrangements of popular songs. During this time he self-released several albums, including one of his own compositions recorded with the Seattle Symphony in 1998. He announced his retirement from Canlis in 2016, and record label Sub Pop recorded his final performance there on October 9. The resultant live album featured his renditions of songs by DJ Shadow, Band of Horses, Fleet Foxes, Prince, The Left Banke, Goat, The Buzzcocks, My Bloody Valentine, and Phoenix. Sub Pop released the album, entitled Reworks, in November 2017.

== Discography ==
- Walt Wagner in Sun Valley (1972)
- Caprice (1976)
- Walt Wagner (1979)
- The Evening Muse (1982)
- Spirit: Cherished Carols of Christmas (1986)
- The Miracle; Rhythms (1998, with Seattle Symphony, Gerard Schwarz conducting)
- Pearls, Volume 1 (2004)
- In the Pink: Music of Pink Floyd (2007)
- Reworks (2017)
