= Wildwood (restaurant) =

Defunct restaurant in Portland, Oregon, U.S.

- Interactive map of Wildwood

Restaurant information
- Established: May 1994
- Closed: February 25, 2014
- Previous owner: Cory Schreiber
- Head chef: Cory Schreiber; Dustin Clark
- Food type: Pacific Northwest; New American
- Location: Portland, Multnomah, Oregon, United States
- Coordinates: 45.53177°N 122.69478°W
- Website: wildwoodrestaurant.com

Wildwood Restaurant and Bar, or simply Wildwood, was a Pacific Northwest and New American restaurant in Portland, Oregon, in the United States. Operating from 1994 to 2014, the restaurant earned owner and founding chef Cory Schreiber a James Beard Foundation Award nomination in the Best Chef: Northwest category. Wendy Culverwell of Portland Business Journal described Wildwood as "a pioneer in the farm-to-table food movement".

== Description ==
Wildwood served Pacific Northwest and New American cuisine on 21st Avenue in northwest Portland's Northwest District. In 2008, Body & Soul described the restaurant as "upscale" with a "casual, Northwest feel". The restaurant was noted for locally sourced food from the region, and both a traditional wood-fired oven and clay tandoor. The menu included chicken, lamb, pork loin, rabbit, steak, salmon and other seafood such as mussels with saffron, garlic, and sun-dried tomatoes. Other ingredients included abalone, Chioggia beets, crayfish, and shell beans.

== History ==
Chef Cory Schreiber opened in Wildwood in May 1994. Jesse Dodson was head baker as of 2001. Dustin Clark became chef in October 2006. Jennifer Welshhons was the pastry chef as of 2010.

The restaurant closed on February 25, 2014. Samantha Bakall of The Oregonian said "lease negotiations were not met with an agreement".

== Reception ==
In 1995, Wildwood was named Restaurant of the Year by The Oregonian. Schreiber received a James Beard Foundation Award in the Best Chef: Northwest category in 1998. The restaurant received Nation's Restaurant News Fine Dining Hall of Fame designation in 2003.

The guide book Northwest Best Places (1995) rates Wildwood three stars. Best Places Portland (2001) and Best Places Northwest (2004) both rated the restaurant 3.5 out of 4 stars. In the 2005 book Insiders' Guide to Portland, Oregon, Rachel Dresbeck and Dave Johnson described Wildwood as a " destination spot" with "a loyal following". The authors of Explorer's Guide Oregon Wine Country (2011, 2013) called Wildwood "a champion for cooking from the source."

David Sarasohn of The Oregonian gave Wildwood a 'B' rating in 2011. In 2018, Karen Brooks of Portland Monthly said the restaurant "helped define Portland's emerging farm-to-table dining identity".

== See also ==
- James Beard Foundation Award: 1990s
- List of New American restaurants
- List of Pacific Northwest restaurants
