= Off Alley =

Restaurant in Seattle, Washington, U.S.

- Interactive map of Off Alley

Restaurant information
- Location: Seattle, Washington, United States
- Coordinates: 47°33′27.5″N 122°17′6.5″W
- Website: offalleyseattle.com

Off Alley is a restaurant in Columbia City, Seattle, in the U.S. state of Washington.

== Description ==
Off Alley is a restaurant on Rainier Avenue South in Columbia City, Seattle. Eater Seattle has said the restaurant serves Pacific Northwest "bistro food". The menu changes often and has included chilled tomato soup, turnip with rabbit heart, lamb tongue with wax beans, eel and farro, pork and prune pate, air-cured bison, and fried lamb's brains. Off Alley also operates as a wine bar.

== History ==
Established in August 2020, the business is operated by chef Evan Leichtling and partner Meghna Prakash in a space which previously housed La Teranga. In 2021, Heather Haddon of The Wall Street Journal wrote, "Off Alley began requiring diners to show proof of vaccination in late July. Co-owner Meghna Prakash said customers have generally been supportive but online backlash is taking a toll. Off Alley has received negative online reviews from people who haven't dined there, and she has been called discriminatory, Ms. Prakash said." In 2023, the pop-up Street Catz was held in the space during April 5–9. Off Alley implements a 20 percent service charge, as of 2023.

== Reception ==
Off Alley was included in The New York Times' best restaurants list in 2022. Brett Bankson of Eater Seattle said the business "is about as personal as restaurants get" and wrote, "Off Alley is a rare spot that concocts a synergy between wine and food, where menu decisions are in the service of educating guests and celebrating producers." The website also included Off Alley in a 2023 list of 38 "essential" Seattle restaurants.

== See also ==
- List of Pacific Northwest restaurants
