= Sara Hauman =

American chef

- Occupation: Chef

Sara Hauman is an American chef most known for competing on the television series Top Chef: Portland. She is a two-time James Beard Rising Star semi-finalist. She also received the Eater Young Gun 2015 award.

Hauman is from Vista, California. She earned a culinary degree from The Art Institute in 2008. When she was 22 years old, she moved to San Francisco and worked for chef Brandon Jew at Bar Agricole. She became chef de cuisine at Octavia in 2017.

After moving to Portland, Oregon, she was a chef at the wine bar Arden. She is the head chef at Soter Vineyards in Carlton, Oregon, as of 2021. Soter saw an uptick in business following Hauman's appearance on Top Chef.

Hauman's Tiny Fish Co. tinned shad is made for Jacob & Sons.
