= Ken's Artisan Bakery =

Bakery in Portland, Oregon, U.S.

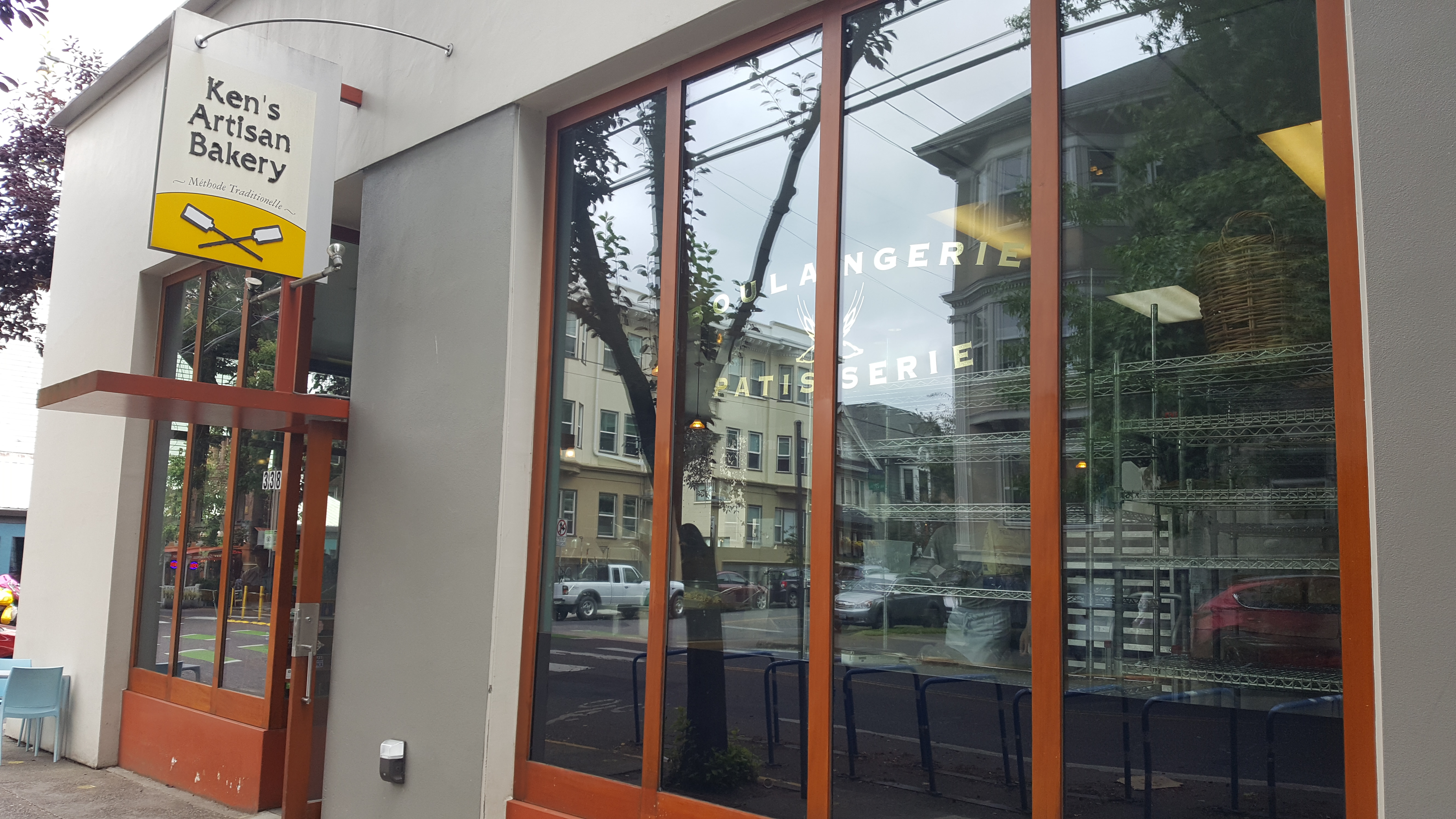
- The bakery's exterior in 2022
- Interactive map of Ken's Artisan Bakery

Restaurant information
- Established: 2001
- Owners: Randy Dorkin; Theo Taylor
- Previous owner: Ken Forkish
- Location: Portland, Oregon, United States
- Coordinates: 45.5255°N 122.6942°W
- Website: kensartisan.com

Ken's Artisan Bakery is a bakery in Portland, Oregon's Northwest District, in the United States.

== History ==
Ken Forkish established the bakery in 2001 and operated it until his retirement in 2021/22. Longtime employees Randy Dorkin and Theo Taylor are now co-owners.

== Reception ==
In 2022, Eater Portland's Brooke Jackson-Glidden called Ken's Artisan Bakery "an iconic Portland destination for bread and pastries". She also included the Oregon croissant in a 2024 overview of "iconic" Portland dishes. Michelle Lopez and Janey Wong included the business in Eater Portland's 2025 overview of the city's best bakeries. Michael Russell included the business in The Oregonian's 2025 list of the 21 best restaurants in southeast Portland.
