= Ken Forkish =

American chef and author

- Born: Maryland, U.S.

Ken Forkish is an American chef and author who owned Ken's Artisan Bakery and Ken's Artisan Pizza. Previously based in Portland, Oregon, Forkish has retired and relocated to Hawaii.

== Bibliography ==
- Flour Water Salt Yeast: The Fundamentals of Artisan Bread and Pizza (Clarkson Potter/Ten Speed Press, 2012, ISBN 160774273X, 978-1607742739)
- The Elements of Pizza: Unlocking the Secrets to World-Class Pies at Home (Clarkson Potter/Ten Speed Press, 2016, ISBN 160774838X, 978-1607748380)
- Evolutions in Bread: Artisan Pan Breads and Dutch-Oven Loaves at Home (Clarkson Potter/Ten Speed Press, 2022, ISBN 1984860372, 978-1984860378)
- Let's Make Bread!: A Comic Book Cookbook (Clarkson Potter/Ten Speed Graphic, 2024, ISBN 1984860879, 978-1984860873)

== See also ==
- James Beard Foundation Award: 2010s
- List of people from Portland, Oregon
- Pizza in Portland, Oregon
