= Paris Theatre (Portland, Oregon) =

Historic building in Portland, Oregon, U.S.

- Logo for Can Can's Paris Theatre

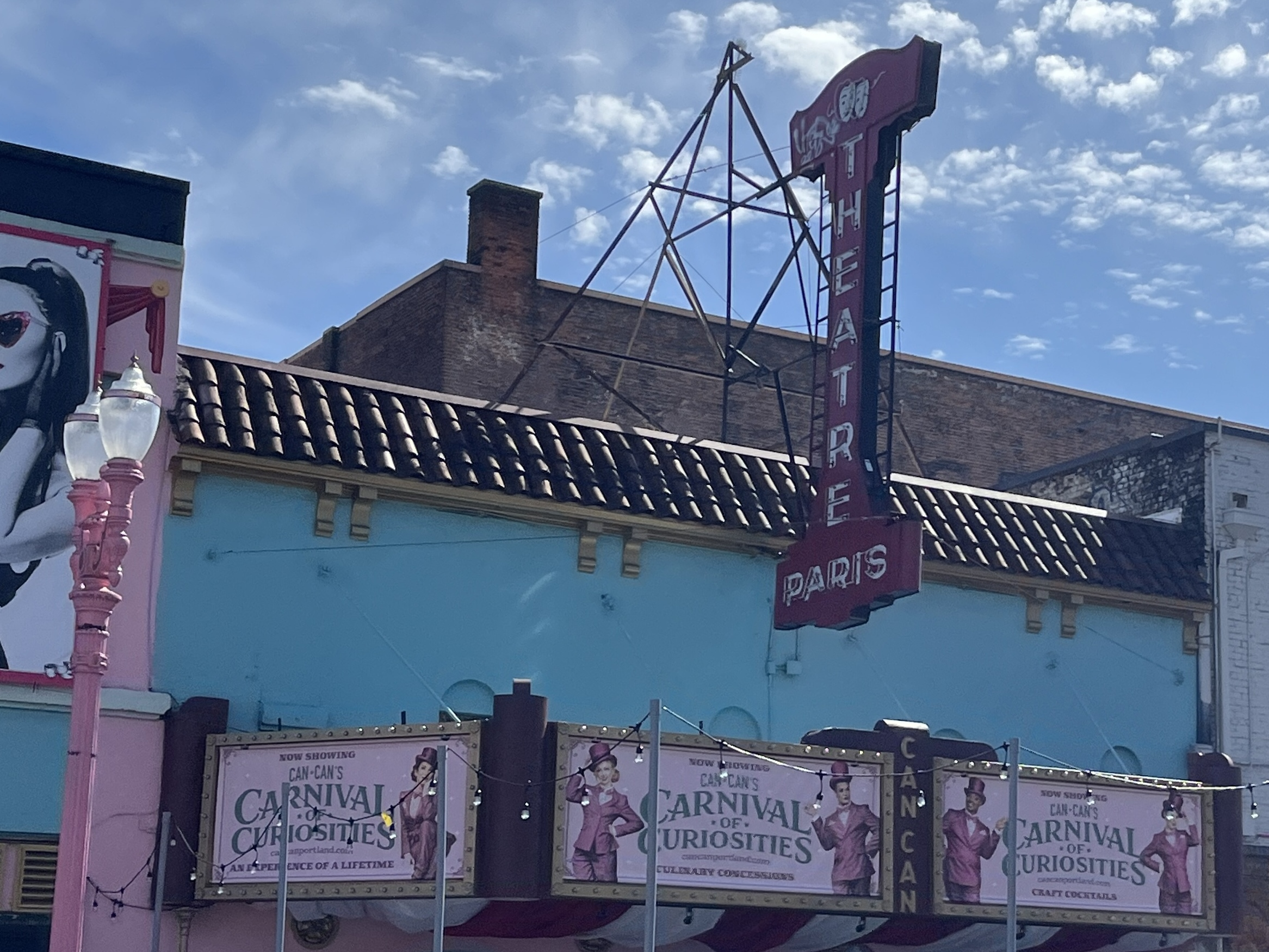
- The theater's exterior in 2026

- Location in Portland Location in Oregon Location in United States
- Former names: Third Avenue Theatre
- Address: 6 Southwest Third Avenue; Portland, Oregon; U.S.
- Coordinates: 45.52288°N 122.67320°W
- Owner: Can Can Productions
- Type: Theatre

Construction
- Opened: 1890

Paris Theatre, formerly Third Avenue Theatre and also known as Paris Theater or Ray's Paris Theatre, is a historic building in Portland, Oregon, United States. Located in the southwest part of the Old Town Chinatown neighborhood, the theatre was constructed in 1890 and opened as a burlesque house. It was later converted to a cinema, then a club and music venue, before serving as an adult movie theater until 2016. The building was a live venue and nightclub until it closed in October 2019. Currently, owned by Seattle-based Can Can Productions, Can Can's Paris Theatre hosts cabaret shows with burlesque and can-can.

== History ==
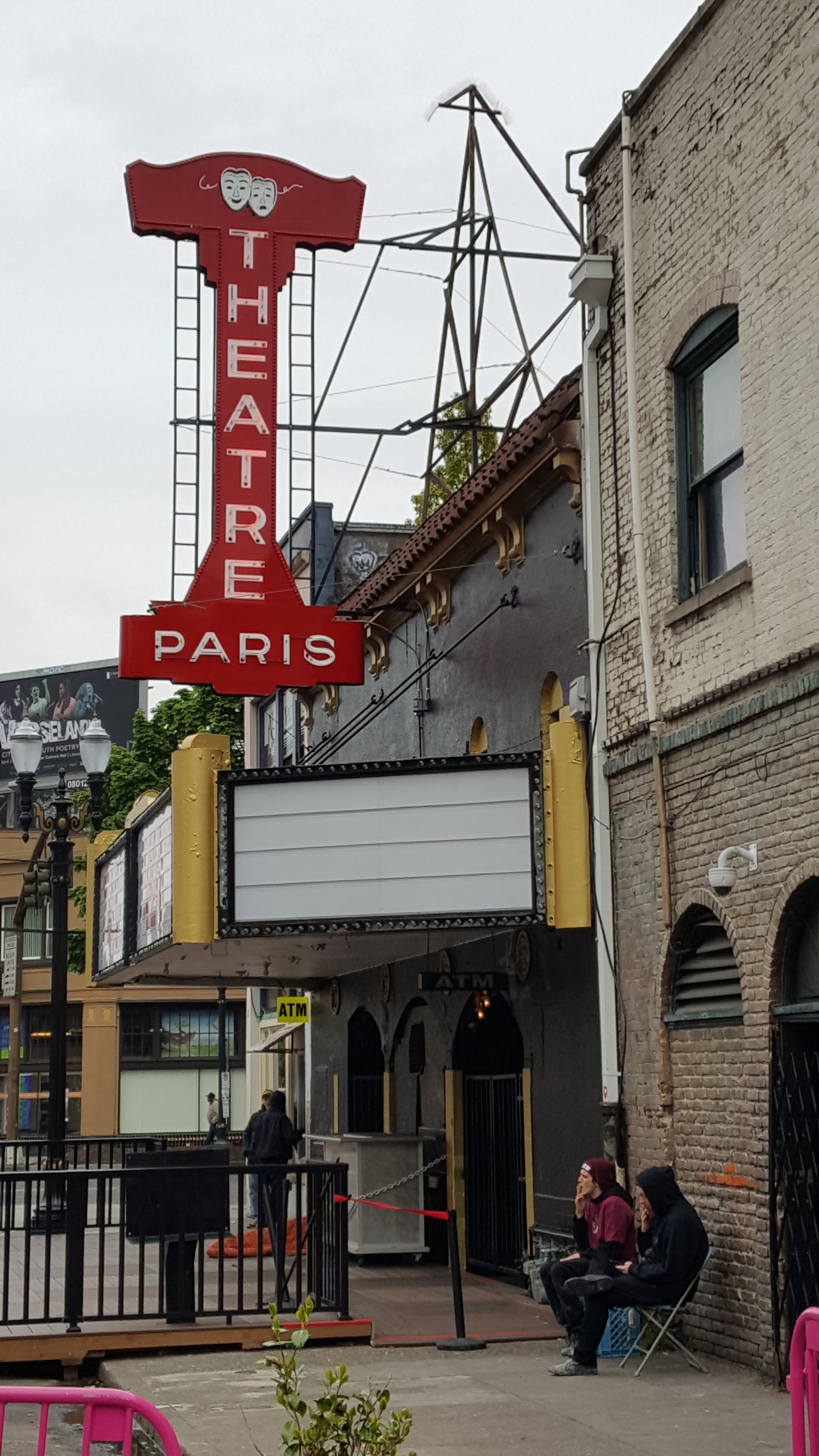
The venue's exterior in 2017

Paris Theatre, located at 6 Southwest Third Avenue at the intersection of Third and West Burnside Street in downtown Portland's Old Town Chinatown neighborhood, operates as a venue and nightclub. The building was completed in 1890 and opened as a burlesque house under the name Third Avenue Theatre.

The venue was later renamed Paris Theatre and converted to a movie cinema. It was listed in Film Daily from at least 1941 to 1950. The cinema screened the 1972 pornographic film Deep Throat for four years.

By 2003, the building served as a nightclub and music venue.

=== Adult movie theater (2007 to 2016) ===
In 2007, Ray Billings, owner of Jefferson Theatre, closed that venue and relocated his adult movie theater operation to the Paris.

Cinema Treasures said the building's exterior featured a red marquee with "Theatre" written vertically and "Paris" appearing horizontally across the bottom. An additional four-panel marquee was displayed above the front entrance. The theater screened heterosexual adult films on one large screen and gay pornography on a smaller screen. It featured a stage where guests could engage in sexual activities in front of a crowd, along with a "perky exam table" and a "voyeuristic bedroom". The venue was open 24 hours to patrons age 18 or older; as of 2007, entry cost $8.

In 2007, Willamette Week included the Paris in its list of Portland sites "Where Ghosts Wouldn't Be Caught Dead". The paper said of the venue, "Unfortunately, the Paris Theater ... hosts a bunch of winos, users and sleazy old guys the same age as your dad (or granddad), with their pants around their ankles and greasy cum rags in hand. A deformed zombie may be slightly more grotesque, but at least he won't flash you." In 2013, the same publication provided the following description of the theater and its clientele:

Despite the many couples offerings, a recent visit finds a smattering of middle-aged men watching a massive projection of tattooed teenage girls being sloppily choked and slapped in the face. The men in the seats have their pants on and look nervous. The men standing in the aisles do not have their pants on, and look very comfortable. As you enter, all faces—translucent in the pale pink flicker of the theater—look away from the interlocking figures on the screen and gaze hopefully, instead, on you. Perhaps you will be something new. Perhaps you will be interesting.

In 2016, Willamette Week referred to the Paris as "an adult movie theater, sex club and safe space for public masturbators", and a "shining beacon to furtive men hiding their faces from the Voodoo Doughnut line".

=== Live venue and nightclub (2016 to 2019) ===
The Paris was an adult movie theater until 2016, when new owners Chris Lenahan and Brad McCray converted the space into a live venue and nightclub. Their plan is to host weekend dance parties and return the venue to its old appearance, which includes front exterior improvements and returning the marquee. As of June 2016, the gay theater and dungeons were removed to open up the space, and a new bar was under construction. The projection room was being converted to a sound booth and seating was put into storage. The venue closed in October 2019.

=== Can Can's Paris Theatre ===
In 2019, Chris Pink (and other co-owners of Seattle-based Can Can Productions) began negotiating a purchase of a theater. The building's roof collapsed at this time, then the arrival of the COVID-19 pandemic stalled movement on the deal. Pink purchased and began renovating the theater in 2021-2022. Can Can Productions produces cabaret shows with burlesque and can-can and Can Can's Paris Theatre has a capacity of approximately 100 to 140 people. Can Can's Paris Theatre opened in November 21, 2025. The first show was an adaptation of The Nutcracker called Twas the Night Before Nutcracker. The theatre has been credited for an increase in the number of diners at nearby Dan and Louis Oyster Bar.

== See also ==
- American burlesque
- Culture of Portland, Oregon
