= Duck confit =

French duck dish

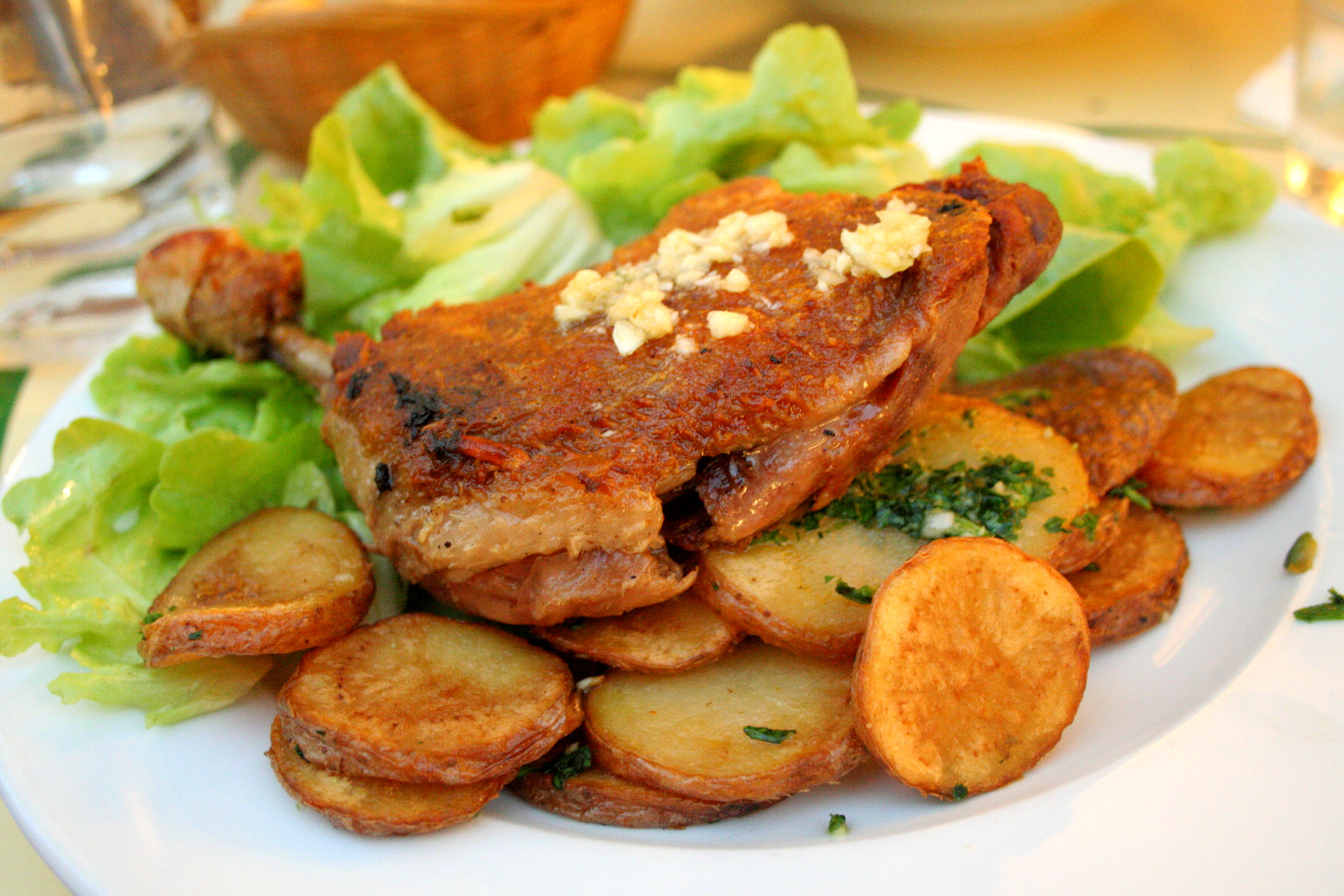
Confit de canard from Café du Marché, in Paris

Duck confit (French: confit de canard [kɔ̃.fi d(ə) ka.naʁ]) is a French dish made with whole duck. In Gascony, according to the families perpetuating the tradition, all of the duck is used to produce the dish. Each part can have a specific destination in traditional cooking, the neck being used for example in an invigorating soup, the garbure. Duck confit is also a traditional ingredient in many versions of cassoulet.

== Traditional preparation ==
While it is made across France, it is seen as a specialty of Gascony. The confit is prepared in a centuries-old process of preservation that consists of salt curing a piece of meat (generally goose, duck, or pork) and then cooking it in its fat.

The meat is rubbed with salt (which acts as a preservative), garlic, and sometimes herbs such as thyme, covered, and refrigerated for up to 36 hours, then slowly poached , generally for four to ten hours, until at least cooked or meltingly tender.

The cooked meat can be transferred to a container and completely submerged in the fat. Skipping the salt curing stage greatly reduces the shelf life. Confit is also sold in cans, which can be kept for several years. The flavourful fat from the confit may also be used in many other ways, as a frying medium for sautéed vegetables (e.g., green beans and garlic, wild or cultivated mushrooms), savory toasts, scrambled eggs or omelettes, and as an addition to shortcrust pastry for tarts and quiches.

A classic finishing recipe is to fry or grill the legs in some of the fat until they are well-browned and crisp, and use more of the fat to roast potatoes and garlic as an accompaniment. The potatoes roasted in duck fat to accompany the crisped-up confit are called pommes de terre à la sarladaise.

== See also ==
- List of duck dishes
