= Pacific Northwest cuisine =

Traditional cuisine of the Pacific Northwest

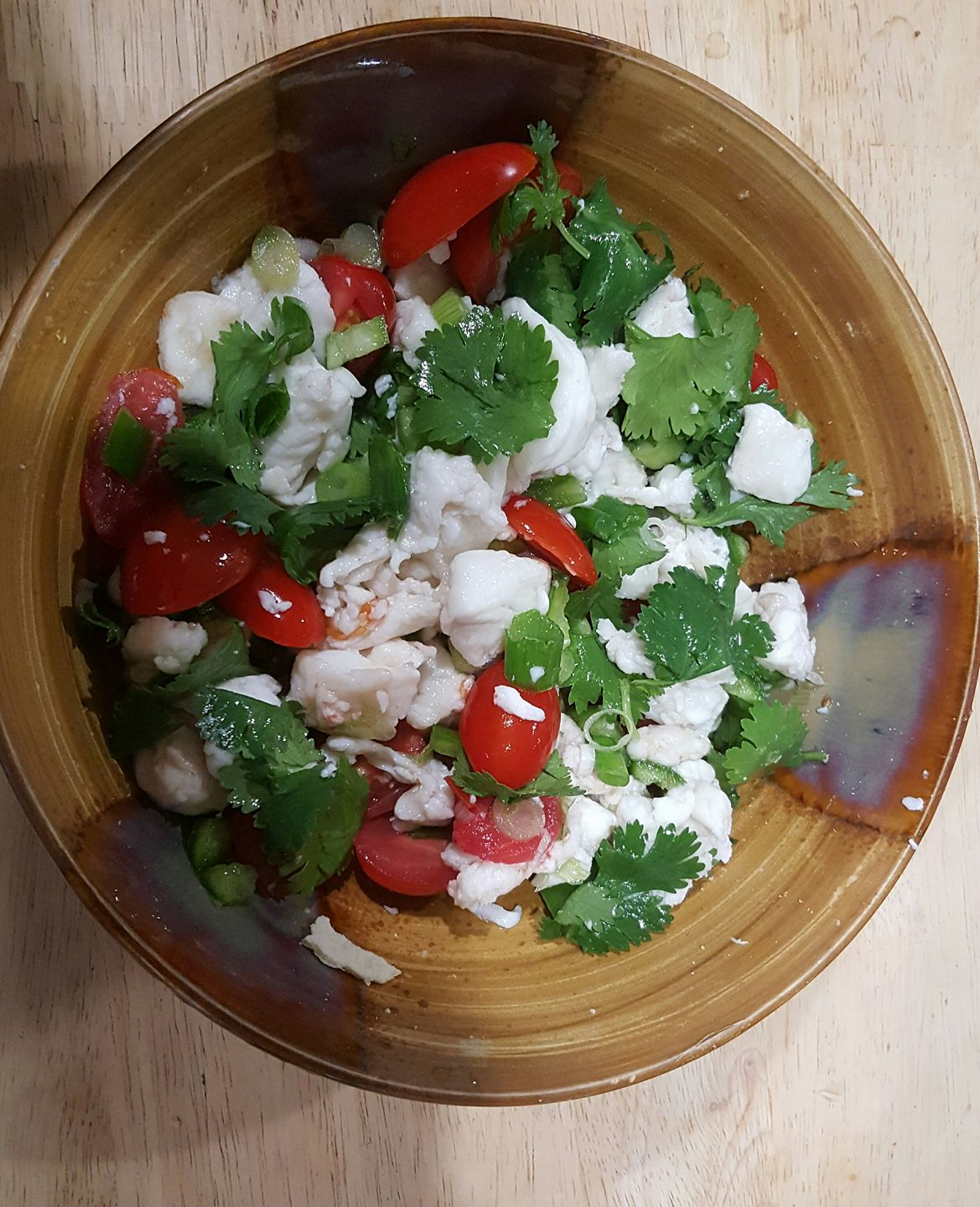
Alaskan ceviche made with Pacific halibut, serrano peppers, cilantro and tomato

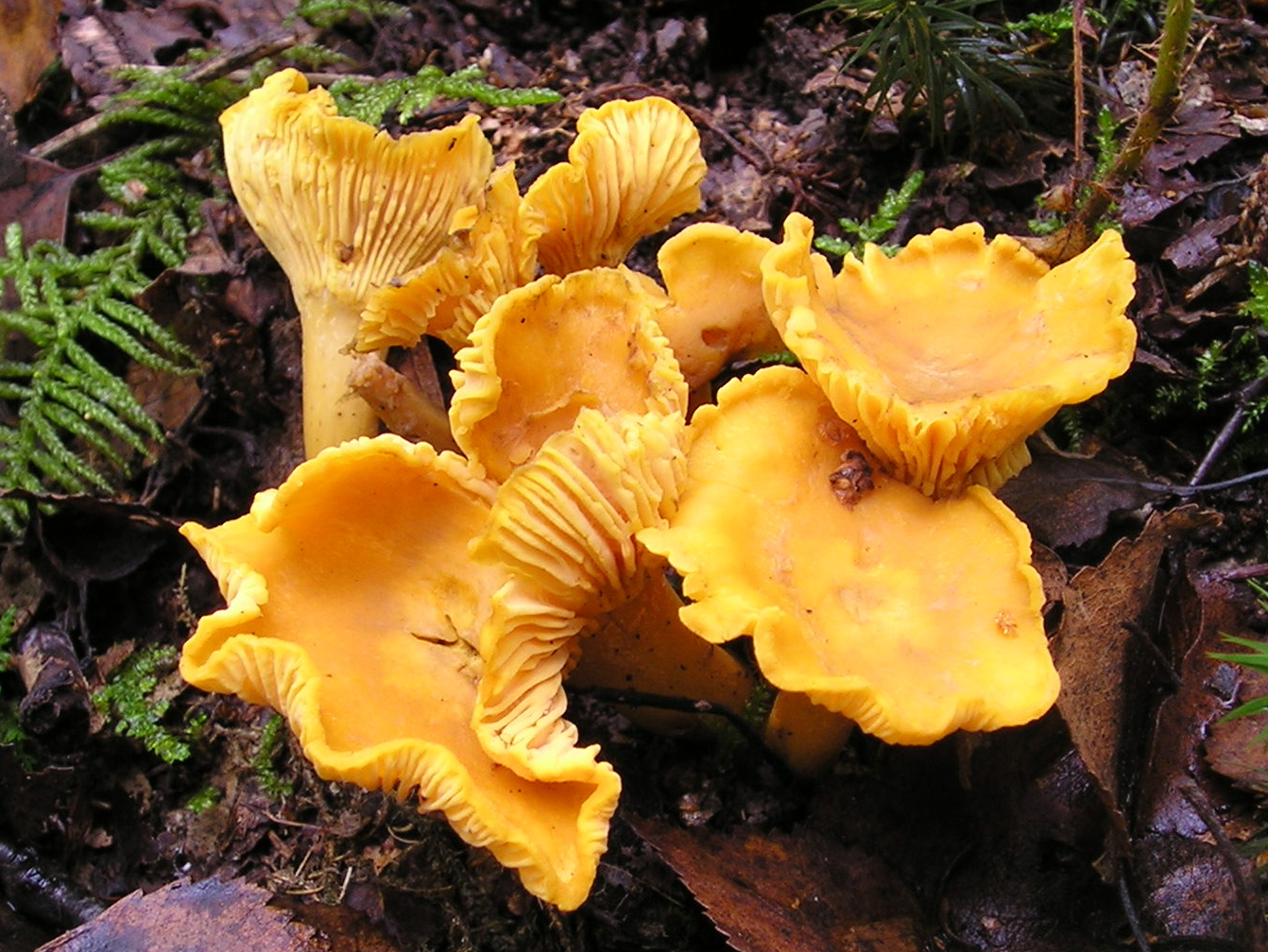
Chanterelle mushrooms

Pacific Northwest cuisine is a North American cuisine that is found in the Pacific Northwest, i.e. the states of Oregon, Washington, Idaho and Alaska, as well as the province of British Columbia and the southern portion of the territory of Yukon, reflecting the ethnic makeup of the region, with noticeable influence from Asian and Native American traditions. Influences from Southern cuisine brought by African Americans, as well as Mexican-American cuisine as Latinos migrate north from California, can be seen as well.

Seattle's Pike Place Market is notable regarding this culinary style, along with Portland and Vancouver. Former food critic of The New York Times Frank Bruni wrote of Seattle in June 2011, "I'm hard-pressed to think of another corner or patch of the United States where the locavore sensibilities of the moment are on such florid (and often sweetly funny) display, or where they pay richer dividends, at least if you're a lover of fish."

== Foods and dishes ==
Common ingredients include salmon, shellfish, and other fresh seafood, game meats such as moose, elk, or caribou, wild mushrooms, berries, small fruits, potatoes, kale, and wild plants such as fiddlehead ferns and even young pushki. Smoking fish or grilling seafood on cedar planks are techniques often used in this cuisine. Since the 1980s, Northwest cuisine has begun to emphasize the use of locally produced craft beer and wine.

There is generally an emphasis on fresh ingredients, simply prepared. Unlike other cuisine styles, there are various recipes for each dish with none being considered more or less correct than the others. This has led some food writers to question whether it truly is a "cuisine" in the traditional sense of the word.

Many food carts and food trucks in the Northwest specialize in fusion cuisine, such as bulgogi burritos, deep-fried sushi rolls, Korean tacos and "Japanese-style" hot dogs. Other foods found in Seattle with a heavy Asian influence include a unique style of teriyaki, along with a sushi roll with salmon and cream cheese (the Seattle roll). Food carts also spawned the Seattle Dog, a hot dog with cream cheese.

== See also ==
- Tlingit cuisine, the food of the Tlingit people, an indigenous people from Alaska, British Columbia, and the Yukon
- Food carts in Portland, Oregon
- List of restaurants in Vancouver
- List of restaurants in Seattle
- List of restaurants in Portland, Oregon
