= Salt Shack on the Bay =

Restaurant in Tampa, Florida, U.S.

- Interactive map of Salt Shack on the Bay

Restaurant information
- Location: 5415 West Tyson Avenue, Tampa, Florida, 33611, United States
- Coordinates: 27°53′13″N 82°32′28″W
- Website: salt-shack.com

Salt Shack on the Bay is a seafood restaurant in Tampa, Florida. Established in July 2019, the business was included in The New York Times's 2023 list of the 50 best restaurants in the United States.

== See also ==
- List of seafood restaurants
