= Local Tide =

Seafood restaurant in Seattle, Washington, U.S.

- Interactive map of Local Tide

Restaurant information
- Food type: Seafood
- Location: 401 North 36th Street, Seattle, King, Washington, 98103, United States
- Coordinates: 47.6520°N 122.3539°W
- Website: localtide.com

Local Tide is a seafood restaurant in Seattle, in the U.S. state of Washington.

== Description ==
Local Tide is a seafood restaurant operating from Fremont's Cedar Speedster Building on North 36th Street. The menu includes sandwiches with crab, salmon, rockfish, fried fish, beef and pork, and vegetables.

== History ==
Local Tide began as a series of pop-ups. The business opened in a brick and mortar space in 2020.

== Reception ==
In 2023, Local Tide was included in The New York Times' list of Seattle's 25 best restaurants, as well as Eater Seattle's overview of the city's "essential" seafood restaurants.

== See also ==
- List of seafood restaurants
