= Palisade (restaurant) =

Restaurant in Seattle, Washington, U.S.

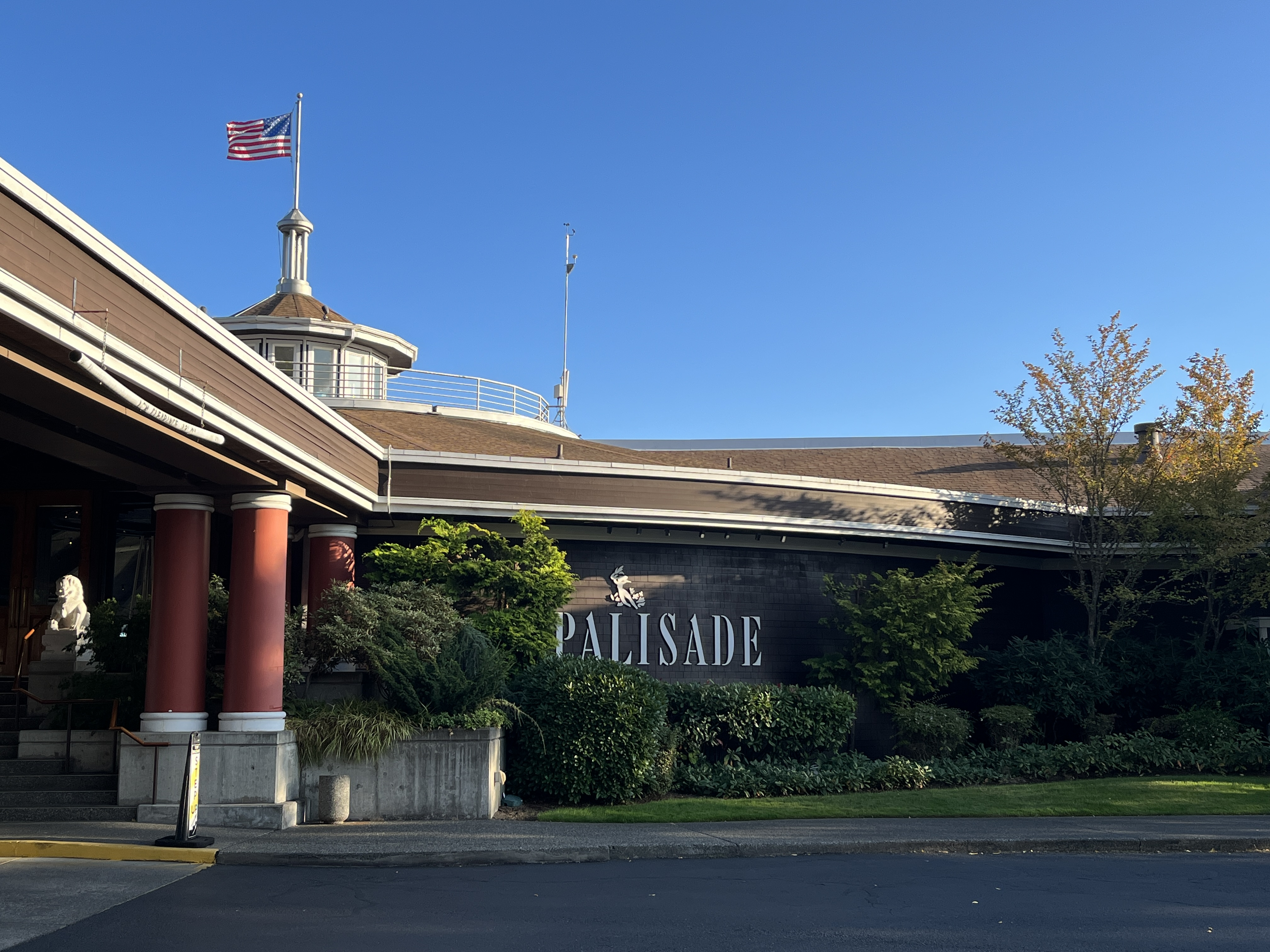
- The restaurant's exterior, 2022
- Interactive map of Palisade

Restaurant information
- Food type: Seafood
- Location: 2601 West Marina Place, Seattle, Washington, 98199, United States
- Coordinates: 47°37′49″N 122°23′29″W
- Website: palisaderestaurant.com

Palisade Restaurant, or simply Palisade, is a seafood restaurant in Seattle, in the U.S. state of Washington.

== Description ==
The Seattle Metropolitan has said of the restaurant: "Sometimes it feels like every other table has someone proposing marriage or planning their Ride the Ducks tour, but this longstanding spot does boast one of Seattle's great views, the sweep of Elliott Bay and Puget Sound toward the Olympics. Inside, the whiff of grandeur only an indoor pond can provide. Food is safe and spendy (but hooray for free valet)."

According to Thrillist, "Palisade rocks a raw bar, a surf and turf-heavy menu", and sushi.

== History ==
The restaurant was operated Restaurants Unlimited and had a wine list with more than 600 wines as of 2011.

In 2012, the business unveiled a $200,000 renovation and new menu by executive chef Ryan O'Brien.

Houston-based restaurant company Landry's acquired Palisade in 2019.

== Reception ==
Jason Price included the restaurant in Eater Seattle's 2015 list of the city's "9 Best Spots for Prime Rib".

== See also ==
- List of seafood restaurants
