= Melange =

Melange, from the French, meaning "mixture" or "medley", may refer to:

- Melange (Dune), or spice, a fictional psychoactive substance in Frank Herbert's Dune universe
- Wiener Melange ("Viennese blend"), a specialty coffee originating in Vienna, similar to a cappuccino
- Mélange (rocket fuel component)
- Mélange, a type of rock with block-in-matrix structure containing diverse blocks of rocks
- Melange (yarn), yarns made with mixed fibers dyed before yarn spinning
- Chez Melange, American restaurant

== See also ==
- Melanger
