= BluWater Bistro =

Restaurant in Seattle, Washington, U.S.

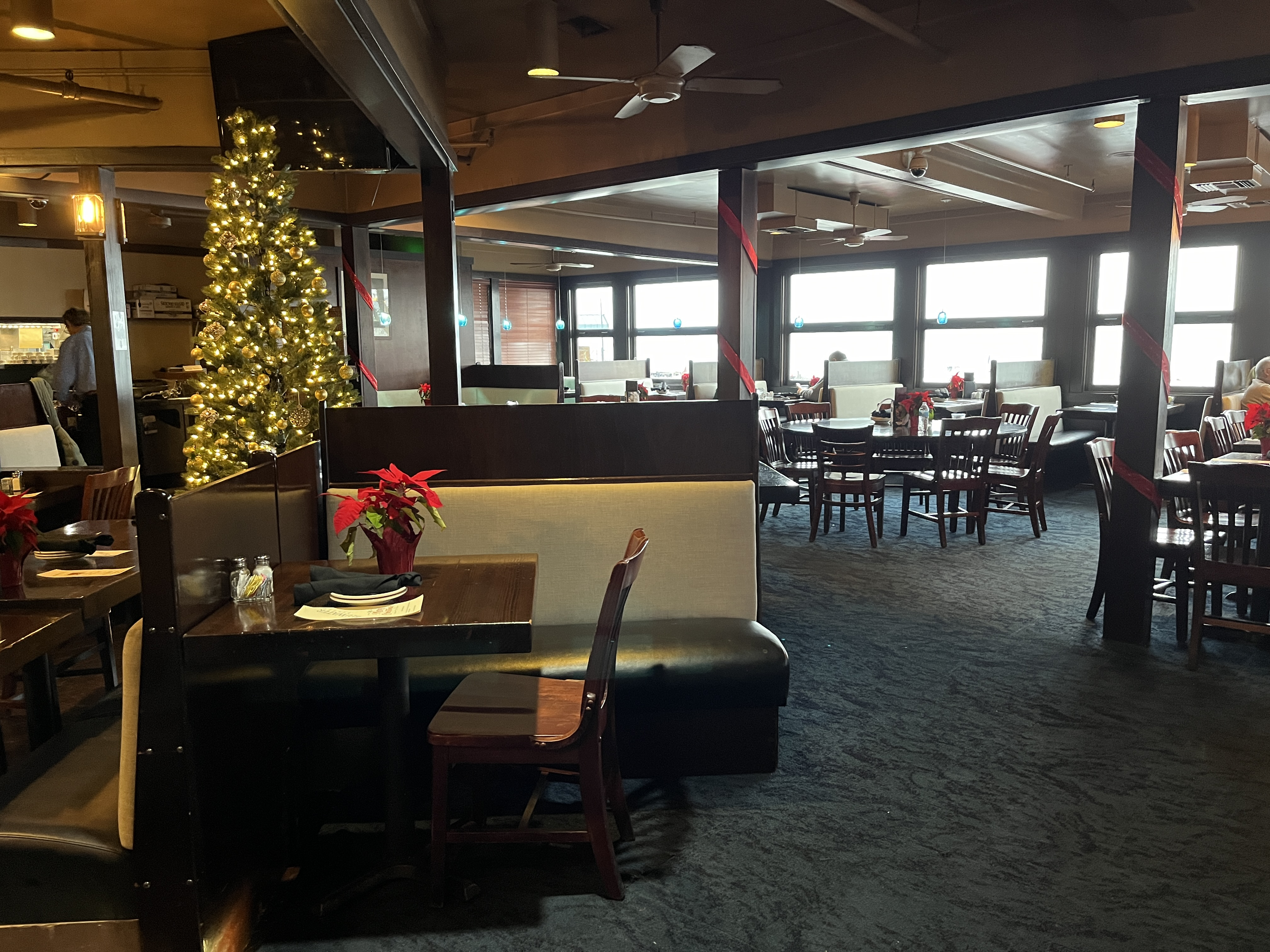
- Interior of the restaurant in Seattle's Leschi neighborhood, 2023
- Interactive map of BluWater Bistro

Restaurant information
- Established: 1997
- Owners: Bart Evan; Dan Anderson
- Food type: American; New American; seafood
- Location: 102 Lakeside Avenue, Seattle, King, Seattle, 98112, United States
- Coordinates: 47.6019°N 122.2849°W

BluWater Bistro is a restaurant in Seattle's Leschi neighborhood, in the U.S. state of Washington. The restaurant is the only one remaining from a small chain with locations in the city's Green Lake and South Lake Union neighborhoods, and in Kirkland.

== Description ==
BluWater Bistro is a seafood restaurant in Seattle's Leschi neighborhood, the last remaining location of a small chain in the metropolitan area. The approximately 5,200-square-foot restaurant is sometimes referred to as BluWater Bistro Leschi. The interior has mahogany booths and panels. BluWater Bistro has also operated in Green Lake, and in Kirkland. The Green Lake restaurant had a 20-seat bar and a sidewalk patio off Green Lake Drive North.

=== Menu ===
The American / New American menu has included chipotle-honey barbecue ribs, macaroni and cheese with Dungeness crab, crab rangoons, mahi-mahi tacos, pasta, roasted chicken, pork chops, New York steak with blue cheese, and other "comfort foods".

For Mother's Day, the restaurant has served Dungeness crab quiche with breakfast potatoes, a scone, and fruit, as well as mimosas. During the COVID-19 pandemic, the restaurant's take-out and delivery options for Mother's Day included bone-in prime rib, whole roasted organic chicken, Brussels sprouts, potatoes, key lime pie, and bottles of pinot noir.

For Thanksgiving, the restaurant has served turkey, prime rib or holiday ham, cranberry-walnut salad or squash soup, wild greens, and pumpkin pie. Dine-in and take-out options for Christmas have included turkey, prime rib, ham, and pumpkin pie.

== History ==
Co-owners Bart Evans and Dan Anderson opened the original restaurant on Lake Union in 1997. Peter Levine was the chef, as of 2002.

The Green Lake location opened in 2002. The Leschi restaurant opened in 2004, replacing Leschi Lake Cafe. Prior to opening the restaurant underwent a renovation and received exterior repairs including a new roof. The Green Lake location closed in 2015.

== Reception ==
The Not for Tourists Guide to Seattle has said BluWater offers "pricey but perfect seafood and meat for appeasing the carnivore in your life". Seattle Metropolitan's 2017 list of 23 restaurants with "great water views" says: "Depending on who you ask, the interior is either comfortably worn, or has seen better days. But there are surprisingly few restaurants along Lake Washington's western shore, and the water views are lovely." BluWater has won in the Best Cocktails category of Seattle Weekly's readers' poll.

== See also ==
- List of New American restaurants
- List of restaurant chains in the United States
- List of seafood restaurants
