= Angler (San Francisco restaurant) =

Seafood restaurant in San Francisco, California, U.S.

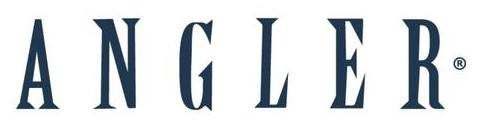

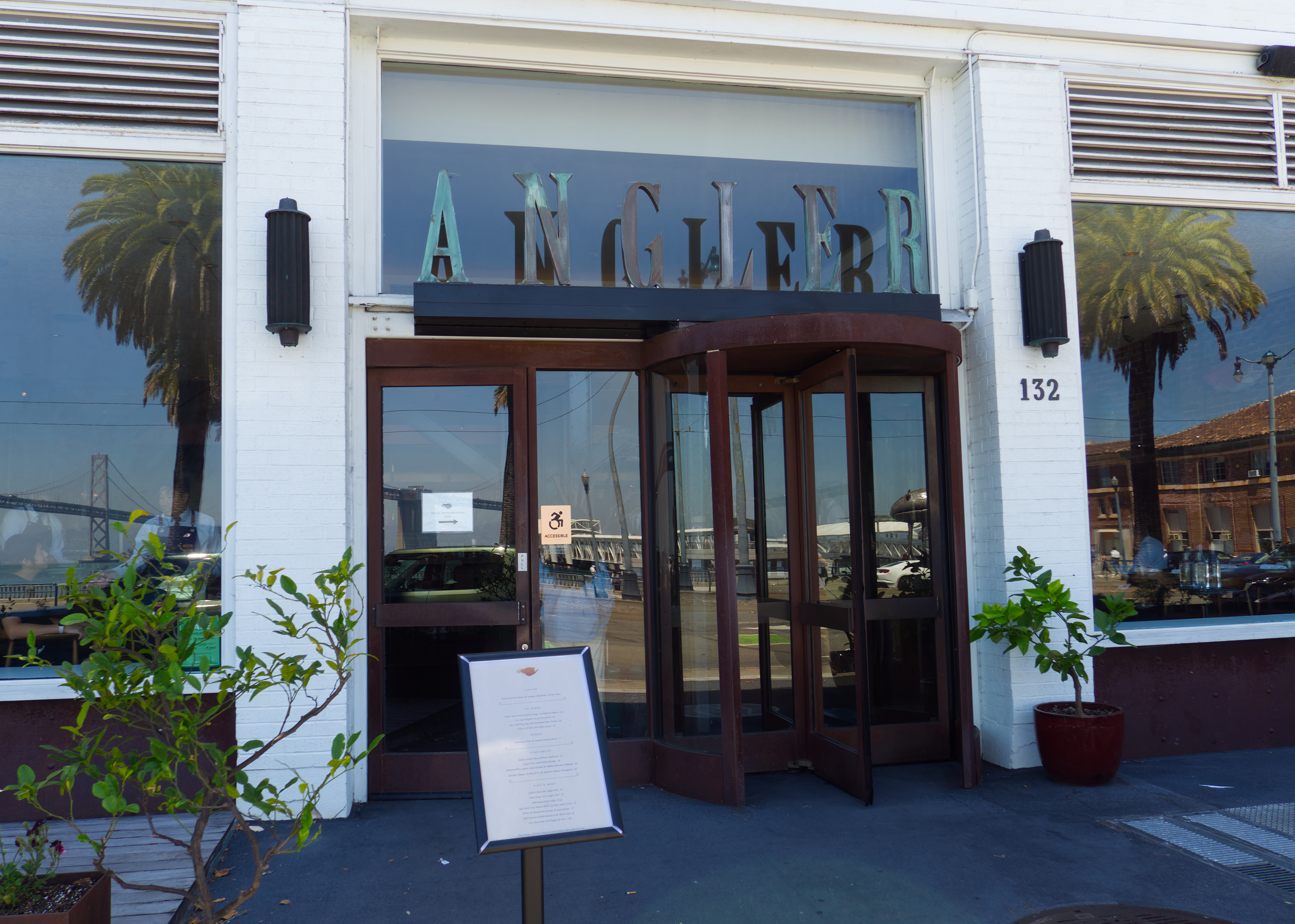
- Angler in July 2026
- Interactive map of Angler

Restaurant information
- Established: September 2018
- Owner: Joshua Skenes
- Chef: Joshua Skenes
- Food type: Seafood
- Rating: (Michelin Guide)
- Location: 132 The Embarcadero, San Francisco, California, 94105, United States
- Coordinates: 37°47′35″N 122°23′32″W
- Website: anglerrestaurants.com

Angler is a seafood restaurant in San Francisco, in the U.S. state of California. Founder Joshua Skenes opened Angler in September 2018. Praised for its food and drinks, the restaurant received a Michelin star.

== Description ==
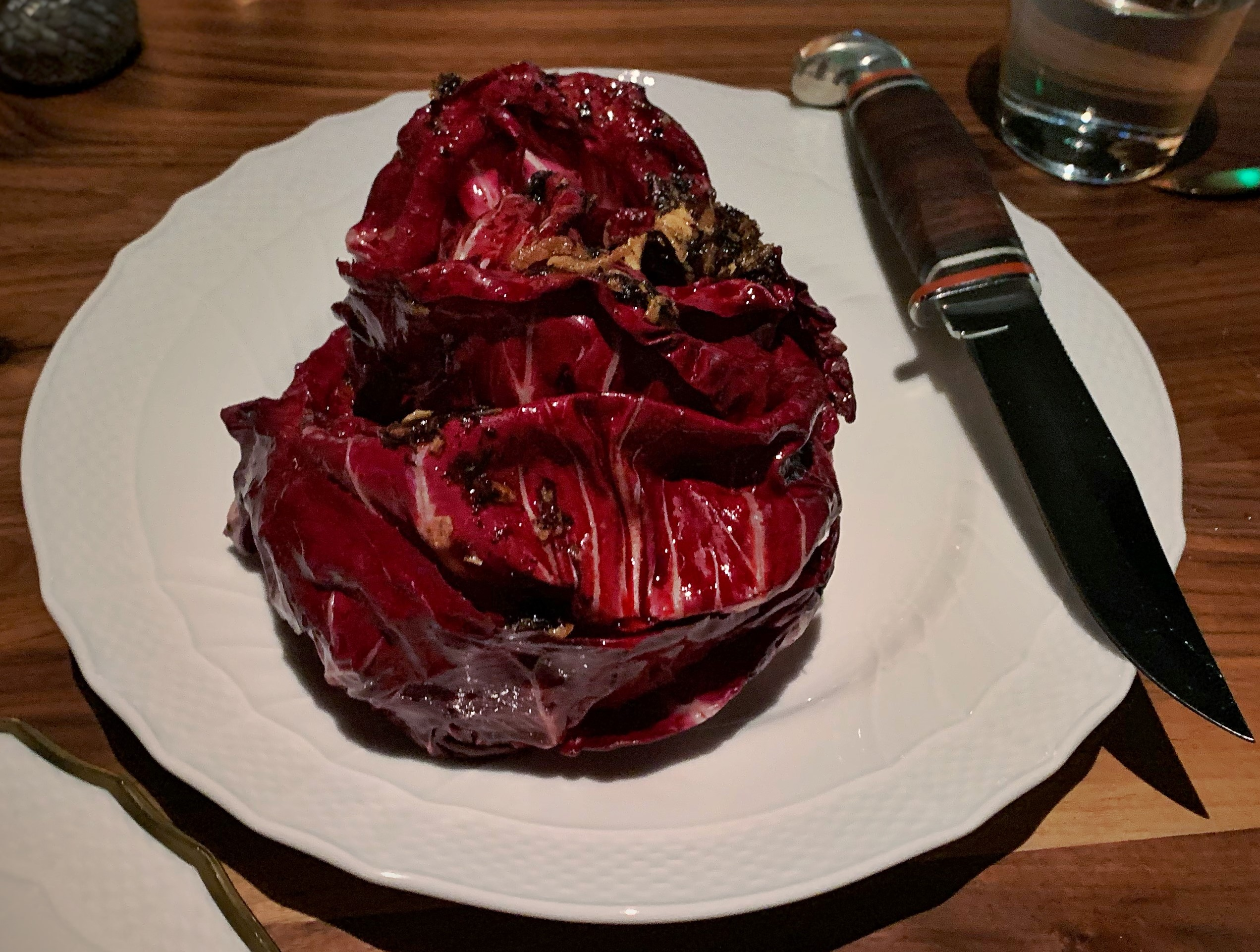
Radicchio with XO sauce

The building contains dark wood and brick walls, with a view overlooking the Bay Bridge. Being "microclimate-oriented" and "sealife-focused", Angler's menu includes a radicchio with XO sauce made from radicchio leaves, a tuna with tomato jam, fried blowfish tails, potatoes with a light cheese sauce, and a sundae with caramel, smoked salt, and cocoa; drinks include wine and cocktails, such as the Don Lockwood, consisting of scotch, maple, and bourbon, and the Cutloose, consisting of gin, passionfruit, and orange.

== History ==
Angler was founded in September 2018 by Joshua Skenes, who was a founder and chef at the two-Michelin star restaurant Saison.

== Reception ==
In 2018, Angler was featured on Esquire's list of the best restaurants. Angler has received a Michelin star, meaning "high-quality cooking, worth a stop".

Jenna Scatena of Condé Nast Traveler magazine stated that the restaurant served "some of the best modern seafood" in the city, additionally praising the wine menu and "attentive" staff. Rating the restaurant an 8.5, The Infatuation's Will Kamensky highlighted several dishes and drinks, while Eater described that Angler's fruit "tastes more like fruit than ever before". Former food critic Michael Bauer compared the restaurant to "Saison on steroids".

== See also ==
- List of Michelin-starred restaurants in California
- List of seafood restaurants
