= Athenian Seafood Restaurant and Bar =

Restaurant in Seattle, Washington, U.S.

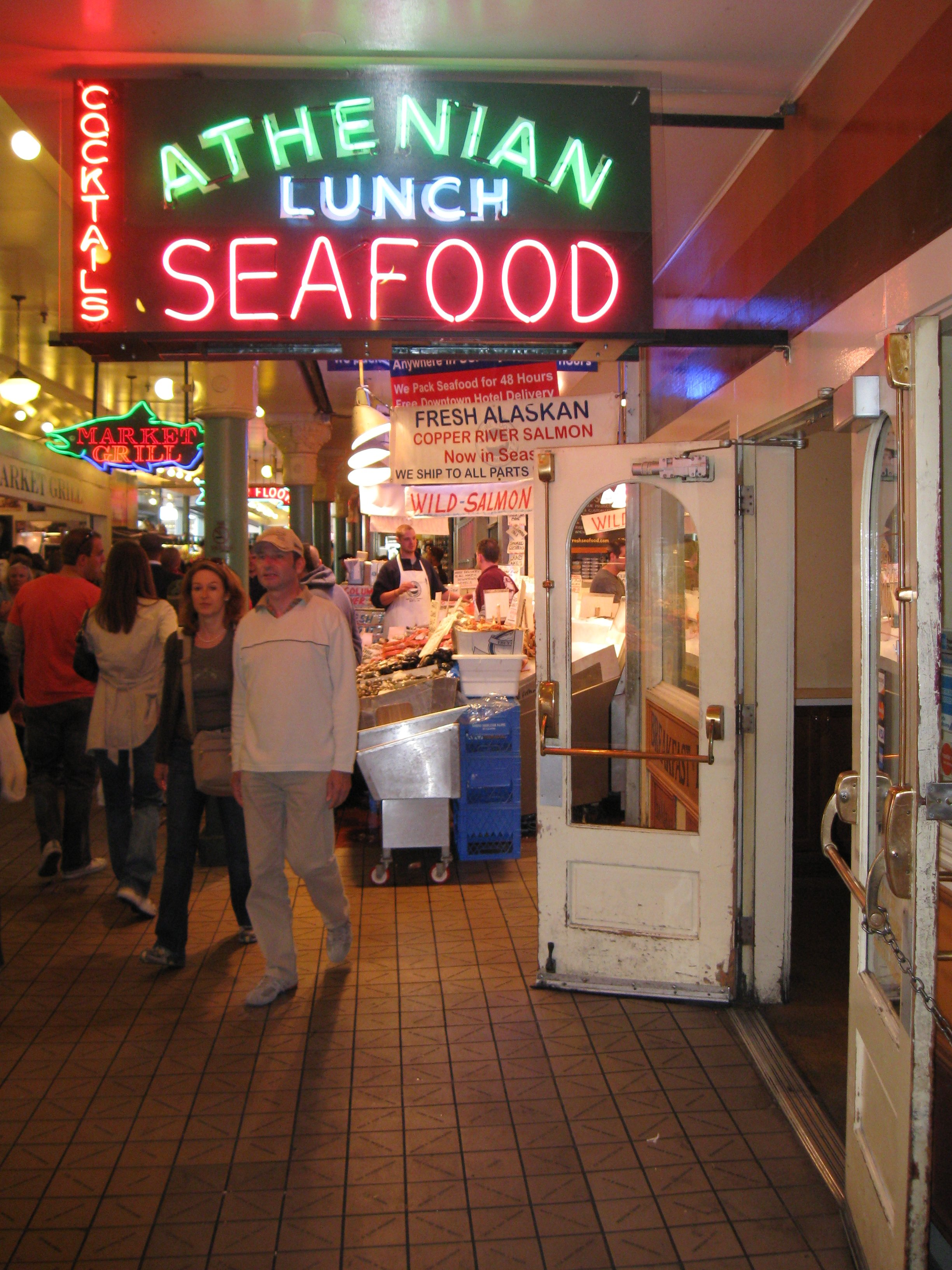
- Entrance in 2008
- Interactive map of Athenian Seafood Restaurant and Bar

Restaurant information
- Location: 1517 Pike Place, Seattle, Washington, 98101, United States
- Coordinates: 47°36′31.8″N 122°20′28.2″W

Athenian Seafood Restaurant and Bar, or simply The Athenian, is a seafood restaurant in Seattle's Pike Place Market, in the U.S. state of Washington. The business was established in 1909, and became one of Seattle's first to acquire a beer license in 1933. The Athenian appeared in Sleepless in Seattle. In addition to seafood, the menu has included burgers and salads.

== See also ==
- List of restaurants in Pike Place Market
- List of seafood restaurants
