= White Swan Public House =

Seafood restaurant in Seattle, Washington, U.S.

- Interactive map of White Swan Public House

Restaurant information
- Location: 1001 Fairview Avenue North, Seattle, Washington, 98109, United States
- Coordinates: 47°37′44.8″N 122°19′54.5″W

White Swan Public House (WSPH) is a seafood restaurant in Seattle, in the U.S. state of Washington.

== Description ==
The Seattle Metropolitan describes WSPH as an American/New American gastropub which "combines one of the city’s epic waterside patios with some of the best elements of its restaurant group peers, treating seafood with the same humorous verve Radiator Whiskey applies to meat. Service can get overwhelmed on sunny days, but show me another place where you can chase beautiful raw oysters with chowder-inspired poutine." The menu has included fish, clams, oysters, and scallops, as well as fried maitake mushrooms, oven-roasted octopus, fried Brussels sprouts, and bone marrow on toast. The restaurant has also served fish and chips.

== History ==
The restaurant is owned by Dan Bugge, who also owns Matt's in the Market and Radiator Whiskey.

He is stated that the idea for both establishments originated from the more than 10 years he worked at Pike Place Market.

== Reception ==
Megan Hill, Gabe Guarente, and Jade Yamazaki Stewart included WSPH in Eater Seattle's 2022 overview of "Where to Get Outstanding Oysters in Seattle". Writers for the website also included the restaurant in a 2022 list of "15 Lively Seattle Restaurants for Big Group Dinners".

== See also ==
- List of New American restaurants
- List of seafood restaurants
- South Lake Union, Seattle
