= Pearl of the Dane =

Former restaurant in Cheshire, England

Coordinates: 53.16647866°N 2.21224785°W

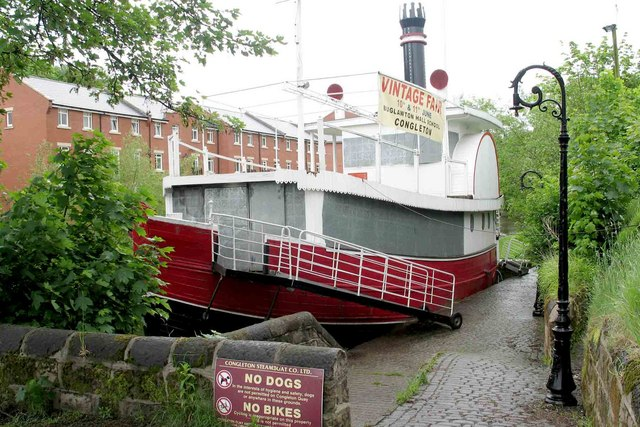
- Pearl of the Dane in 2006
- Interactive map of Pearl of the Dane

Restaurant information
- Established: December 1997
- Closed: Autumn 1999
- Previous owner: Joe Terry
- Food type: Seafood
- Location: Congleton, Cheshire, United Kingdom
- Seating capacity: 80

Pearl of the Dane was a seafood restaurant located in Congleton, Cheshire.

== History ==
The establishment originated from the Danish fishing trawler Limanda, which was built in 1974. In 1996, the Limanda was purchased by Joe Terry, a businessman from Congleton, while it was docked in Anglesey. The hull of the ship was transported to Congleton in September 1996; however, due to its size, only the hull was moved. A custom dry dock was constructed in Congleton to accommodate the hull.

To complement its seafood theme, the surrounding structure was designed to mimic a 1920s steamboat. Materials for the refurbishment were sourced from scrapyards in Holland and Denmark. The restaurant, also known as the Congleton Steamboat, opened in December 1997 and initially enjoyed success.

Despite its early success, Pearl of the Dane struggled with declining trade and closed in the autumn of 1999. The site has since faced vandalism and, in its current state, is regarded by locals as an "eyesore." There have been various proposals to reopen the restaurant, but none have materialized.

In early 2025 Pearl of the Dane was put up for sale.

In May 2026 the new owners of the Pearl of The Dane began work to refurbish the former restaurant.
