= Chez Melange =

- Chez Melange
- Interactive map of Chez Melange

Restaurant information
- Established: 1982
- Closed: February 29, 2020
- Previous owners: Michael Franks, Robert Bell
- Chef: Robert Bell
- Food type: Seafood, gastropub
- Dress code: Casual
- Location: 1611 South Catalina Avenue, Hollywood Riviera, Redondo Beach, Los Angeles County, California, 90277, United States
- Reservations: Yes
- Other locations: No
- Website: chezmelange.com (Archived)

Chez Melange was an American seafood restaurant and gastropub located at 1611 South Catalina Avenue in Redondo Beach, California, which closed on February 29, 2020. It was opened in 1982 and owned and run by Michael Franks and co-owner and head chef Robert Bell.

== History ==
Chez Melange was originally located on Pacific Coast Highway and after the lease was up it moved to its new location in January 2009 on Catalina Avenue.

Chez Melange ran three restaurants at the same Redondo Beach, Catalina Avenue venue, Sea Change, a sea food themed restaurant, Bouzy, a gastropub and The Oyster Bar.

Robert Bell said when first meeting Michael Franks, "I remembered thinking, I don't want to work with this guy. I'm from Brooklyn, he's from London. He came from what I thought was an upscale upbringing, I was just off the line of being poor. He went through restaurant school, I barely made it through junior college. But we were both very driven, very passionate about what we were doing, and that's the only reason we got along."

Chez Melange closed permanently on February 29, 2020.

== Table Manners, Perfect Storm ==
In 2021 the Chez Melange location was reopened under different ownership as a new restaurant called Table Manners and was later renamed Perfect Storm. Perfect Storm permanently closed in the early 2020s.

== Montauk ==
It was announced in 2025 that a new fine dining restaurant, Montauk, would be opening at the former Chez Melange location.

African American entrepreneur Lavae McClinnahan had the original high-end restaurant concept of Montauk that was influenced by the hamlet of Montauk in the Hamptons.

BET quoted McClinnahan as saying, "Here in South Bay, there's no African Americans." Adding, "The community is asking for more. Everything has been kind of dumbed down, and people want better options."

== See also ==
- List of seafood restaurants
