= Weathervane Seafood Restaurants =

Seafood chain in Kittery, Maine and New Hampshire

Coordinates: 43°6′40.2″N 70°44′3.6″W

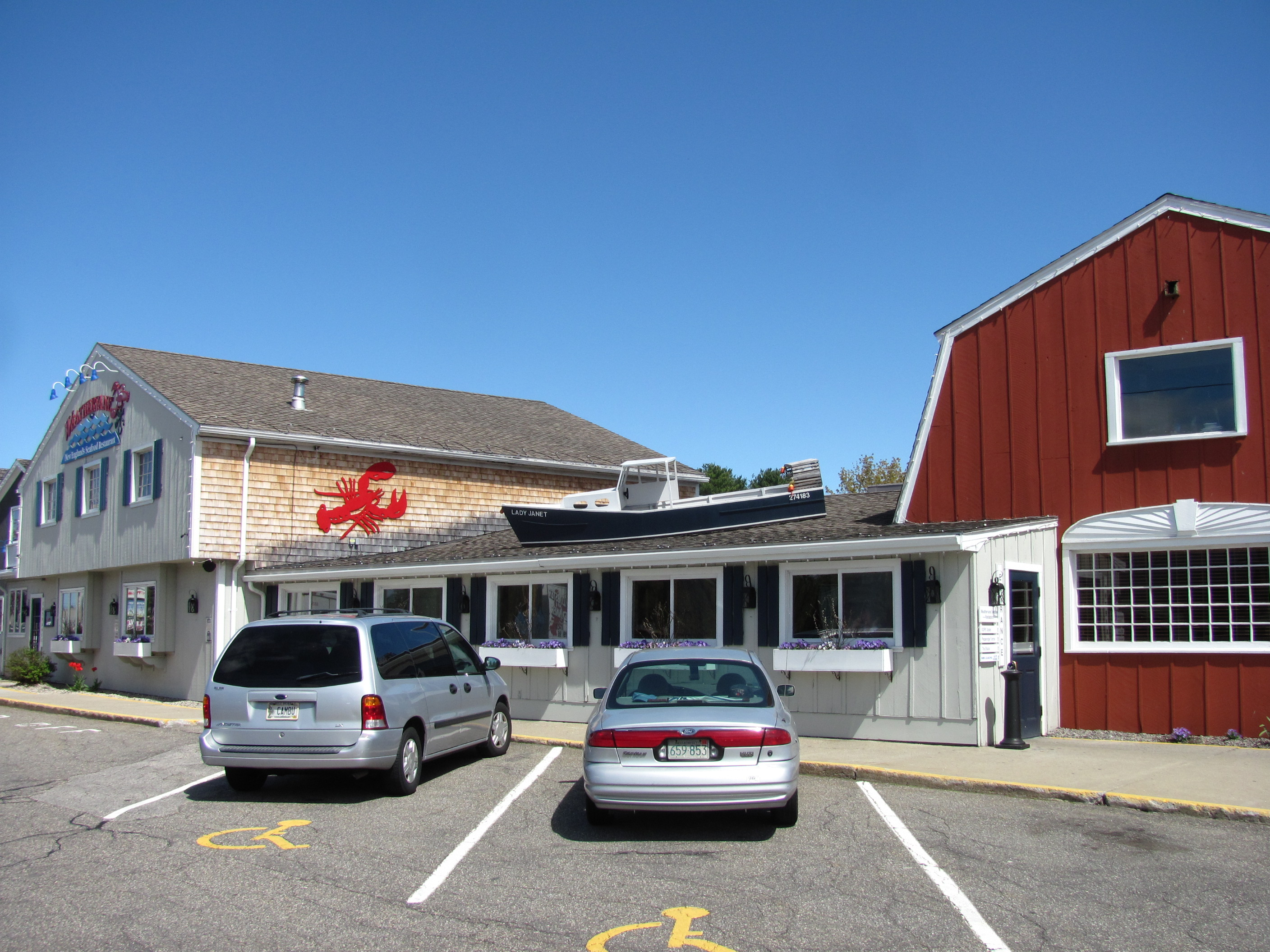
- Weathervane Restaurant in Kittery, Maine
- Type: Family business
- Industry: Restaurants
- Founded: 1969 in Kittery, Maine, United States
- Founders: Raymond and Bea Gagner
- Headquarters: Kittery, Maine, United States
- Number of locations: 5 restaurants (including one seasonal location)
- Areas served: Kittery, Maine; Dover, Chichester, West Lebanon, and Weirs Beach, New Hampshire
- Products: Seafood; soft drinks; alcoholic drinks
- Website: weathervaneseafoods.com

Weathervane Seafood Restaurants is a seafood chain in New England. It was founded in Kittery, Maine, in 1969 by Raymond and Bea Gagner. It is based in Kittery, Maine. The chain has five locations, with one in Kittery, Maine and four in New Hampshire; Dover, Chichester, West Lebanon, and a seasonal location on Weirs Beach in Laconia.

== See also ==
- List of seafood restaurants
