= Gladstones Malibu =

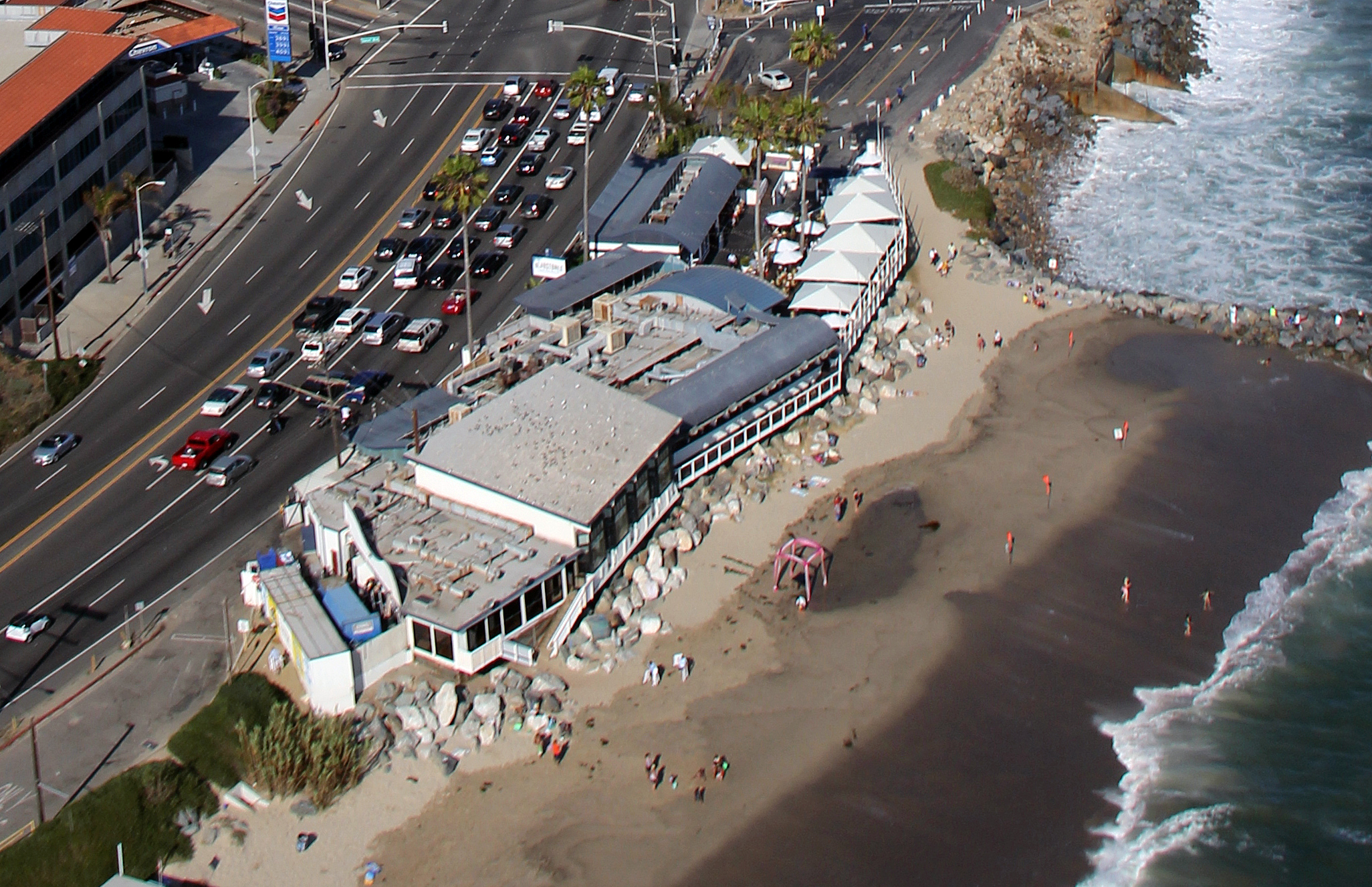
- Aerial photo of Gladstones
- Interactive map of Gladstones Malibu

Restaurant information
- Established: 1972; 54 years ago
- Location: 17300 CA-1, Pacific Palisades, California, 90272, United States
- Coordinates: 34°02′18″N 118°33′24″W
- Website: gladstones.com

Gladstones Malibu is an American seafood restaurant located on the Pacific Coast Highway in the Pacific Palisades neighborhood of Los Angeles.

== History ==
The original Gladstones was opened by Robert J. Morris on the site of the former Ted's Grill in Santa Monica Canyon in 1972 and then moved to its home on the beach at 17300 Pacific Coast Highway in 1981. Morris sold the restaurant in 1984 to W.R. Grace Co. but repurchased it in 1990. Richard Riordan, the former Mayor of Los Angeles, owned Gladstones since the mid-1990s. In 2008, Gladstones was the 37th highest grossing independent restaurant in the country. In 2009, the private company SBE assumed day-to-day operations as part of a management contract with Riordan which expired in 2014. Gladstone's re-assumed management of day-to-day operations thereafter.

The beachfront restaurant has undergone several name changes. When Robert J. Morris opened the restaurant at the site of Ted's Grill, he named it Gladstone's 4 Fish. The restaurant is frequently cited as Gladstone's or simply Gladstones.

The restaurant sold 35 tons of crab, 65,000 lobsters and 19 gallons of clam chowder each year as of 2002.

On August 8, 2016 Los Angeles County officials were said to press California state officials to allow a 40-year lease of the site of the restaurant to attract a new restaurant to take the place of Gladstones at Malibu. The restaurant, which had previously been the highest-grossing in California, had been claimed to be "seriously deteriorated and outdated" by then-Los Angeles County Supervisor Sheila Kuehl, who among others sought for the restaurant to be replaced with an alternative business. The restaurant continued to remain among the 100 highest-grossing eateries in the United States through the end of 2017. In 2018, Los Angeles County awarded the 40-year lease to new owners PCH Beach Associates LLC, while Riordan remained as the restaurant's concessionaire operator. The new owners announced plans to demolish the existing restaurant and replace it with a new venue designed by Frank Gehry and operated by Wolfgang Puck.

In 2020, amid the widespread shutdown of in-person dining during the COVID-19 pandemic, Supervisor Kuehl sponsored the "Gladstones Rent Relief" motion, which reduced the venue's rent while Los Angeles County kept restaurants from operating below 100 percent capacity. The restaurant remained closed from March through June 2020 as a result of the pandemic, while the plans for the Gehry/Puck restaurant were placed on hold.

In April 2023, longtime owner Richard Riordan died at the age of 92. Shortly thereafter, the concessionaire lease which Riordan's family held on the property expired, and the family did not seek to renew it. The plans for the Gehry/Puck redesign were revived by the property's owners, and Gladstones was announced to be closing in October. However, the County Board of Supervisors found that the property's permits were not in place, and that the venue could remain vacant for two years or longer. To fill the gap, a group of Gladstones employees formed a new operating concessionaire, the Gladstones Legacy Group, and took over operations in October. The employee-owned group received the authority to operate the restaurant until September 15, 2025, after which the Gehry/Puck redevelopment was scheduled to move forward.

During the 2025 Palisades Fire, the restaurant was threatened by the nearby blaze. The restaurant's parking lot served as a media staging area, and as such the business received additional media and live coverage attention. Although initial reports indicated the structure may have been lost, the restaurant survived, with damage being limited to an outside storage area.

On April 13, 2025, founder Robert Morris died in his home at the age of 81.

In October of 2025, the California Coastal Commission voted unanimously over community objections, to demolish Gladstones and allow the development of a new restaurant from Wolfgang Puck, designed by Frank Gehry.

== See also ==
- List of seafood restaurants
