= Cameron's Seafood Market =

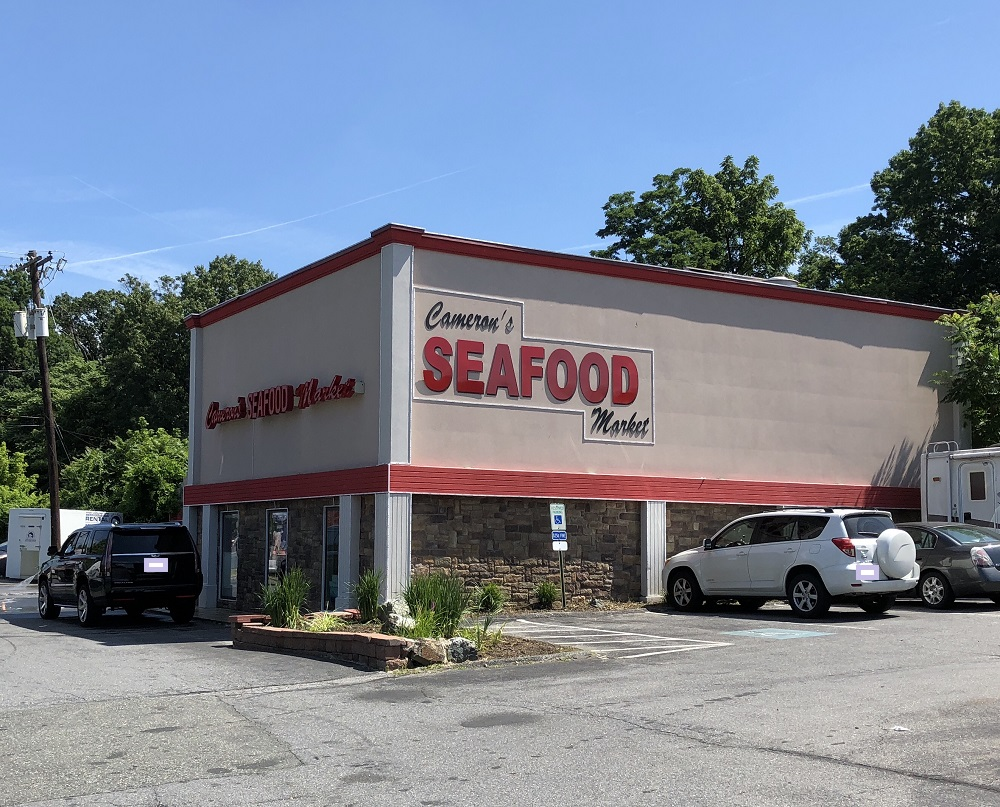
- The original location, and current main office, of Cameron's Seafood Market in Rockville, Maryland

Restaurant information
- Established: 1985
- Owners: Allen and Bijan Manesh
- Food type: Seafood
- Location: 875 Hungerford Drive (main office), Rockville, Maryland, Montgomery, Maryland, 20850, United States
- Other information: Multiple locations in Maryland, Pennsylvania
- Website: cameronsseafood.com

Cameron's Seafood Market is a chain of restaurants and a seafood wholesale delivery service based in Rockville, Maryland. Founded in 1985 as a single family-run store, it expanded to several storefront locations across Maryland and Pennsylvania, with food trucks, wholesale delivery, and a nationwide shipping service. It is the largest seller of Maryland Blue Crabs and crab cakes in the United States, selling over 150,000 crab cakes, 500,000 pounds of shrimp, and 75,000 bushels of live blue crabs annually. The company has served over one million customers, grosses $20 million, and its seafood was listed at the top of the Forbes list of "Best Food Gifts of 2017".

== History ==
Cameron's was founded in 1985 by Allen Manesh, an Iranian American who had immigrated to the United States from Iran in 1975. His initial core business was buying and selling real estate with his company Ideal Realty Group. Soon he wanted to diversify into food-selling to provide an additional revenue stream, so on a parcel of land which he had purchased in Rockville, he first tried to start a fruit stand business with his brother Bijan. After doing more research, and getting some advice from a sea captain, he changed the business to a seafood market, naming it after his first-born son Cameron. The business expanded over the years to other restaurant locations, several food trucks, and also wholesale delivery. As of 2017, it had approximately one dozen locations in the Maryland/Pennsylvania area, including four food trucks.

The company contracts directly with crabbers and distributors. Crabs are usually caught in the Chesapeake Bay region of Maryland, then shipped each morning to the Rockville location where they are sorted and cooked, primarily by steaming. The company has an official "True Blue Maryland Crab Meat" ranking from the Maryland Department of Agriculture. In Maryland's off-season (December through March), the crabs served are either from those flash-frozen earlier in the season, or shipped in from North Carolina, Florida, Texas, or Louisiana.

The highest-grossing location for the company is in Capital Heights, which has sales of $3.5 million annually. Sitting across from the football stadium FedExField, the store's business increases by 50% when the Washington Redskins play, as it is routine for the fans to buy a bushel of crabs to take with them into the game.

=== Online store ===
In June 2017 the founders' sons – the cousins Cameron (aged 37) and Peymon (aged 28) – launched a side business to sell the seafood via e-commerce, with the goal being to take online orders and ship to addresses across the United States. Products include seafood both raw and prepared, along with ingredients and recipes. Cameron, also president of the family's real estate business, is a graduate of University of Maryland, with a degree in business management and finance.

Online sales for the company are projected at $2.1 million in 2018. The internet business has eight fulltime employees, contracts with over a dozen teams of fishermen, and operates its own food-preparation facility. Shipments go out to all 50 states, and are especially popular among displaced Marylanders, athletes, and others transitioning to high-protein diets. Former NBA basketball star Gilbert Arenas regularly orders US$2,000 per month of crab meat from Cameron's, and in 2017 the company was listed on the Forbes magazine's list of "Best Food Gifts".

== See also ==
- List of seafood restaurants
