= Mul Yam =

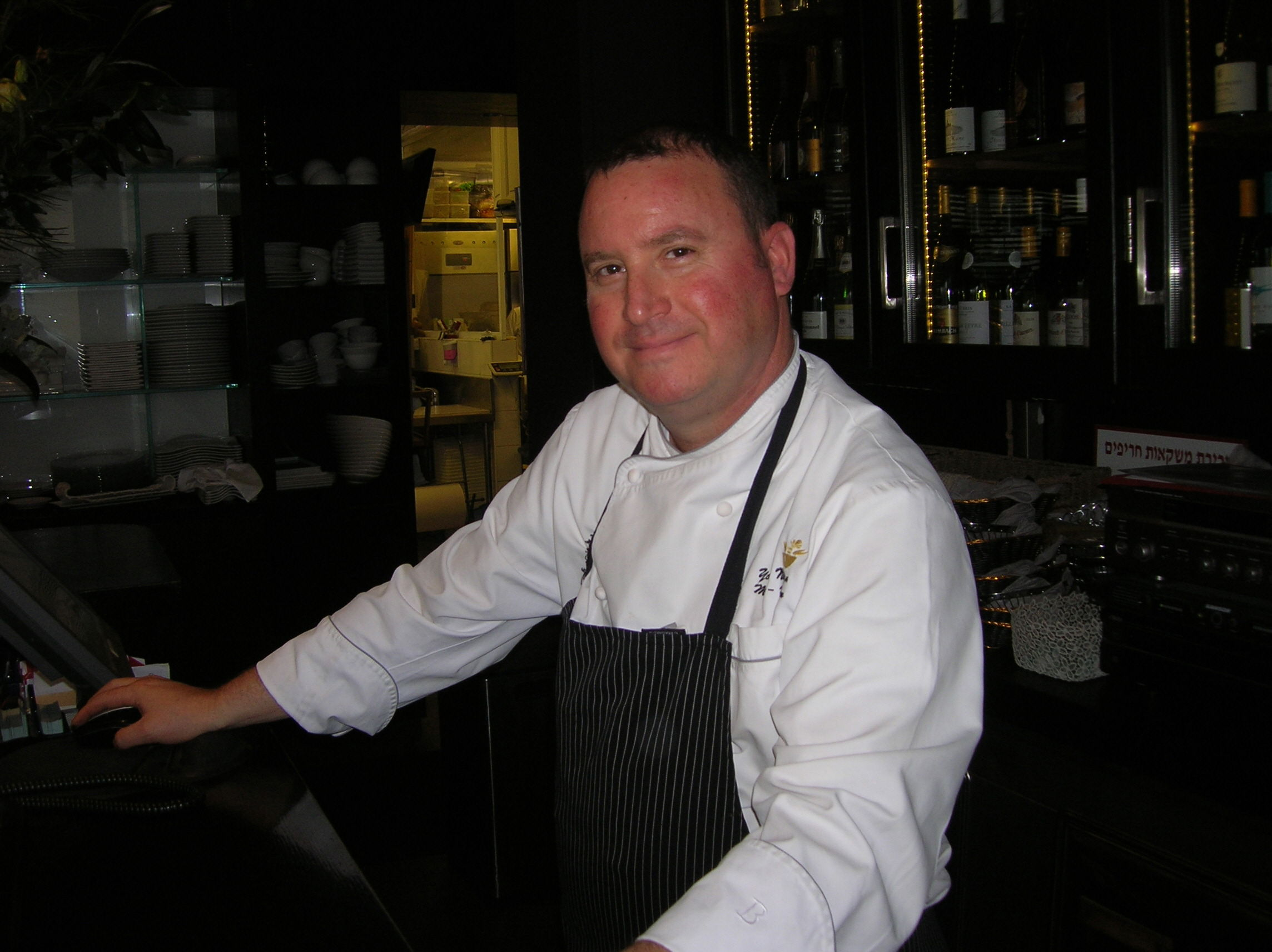
- Chef Yoram Nitzan
- Interactive map of Mul Yam

Restaurant information
- Established: 1995
- Owner: Shalom Maharovsky
- Head chef: Yoram Nitzan
- Food type: Seafood
- Location: Tel Aviv, Israel
- Coordinates: 32°6′1.4″N 34°46′28.25″E
- Website: www.mulyam.com

Mul Yam (Hebrew: מול ים ‘in front of a sea’ or ‘sea mussel’) was an Israeli restaurant located in Tel Aviv Port, Tel Aviv.

Mul Yam was established in 1995 by Shalom Maharovsky, its current owner; the chef is Yoram Nitzan. The restaurant specializes in seafood and fish, which are mainly imported from different parts of the world, and a few meat and vegetarian dishes.

Mapa guide to Israel's best restaurants writes: "The matching between the minimalist and delicate treatment of Yoram Nitzan and the finest fish, seafood, and wines that Shalom Maharovsky imports, makes Mul Yam the best fish restaurant in Israel and especially the best seafood restaurant in Israel."

Gault Millau Israel awarded the restaurant its top rating for five consecutive years.

It was chosen as one of the ten best restaurants in Israel by Sagi Cohen, Maariv (newspaper) food critic. and chosen as one of the best restaurants in Israel by Daniel Rogov, Haaretz food and wine critic and as one of the ten best restaurants by Al Hashulchan magazine Mapa guide writes, "Maybe it's the best restaurant in Israel.

On July 22, 2015, a fire caused by a short circuit in the restaurant's kitchen burned the place.

== See also ==
- List of restaurants in Israel
- List of seafood restaurants

== Gallery ==
Mul Yam
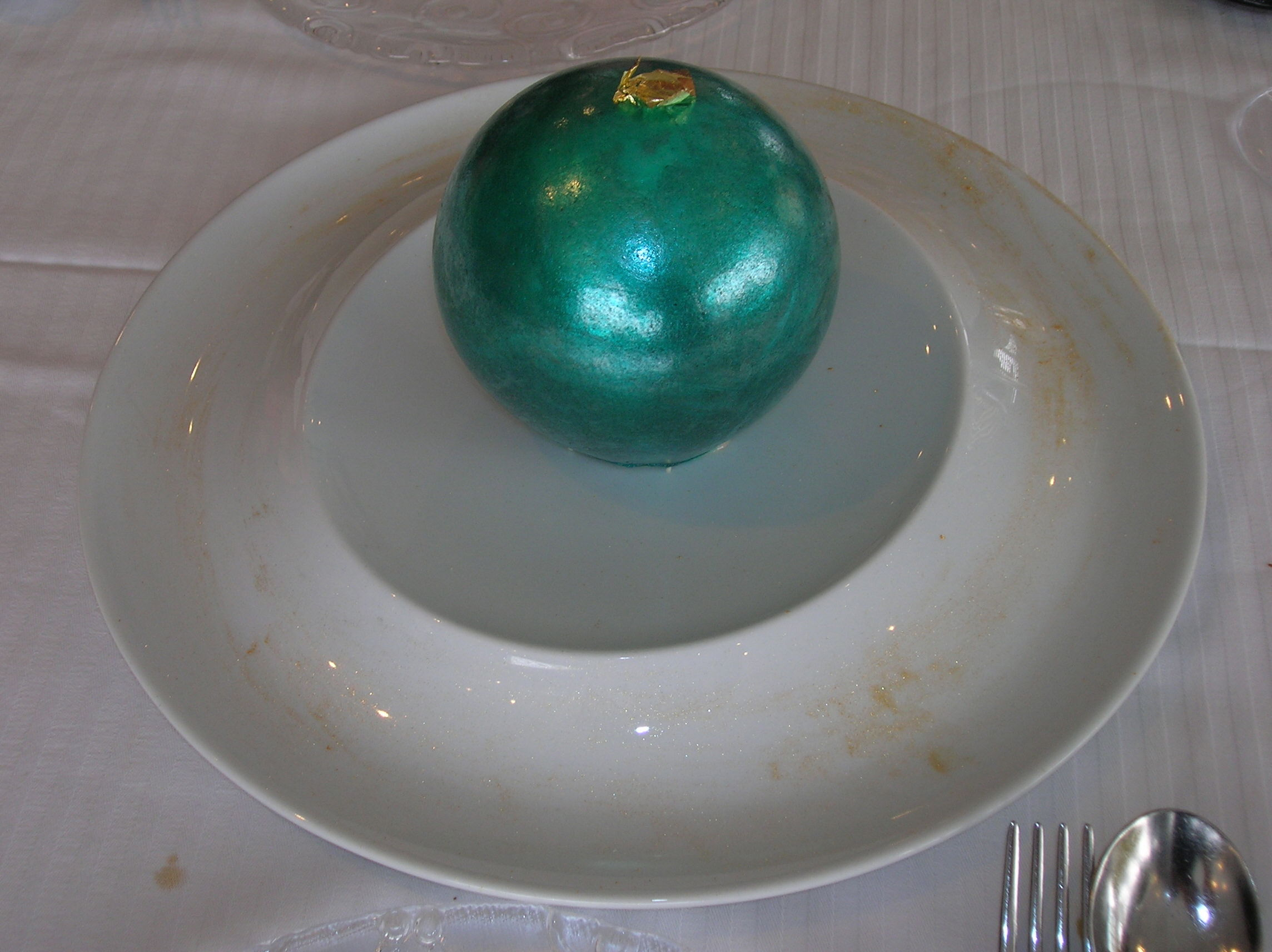

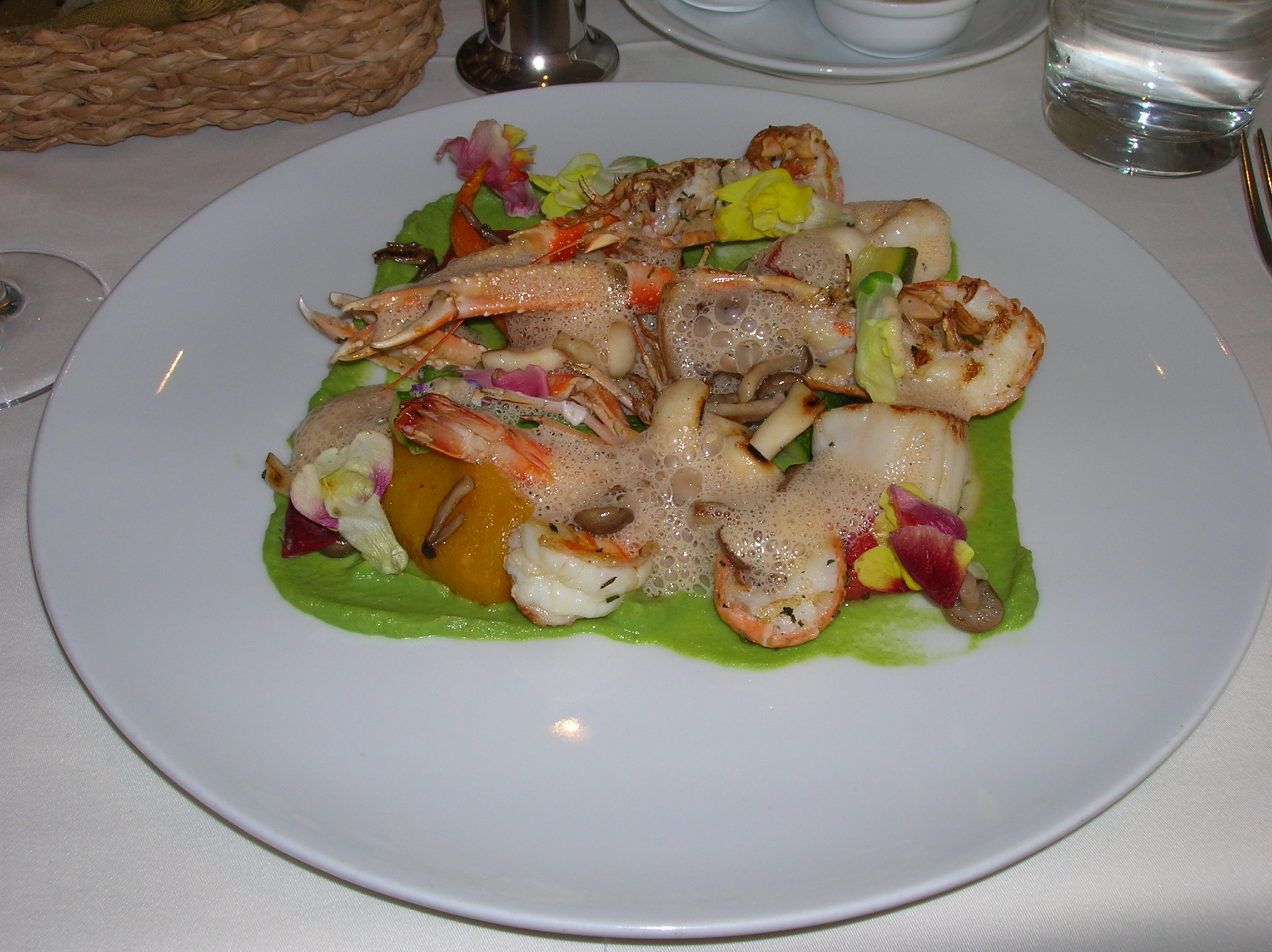

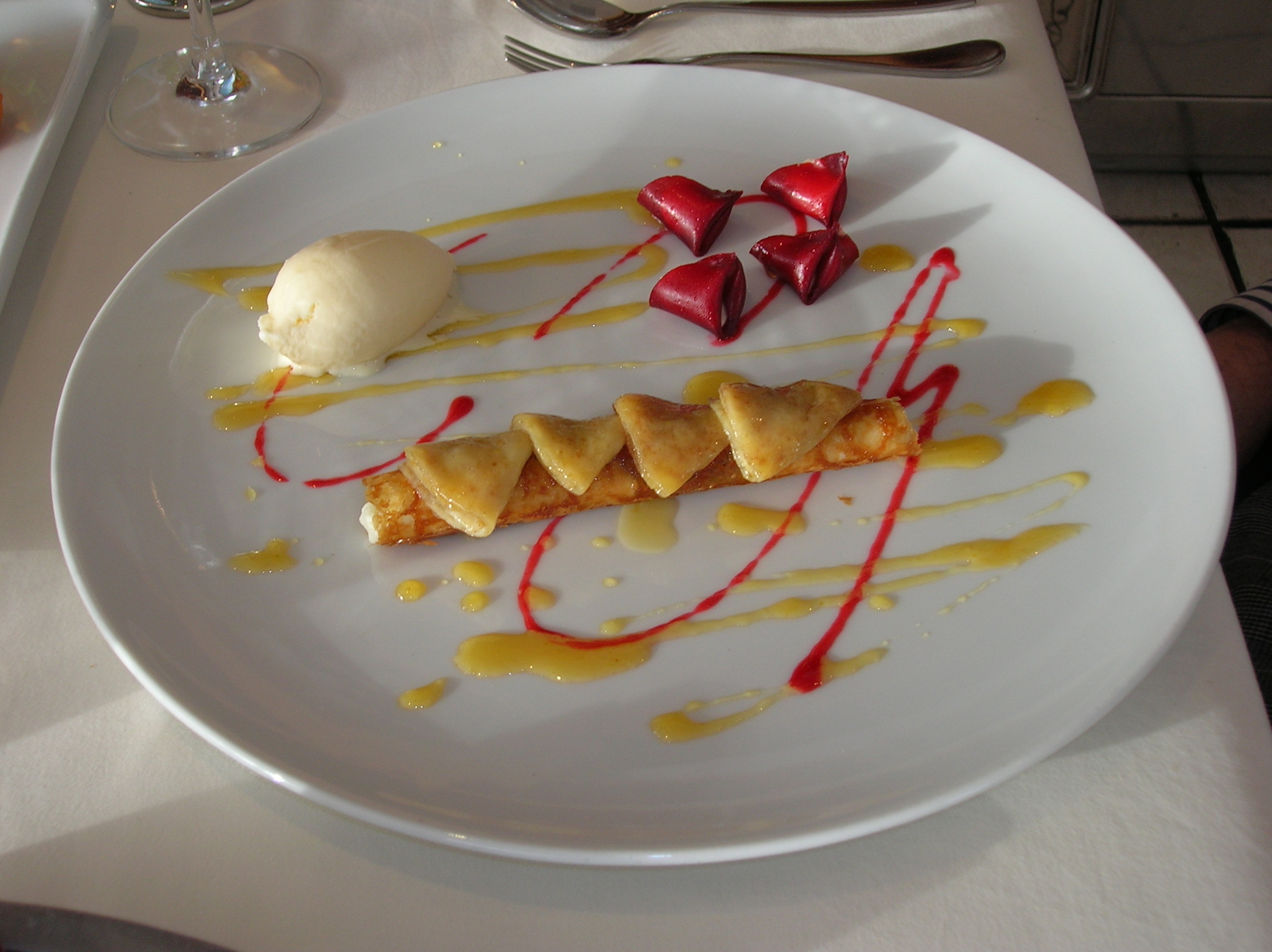

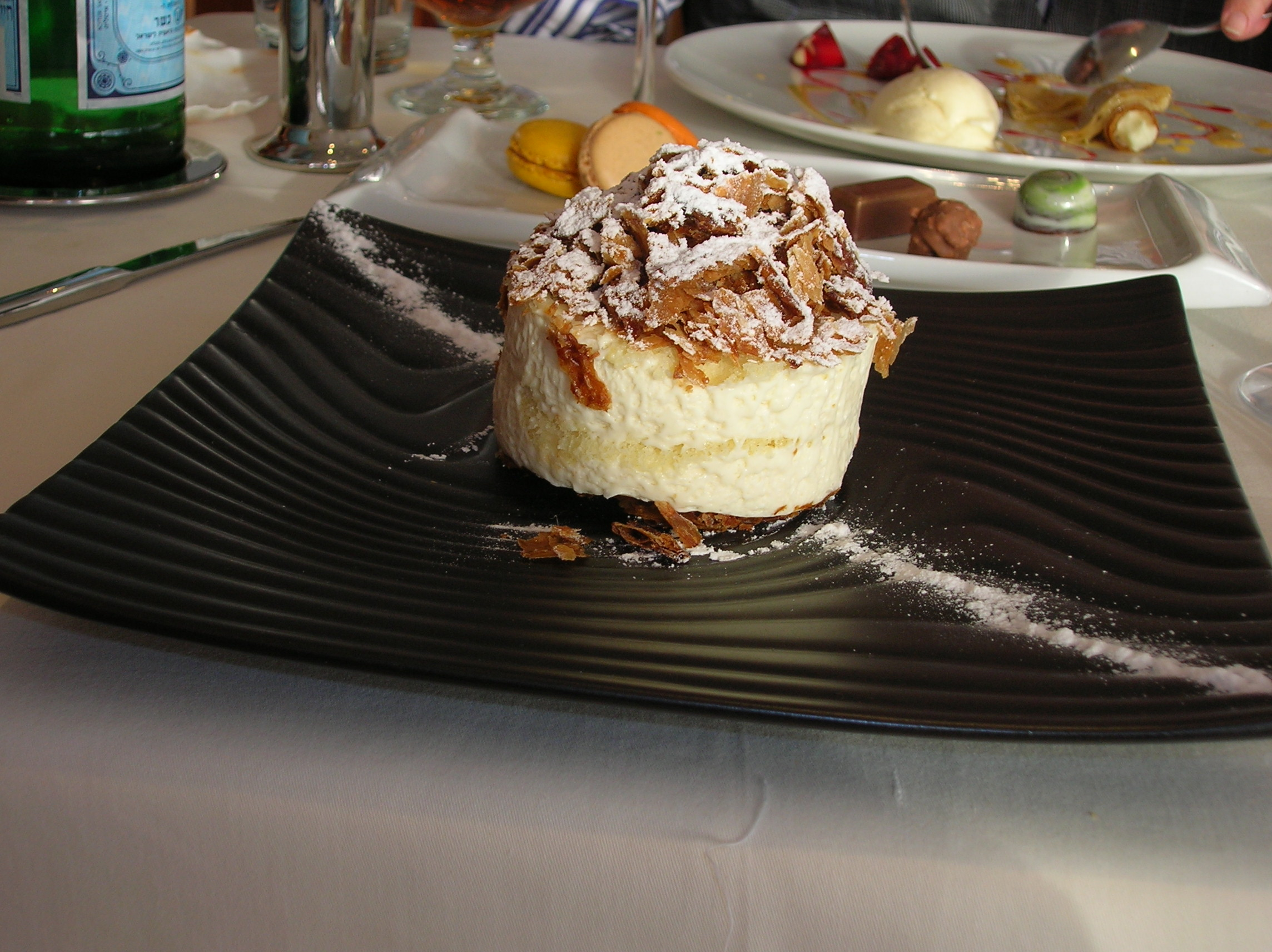

== In popular culture ==
In episode 14 of the sixth season of the American TV series The Office, "The Banker", manager Michael Scott is attempting to impress an investment banker by having Dwight Schrute pretend to be Computron, an advanced office virtual assistant. When Scott states that Cooper's Seafood has the best Maine lobster in the world, Schrute as Computron disputes this, saying Mul Yam's is better.
