= Ted Peters Famous Smoked Fish =

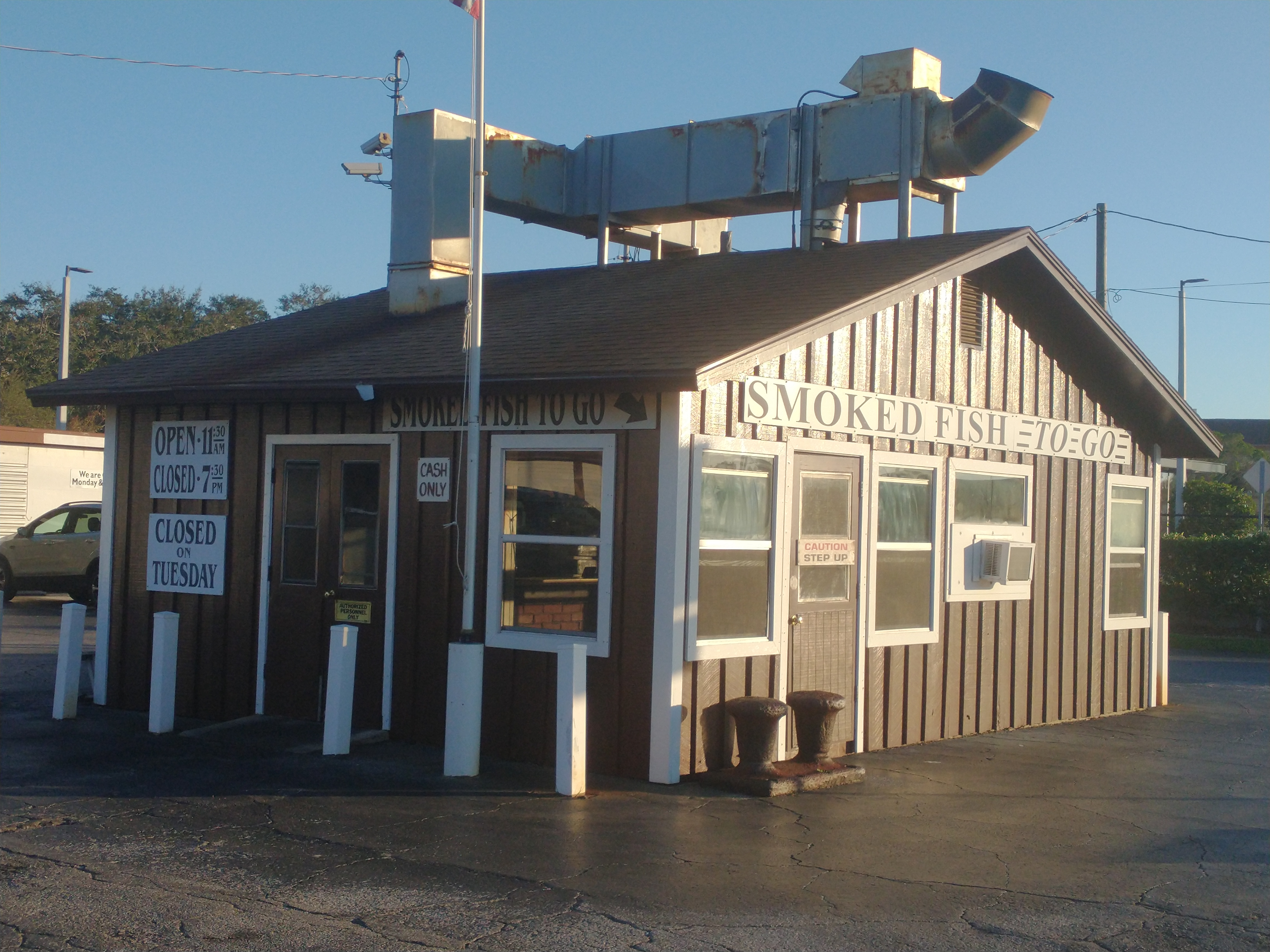
- One of the buildings of Ted Peters Famous Smoked Fish
- Interactive map of Ted Peters Famous Smoked Fish

Restaurant information
- Established: 1951; 75 years ago
- Location: 1350 Pasadena Ave S, South Pasadena, Florida, 33707, United States
- Coordinates: 27°45′22″N 82°44′13″W

Ted Peters Famous Smoked Fish is a historic smoked fish and hamburger restaurant in South Pasadena, Florida.

== History ==
The restaurant was established in 1947 on Madeira Beach by founder Ted Peters, who moved it to South Pasadena in 1949. The eatery serves wood smoked mullet and hamburgers in a casual atmosphere of stools and picnic tables. Jeff Klinkenberg called it one of the most famous eateries in Pinellas County and included a section on it in his book Seasons of Florida. It has been featured on The Best Thing I Ever Ate and Diners, Drive-Ins and Dives. German potato salad and Manhattan clam chowder have also become classic dishes at the restaurant. Ted Peters died in 2003 at 91. Ted Peters is located at 1350 Pasadena Avenue. Fruit pies made by Ted's mom were once a feature of the business.

== See also ==
- List of hamburger restaurants
- List of seafood restaurants
