= Riverside Restaurant =

- The Riverside Restaurant in West Bay
- Interactive map of Riverside Restaurant

Restaurant information
- Location: West Bay, United Kingdom
- Coordinates: 50°42′43″N 2°45′43″W

The Riverside Restaurant was a seafood restaurant in West Bay, England. The building is on a causeway and the dining area was on two levels with views of the river and beyond to the sea. In 2006, locally based food writer Hugh Fearnley-Whittingstall listed it as one of his top five seafood restaurants. In 2004 it was voted one of The Observer newspaper's Top 10 seafood restaurants. Fearnley-Whittingstall has also described it as arguably the most child-friendly restaurant in the country.

The restaurant served local fish and was traditionally closed in December and January (the months when the fishermen do not go out in the area due to rough seas).

== History ==
The origins of the Riverside stretch back into the early part of the last century when a tent was erected during the summer to provide tea and cakes. This was replaced by increasingly enlarged wooden huts and a post office was located on the same site. The present owners who had been in occupation since 1964 decided to rebuild the Riverside in 1976 to a design by the architects Piers Gough and Roger Zogolovitch. The building has had a few additions since that date but has remained largely the same. In 1964 the trade was limited to local fishermen, coach parties and people on camping holidays in the area. The menu was fairly basic with roast dinners and cream teas the specialities, although local fish and shellfish were listed. The rebuild in 1976 coincided with the spread of car ownership and holiday homes. This, allied to the appearance on television of champions of seafood such as Keith Floyd and Rick Stein, led to the restaurant offering a full seafood menu.

The restaurant changed hands in 2018.

== See also ==
- List of seafood restaurants
