= Joey's Seafood Restaurants =

Chain of restaurants in Canada

- Formerly: Joey's Only
- Type: Restaurant franchise
- Industry: Food service
- Founded: 1985 in Calgary, Alberta, Canada
- Founder: Joe Klassen
- Headquarters: Calgary, Alberta, Canada
- Products: Food and drink
- Website: Official Website

Joey's Seafood Restaurants (formerly Joey's Only) is a seafood restaurant chain in Canada.

The chain was started in Calgary, Alberta, Canada in 1985 by Joe Klassen and Richard Maas. Franchising began in 1992 and has expanded to 39 franchise locations in North America and is the largest seafood restaurant chain in Canada.

== See also ==
- List of seafood restaurants
- List of Canadian restaurant chains
