= Oceanique =

French-American cuisine restaurant in Evanston, Illinois

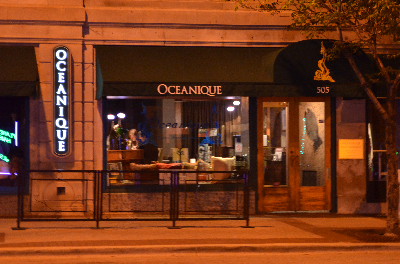
- The Front of Oceanique
- Interactive map of Oceanique

Restaurant information
- Established: 1989
- Owner: Mark Grosz
- Head chef: Mark Grosz
- Food type: French American French cuisine Seafood
- Dress code: Semi-casual
- Location: 505 Main St., Evanston, Illinois, 60202, United States
- Coordinates: 42.0341°N 87.6781°W
- Reservations: Yes
- Website: www.oceanique.com

Oceanique is a fine dining gourmet French-American cuisine restaurant in Evanston, Illinois that serves seafood. Oceanique has consistently been ranked as the number one seafood restaurant in the Chicago metro area by the Zagat Guide. "Make It Better Magazine" deemed it the best fine dining restaurant in 2014 and awarded them with the "Best of the North Shore" prize. It opened in 1989. Mark Grosz is the head chef and owner. It is located at 505 Main Street, two blocks from the Main St. 'L' Station. Oceanique has an adjoining outdoor patio that customers can use, weather permitting.

== Menu ==
Oceanique's menu, which consists solely of dinner selections, is subject to change daily due to the freshness and availability of the fish. The fish used are freshwater fish found in the Great Lakes Although Oceanique's specialty is seafood, the menu does include other meat, vegetarian, and vegan options. The cooking style is French, reflecting chef Mark Grosz's three-year training under Jean Banchet of Le Francais'. Mark Grosz also leanrned in Hong Kong and France. The dishes also incorporate many Asian and Latin ingredients.

The dishes are prepared using local, organic produce and seafood from green-friendly suppliers such as Supreme Lobster. The restaurant offers dishes off an à la carte menu but also offers a seasonal seven-course tasting menu. Both options are accompanied by an amuse-bouche interspersed throughout dinner, and sorbets of varying flavors as intermezzos. The bar menu includes lobster sandwiches, Maine pemaquid oysters, market ceviche, and poached shrimp.

== Wine list ==
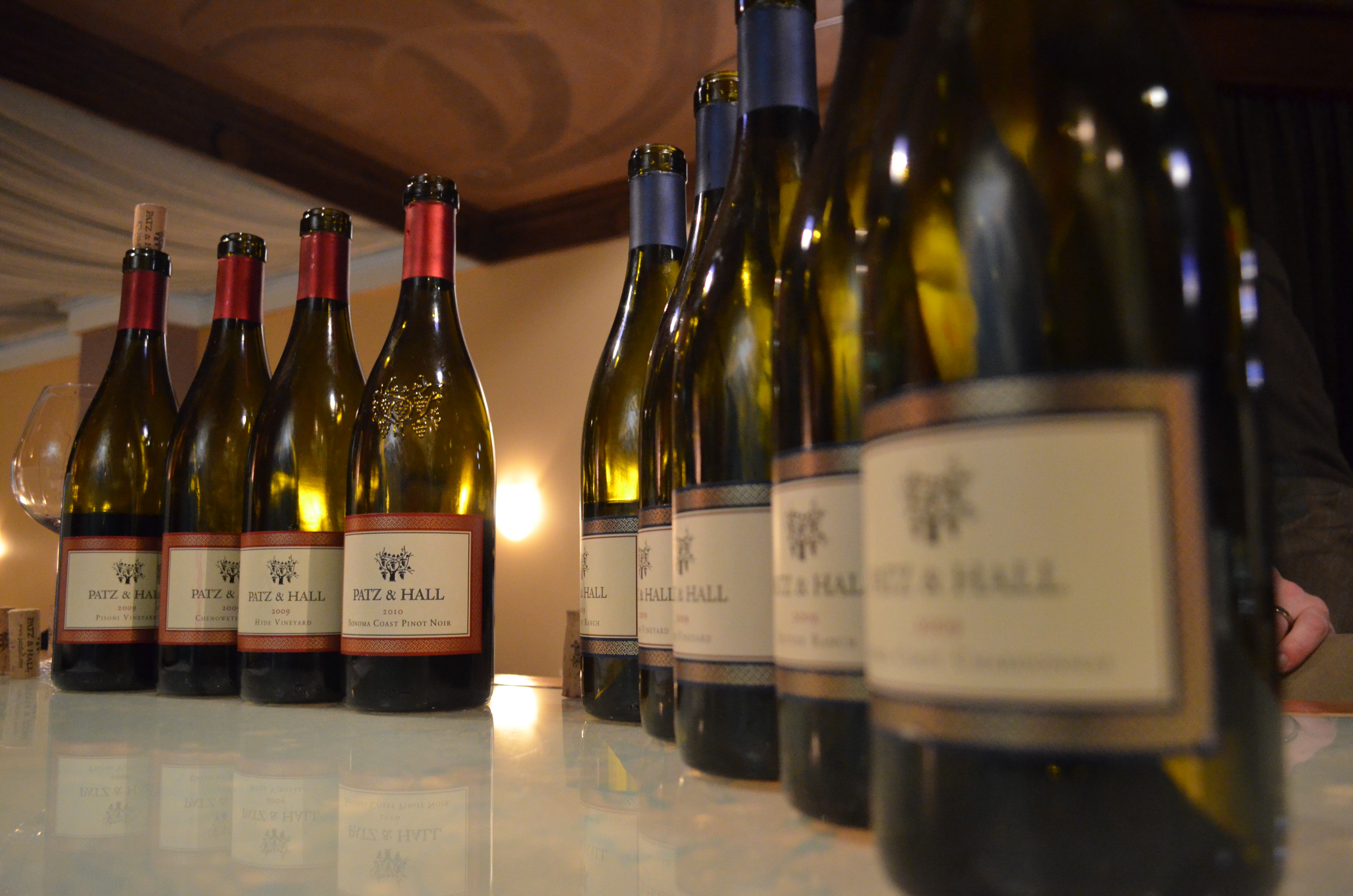
Some of Oceanique's wines

Oceanique is known for its extensive wine collection of nearly 900 wines, including rare Champagne, Burgundy, Bordeaux, and California Cabernet. The reserve library includes well-known labels such as Domaine de la Romanée-Conti, Angelo Gaja, and Domaine Leroy. As a result, Oceanique has consistently won the Wine Spectator Magazine's "Best of Award of Excellence" every year since 1993. Oceanique offers wine-paired dinners that come in three levels and at varying prices: the Introductory Cru Pairing, the Intermediate Cru Pairing, and the Grand Cru Pairing.

== Remodel ==
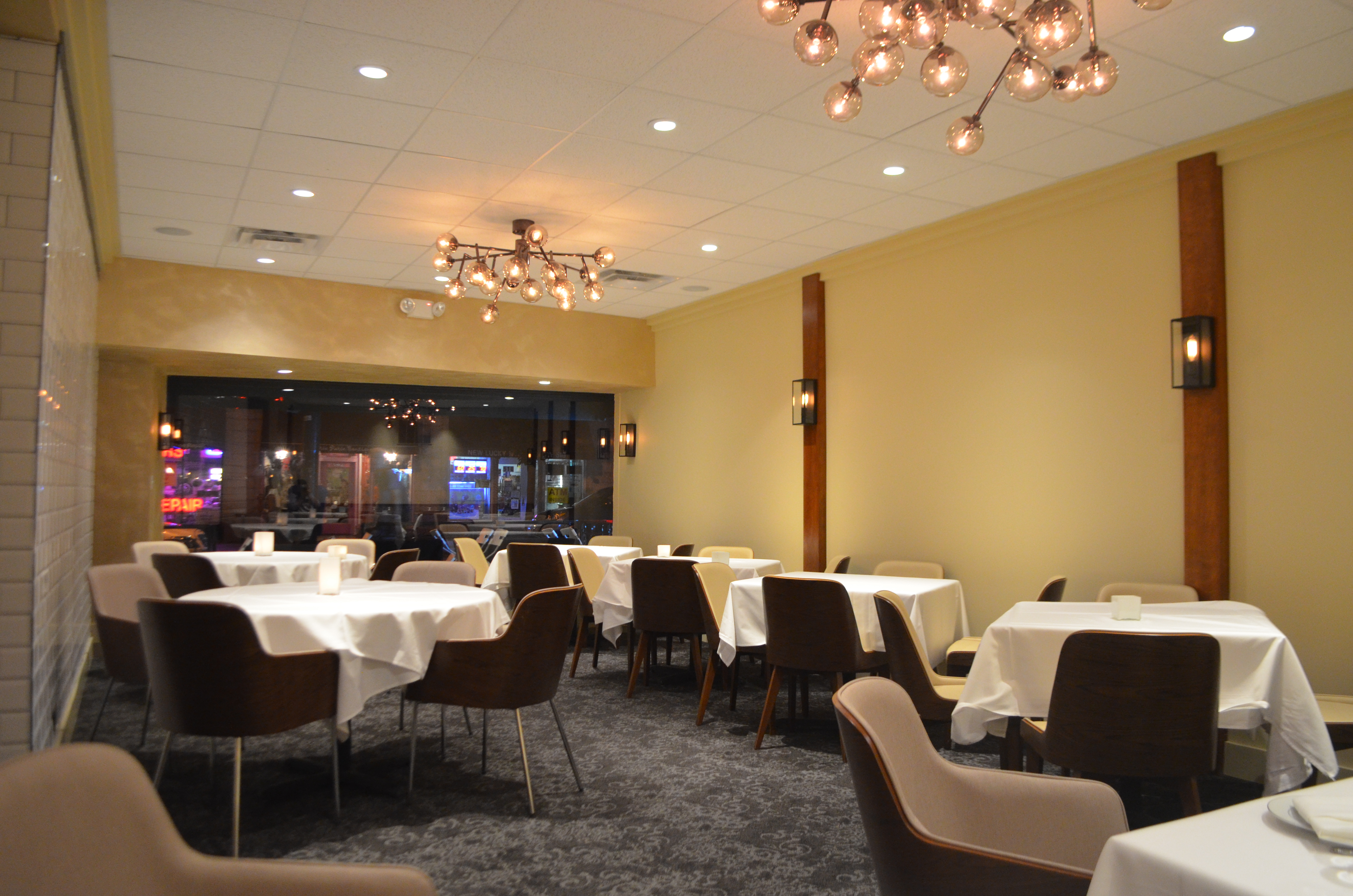
Remodeled West Room

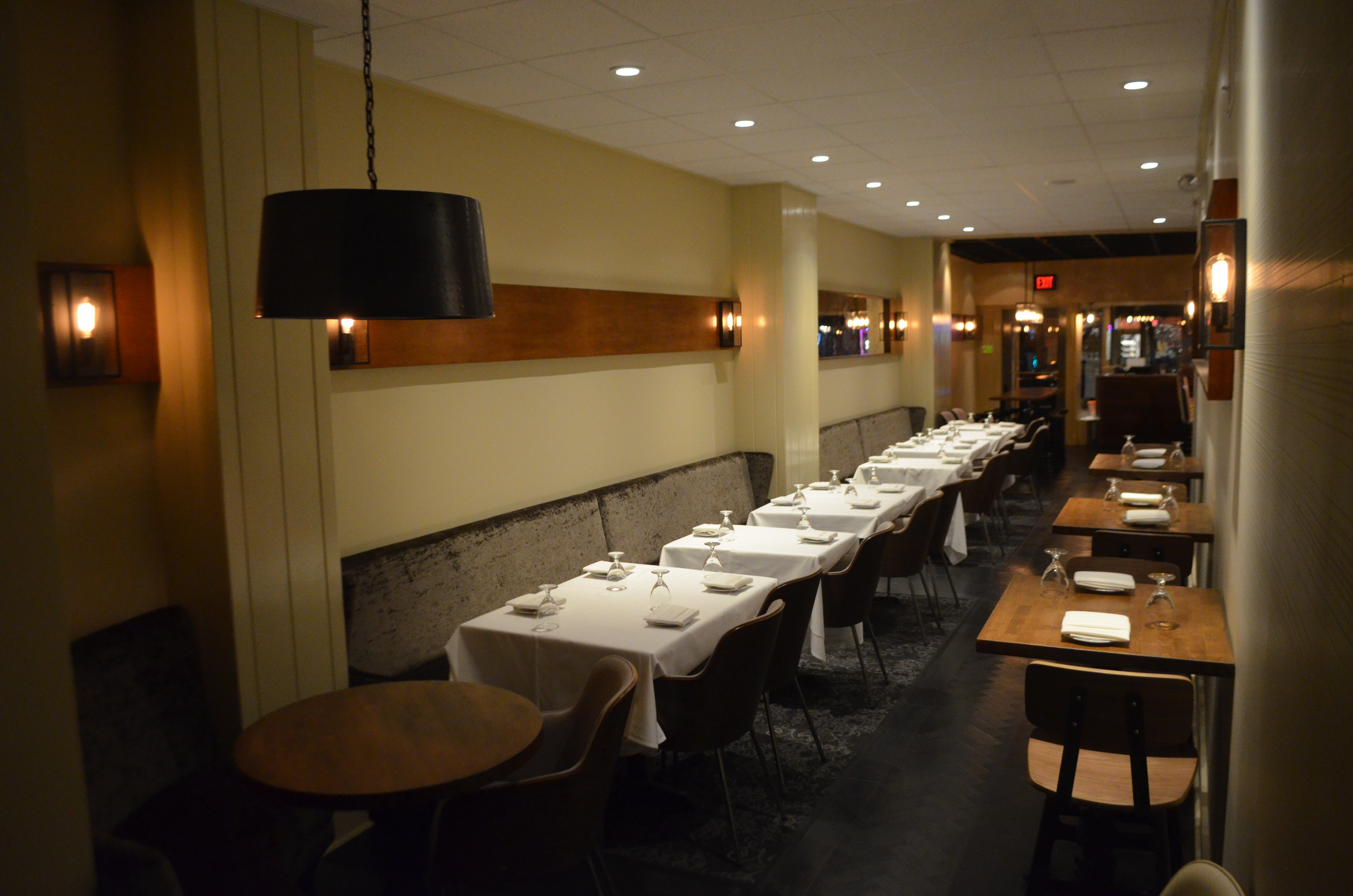
Remodeled East Room

Oceanique underwent significant remodeling in July 2013 during its annual summer closure. They went from what "Make it Better Magazine" calls a "country-French look and billowing draperies" to a more contemporary look. Oceanique consists of two dining rooms, with the West Room as the main dining room and the East Room as the room that customers walk into when they enter through the door. The bar is located in the East room. After the remodel, the bar area changed and added "a communal trestle table" that provides an extension of the bar to accommodate customers who want a drink and to eat a small plate or two. It also provides a waiting area.

== See also ==
- List of seafood restaurants
