= California Fish Grill =

American restaurant chain

- Type: Private
- Industry: Fast casual restaurant
- Founded: 1998; 28 years ago Gardena, California, U.S.
- Headquarters: Newport Beach, California, U.S.
- Number of locations: 50
- Area served: United States
- Key people: Bob Holden (CEO); Paul Potvin (CFO)
- Website: cafishgrill.com

California Fish Grill is a chain of restaurants located in the Greater Los Angeles, San Francisco Bay Area, Sacramento metropolitan areas, Nevada, Arizona, and the Washington metropolitan area which claim to serve only responsibly sourced seafood. The chain was founded in 1998 in Gardena, California by Victor Topete and is headquartered in Newport Beach, California.

== Locations ==
As of March 2024, California Fish Grill has fifty-three locations in California. It also has two locations in Arizona and three locations in Nevada.

== Menu ==
The chain claims to serve only sustainably sourced seafood. The seafood is wild-caught or farmed following the Seafood Watch advisory list by the Monterey Bay Aquarium.

The menu focuses on flame-grilled seafood. The chain also offers bowls, tacos, and fried seafood.

== See also ==
- List of seafood restaurants
