= Seattle Fish Guys =

Fish market and restaurant in Seattle, Washington, U.S.

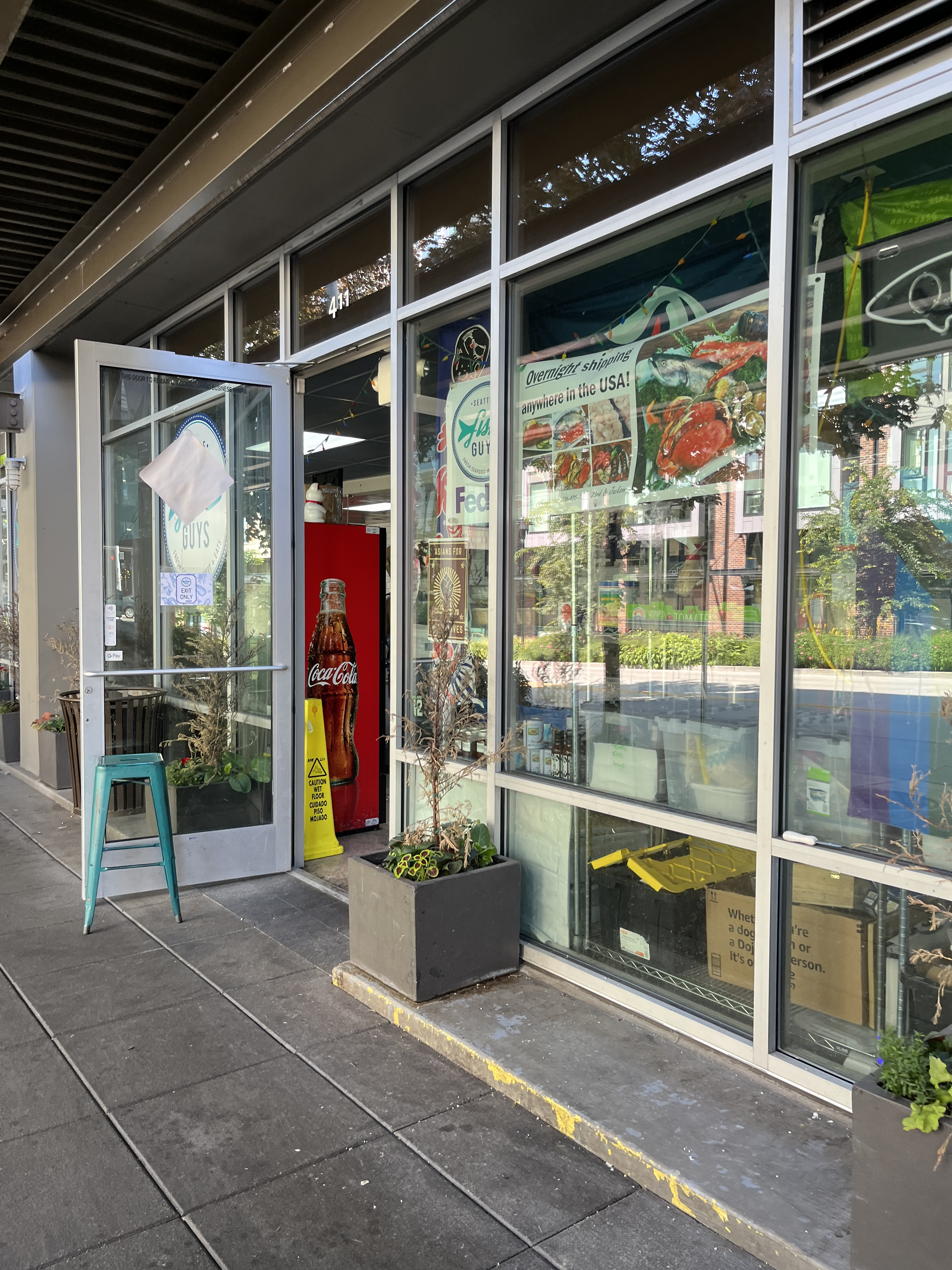
- The shop's exterior in 2023
- Interactive map of Seattle Fish Guys

Restaurant information
- Established: 2016
- Food type: Seafood
- Location: 411 23rd Avenue South, Seattle, King, Washington, 98144, United States
- Coordinates: 47.5989°N 122.3026°W
- Website: seattlefishguys.com

Seattle Fish Guys is a fish market and restaurant in Seattle's Central District, in the U.S. state of Washington. Desiree Chinn and Sal Panelo started the business in 2016. Seattle Fish Guys has garnered a positive reception, especially for its poke, and is considered among the city's best seafood restaurants.

== Description ==
Seattle Fish Guys is a "gleaming, upscale" fish market and restaurant in Seattle's Central District, according to The Seattle Times. The business operates in the Verse Seattle building at the intersection of 23rd and Jackson. It has sold bivalves (including mussels), clam chowder, crab and shrimp cocktails, fish, poke, and smoked lox. Ingredients in bowls include kimchi, macaroni salad, octopus, brown or white rice, salmon, seaweed salad, and tuna. The crab rolls (or Dungeness crab "subs") have Japanese mayonnaise, Sriracha, and scallions on a toasted bun. The restaurant's aioli has garlic.

Seattle Fish Guys also stocks flowers and spice rubs, and has created take-home meal kits for special occasions. One for Lunar New Year had steamed black cod with black bean sauce and mochi donuts.

== History ==
Co-owners Desiree Chinn and Sal Panelo opened Seattle Fish Guys in 2016. The restaurant's grand opening celebration was held on September 4, and featured free samples and a mussel eating contest.

== Reception ==
The magazine Seattle Metropolitan says of Seattle Fish Guys: "One of the Central District's favorite destinations for a convivial lunch is also an after-work godsend for picking up dinner." Aimee Rizzo of The Infatuation said of the poke in 2020, "Between the soy-marinated tuna, spicy salmon, furikake rice, and smoky macaroni salad, this is a bowl that's better than the sum of its parts—even though each part is excellent." She and Kayla Sager-Riley included Seattle Fish Guys in a 2023 overview of the city's best poke and a 2024 overview of the city's best seafood. In 2023, the South Seattle Emerald said the shop was among chef J. Kenji López-Alt's favorite South End eateries.

Megan Hill included Seattle Fish Guys in Eater Seattle's 2022 overview of fifteen "great places" to eat in the Central District. Noms Magazine ranked the business eighth in a 2023 list of Seattle's thirteen best seafood restaurants, and recommended the crab sub, the idako (marinated baby octopus), and the poke bowl. Allecia Vermillion included the restaurant in Seattle Metropolitan's 2024 overview of the city's best seafood.

== See also ==
- Jack's Fish Spot
- List of seafood restaurants
- Pike Place Fish Market
