= List of seafood restaurants =

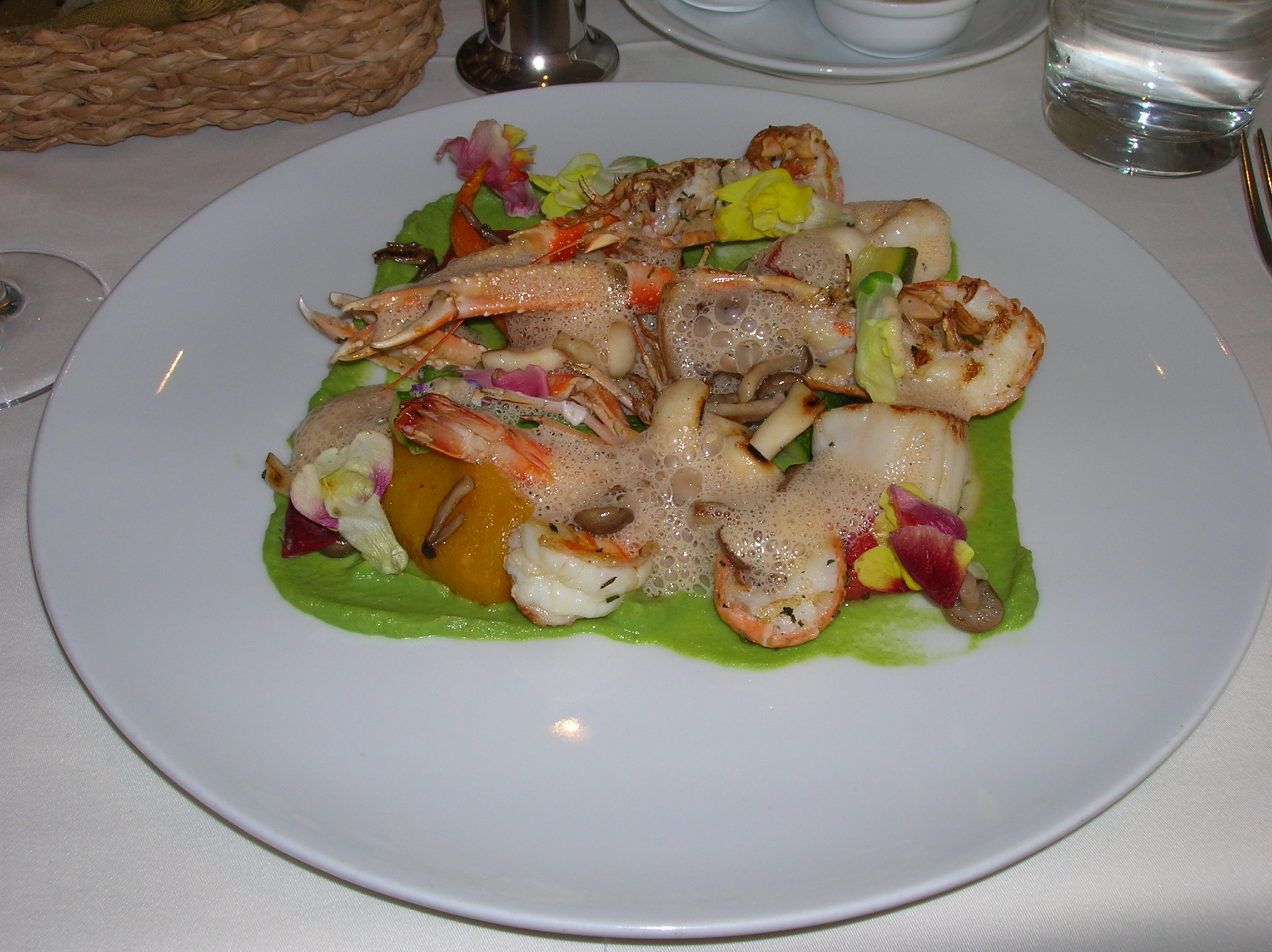
A seafood dish at Mul Yam restaurant, located at Tel Aviv Port, Tel Aviv, Israel

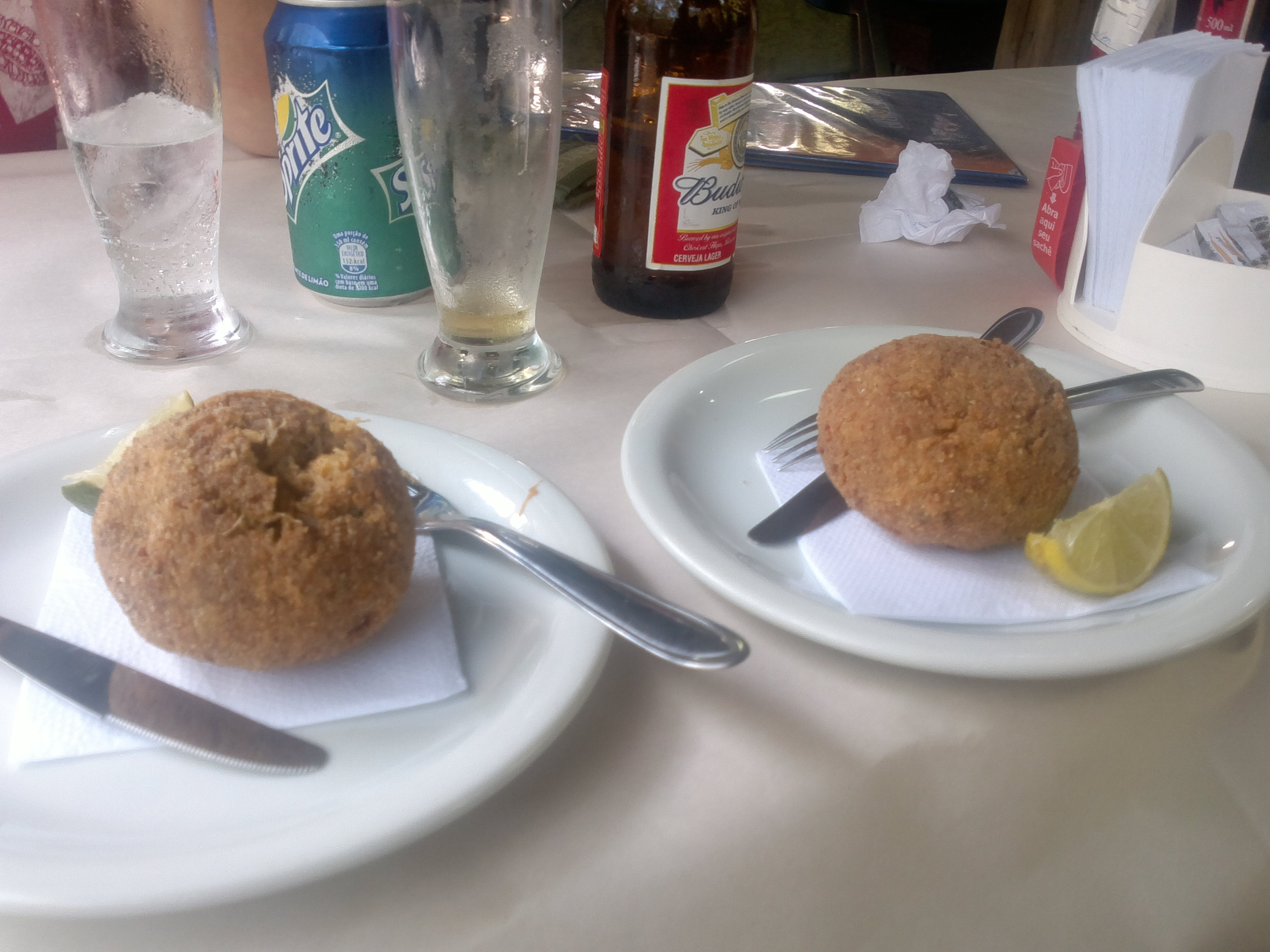
Stuffed blue crab shells known as Casquinha de Siri being enjoyed in Tropicana Restaurant at Rio de Janeiro City

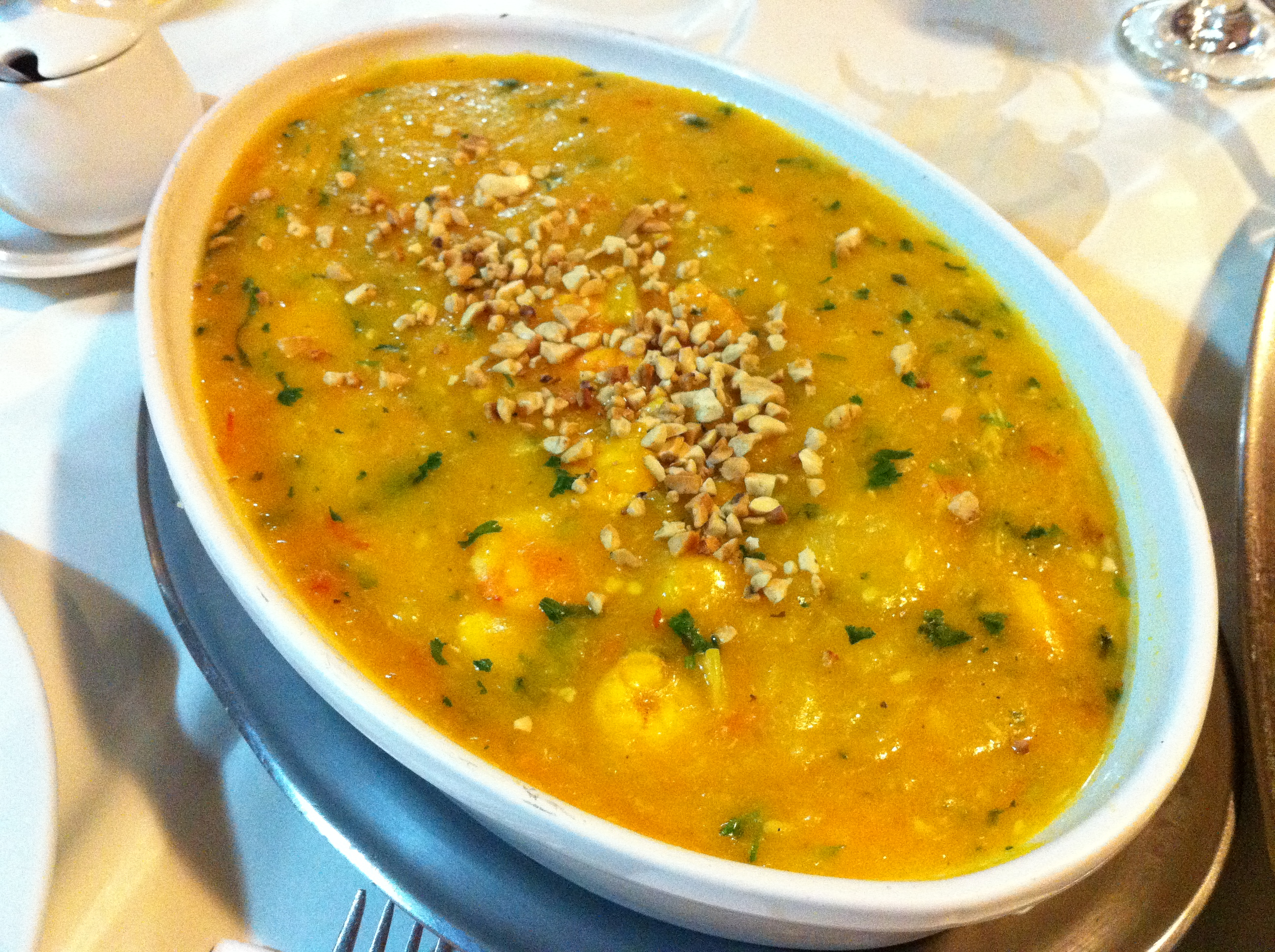
A bobó de camarão dish at a Rio de Janeiro restaurant

The following is a list of notable seafood restaurants. A seafood restaurant typically specializes in seafood cuisine and seafood dishes, such as fish and shellfish.

== Seafood restaurants ==
=== Australia ===
- Doyles on the Beach

=== Brazil ===
- Vivenda do Camarão

=== Canada ===
- Joey's Seafood Restaurants
- Prime Seafood Palace
- Restaurant 20 Victoria, Toronto

=== Germany ===
- Nordsee

=== Hong Kong ===
- ClubONE Riviera
- Heichinrou Hong Kong
- Jumbo Kingdom

=== Ireland ===
- Leo Burdock
- Moran's Oyster Cottage

=== Israel ===
- Mul Yam

=== Mexico ===
- Le Bistro, Puerto Vallarta
- The Blue Shrimp, Puerto Vallarta
- Conchas de Piedra, Valle de Guadalupe, Baja California
- El Dorado, Puerto Vallarta, Jalisco
- La Palapa, Puerto Vallarta

=== Netherlands ===
- The Seafood Bar

=== Singapore ===
- Jumbo Seafood
- Long Beach Seafood Restaurant
- Palm Beach Seafood

=== South Africa ===
- Ocean Basket

=== Sweden ===
- Sturehof

=== Thailand ===
- Royal Dragon Restaurant

=== United Kingdom ===
- Anstruther Fish Bar, Scotland
- The Ashvale, Scotland
- Bentley's Oyster Bar and Grill
- Harbourmaster Hotel
- Harry Ramsden's
- Loch Fyne Oysters, Scotland
- Loch Fyne Restaurants
- Magpie Café, England
- Riverside Restaurant, England
- Scott's
- Sweetings

=== United States ===
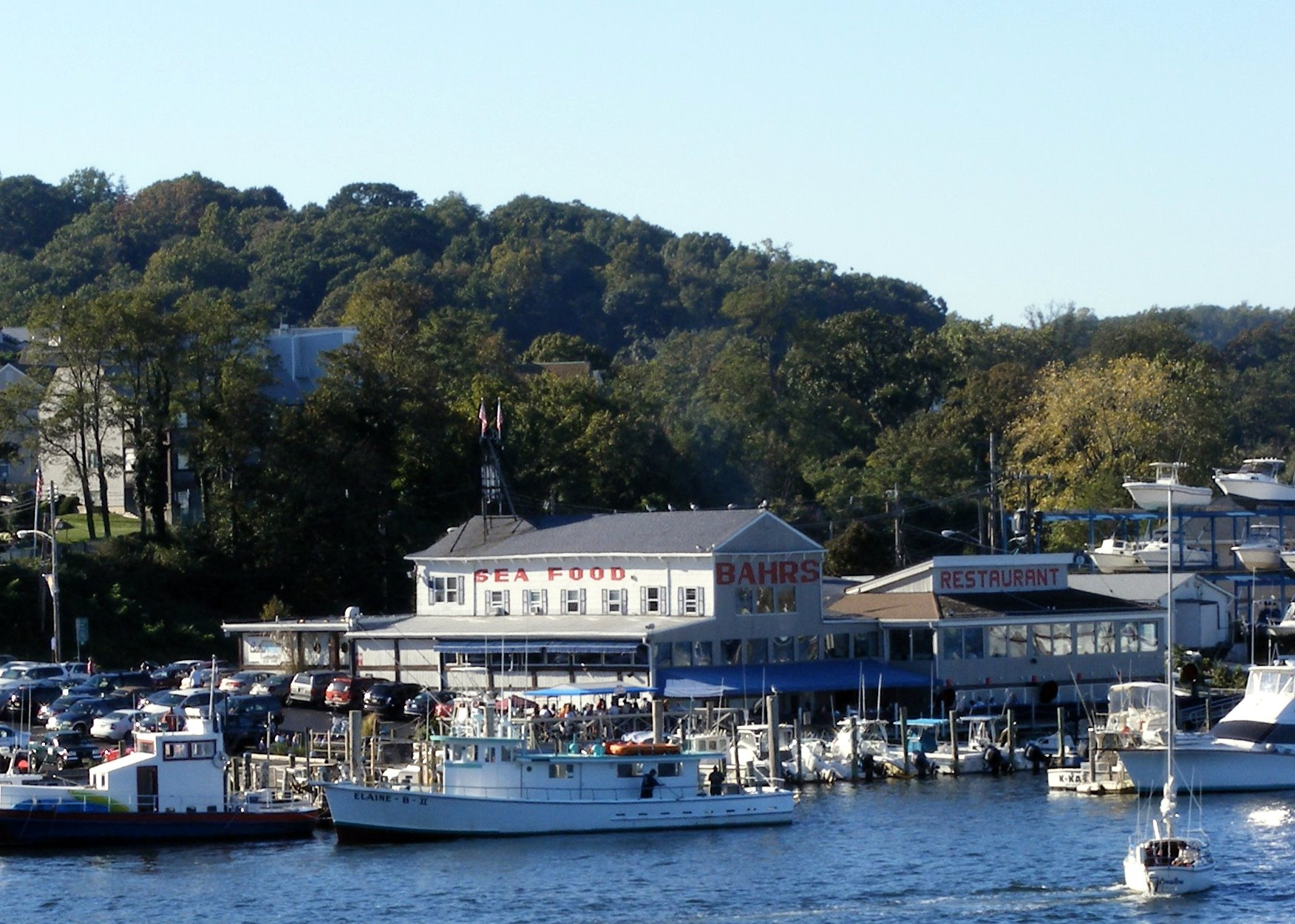
Bahrs Landing Famous Seafood Restaurant and Marina in Highlands, New Jersey

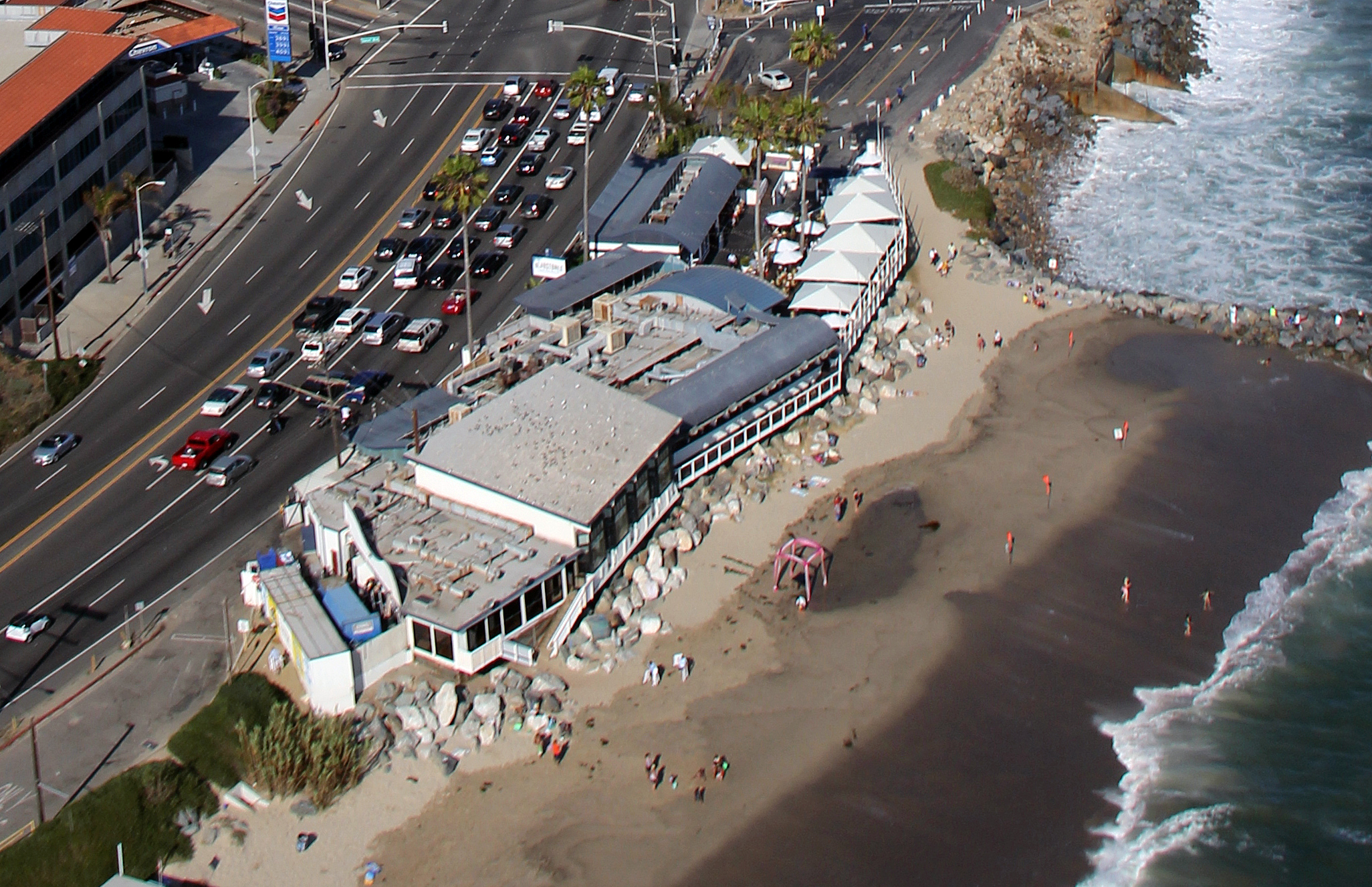
Aerial photo of Gladstones Malibu

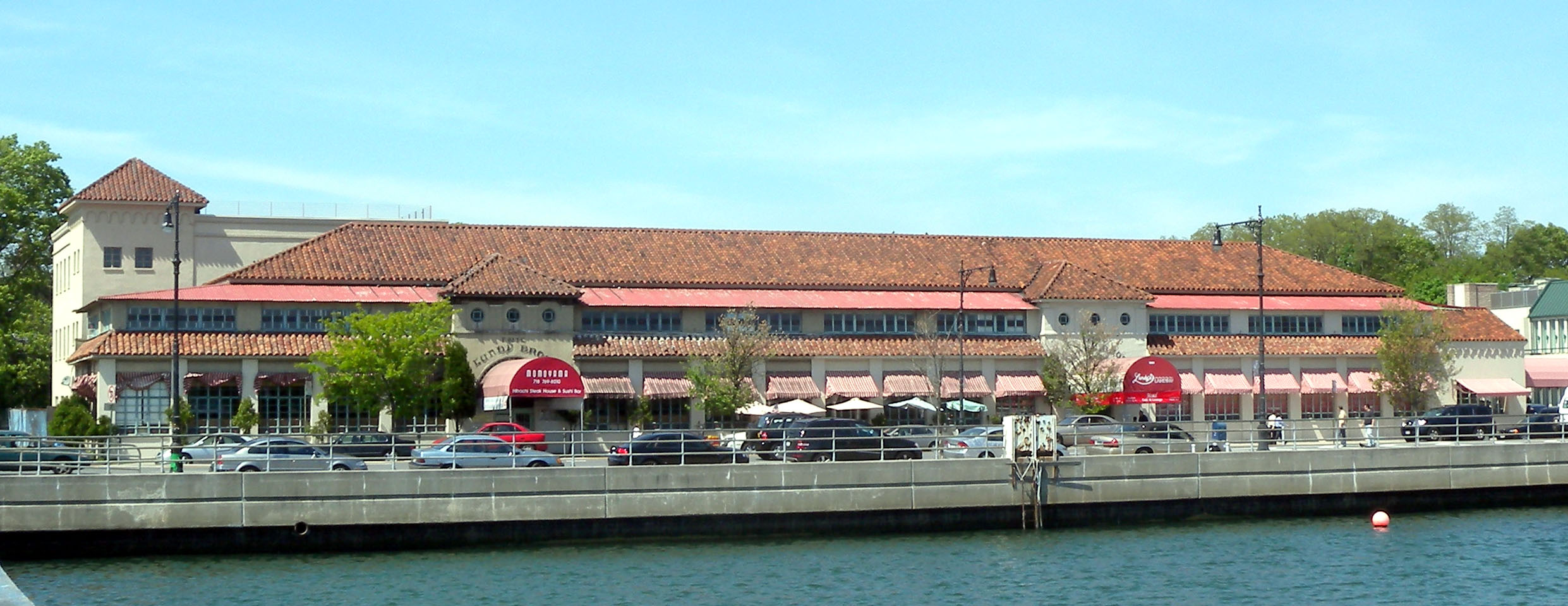
Lundy's Restaurant is located in the Sheepshead Bay neighborhood of the New York City borough of Brooklyn.

Seafood restaurants in the United States include:

- Arthur Treacher's
- Aunt Carrie's, Narragansett, Rhode Island
- Bagaduce Lunch, Brooksville, Maine
- Bahrs, Highlands, New Jersey
- Bonefish Grill
- Boston Sea Party (defunct)
- Bubba Gump Shrimp Company
- California Fish Grill
- Calumet Fisheries, Chicago
- Cameron's Seafood Market
- Captain D's
- The Clam Shack, Maine
- Colonnade (defunct)
- Coral Reef Restaurant
- Driftwood Inn and Restaurant, Vero Beach, Florida
- East Coast Grill
- Eddie V's Prime Seafood
- Greek Islands, Chicago
- Gus Stevens Seafood Restaurant & Buccaneer Lounge, Biloxi, Mississippi (defunct)
- H. Salt Esq. Fish & Chips
- Hank's Oyster Bar, Washington, D.C., and Alexandria, Virginia
- Hayato, Los Angeles
- Hoss's Steak and Sea House
- Ivar's
- Joe's Crab Shack
- Joe's Stone Crab, Miami Beach, Florida
- L_{2}O, Chicago (defunct)
- Legal Sea Foods
- Local Tide, Seattle
- Long John Silver's
- McCormick & Schmick's
- McGrath's Fish House
- Mitchell's Fish Market, Columbus, Ohio
- Ocean Prime
- Oceanique, Evanston, Illinois
- Pappadeaux
- Pêche Seafood Grill, New Orleans
- Phillips Foods, Inc. and Seafood Restaurants
- Porto, Chicago
- Red Lobster
- Red's Eats, Wiscasset, Maine
- Roy's
- Salt Shack on the Bay, Tampa, Florida
- Saltbox Seafood Joint, Durham, North Carolina
- Sam Woo Restaurant
- Schultz's Crab House
- Shuckum's Oyster Bar, Hollywood, Florida
- Skippers Seafood & Chowder House
- Ted Peters Famous Smoked Fish, South Pasadena, Florida
- Thurston's Lobster Pound, Maine
- Todai
- Union Oyster House, Boston
- Vivenda do Camarão, Florida
- Water Grill
- Waterman's Beach Lobster, South Thomaston, Maine (defunct)
- Weathervane Restaurant
- Woodman's of Essex, Essex, Massachusetts
- Yia Yia Mary's, Houston, Texas

==== California ====
Notable seafood restaurants in California include:

- Angler, San Francisco
- Chez Melange, Redondo Beach
- The Crab Cooker, Newport Beach
- Gladstones Malibu, Pacific Palisades
- Old Fisherman's Grotto, Monterey
- Slapfish, Huntington Beach
- Spenger's Fresh Fish Grotto, Berkeley (defunct)
- Swan Oyster Depot, San Francisco
- Tadich Grill, San Francisco

==== New York ====
Notable seafood restaurants in New York include:

- Aquagrill, New York City (defunct)
- Atlantic Grill, New York City
- Le Bernardin, New York City
- Caviar Russe, New York City
- Grand Central Oyster Bar & Restaurant, New York City
- Lundy's Restaurant, New York City (defunct)
- Marea, New York City
- Oceana, New York City
- Umbertos Clam House, New York City
- Vestry, New York City

==== Oregon ====
Notable seafood restaurants in Oregon include:

- Acadia: A New Orleans Bistro, Portland
- Batterfish, Portland
- Câche Câche, Portland
- Country Bill's, Portland
- Dan and Louis Oyster Bar, Portland
- Eat: An Oyster Bar, Portland
- Fish Grotto, Portland, Oregon (defunct)
- Flying Fish Company, Portland
- Jacqueline, Portland
- Jake's Famous Crawfish, Portland
- The Malarkey, Portland
- MÄS, Ashland
- The Parish, Portland
- Portland Fish Market, Portland
- RingSide Fish House, Portland
- Seasons and Regions Seafood Grill, Portland
- Southpark Seafood, Portland
- Wong's King, Portland

==== Washington ====
Notable seafood restaurants in Washington include:

- Athenian Seafood Restaurant and Bar, Seattle
- BluWater Bistro
- Coastal Kitchen, Seattle
- Emmett Watson's Oyster Bar, Seattle
- Fisherman's Restaurant and Bar, Seattle
- Jack's Fish Spot, Seattle
- Jackson's Catfish Corner, Seattle
- Joyale Seafood Restaurant, Seattle
- Lark, Seattle
- Matt's in the Market, Seattle
- Palisade, Seattle
- Seattle Fish Guys, Seattle
- The Walrus and the Carpenter, Seattle
- White Swan Public House, Seattle

== See also ==
- List of fish and chip restaurants
- List of oyster bars
- List of sushi restaurants
