= The Ashvale =

Scottish restaurant

Coordinates: 57°8′22″N 2°6′56″W

- The first branch on Aberdeen's Great Western Road
- Industry: Restaurant
- Founded: 1979 in Scotland
- Headquarters: Scotland
- Area served: UK
- Products: Seafood
- Website: www.theashvale.co.uk

The Ashvale is a chain of fish and chip restaurants and takeaways in the north-east of Scotland.

The flagship restaurant, which opened in 1979, is situated on the Great Western Road in Aberdeen. Other restaurants and takeaways in the chain of Ashvale restaurants are located in Banchory, Portlethen, Dundee, Elgin, Ellon and Inverurie.

By the mid-1990s the restaurant complex in Aberdeen had 300 seats and was open 7 days a week. In 2004, the chain served about 30,000 customers each week, selling approximately 18,000 fillets of fish.

Haddock, chips and mushy peas

== Awards ==
The Ashvale won several awards in the 1990s before it retired from competing:

- Scotland's Fish and Chip Shop of the Year 1989/1990
- Scotland's Fish and Chip Shop of the Year 1990/1991
- Scotland's Fish and Chip Shop of the Year 1993/1994
- UK's Fish and Chip Shop of the Year 1990/1991
- UK Enterprise Award 1989/1990
- UK Enterprise Award 1990/1991
- UK Enterprise Award 1996/1997

== See also ==
- List of seafood restaurants
