= Vivenda do Camarão =

Brazilian restaurant chain

- Industry: Restaurant
- Founded: Brazil
- Headquarters: Coral Springs, Florida, USA
- Number of locations: 150+ stores in Brazil, proposed up to 8 in U.S. and 1 store in Paraguay
- Area served: Brazil, Florida and Paraguay
- Products: Seafood
- Website: www.vivendadocamarao.com.br www.shrimp-house.com

Vivenda do Camarão (House of Shrimp), is a Brazilian restaurant chain. It opened its first U.S. restaurant in Coral Springs, Florida. U.S. locations use the name The Shrimp House. The company plans to open 8 restaurants in Florida in 2014.

== See also ==
- List of seafood restaurants
