= Ocean Basket =

South African seafood restaurant chain

- Type: Private
- Industry: Restaurant
- Founded: 1995; 31 years ago
- Founder: George and Peter Lazarides
- Headquarters: Midrand, Gauteng, South Africa
- Number of locations: 200+ (2026)
- Area served: 16 countries
- Key people: Grace Harding (CEO)
- Products: Seafood
- Parent: Ocean Basket Holdings
- Website: za.oceanbasket.com

Ocean Basket is a South African seafood restaurant franchise. As of 2026, the chain operates over 200 locations across 16 countries. Of those restaurants, 125 are in South Africa.

== History ==
Ocean Basket was founded in 1995 by brothers Peter and George Lazarides, and opened its first restaurant in Pretoria, Gauteng.

The group expanded internationally in 2008, by opening its first restaurant in Cyprus.

In 2014, Ocean Basket opened its first restaurant in Greece. After Cyprus, this became the company's second European country of operation. The company was also preparing to open its first store in Kenya. At the time, the group said it was interested in opening stores in Angola, Egypt, Amman, Qatar, and Kuwait.

In May 2016, Ocean Basket began rebranding its corporate identity, including its logo, decor, and menu.

In 2018, the group had 205 outlets across 18 countries, with 33 restaurants situated outside South Africa. Of those, 95% were franchised, with the remainder being company-owned.

In March 2026, the company stated in a media interview that it was exploring opening restaurants in numerous new markets, including Romania, Poland, Bulgaria, Croatia, Singapore, Thailand, Malaysia, Vietnam, and the Philippines.

In June 2026, Ocean Basket launched a platform to facilitate digital ordering, as well as the company's new loyalty program, OB Rewards.

== Operations ==
The company operates using a hybrid model, where some of its stores are franchised, while others are corporate-owned. Its franchises are administered by Ocean Basket Franchise Company (Pty) Ltd.

As of mid-2026, Ocean Basket has over 200 outlets across 16 countries. 125 of those are located in South Africa, with most being in Gauteng.

The company follows a localization strategy, tailoring its menu, decor, and overall restaurant atmosphere to preferences in the various markets in which it operates.

== See also ==
- List of seafood restaurants
