= Seasons and Regions Seafood Grill =

Seafood restaurant in Portland, Oregon, U.S.

- Interactive map of Seasons and Regions Seafood Grill

Restaurant information
- Owner: Greg Schwab
- Chef: Greg Schwab
- Food type: Seafood
- Location: 6660 Southwest Capitol Highway, Portland, Multnomah, Oregon, 97219, United States
- Coordinates: 45.4758°N 122.7050°W
- Website: seasonsandregions.com

Seasons and Regions Seafood Grill is a seafood restaurant in Portland, Oregon, United States.

== Description ==
Seasons and Regions Seafood Grill is a seafood restaurant in southwest Portland's Multnomah neighborhood. The menu includes cioppino, dover sole parmesan, and mustard-and-dill steelhead trout.

== History ==
The restaurant is owned by chef Greg Schwab, who hosts an annual tomato plant sale in the parking lot. In 2020, the restaurant was featured on season 31 of the Food Network's Diners, Drive-Ins and Dives. In 2021, during the COVID-19 pandemic, Seasons and Regions launched an online market with fish, smoked seafood, and Dungeness and artichoke dip, among other products. The restaurant operated via delivery and takeout service during the pandemic, at times.

== Reception ==
In 2015, readers of The Oregonian decided the restaurant offered one of the city's five best happy hours. The restaurant was included in KGW's 2017 list of "5 top spots for seafood in Portland" and Yelp's 2019 list of "Top 100 Places for Brunch". Jenni Moore included Seasons and Regions in Eater Portland's 2021 list of "12 Stellar Portland Seafood Restaurants".

== See also ==
- List of Diners, Drive-Ins and Dives episodes
- List of seafood restaurants
