= Boston Sea Party =

Defunct seafood restaurant chain

- Industry: Restaurant
- Founded: 1976 in Boston
- Fate: All locations closed in the late '90s or early 2000s.
- Headquarters: United States
- Area served: United States
- Products: Seafood

Owned by International Multifoods, Inc., Boston Sea Party was a chain of high-end seafood restaurants that started around 1976 during the U.S. Bicentennial. This special occasion chain had a 1770s theme where waitresses wore floor length, colonial dress with ruffled mop caps. The menu consisted of an all you can eat seafood buffet with an entree choice of lobster, prime rib, New York strip steak or fish. Most U.S. large convention cities enjoyed a Boston Sea Party. In Atlanta, the restaurant was located within the Buckhead community in a historic farmhouse with decor consisting of beautiful stained glass windows (from a former church), wine cellar, and one dining room with old, brick floors. It is unclear when the chain finally closed for good; however, articles seem to indicate the last restaurants open were in the late 1990s or early 2000s. One of these articles, by the Houston Business Journal in December 1994, reports Christmas party deposits lost due to the abrupt closing of the Westheimer location the month before. A related posting, also under this BSP search, is a review of the Houston company, Epic Group. The 2000 posting updates the location as a Molinas restaurant.

== See also ==
- List of seafood restaurants
