= Hoss's Steak and Sea House =

American restaurant chain

Hoss's Steak & Sea House, Inc.
- Trade name: Hoss's Steak and Sea
- Type: Private
- Industry: Restaurants
- Genre: Casual dining
- Founded: 1983; 43 years ago
- Founder: Willard E. Campbell
- Headquarters: Duncansville, Pennsylvania, United States
- Number of locations: 29 (2023)
- Area served: Pennsylvania; West Virginia
- Key people: Willard E. Campbell (CEO and Chairman); Carl Raup (CFO); Billie Walls (Director of Marketing)
- Products: Shareables, Steaks, Chicken, Seafood, Sandwiches, Kids' Menu, Burgers, Sandwiches, Soups, Salads and Desserts
- Revenue: ▲US$300 million (2023)
- Owner: Willard E. Campbell
- Number of employees: 2,200 (2023)
- Website: www.hosss.com

Hoss's Steak & Sea House, Inc., doing business as Hoss's Steak and Sea (commonly known as Hoss's), is a restaurant chain based in Duncansville, Pennsylvania. As of March 2022, the company operates 29 locations in Pennsylvania and single West Virginia location.

== History ==
Hoss's Steak and Sea House was founded in 1983 by Willard E. "Bill" Campbell with the first location in DuBois, Pennsylvania. Today, Campbell still serves as Chairman of the Board and Chief Executive Officer of Hoss's Steak and Sea House and his son, Craig, is the company's planning and development director. His wife, Nancy, has also served as the company's director of public relations for 24 years.

In addition to operating as a restaurant chain, in 1998, Hoss's financed and built a new bathroom and storage facility in Delmont, Pennsylvania through a construction company Hoss's owned.

In 2008, the restaurant chain was named "Best Places to Work in PA" by a group of various Pennsylvania-based organizations, making it the second consecutive year and the fourth time Hoss's has made the list. In 2011, the Hoss's location in Hummelstown was one of the businesses damaged by Tropical Storm Lee, flooded with more than six feet of water and was out of business for eight months.

In March 2013, Hoss's was named the "2013 Chain Operator" in Beef Checkoff Program's 2012 National Foodservice Beef Backer Awards. In May 2014, Hoss's started a White House petition to name May 31 National Steak Day but did not get enough signatures.

== Controversy ==
In 1995, two Hoss's waitresses sued the company after a cook skewered, mutilated and deep-fried a Barbie doll. In the lawsuit, the waitresses recalled the events that took place in September 1994 including accusing the managers of fondling them, employees discussing sexual encounters and obscenities and other sexual and inappropriate behavior. They accused the restaurant of not regularly changing the cooking oil including after the Barbie doll incident. One of the waitresses also accused a manager of demoting and eventually firing her after she complained. The lawsuit went to trial in federal court in 1998 and, according to a 2000 book, the jury ruled in favor of Hoss's though other details about the case have not been found.

In 2007, Hoss's received significant attention from state and international news sources after an E. coli outbreak from the restaurant's meat supplier sickened several people at different locations. As a result, the meat supplier, HFX, recalled 259,230 lbs. of meat as a precaution.

== Design ==
The restaurant has received news coverage for its walls decorated with antique American newspapers, photos and objects, especially those local to the area including an Erie newspaper's front-page story of Victory over Japan Day in 1945. The original architectural design was done by Donald R. Langer, A.I.A., P.E. of Altoona, Pennsylvania.

== See also ==
- List of seafood restaurants
