= Seafood restaurant =

Restaurant mostly serving fish from the sea

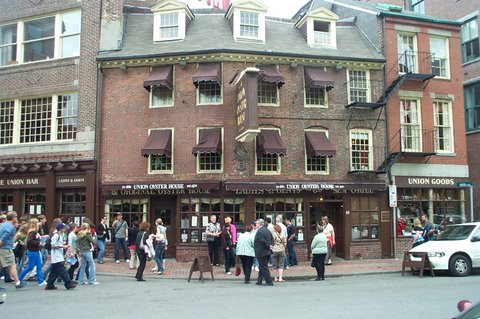
Union Oyster House exterior in Boston is one of the oldest continuously open restaurants in the United States.

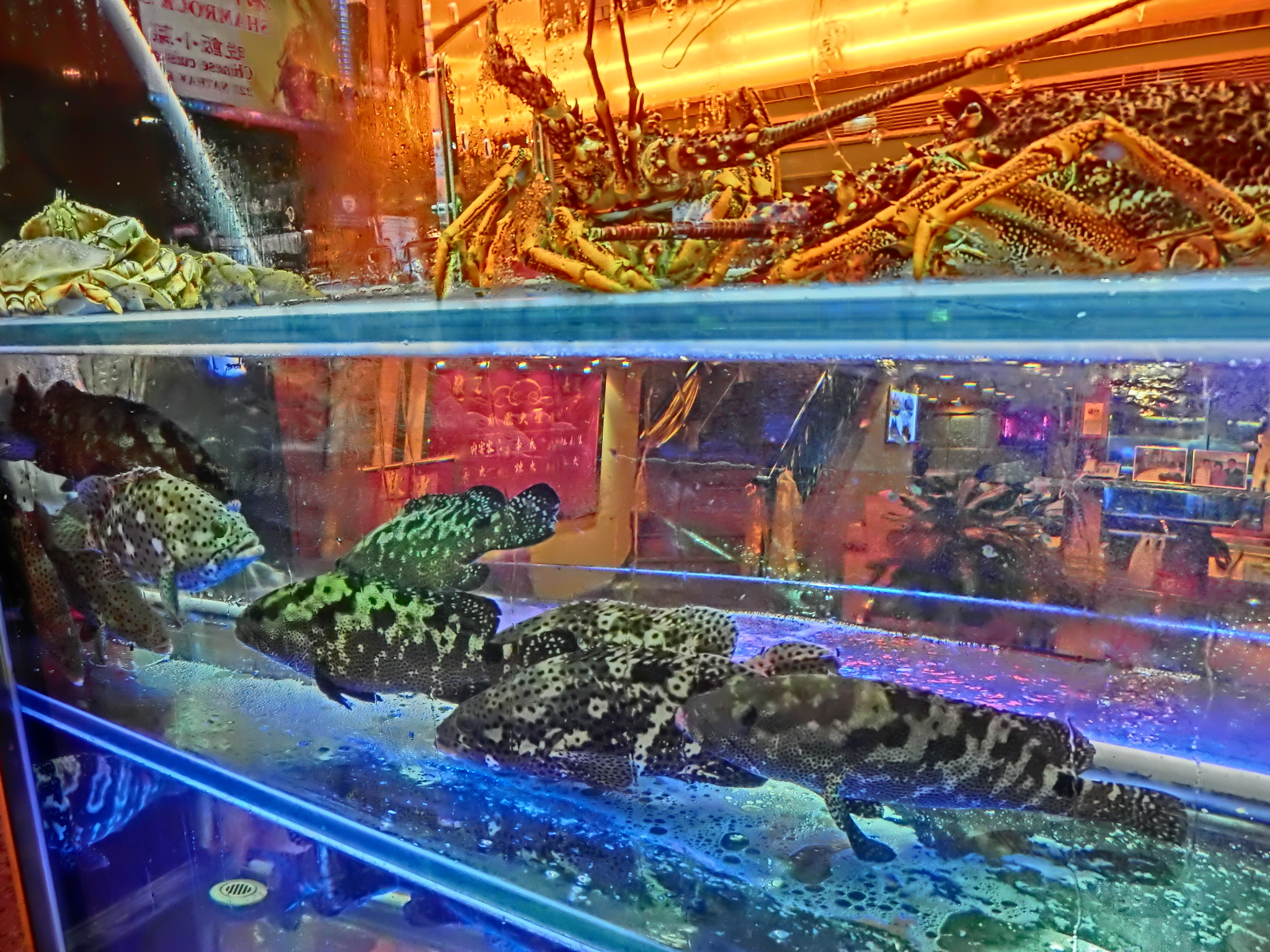
Fish and lobster at the Shamrock Hotel seafood restaurant in Nathan Road, Jordan, Hong Kong

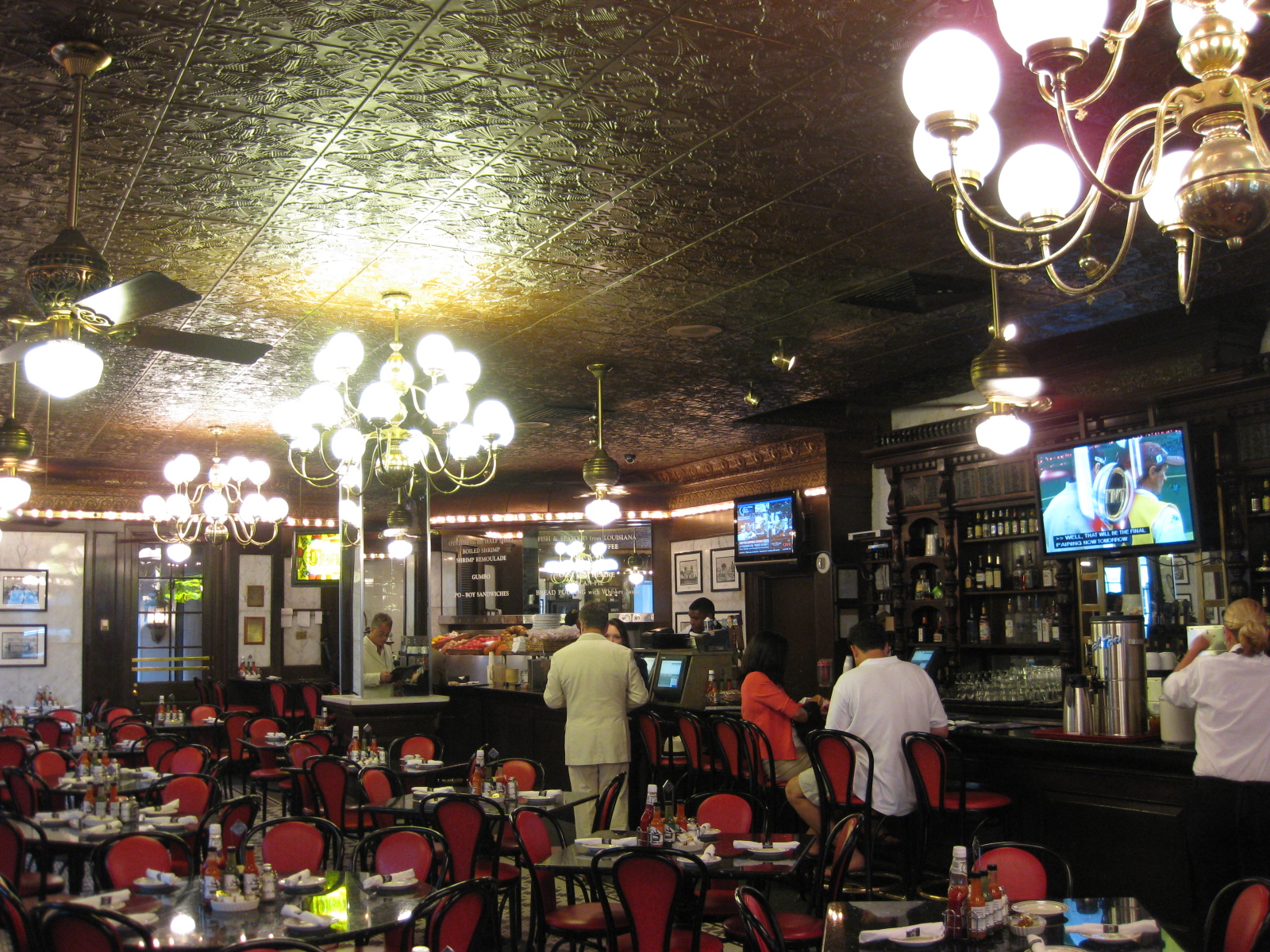
The interior of Desire Oyster Bar in French Quarter, New Orleans, Louisiana

A seafood restaurant is a restaurant that specializes in seafood cuisine and seafood dishes, such as fish and shellfish. Dishes may include freshwater fish. The concept may focus upon the preparation and service of fresh seafood, (as opposed to frozen products). Some seafood restaurants also provide retail sales of seafood that consumers take home to prepare. Seafood restaurants may have a marine-themed decor, with decorations such as fish nets, nautical images and buoys. Fare can vary due to seasonality in fish availability and in the fishing industry. Seafood restaurants may offer additional non-seafood items, such as chicken and beef dishes.

== Types ==
Upscale and midscale seafood restaurants may offer more selections compared to quick-service restaurants. Some are located nearby or on a waterfront.

== Fare ==
Fare in seafood restaurants may include fresh and frozen fish, shellfish, crawfish, shrimp, crab, lobster, mussels and oysters. Some have a raw bar area where raw shellfish products are prepared, such as raw oysters.

== See also ==
- Calabash, North Carolina – Dubbed the "Seafood Capital of the World" because of the town's offering of "Calabash-style" seafood restaurants
- Cantonese seafood restaurants typically use a large dining room layout, have ornate designs, and specialize in seafood such as expensive Chinese-style lobsters, crabs, prawns, clams, and oysters, all kept live in fish tanks until preparation.
- Gampo-eup – An eup or a town of Gyeongju in South Korea, Gampo Harbor has over 240 seafood restaurants.
- George – An American lobster owned briefly by the City Crab and Seafood restaurant in New York City. Captured in December 2008, he was released back into the wild in January 2009. George weighed 20 pounds (9.1 kg), and had an estimated age of 140 years.
- List of barbecue restaurants
- List of fish and chip restaurants
- List of fish dishes
- List of oyster bars
- List of seafood dishes
- List of seafood restaurants
- List of sushi restaurants
- Lists of restaurants
- National Federation of Fish Friers – British trade association
- National Fisheries Institute – Member companies consist of all levels of business involved in seafood, from fishing vessel operators to seafood restaurants
- Steakhouse – Restaurant specializing in steaks
