= List of oyster bars =

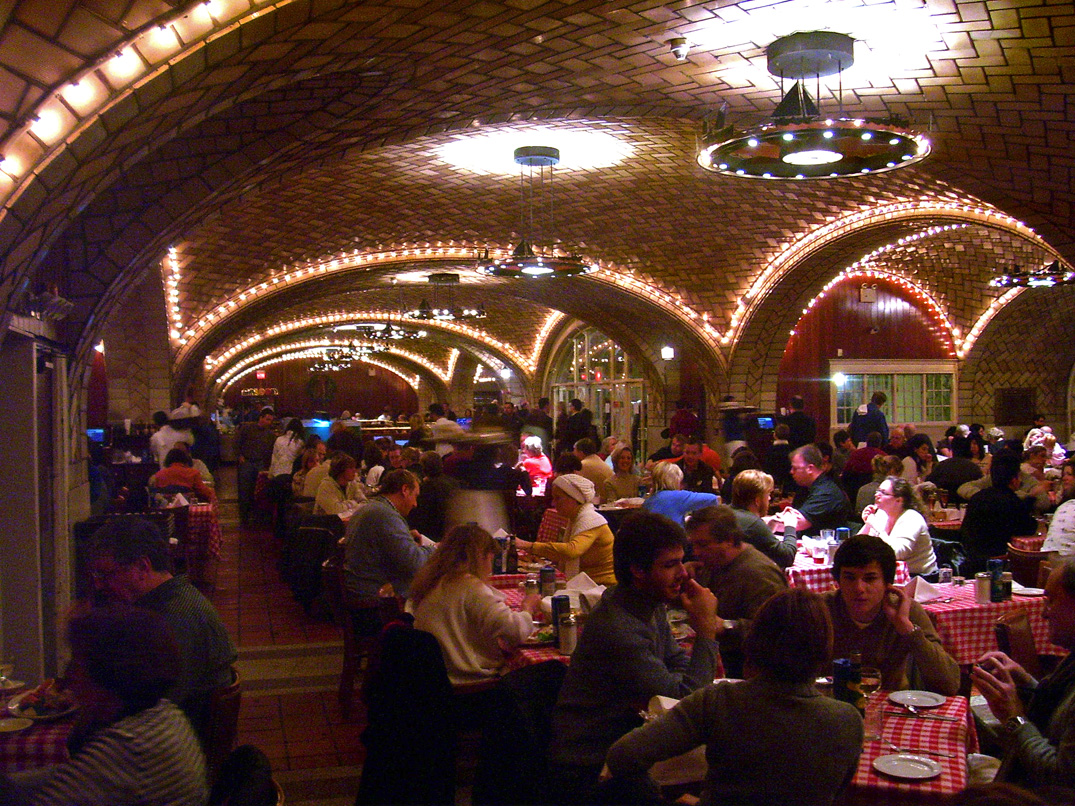
Oyster Bar in New York City, 2006

This is a list of notable oyster bars. An oyster bar is a restaurant specializing in serving oysters, or a section of a restaurant which serves oysters buffet-style. In France, the oyster bar is known as bar à huîtres. Oysters have been consumed since ancient times and were common tavern food in Europe, but the oyster bar as a distinct restaurant began making an appearance in the 1700s.

== United Kingdom ==
- Loch Fyne Restaurants – a chain of 25 seafood restaurants in the United Kingdom

=== England ===
- Bentley's Oyster Bar and Grill
- Sinclair's Oyster Bar – Cathedral Gates, Millennium Quarter, Shambles Square, Manchester city centre, Manchester, England

== United States ==
=== California ===
- 72 Market Street Oyster Bar and Grill – a former oyster bar and restaurant in Venice, California
- Swan Oyster Depot – in San Francisco, California

=== District of Columbia ===
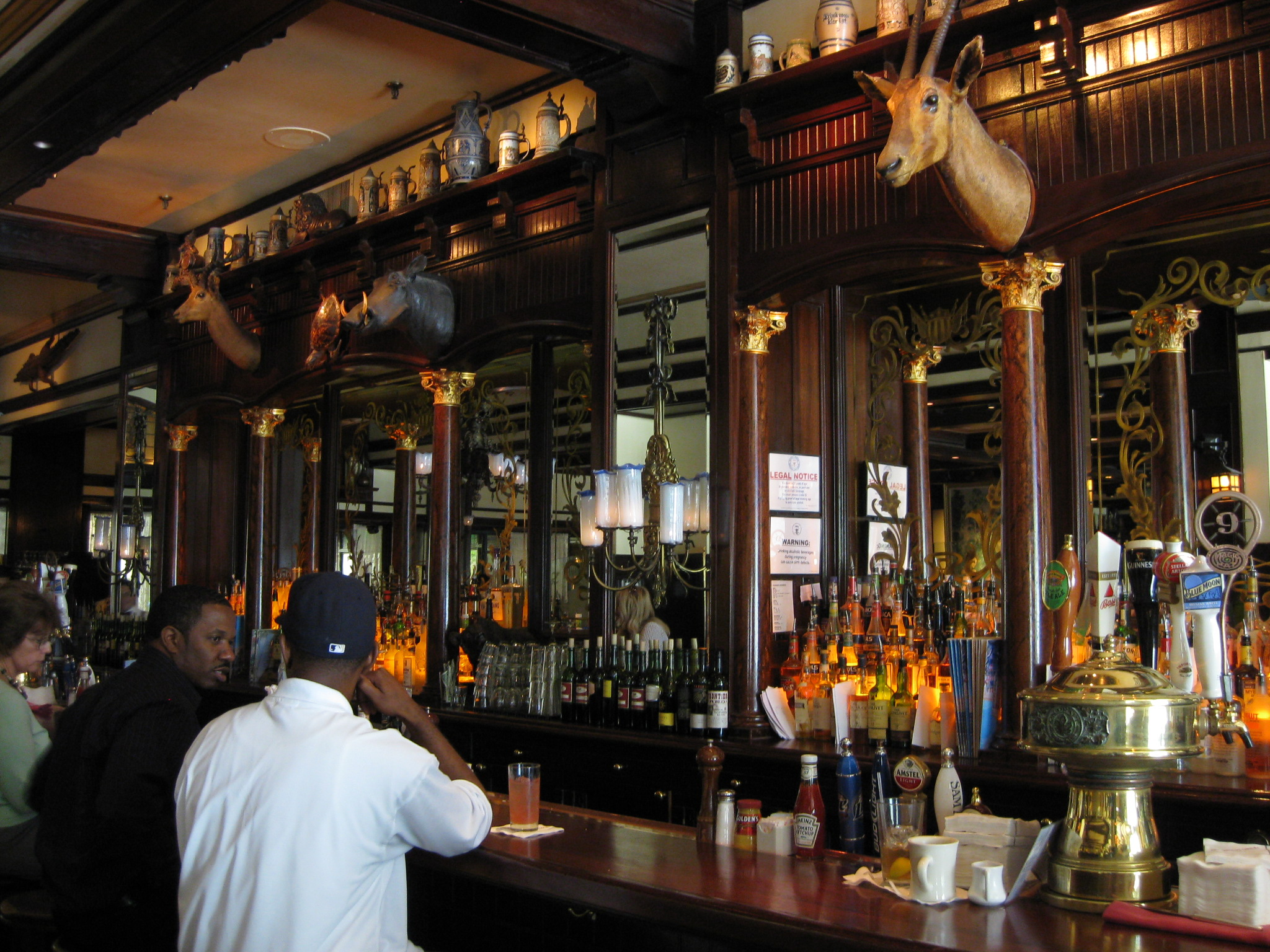
The mahogany bar at Old Ebbitt Grill

- Hank's Oyster Bar – multiple locations in Washington, D.C., and Alexandria, Virginia
- Old Ebbitt Grill – a historic bar and restaurant located in Washington, D.C.; holds an annual oyster eating event called Oyster Riot every November

=== Florida ===
- Shuckum's Oyster Bar – a former restaurant located on Young Circle in downtown Hollywood, Florida

=== Louisiana ===
- Arnaud's – the largest restaurant in New Orleans

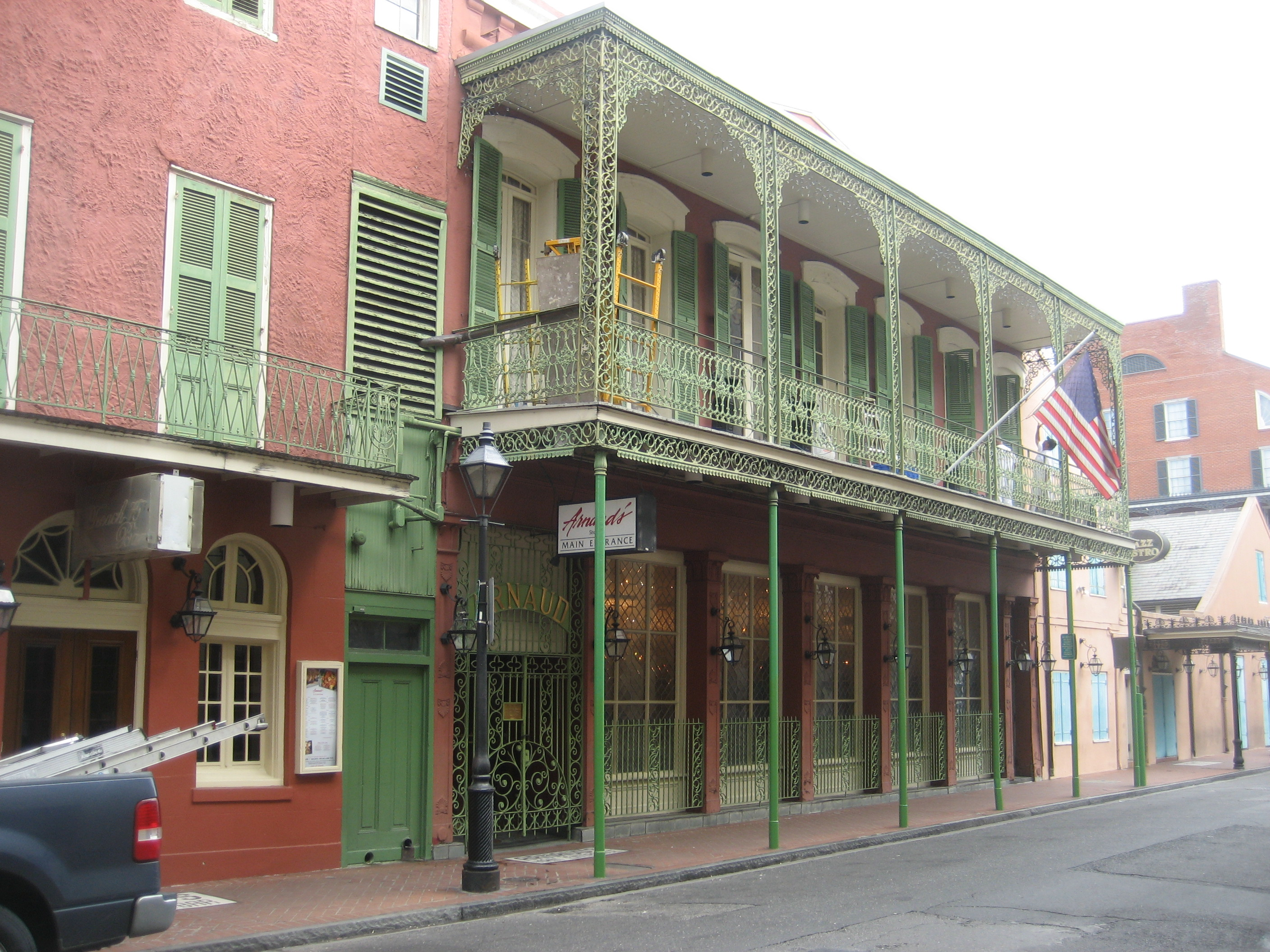
Arnaud's, exterior view, 2009

=== Massachusetts ===
- Union Oyster House, in Boston, Massachusetts, one of the oldest restaurants in America.

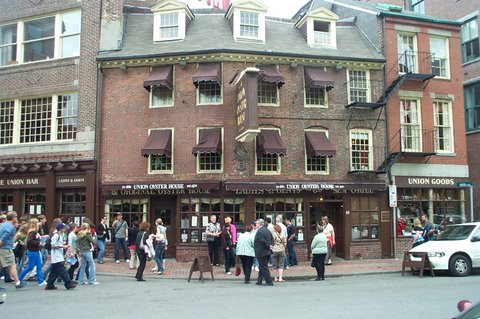
Union Oyster House exterior in Boston, Massachusetts, one of the oldest restaurants in America

=== New York ===
- Grand Central Oyster Bar & Restaurant, a seafood restaurant located on the lower level of Grand Central Terminal at 42nd Street and Vanderbilt Avenue in Manhattan in New York City
- John Dory Oyster Bar – Manhattan, New York City
- Mermaid Oyster Bar – in Greenwich Village, New York City opened by Zach Braff
- Maison premiere, an oyster bar and cocktail restaurant opened in 2011, located in Williamsburg, Brooklyn. The restaurant is known for its oyster selection, absinthe program, and interior inspired by nineteenth-century New Orleans.

=== North Carolina ===
- Sunny Side Inn – a historic oyster bar located at Williamston, Martin County, North Carolina

=== Oregon ===
- Câche Câche
- Dan and Louis Oyster Bar – a seafood restaurant in Portland, Oregon described by Fodor's as a "Portland landmark"
- Eat: An Oyster Bar
- Flying Fish Company
- McCormick & Schmick's – an American seafood restaurant chain, based in Portland, Oregon

=== Pennsylvania ===
- Old Original Bookbinder's and Bookbinder's 15th Street - old Philadelphia seafood restaurants (dating to 1893), now both closed.
- The Oyster House - 2026 James Beard Foundation Award Classics: Mid-Atlantic Award winner (established in 1947)

=== Virginia ===
- Old Original Bookbinder's – Richmond, Virginia - expansion from Philadelphia.

=== Washington ===
- Coastal Kitchen, Seattle
- Emmett Watson's Oyster Bar – located in Seattle, Washington's Pike Place Market
- The Walrus and the Carpenter, Seattle

== Gallery ==
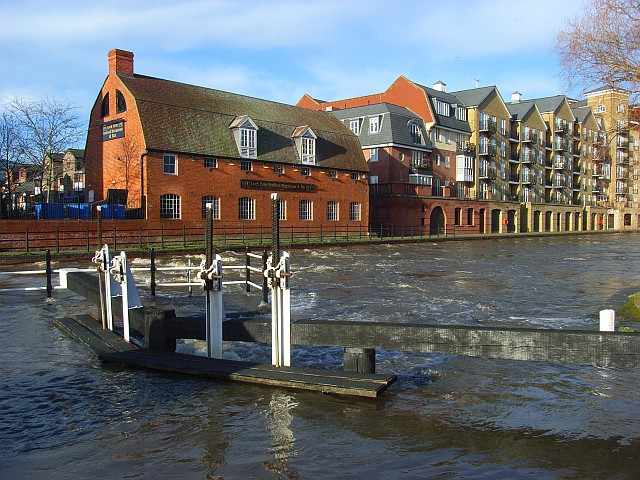
The Loch Fyne restaurant in Reading, Berkshire, England, is in a former brewery building by the River Kennet.

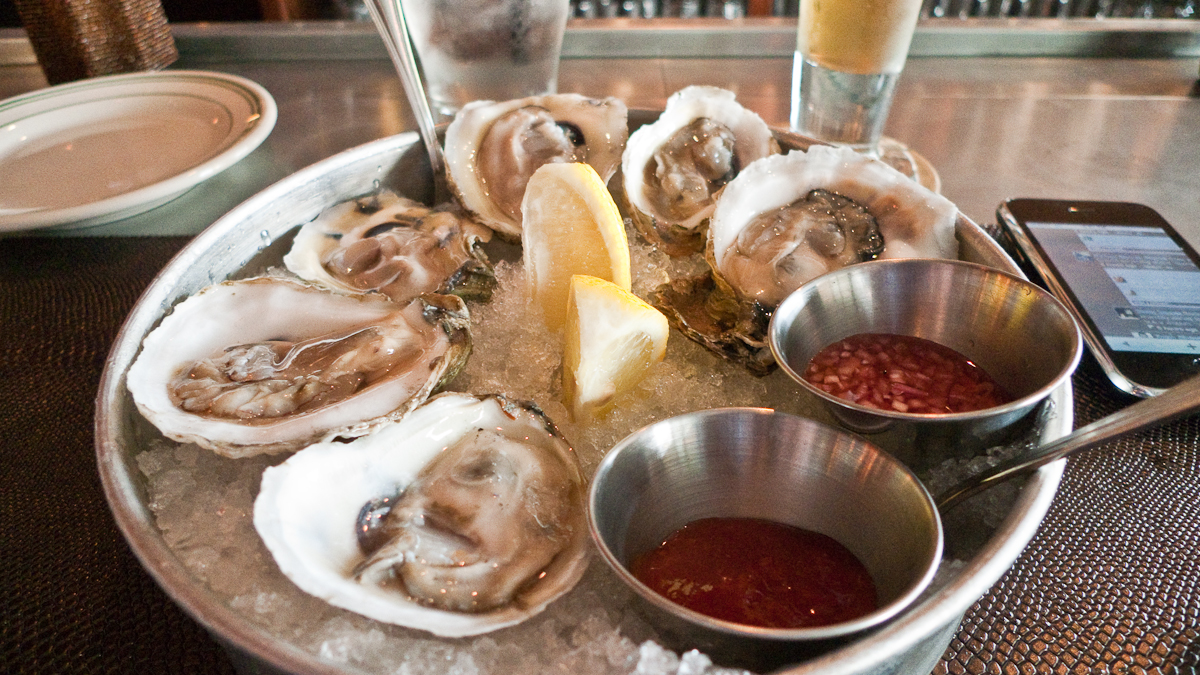
Raw oysters on the half-shell served with cocktail sauce and mignonette sauce

== See also ==
- List of seafood restaurants
- Lists of restaurants
- Raw bar

== Bibliography ==
- Williams, Nicola. France. London: Lonely Planet, 2009.
