= Southport Raw Bar =

Restaurant in Fort Lauderdale, Florida

Coordinates: 26.1024°N 80.1303°W

Southport Raw Bar is a restaurant and raw bar in Fort Lauderdale, Florida.

== Description ==
Southport Raw Bar is located on the Fort Lauderdale waterfront near Port Everglades. As a raw bar, the restaurant primarily sells shellfish, especially oysters.

== History ==
Southport Raw Bar was founded by Milton Kirtman and Carmine Ferrante in 1973. The restaurant became known for catering to local boaters. In 1985 a second location was opened in Pompano Beach, Florida, with the owners describing the location as being "more upscale" than the Fort Lauderdale location. That location was briefly the subject of controversy when, after a series of noise complaints, the city heavily restricted the playing of music at restaurants. Under the law, Southport Raw Bar was essentially banned from playing any music outside, even the radio. The ban was lifted the following year.

In the 1990s, Buddy Sherman became a part-owner of the restaurant. Sherman had worked at the restaurant since 1979, starting as the restaurant's first busboy. During the same period the restaurant underwent renovations to add a patio overlooking the Lauderdale Marina. In 2017, the restaurant was praised in the Sun Sentinel for supporting a former waitress with food deliveries. Shortly before the COVID-19 pandemic, the restaurant acquired a liquor license and began revamping its menu. The company stayed open during the pandemic in order to be able to keep paying employees.

== Reception ==
Southport Raw Bar has received positive reception among critics. It has received positive reviews locally from the Miami Herald and the Sun Sentinel. It received positive reviews in Thrillist and Tasting Table.
