= Flying Fish Company =

Seafood company based in Portland, Oregon, U.S.

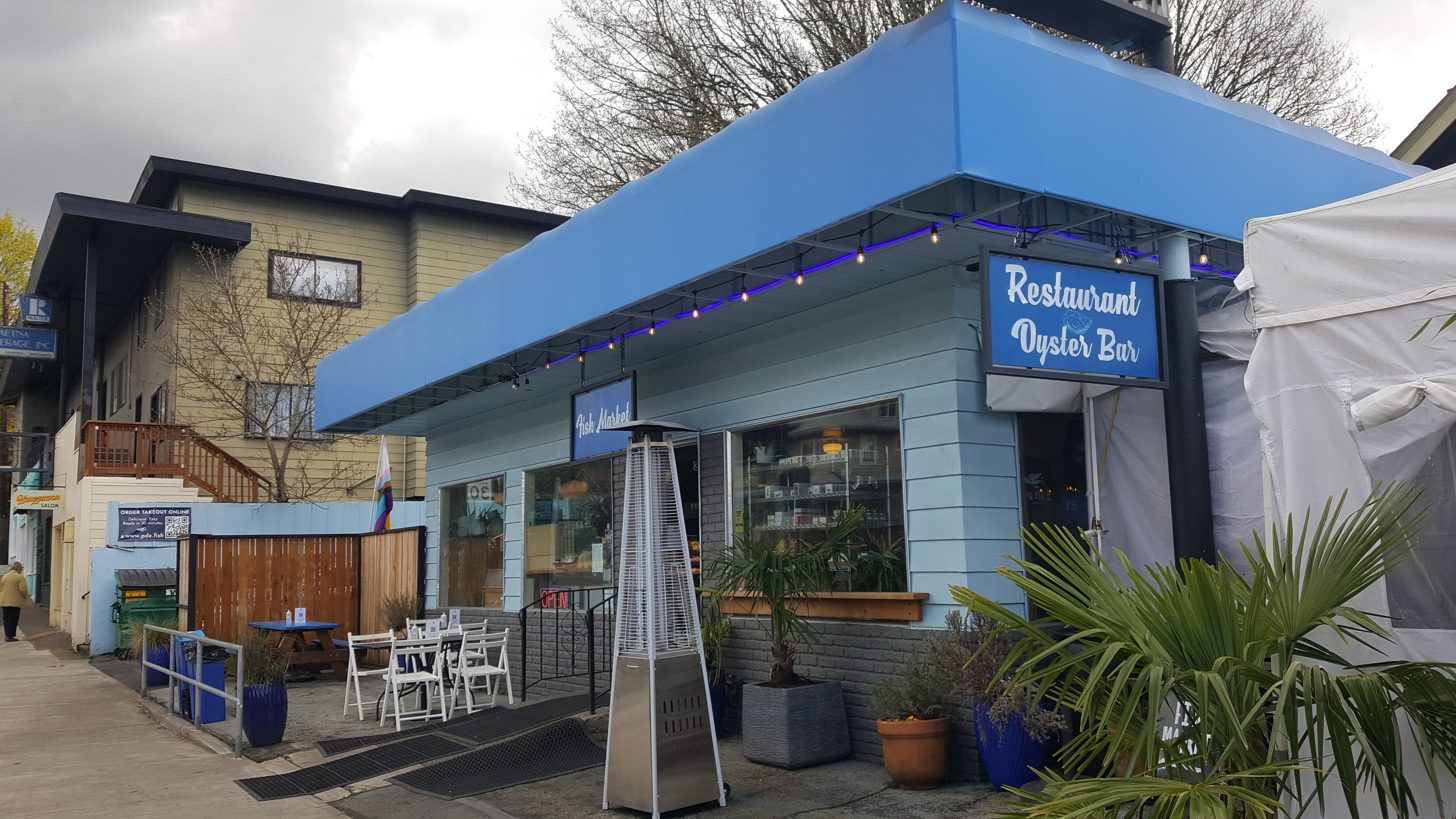
- Interactive map of Flying Fish Company

Restaurant information
- Owner: Lyf Gildersleeve
- Food type: Seafood
- Location: 3004 East Burnside Street, Portland, Multnomah, Oregon, 97214, United States
- Coordinates: 45.5227°N 122.6347°W
- Website: flyingfishpdx.com

Flying Fish Company is a sustainable seafood company which operates a fish market, restaurant, and food cart in Portland, Oregon.

== Description and history ==
Lyf Gildersleeve is the owner of Flying Fish Company, which began as a food cart on Division Street in southeast Portland c. 2010. Following a relocation in 2011, the business began serving fish, meats, and "other sustainably-sourced food products out of a small shack on Southeast Hawthorne Boulevard and a truck in Multnomah Village". In 2015, the company launched a Kickstarter campaign, seeking to raise $50,000 "for a bigger warehouse space in Southeast Portland and a small oyster bar and retail spot along Northeast Sandy Boulevard in the upcoming Providore Fine Foods". The goal was achieved in August. The company began operating an 8-seat oyster bar in 2016, initially serving three types of oysters, smoked salmon, soup (seafood and meat), bone broth, wine, microbrews, and cider. The bar also served roasted whole chicken.

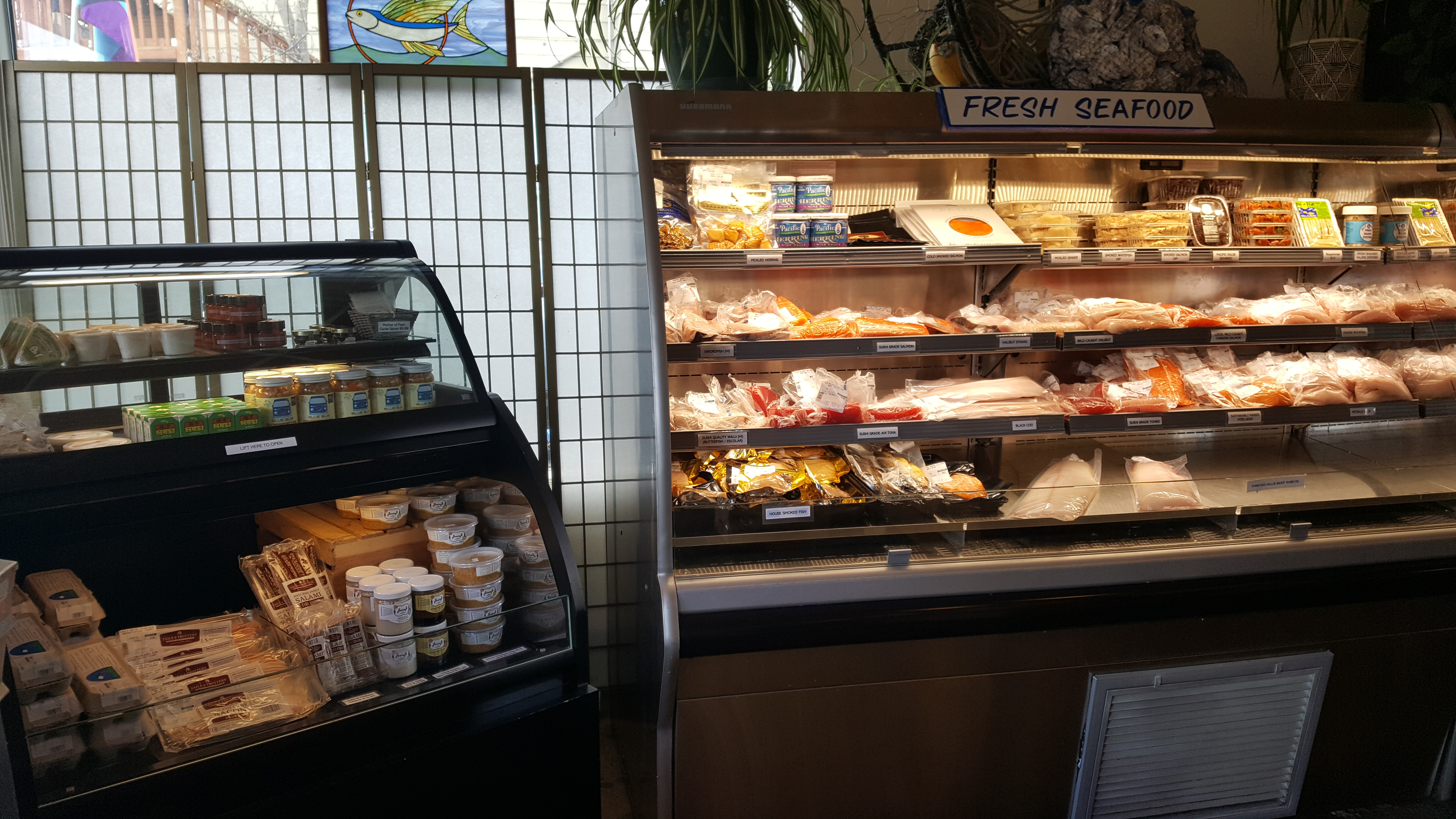
The market's interior, 2022

In late 2019, Flying Fish announced plans to expand by opening a brick and mortar seafood market on East Burnside Street, in the southeast Portland part of the Kerns neighborhood. Gildersleeve said the company would be leaving Providore Fine Foods in late December. Michael Russell of The Oregonian wrote, "The fast-casual, family-friendly restaurant will serve a seasonal menu including fish and chips, fish sandwiches, grilled salmon salad, clam chowder, cioppino, steamed clams and mussels, Hawaiian-inspired poke, ceviche and freshly shucked oysters on the half shell to seats both indoors and out. A full-service bar will pour wine, beer, and spirits from the Pacific Northwest. Expect allergen-free dishes and gluten-free fish & chips as well as keto and paleo menu options." In January 2020, the company announced an opening date of February 10.

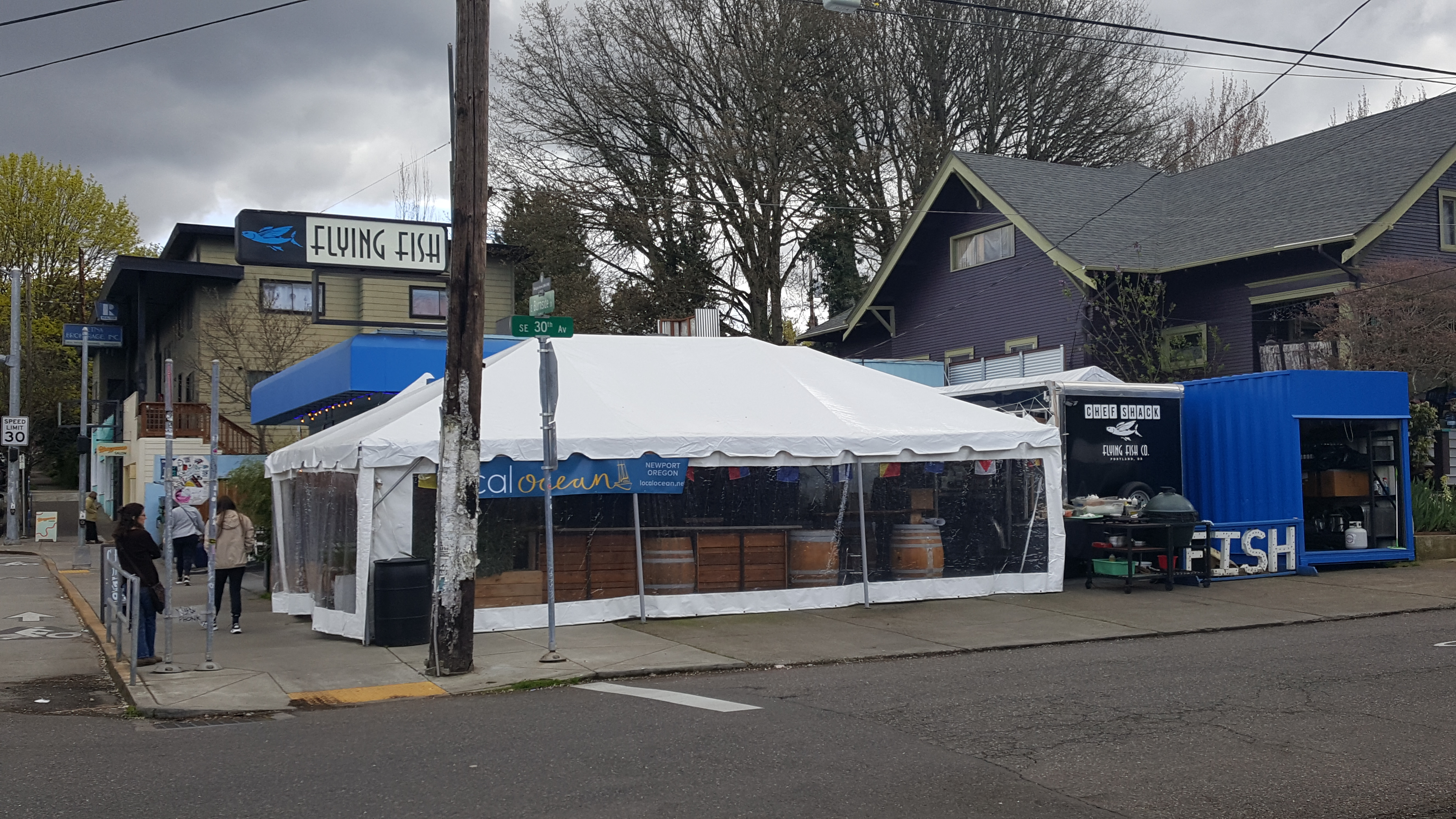
Exterior of the market, restaurant, and food cart ChefShack, 2022

The 17-seat restaurant has an outdoor fire pit and picnic tables. According to Portland Monthly, "The restaurant was inspired by the hybrid seafood market and fish and chips shop his family owned when he was growing up in the late 80s and early 90s, taking bits and pieces from seafood restaurants he admired up and down the West Coast and around the world." In January 2022, Gildersleeve opened a food cart on the Burnside restaurant's patio called ChefShack. Andi Prewitt of Willamette Week wrote, "The new kitchen is meant to complement the existing menu of cod, steelhead and salmon in everything from tacos to sandwiches to burgers—as well as the popular daily selection of shucked oysters. And in an unusual move, there will be a rotating cast of people helming the outdoor kitchen, the first of whom is Trever Gilbert (formerly of Departure and RingSide Fish House)." The menu includes ceviche, glass-noodle salad, carrots and cashews in yellow curry, oysters, and arroz con coco (sticky rice, raisins, chiles, and chocolate).

Following "a few weeks of robust sales", the restaurant closed temporarily because of the COVID-19 pandemic. In November, six heaters were stolen. In 2023, Flying Fish hosted a shucking competition in which members of the public could challenge staff. The business has been a vendor at the Portland Night Market.

== Reception ==
In 2022, Jenni Moore and Nathan Williams included Flying Fish in Eater Portland's overview of "Where to Find Stellar Seafood in Portland".

== See also ==
- List of oyster bars
- List of seafood restaurants
