= Old Original Bookbinder's =

Philadelphia seafood restaurant

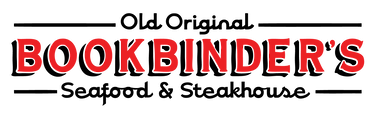

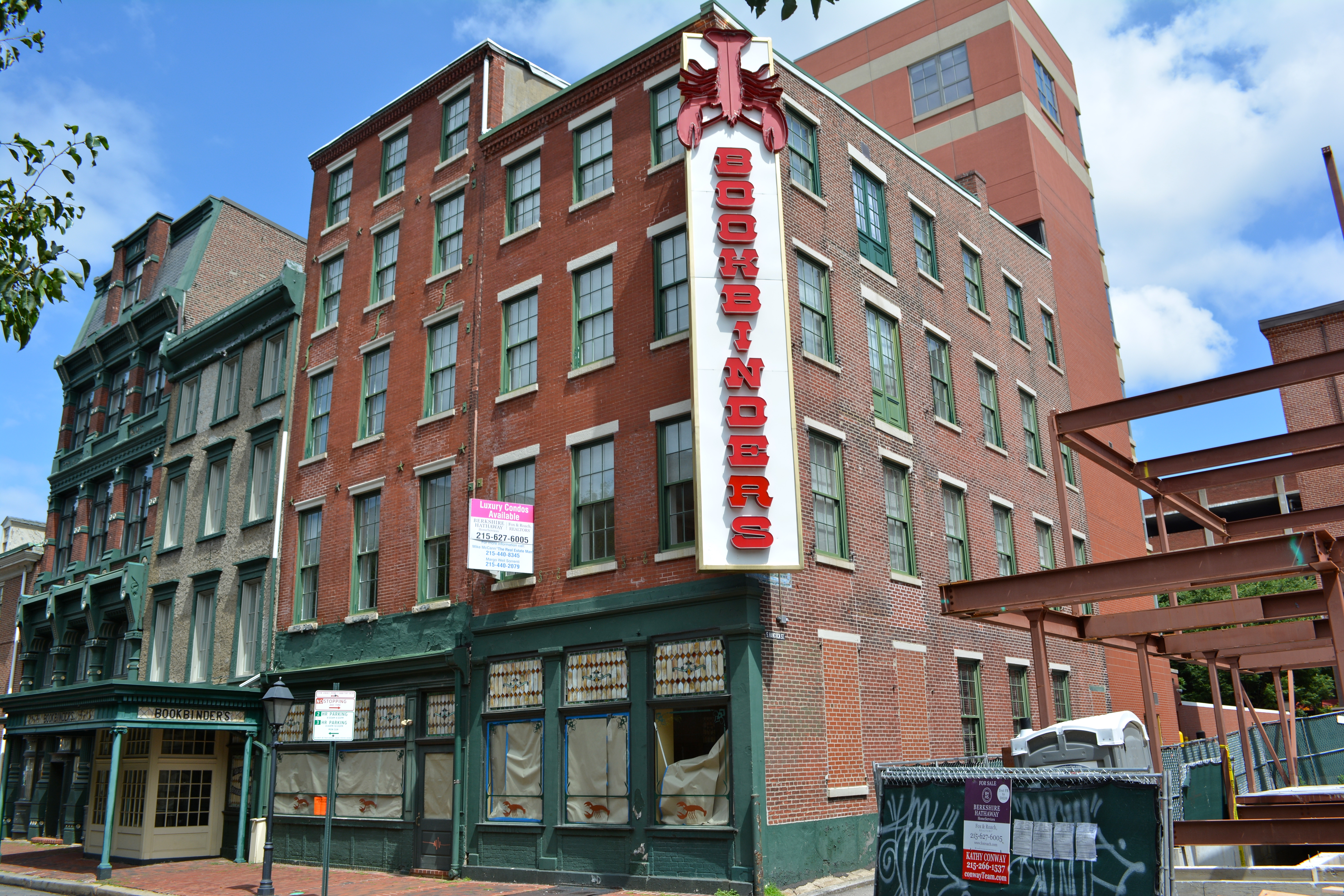
- The exterior of Bookbinder's, as seen from Walnut St., in 2014.

Restaurant information
- Established: 1893
- Closed: 2009
- Location: Philadelphia, Pennsylvania, United States
- Coordinates: 39.9469°N 75.1438°W
- Other locations: Richmond, Virginia

Old Original Bookbinder's was a seafood restaurant at 125 Walnut Street in Philadelphia. It was known for its lobsters and its Bookbinder's soup.

The restaurant was decorated with bas-reliefs of U.S. Presidents on its stained-glass façade and the Gettysburg Address written in bronze near the front door. The lobby held the world's largest indoor lobster tank; it could accommodate up to 500 lobsters.

== History ==
The restaurant's history can be traced to the oyster saloon opened in 1893 on Fifth Street near South Street by Dutch-Jewish immigrant Samuel Bookbinder. In 1898, Bookbinder moved it to Second and Walnut streets to be closer to the docks.

The restaurant left the family in the 1930s when it was bequeathed to the Jewish Federated Charities. John M. Taxin, the last owner's grandson, bought it with partners Hyman B. Sichel and Jimmy Retana in 1945, according to city records. A few years later, after buying out his partners, Taxin added "Old Original" to differentiate it from Bookbinders Seafood House, which two of Samuel Bookbinder's grandsons opened in 1935 on 15th Street near Locust. (The 15th Street restaurant closed in 2004.)

During World War II and the Korean War, when young men were sworn into the military at the Customs House a block away, Taxin offered free lunches to the recruits, who spread the word about the offer. He also promoted the myth that the restaurant's origin was 1865. Until he retired in the 1980s, he ran Bookbinder's with his son, Albert Taxin.

Albert Taxin died of a brain tumor in 1993, and his son, John E., took it over with Albert's sister, Sandy. John M. Taxin died in 1997 at age 90.

John E. Taxin closed the restaurant for renovations just after New Year's Day 2002. After a $4.5-million renovation that added condominiums, a downsized version opened in early 2005. In 2006, less than 16 months later, the restaurant filed for protection under Chapter 11 of the U.S. Bankruptcy Code. At a hearing on April 29, 2009, Judge Eric L. Frank agreed with most creditors and the U.S. trustee that converting the case to Chapter 7 – liquidating its assets under court supervision – would not be productive because of the high administrative costs.

Old Original Bookbinder's bankruptcy petition was dismissed on April 29, 2009. Creditors, owed about $1.8 million, had to find a way outside of U.S. Bankruptcy Court to seek reimbursement. In April 2009, John E. Taxin closed the restaurant. Albert A. Ciardi III, the restaurant's bankruptcy attorney, said in May 2009 that two interested parties had come forward in the previous month, but that no sale had taken place.

The historical location was reopened on January 9, 2015, by Chef Jose Garces and the Garces Group. Renamed the Olde Bar, the restaurant was transformed into a mix of seafood saloon and private catering space.

In late 2017 and early 2018, Garces Group was sued for payment by vendors, investors, and a landlord, indicating financial trouble. News reports indicate that Garces wanted to have the group declare bankruptcy, but the original investors objected. After significant legal wrangling where Garces' lawyers divided his share of Garces Group into separate entities with voting rights to outnumber the investors' votes, Garces Restaurant Group filed for bankruptcy in Camden, NJ in May 2018. Ultimately, Garces Group was acquired by Louisiana-based hospitality company Ballard Brands in a sale that was approved by the bankruptcy court in July 2018. Ballard Brands continues to operate the Olde Bar.

The Bookbinder's name and much of the historical woodwork and décor remain and have been restored.

== Additional location ==
- Richmond, Virginia

== See also ==
- List of oyster bars
