= Sunny Side Inn =

- U.S. National Register of Historic Places
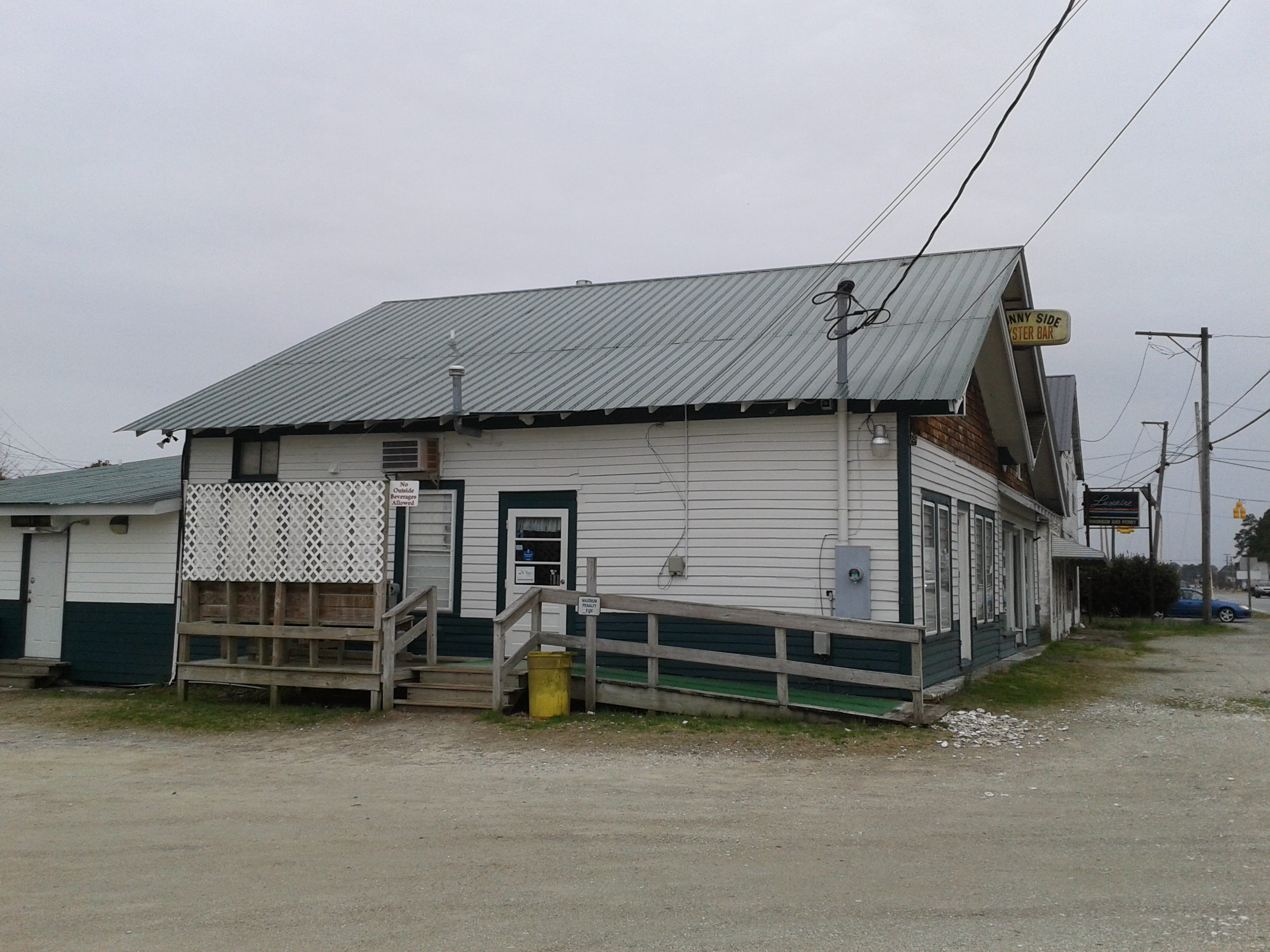
- Sunny Side Inn, March, 2015

- Location within North Carolina Location within the United States
- Location: 1102 Washington St., Williamston, North Carolina
- Coordinates: 35°50′32″N 77°3′47″W
- Area: less than one acre
- Built: 1929, 1930-1931, 1935-1940
- Architectural style: Bungalow/craftsman
- NRHP reference No.: 95001396
- Added to NRHP: November 29, 1995

Sunny Side Inn, also known as the Sunny Side Oyster Bar, is a historic oyster bar located at Williamston, Martin County, North Carolina. The original section was built in 1929 as a one-story, gable front frame building housing the Sanitary Service Market. It was enlarged in 1930–1931 with the addition of a front gable room for a lunch room and a rear addition housing the oyster bar was built between 1935 and 1940. The building is sheathed in weatherboard and has American Craftsman-style exposed roof rafters.

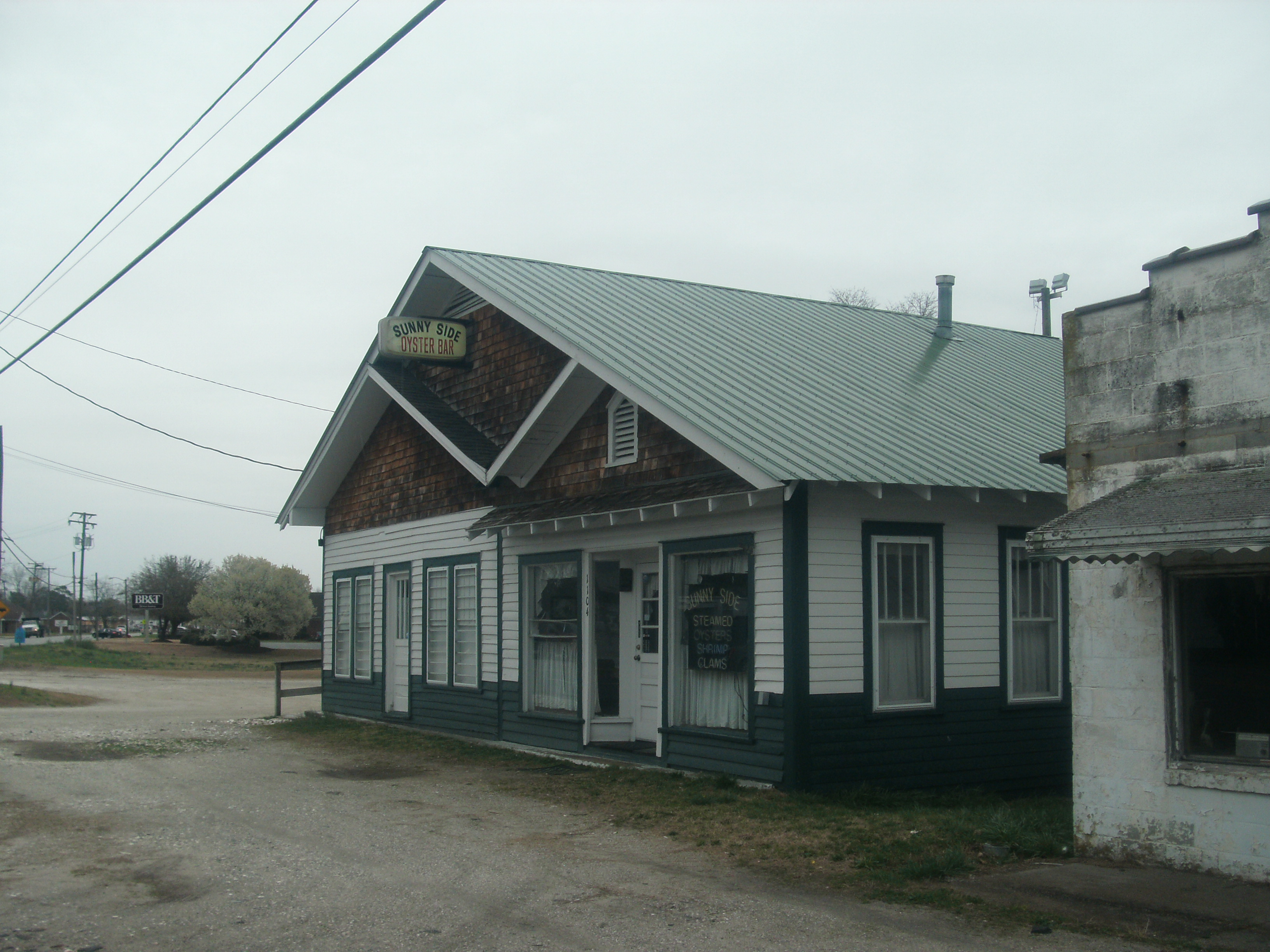
Front of the building

It was listed on the National Register of Historic Places in 1995.

== See also ==
- List of oyster bars
