= Plateau de fruits de mer =

French seafood dish

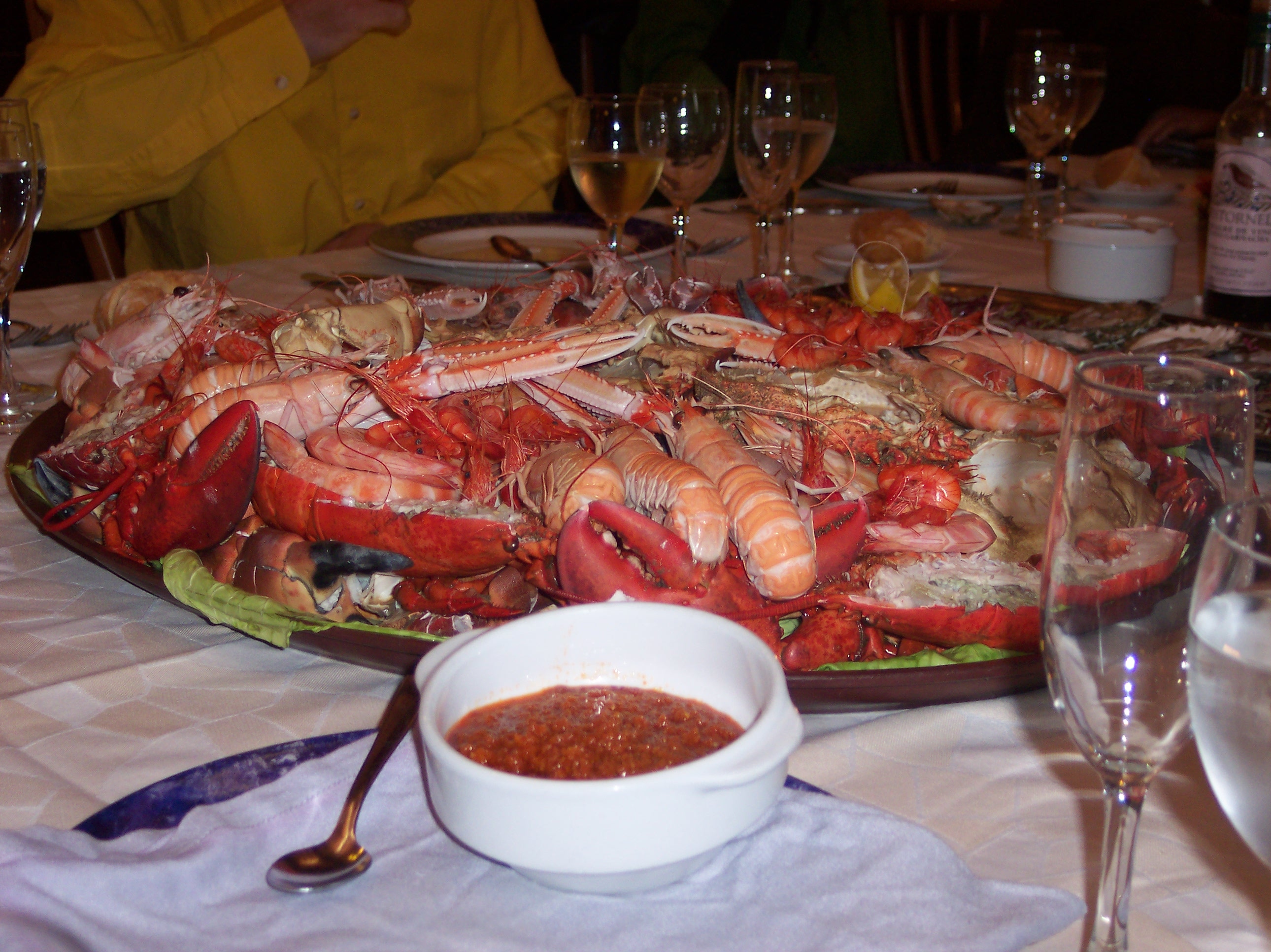
A Galician plateau de fruits de mer

A plateau de fruits de mer (French for 'shellfish platter') is a seafood dish of raw and cooked shellfish served cold on a platter, usually on a bed of ice.

A plateau de fruits de mer generally consists entirely of shellfish and is served with condiments such as mignonette sauce, cocktail sauce, and lemon.

== Service ==
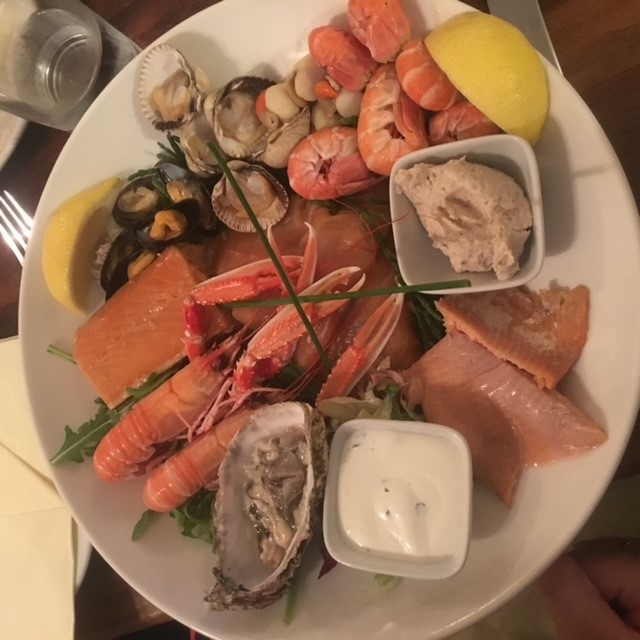
Scottish seafood platter

The serving platter is often held above table level by a stand, and sometimes can contain multiple, elaborate tiers. This is both for visual effect, and because the shellfish are often served in the shell, or on the half shell, which causes them to take up a large area while containing only a bite or two of meat. It can alternatively be served on a bed of seaweed (vraic).

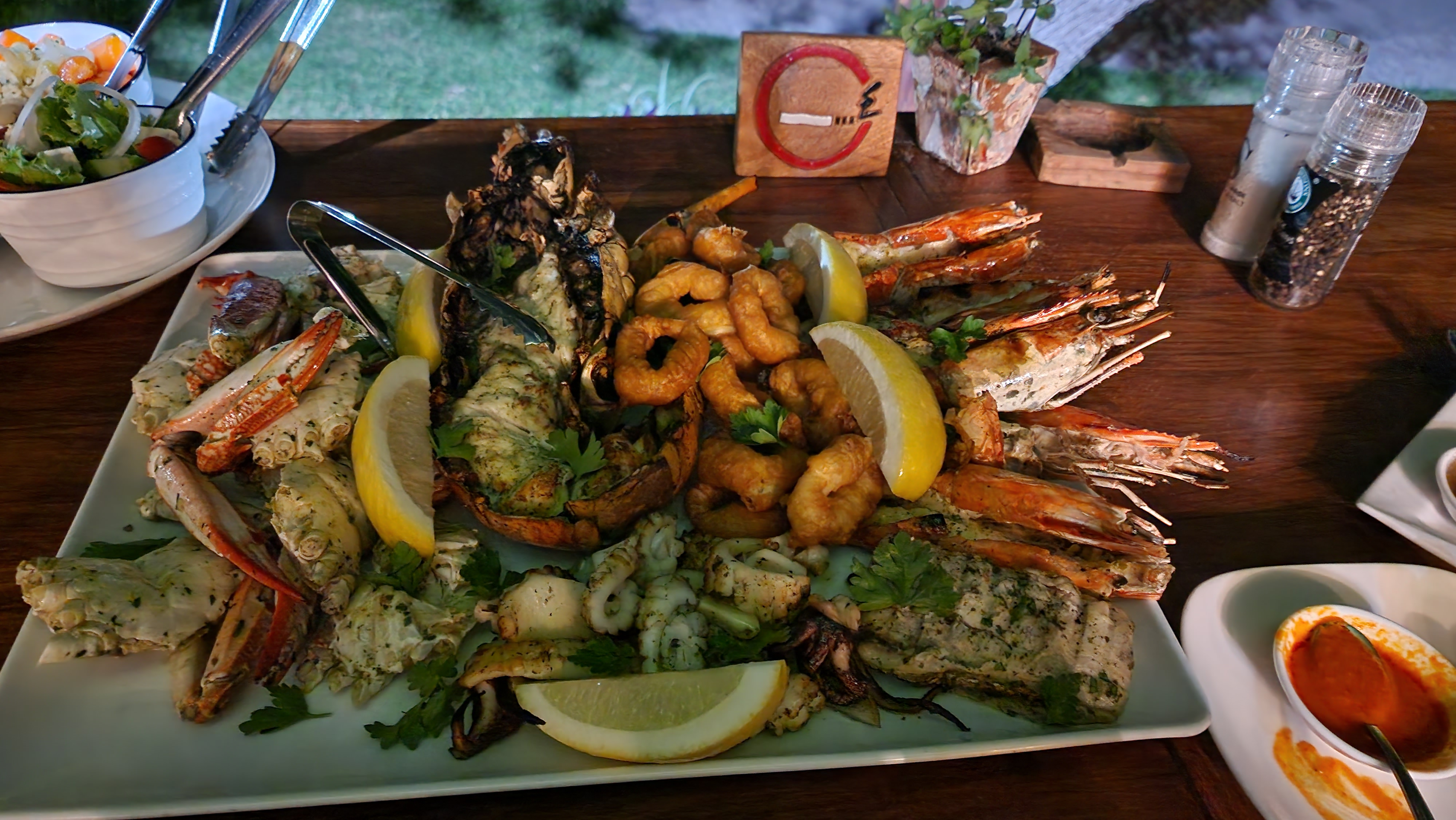
An African take on the tradition, all cooked due to food hygiene

== Shellfish ==
A plateau de fruits de mer may include:

- Oysters
- Shrimp
- Lobster
- Periwinkle
- Crab
- Prawns
- Langoustine
- Mussels
- Scallops
- Clams

== See also ==
- List of seafood dishes
- List of fish dishes
- Raw bar
