= The Walrus and the Carpenter (restaurant) =

Restaurant in Seattle, Washington, U.S.

- Interactive map of The Walrus and the Carpenter

Restaurant information
- Established: 2010
- Food type: Seafood
- Location: 4743 Ballard Avenue NW, Seattle, Washington, 98107, United States
- Coordinates: 47°39′48.8″N 122°22′48.3″W

The Walrus and the Carpenter is a restaurant and oyster bar in Seattle's Ballard neighborhood, in the U.S. state of Washington.

== Description ==
The woman-owned restaurant's interior has a large chandelier. The menu features seafood, especially oysters.

== History ==
Renee Erickson opened the restaurant in 2010.

== Reception ==
In 2022, The Walrus and the Carpenter received a James Beard Foundation Award nomination in the Outstanding Restaurant category, and was named one of the city's best seafood restaurants by Seattle Metropolitan.

== See also ==
- List of oyster bars
- List of restaurants in Seattle
- List of seafood restaurants
