= Raw bar =

Place serving seafood

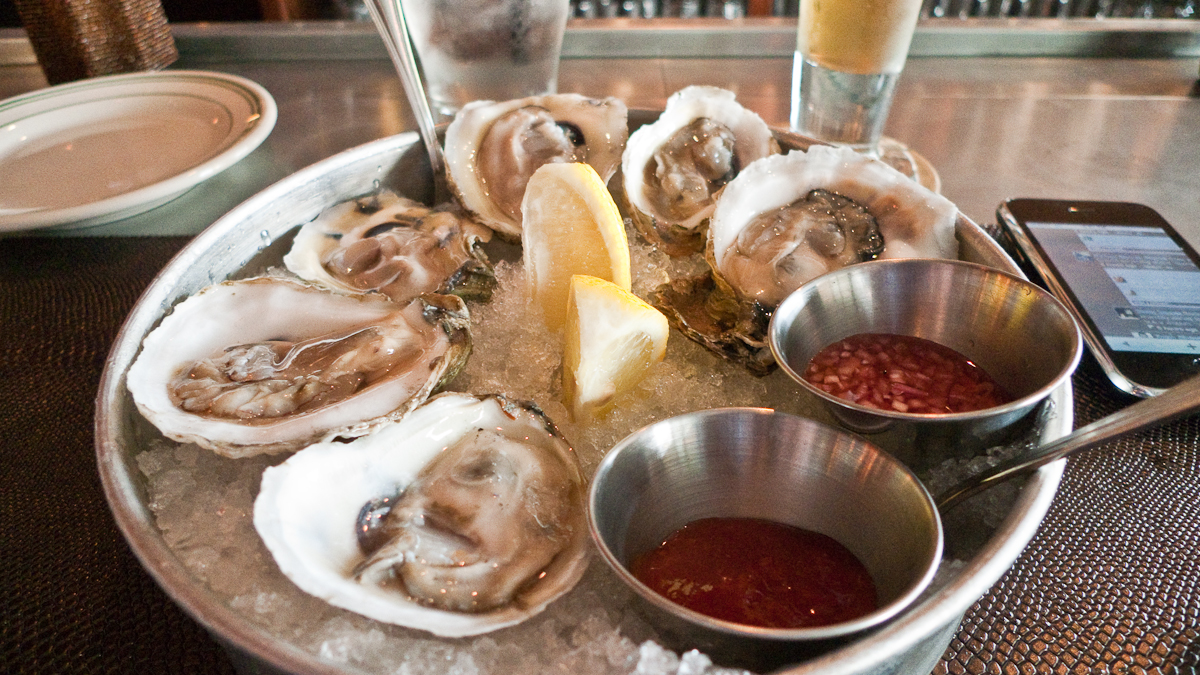
Raw oysters on the half-shell served with cocktail sauce and mignonette sauce

A raw bar is a small restaurant or a bar within a restaurant where live shellfish are shucked and served. Raw bars typically offer a variety of raw and cooked seafood and shellfish that is served cold. Seafood-based dishes may also be offered, and additional, non-seafood foods may also be part of the fare. Raw bars may offer alcoholic beverages such as oyster shooters, as well as wine and sake that is paired with various foods. Additional accompaniments may include condiments, sauces and foods such as lemon and lime. Several restaurants in the United States offer raw bars, some of which are seasonal.

== Fare ==
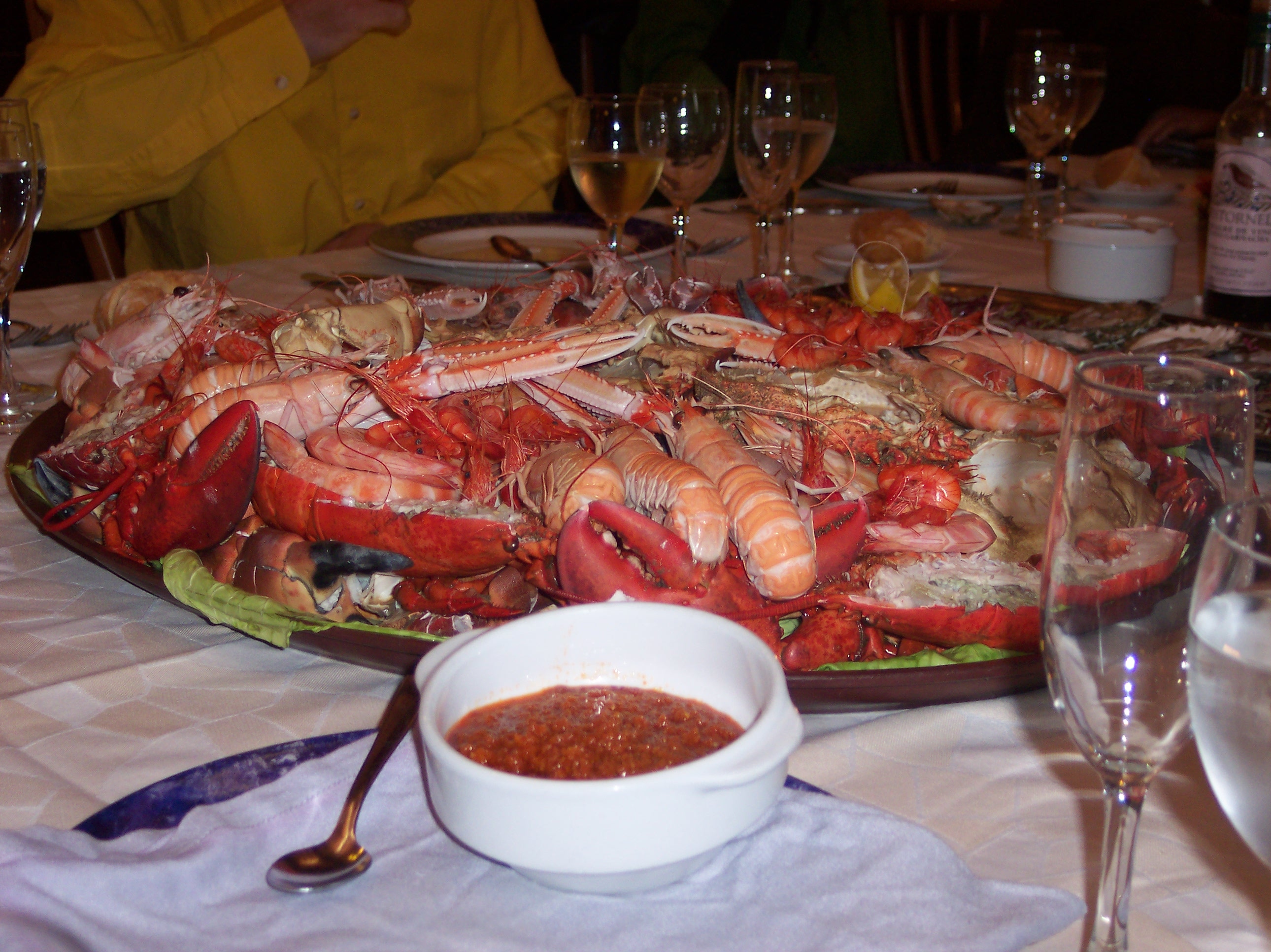
A plateau de fruits de mer

=== Raw seafood ===
Raw bars may serve a selection of raw oysters, clams, quahogs (hard clams), scallops and mussels. Varieties of hard clam may include littlenecks, which are less than 1.5 inches (3.8 cm) in size, and cherrystones, which are up to 2 inches (5 cm). Various types of oysters may be served. Some raw bars may offer oyster shooters, a type of cocktail prepared with raw oyster. Some also offer ceviche, a dish prepared with raw seafood that is cured with citrus juices, particularly lime. Thinly sliced octopus (octopus carpaccio) is another raw bar item.

=== Cooked seafood ===
Raw bars sometimes supplement the menu with cooked versions of the same and additional seafoods and shellfish that are typically served cold, such as clam chowder, oyster stew, poached shrimp, shrimp cocktail, cooked or seared scallops, mussels, crab legs, lobster, cured salmon, sea urchin and steamers (steamed clams).

==== Other cooked foods ====
Sometimes lightly cooked liver or foie gras is a raw bar item.

=== Dishes ===
The plateau de fruits de mer is a seafood dish sometimes offered by raw bars that is prepared with raw and cooked shellfish and served cold on a platter, usually on a bed of ice.

=== Accompaniments and condiments ===
Raw bars may offer wine or sake to accompany and be paired with the various foods. Condiments, such as cocktail sauce and lemon, may be available, which are typically served with raw oysters. These may also be used on other foods. Other food additions may include lime, tomato, chili peppers, mignonette sauce and caviar.

== Restaurants ==
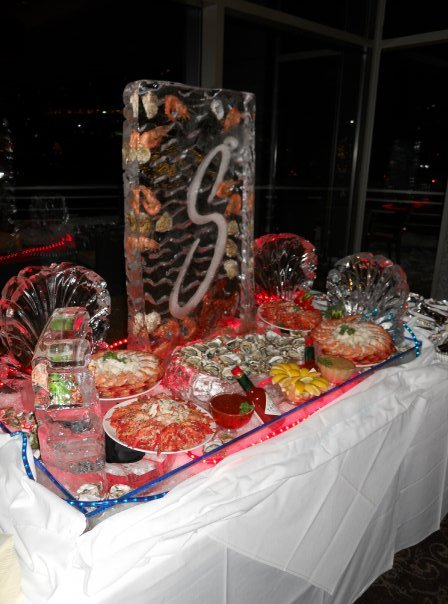
A raw bar at a Shanahan's restaurant

Raw bars exist in various cities in the United States and Mexico. Some bistro-style restaurants offer a raw bar. Some restaurants offer a seasonal raw bar, such as Grand Banks restaurant in New York City and Bagley & Shakespeare in London.

== Health risk ==
Consuming raw oysters is potentially dangerous as they might contain harmful bacteria. People eating raw oysters might contract vibriosis, an illness typically caused by eating raw seafood. There are reports of human casualties caused by consuming raw oysters.

== See also ==
- Seafood restaurant
- Oyster bar
- Sushi bar
- Salad bar
- List of oyster bars
- List of seafood dishes
- List of fish dishes
