= Shuckum's Oyster Bar =

- Interactive map of Shuckum's Oyster Bar

Restaurant information
- Location: N Young Cir, Hollywood, Florida, 33020, United States
- Coordinates: 26°00′38″N 80°08′38″W

Shuckum's Raw Bar & Grill was a restaurant located on Young Circle in downtown Hollywood, Florida.

The restaurant gained worldwide attention in 2001, when it was widely reported to have been one of the last places that the September 11 hijackers were seen prior to the attack, based on the testimony of its staff.

== Visit from Mohamed Atta ==
Night manager Tony Amos and waitress Patricia Idrissi were the focus of the media's eye following the attacks. Twelve hours after the attacks, FBI agents showed up at the bar, and passed around two photographs of Middle Eastern males they said had been aboard the aircraft.

Amos and Idrissi both said they recognized Mohamed Atta, who allegedly came with two other people the previous Saturday (September 8). The companions were later thought to have been Marwan al-Shehhi and Abdulaziz al-Omari. It was reported that Shehhi drank rum and coke and Atta drank five Stolichnaya vodkas with orange juice. The total bill came out to be $48. Atta reportedly looked agitated, which led Amos to ask if Atta could pay. Atta reportedly said, "Of course I can pay the bill. I'm an airline pilot." They left a tip, said to be $3 or $2.

One of the three people went to play some arcade games. Idrissi did not identify which of the three men played a game. Amos said that Atta had played blackjack and Trivial Pursuit and was very focused during the game.

== See also ==
- List of oyster bars
- List of seafood restaurants
