= Hank's Oyster Bar =

Historic bar and restaurant in Washington, D.C.

Restaurant information
- Established: 2005
- Owners: Jamie Leeds, Leeds Restaurant Group
- Location: United States
- Website: hanksoysterbar.com

Hank's Oyster Bar is a chain of oyster bars in Washington, D.C., and Virginia in the United States.

== Background ==
Founded in May 2005, the flagship restaurant was named "Hank's" after fisherman Hank Wolfe Leeds, the father of founder and chef Jamie Leeds.

Menu offerings at the oyster bar have included oysters on the half shell, "Hog Island-style BBQ" oysters, fried oysters, locally sourced seafood, crab cakes, clam chowder, and lobster rolls. Southern-inspired cuisine at the restaurant includes Oyster Po'boys.

The restaurant's first location is in D.C.'s Dupont Circle. It has since expanded to other locations throughout the years, including Old Town Alexandria (2007), D.C.'s Capitol Hill Eastern Market area (2012), the Wharf in D.C. (2017), a Nationals Park location, and a cocktail bar offering.

The restaurant chain has offered two proprietary oysters, including the Eastern Shore "Salty Wolfe" (named after Wolfe Leeds) and the Nomini Creek "Hayden's Reef" oysters.

=== Causes ===
The Hank's Oyster Bar chain is a supporter of the Chesapeake Bay Foundation’s "Save the Bay" campaign, serving as a hosting sponsor of the annual “D.C. On the Half Shell” event.

== Awards ==
Hank's Oyster Bar has been featured by numerous media outlets and organizations, including Bon Appetit, Gourmet, Food & Wine, The Washington Post, Southern Living, and the James Beard Foundation.

In 2006 and 2007, the restaurant was recognized as a "Best New Restaurant" and "Best Neighborhood Restaurant" by the Restaurant Association of Metropolitan Washington.

In 2014, The Washington Post's Express named Hank's as a "Best Seafood Restaurant."

In 2019, the restaurant was recognized in Washingtonian Magazine's "Best of Washington" Readers’ Poll as the "Best Raw Bar" and "Best Bloody Mary."

The restaurant was named "Best Oysters" in Virginia Living Magazine's 2019 "Best of Northern Virginia" awards.

Leeds and Hank's Oyster Bar were selected as a Washington Business Journal "Business of Pride" honoree in recognition of LGBTQ-inclusive hiring and advocacy within the DMV area.

The restaurant is included in the Michelin Guide of the "Best Seafood Restaurants in Washington, DC."

== In popular culture ==
The restaurant is visited and described by the characters in the 2015 political thriller, "Detained" by Don Brown, the first novel in the Navy JAG series.

In the 2020 novel The Rembrandt Conspiracy (Houghton Mifflin Harcourt) by Deron Hicks, the restaurant is dined at by the book's central characters.

== See also ==
- List of oyster bars
- List of seafood restaurants
