= Bookbinder soup =

Type of seafood soup originating in the USA

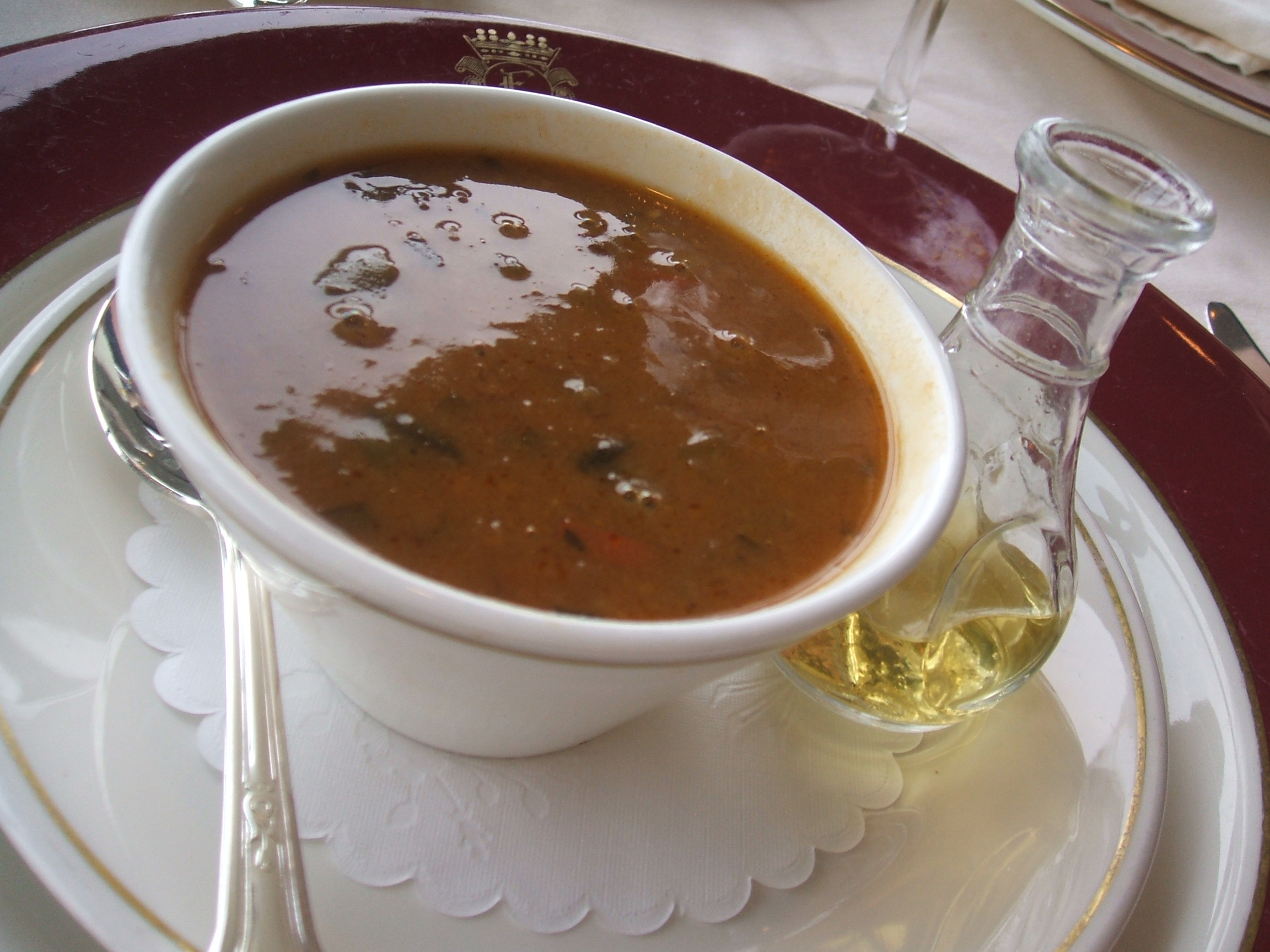
Bookbinder's soup

Bookbinder's soup, also known as snapper soup, is a type of seafood soup originating in the United States at Old Original Bookbinder's restaurant in Philadelphia. The original soup is a variety of turtle soup made with typical stew vegetables such as tomatoes, carrots, celery, bell peppers, onions, leeks, mushrooms, and garlic. It is commonly made with common snapping turtle meat. The soup spread to other places, such as the Drake Hotel in Chicago, where the turtle meat was replaced with red snapper, a fish chosen likely because of the similarity of the name. The Chicago Tribune published a version of the recipe given to them by the executive chef at the Drake.

The name "Bookbinder" comes from Samuel Bookbinder, a Jewish immigrant from the Netherlands who opened Old Original Bookbinder's in 1893. Its alternative name originally referred to the use of common snapping turtle meat in its preparation. Old Original Bookbinder's lists the soup as "snapper soup" on their menu, but the Bookbinder name is often used in other places.
