= Swan Oyster Depot =

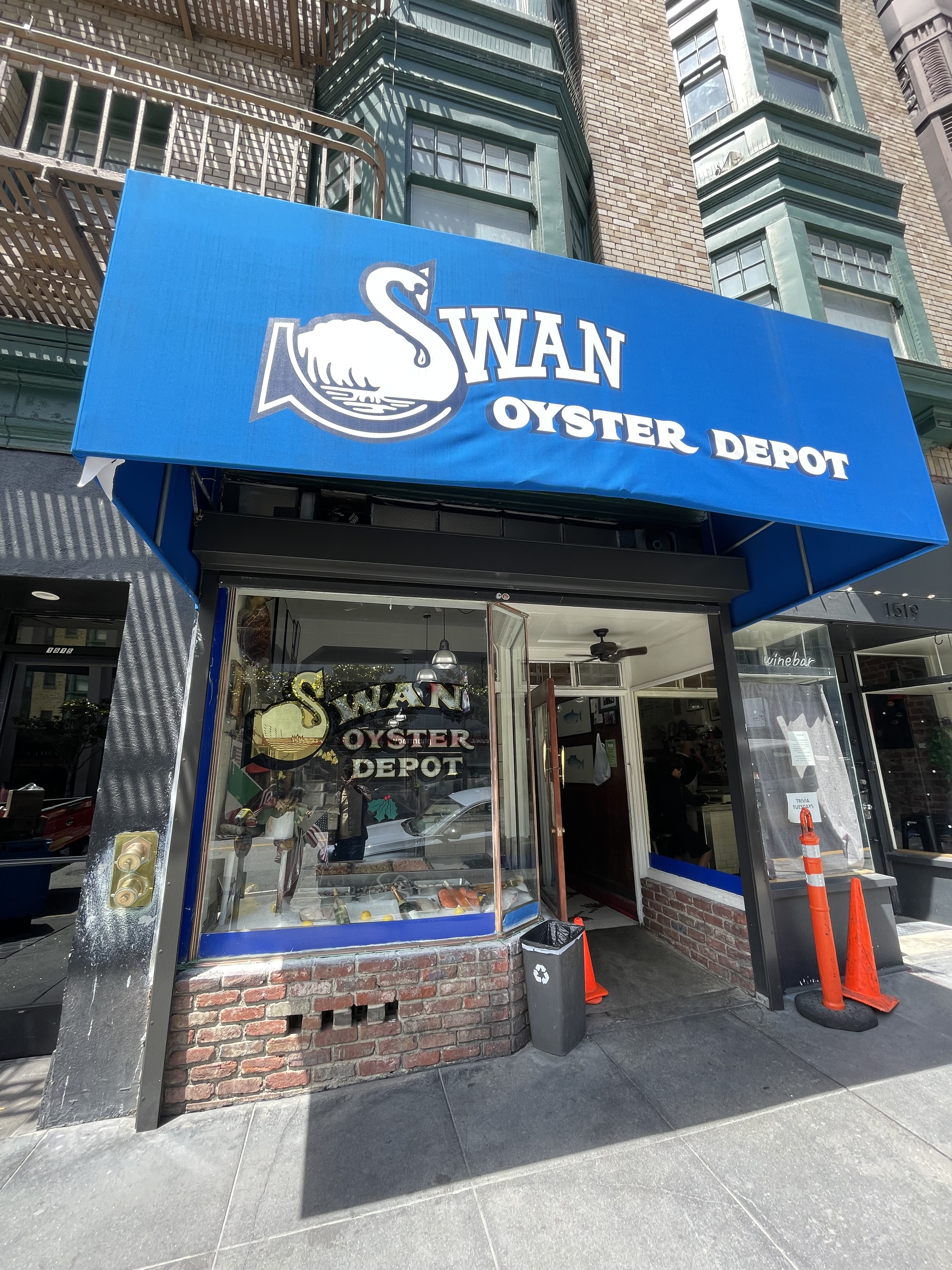
- Interactive map of Swan Oyster Depot

Restaurant information
- Established: 1903
- Owner: The Sancimino Brothers
- Previous owner: The Lausten Family
- Chef: Vincent Sancimino, Steven Sancimino, Thomas Sancimino, James Sancimino, Kevin Sancimino, Brian Dwyer, Marino Peradotto
- Food type: Seafood
- Dress code: None
- Rating: Michelin guide, James Beard Award, Silver Spoon
- Location: 1517 Polk Street, San Francisco, San Francisco, California, United States
- Coordinates: 37.79094°N 122.42091°W
- Seating capacity: 18
- Reservations: No Reservations
- Website: swanoysterdepot.net

Swan Oyster Depot is a seafood eatery and cultural landmark located in the Polk Gulch neighborhood of San Francisco, California. It opened there in 1903 and except for a brief hiatus and rebuilding period following the 1906 San Francisco earthquake, it has been running continuously in the same venue since that time. This makes it one of the longest continuous businesses and dining establishments in the United States. Swan's menu has remained largely unchanged throughout its history, and it has had exactly the same 18 wooden stools and marble counter that were installed for the post-earthquake reopening in 1912.

== History ==
Swan Oyster Depot first opened its doors in San Francisco in the early 1890s as the Cable Oyster Depot. Founded by the Lausten family, who were immigrants from Denmark, the shop started as a purveyor of shellfish from Fisherman's Wharf. The shop was located at 1517 Polk Street in the Polk Gulch neighborhood. After the devastating 1906 earthquake the Army Corps of Engineers dynamited everything from City Hall to Fisherman's Wharf to stop the fire from spreading. With their business gone, the Laustens made a name for themselves in the devastated post-earthquake community by bringing wheat to Golden Gate Park and handing it out to people so that they could make bread.

By 1912, the Laustens constructed a new shop at 1517 Polk Street, adjacent to the former location. Their earlier enterprise was named Cable Oyster Depot. They decided to change the name of the shop to something for good luck and chose Swan, because the Swan is the national bird of Denmark. After the shop was rebuilt the Lausten's expanded it to include a pickup and delivery business.

In 1946, Sal Sancimino and Pat La Rocca bought Swan Oyster Depot from the Laustens. Sal and his wife Rose were at the shop daily, with Sal working behind the counter and Rose doing the accounting and billing. The Sanciminos had six sons: Vincent, Steven, John, Thomas, Philip, Jim, and a daughter, Mary, and over the years, all of them worked at some point at the shop. Rose stopped doing the books when she was 90 and Sal worked until he turned 88.

When Sal Sancimino bought the shop, he expanded the line from shellfish to include Pacific coast fish and seafood. Sal described Swan as "strictly a seasonal house" meaning that everything sold there was fresh, rather than frozen.

The long Italian marble counter and the 18 stools have been there since the shop reopened.

== Critical reception ==
Swan Oyster Depot has been the focus of international travel writers and food critics for many years. One writer called it a "tiny temple dedicated to the glories of fruta di mare." The shop is often called a journey back in time because it has stayed largely unchanged for decades. The band of brothers behind the counter in the early days and now the Sancimino extended family is reportedly a big part of the attraction because of their extensive knowledge of seafood. The shop has stayed largely unchanged in terms of its seafood selection, wine selection, and presentation too, the simplicity of which has earned it consistent accolades. Its reputation for fresh seafood has been the subject of praise in travel guides and food publications. Celebrity chefs and critics are regular visitors and vocal reviewers.

CNN listed Swan's as one of "America's Best Historic Restaurants". Andrew Knowlton has called it his "favorite restaurant in America". Traci Des Jardins states that it is her "go-to place for cracked crab and oysters", noting that she has eaten there for over twenty years. James Beard was a major fan of Swan and regularly dined there.

Swan won the coveted James Beard Award for Best Restaurant and Chef in the American Classics category in 2000 and has been a semi-finalist for the award several times. On February 27, 2019, Swan Oyster Depot was announced as a semi-finalist for the James Beard Award for service.

The lines at Swan are known for being long at any time of the day.

== Lineage ==
While the Lausten family is credited with starting Swan Oyster Depot in the 1890s, it is the Sancimino family that can be credited with working to make Swan into a popular dining destination. The Sancimino brothers arrived in America in the 1880s from Sicily. They headed to the waters off Fisherman's Wharf to start making a living. Later, a fifth brother named Vincent arrived and started fishing the local waters as well. The catastrophic earthquake that either toppled or caused fires across much San Francisco in 1906 sent many San Francisco residents, including Vincent, to seek temporary refuge in city's Golden Gate Park. While there, he met Maria, a woman with Sicilian roots, who was serving soup to the displaced from an impromptu soup kitchen. Sometime thereafter, the two were married and eventually had two daughters and four sons, the eldest of which was Salvatore.

Salvatore Sancimino finished high school and during World War II, joined a branch of the Navy called the Seabees and served in the South Pacific. Shortly after his discharge, he married Rose, a former Army nurse. After having his first job working for a seafood wholesaler, he and Rose bought Swan Oyster Depot. Salvatore made it into both a seafood market and an informal eatery, with fresh daily fare being his standard for both. The seven Sancimino children grew up working various jobs behind the marble counter. Eventually, daughter Mary opted for another direction and became an attorney as did the eldest of the clan, Vincent. Vincent, however, eventually returned to the shop and took up his place beside his brothers. Rose and Sal had eight grandchildren, all of whom grew up working at some time in the restaurant.

== Menu ==
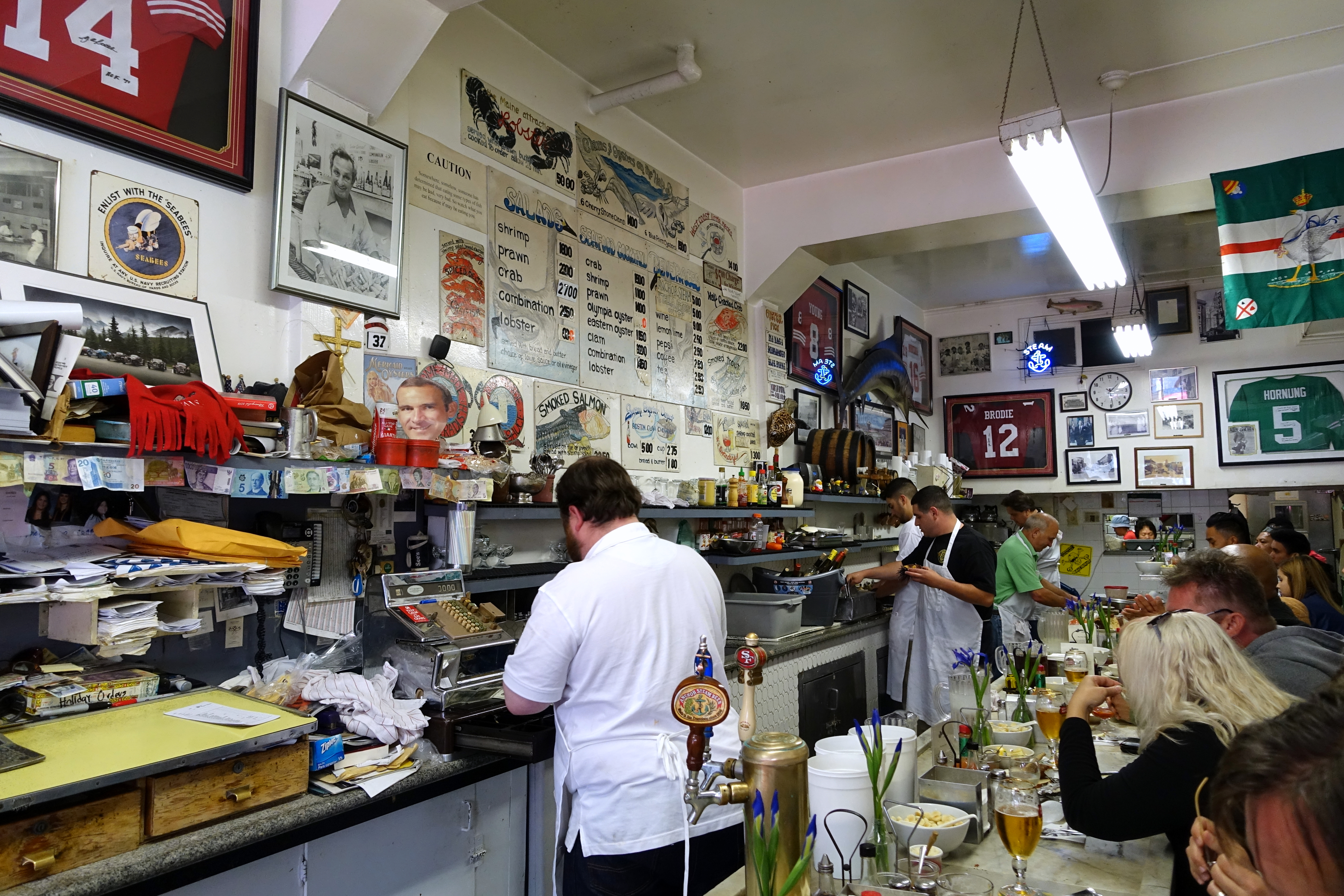
Interior of Swan Oyster Depot, showing it's menu and regional memorabilia

The walls of Swan Oyster Depot are covered with memorabilia and artifacts collected and curated during the shop's over century-long existence. Most prominent is the 3-panel handwritten menu, put up in 1985 and left unchanged since then, with eponymous swans illustrated on the corners.

Swan Oyster Depot is known for its selection of fresh and sometimes rare oysters, with the list of what is available changing daily. Olympias are one example. During the Gold Rush time in the 1850s, Olympias were popular, readily available in the Bay Area, and used in many dishes. Over time, however, because they are smaller and more slow to mature than most other popular oyster varieties, they became less profitable and more rare a choice for most shellfish purveyors to grow.

In addition to the posted menu, there is what has been called a "secret menu," which includes seafood selections that are known and requested by regulars The secret menu has such selections as the Smørrebrød, an open-faced sandwich; a "Dozen Eggs" which are thin, raw scallops with Sriracha in ponzu sauce, and Sicilian Sashimi.

== Notable diners ==
Celebrities have been regularly sighted at Swan Oyster Depot over the years. Bing Crosby, Margaret Thatcher, Francis Ford Coppola, Madeline Kahn, Michael Mina, Claudette Colbert, Julia Child, Nicolas Cage, Éric Ripert, Traci Des Jardins, Bono, to name but a few. James Beard, the famed cook, author, and champion of American cuisine, was a regular as was Anthony Bourdain, who lived in New York and was said to have come to Swan every time he came to visit San Francisco.

From the Swan beginning in the early 1900s, a regular following of locals has come either to eat or to pick up seafood to go. There are families that have come for six generations and the Swan crew knows the majority of customers by their first name.

=== Anthony Bourdain visits ===
Celebrity chef, author, and television host Anthony Bourdain was a Swan Oyster Depot regular for decades, paying his first visit to Swan Oyster Depot long before he had gained celebrity status. He described his relationship with Swan as "true love" and frequently made the restaurant a priority stop, alone or with a camera crew. After Bourdain's segment of his television show The Layover was taped in San Francisco at Swan Oyster Depot and aired on October 15, 2012, it increased the popularity of the restaurant.

On the day of Anthony Bourdain's death, June 8, 2018, hundreds of people came to Swan Oyster Depot to pay their respects to the star and remember him at the place he came so often in San Francisco.

== Gallery ==
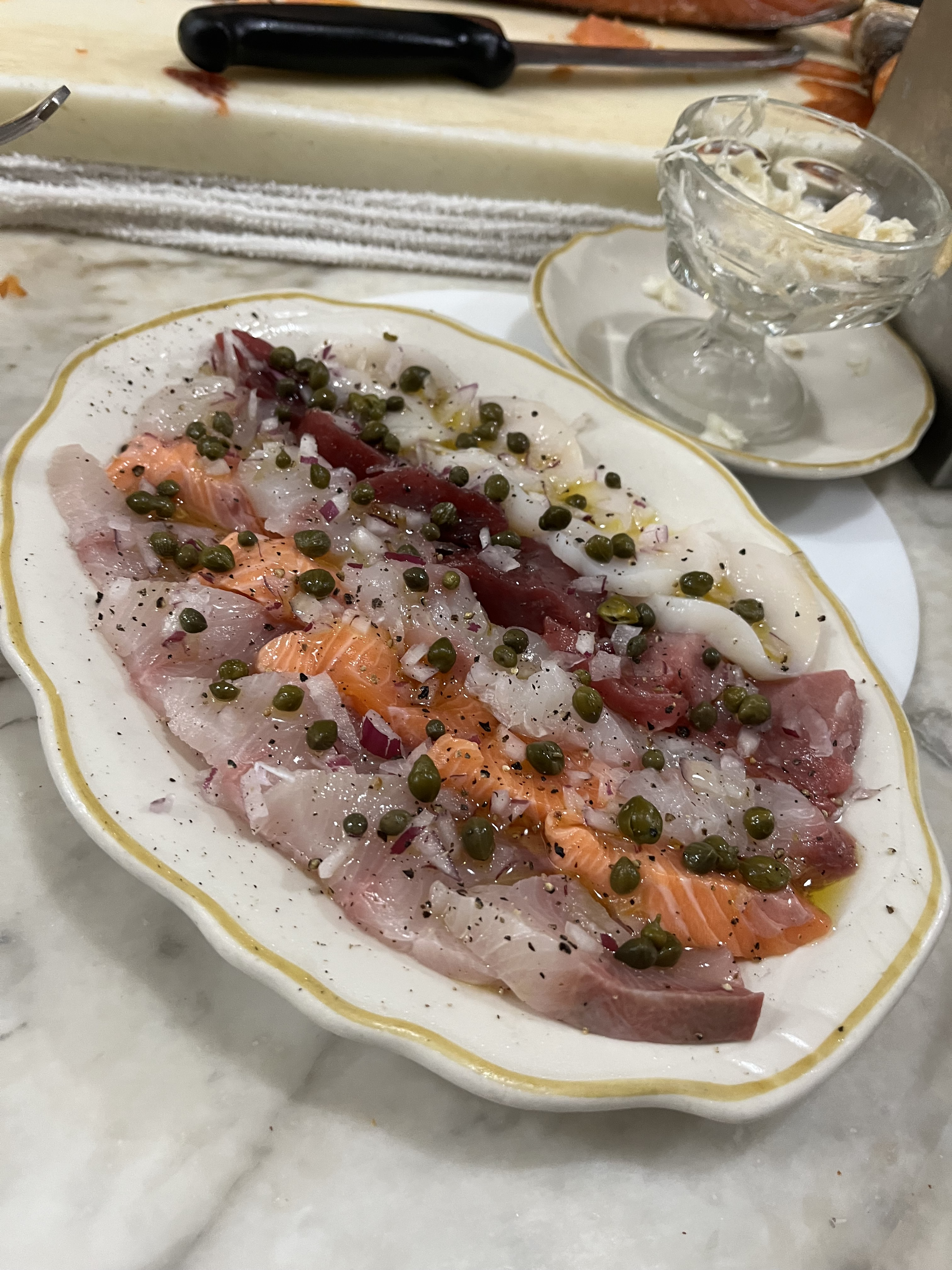
"Sicilian Sashimi"

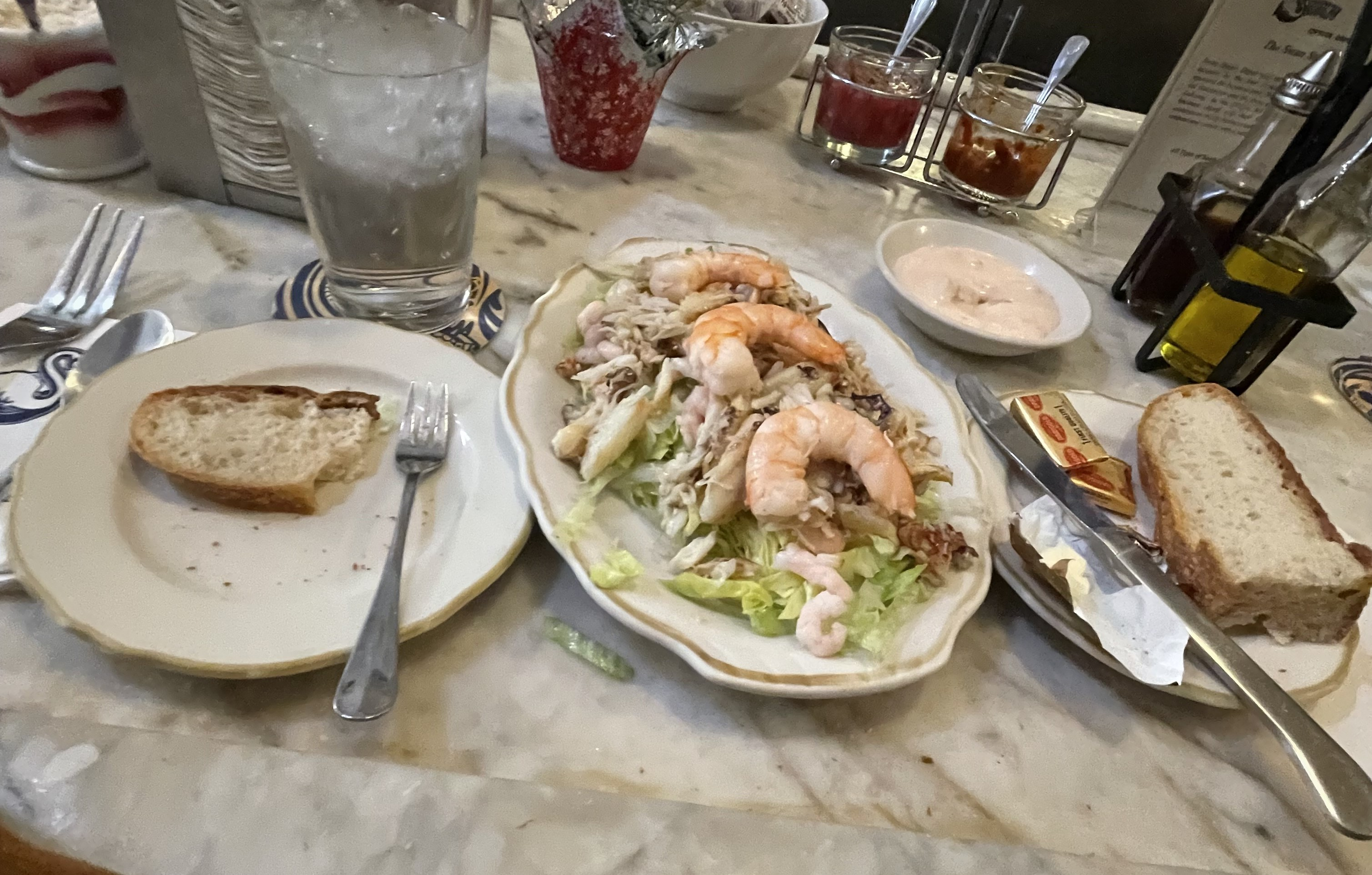
Combination salad with sourdough bread

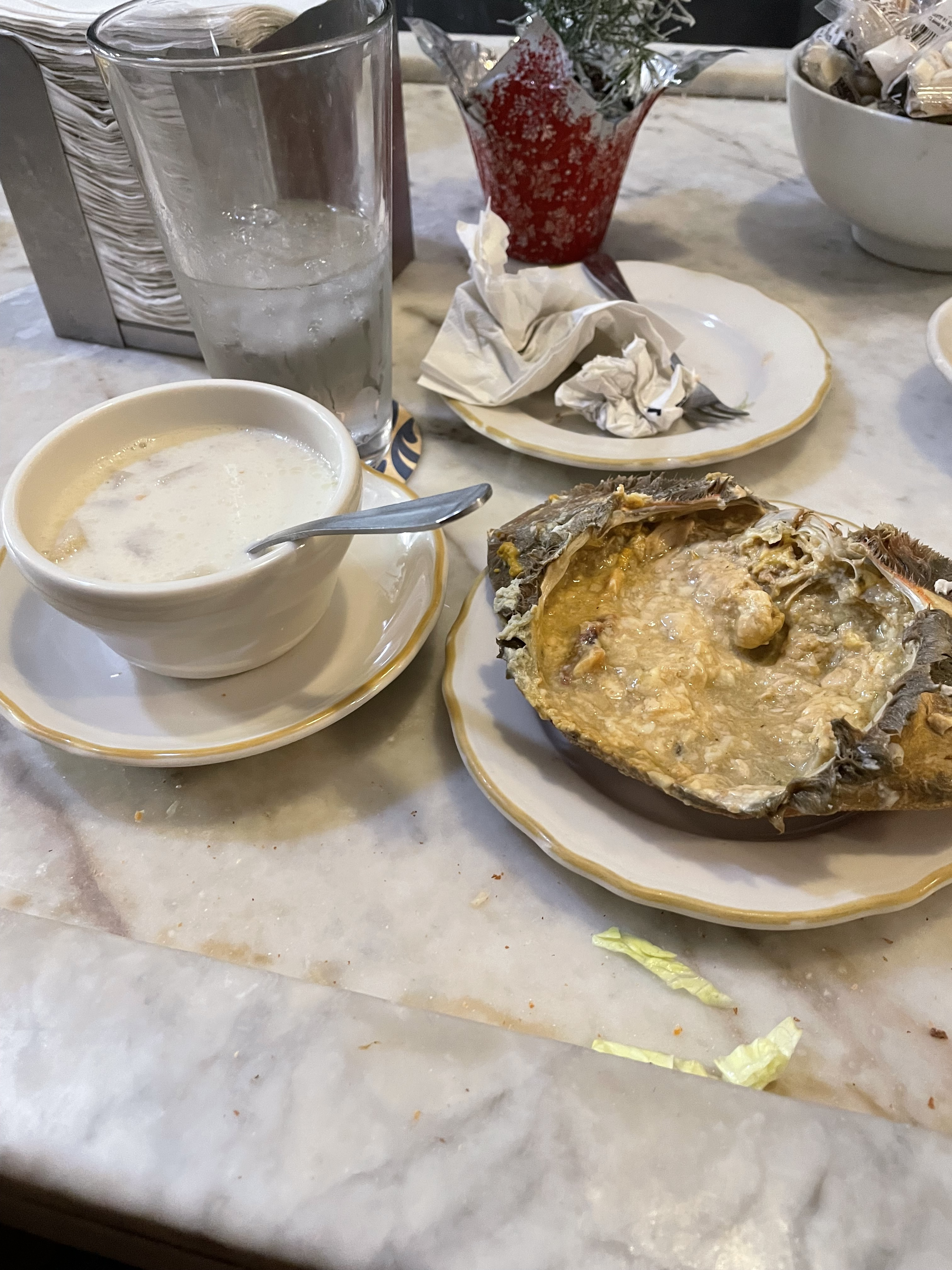
Clam Chowder and a "Crab Back"

== See also ==
- List of oyster bars
- List of seafood restaurants
