= Maison Premiere =

Restaurant in Williamsburg, New York

Maison Premiere is an oyster bar and cocktail restaurant located in Williamsburg, Brooklyn, New York City. Opened in 2011 at 298 Bedford Avenue, the restaurant is known for its oyster selection, absinthe program, and interior inspired by nineteenth-century New Orleans.

== History ==
Maison Premiere was opened in 2011 by Joshua Boissy and Krystof Zizka.

In a 2011 review for The New York Times, Pete Wells described Maison Premiere as resembling the French Quarter of the late nineteenth century.

Maison Premiere received the James Beard Foundation Award for Outstanding Bar Program in 2016.

In 2019, the restaurant's owners filed for Chapter 11 bankruptcy protection in order to restructure debt related to Maison Premiere and its sister restaurant, Sauvage.

During the COVID-19 pandemic, Eater New York reported in August 2020 that Maison Premiere appeared to have permanently closed. The restaurant reopened in June 2021.
