= Mignonette sauce =

Condiment served with oysters

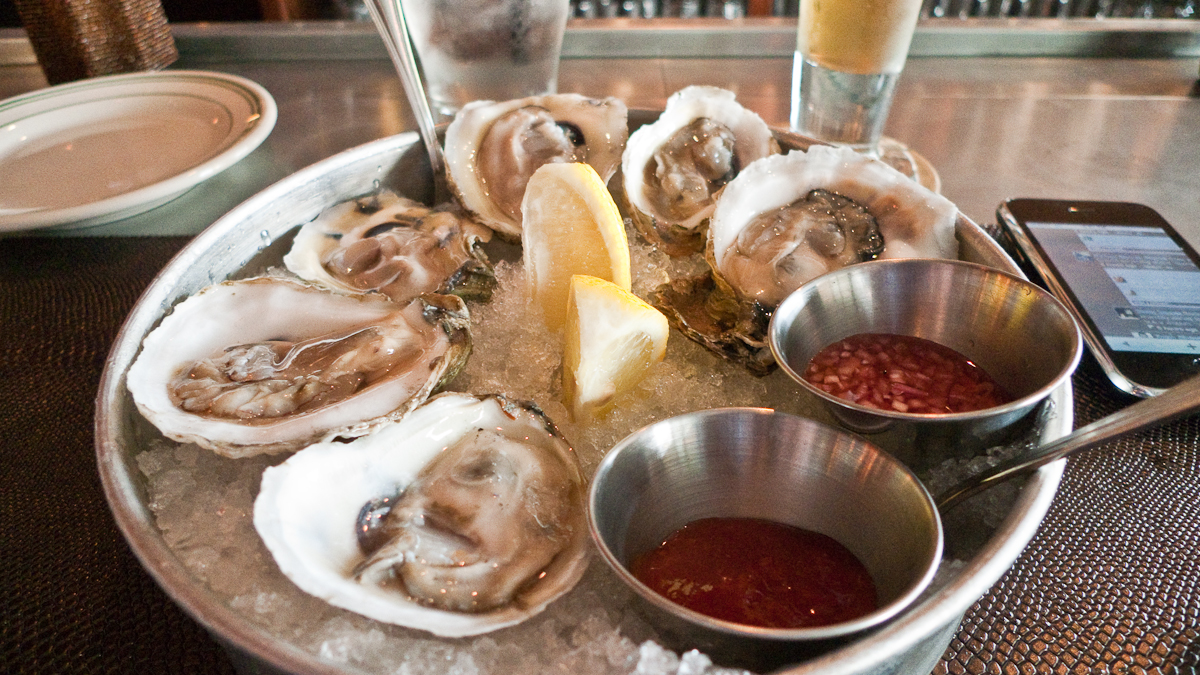
Raw oysters on the half-shell served with cocktail and mignonette sauces

Mignonette sauce is a condiment made with minced shallots, cracked pepper, and vinegar traditionally served with raw oysters.

The sauce originated in France. The French term mignonnette originally referred to a sachet of peppercorns, cloves, and spices used to flavor liquids, but now means cracked pepper.

While mignonette sauces may differ based on the type of vinegar, all contain pepper and shallots. Common vinegars used to make the sauce include champagne, red wine, or white wine vinegar.

== See also ==
- List of condiments
- List of sauces
