= Oyster bar =

Restaurant that serves oysters

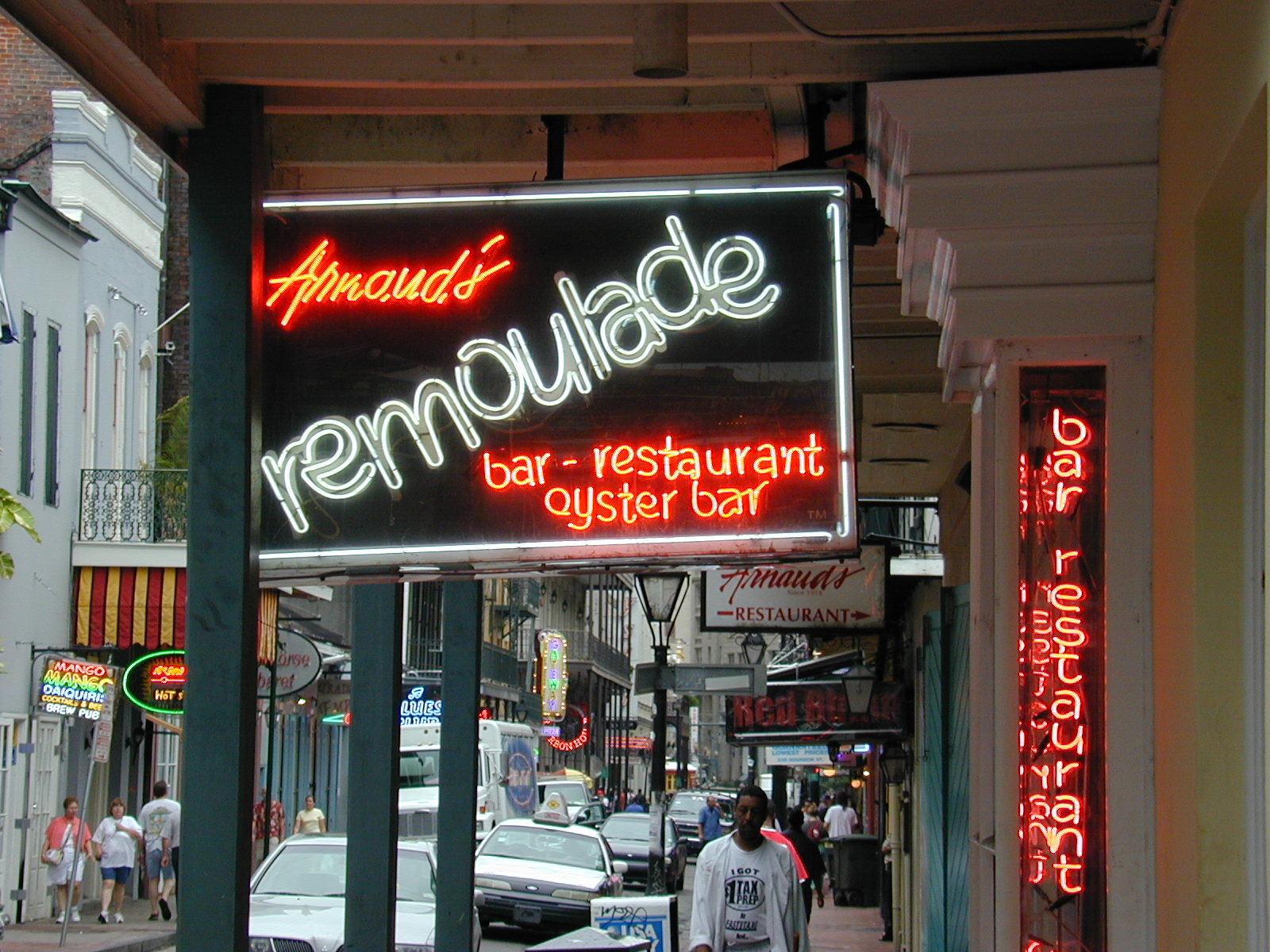
Arnaud's Remoulade, a restaurant and oyster bar in New Orleans, Louisiana, United States.

An oyster bar, also known as an oyster saloon, oyster house or a raw bar service, is a restaurant specializing in serving oysters, or a section of a restaurant which serves oysters buffet-style. Oysters have been consumed since ancient times and were common tavern food in Europe, but the oyster bar as a distinct restaurant began making an appearance in the 18th century.

== History ==
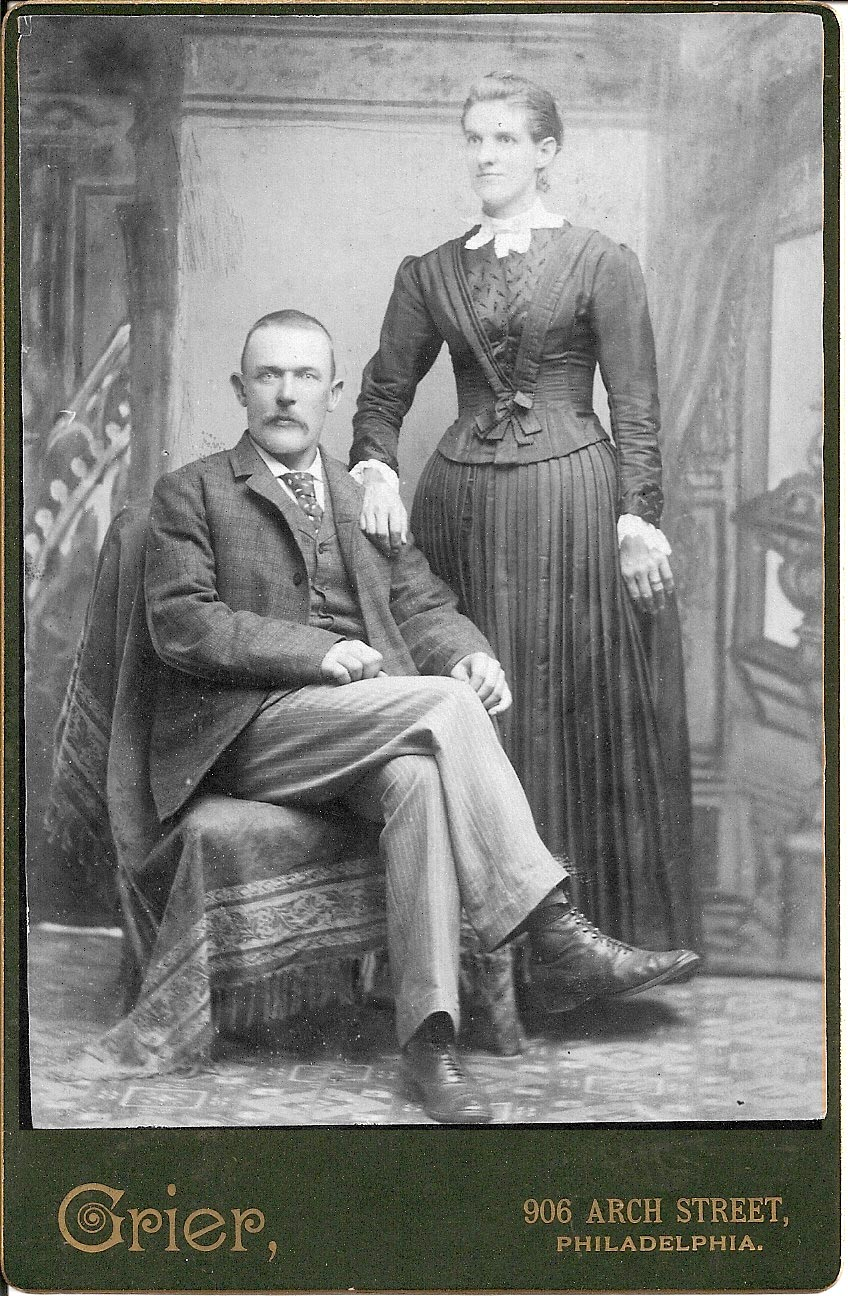
Samuel Mawhinney and Harriet Pearson Mawhinney, approx. 1890, proprietors of Mawhinney Oyster Saloon, Ridge Ave. Philadelphia PA

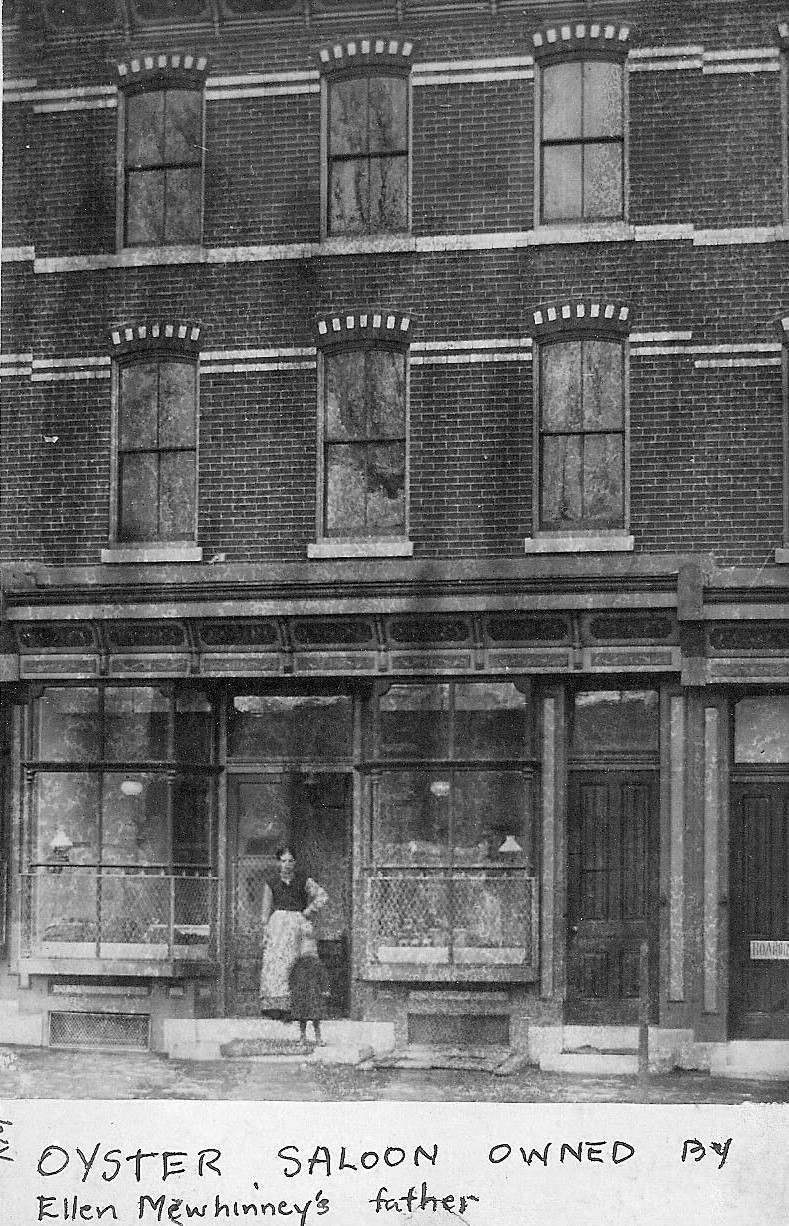
Mawhinney Oyster Saloon, Ridge Ave. in Philadelphia. PA. Approx. 1890

Oyster consumption in Europe was confined to the wealthy until the mid-17th century but, by the 18th century, the poor were also consuming them. Sources vary as to when the first oyster bar was created. One source claims that Sinclair's, a pub in Manchester, England, is the United Kingdom's oldest oyster bar. It opened in 1738. London's oldest restaurant, Rules, also began business as an oyster bar. It opened in 1798.

In North America, Native Americans on both coasts ate oysters in large quantities, as did colonists from Europe, reflecting the abundance of oyster beds off both coasts of the continent. This abundance meant that unlike in Europe, oyster consumption in North America after colonization by Europeans was never confined to the upper classes, and oysters were commonly served in taverns. During the early 19th century, express wagons filled with oysters crossed the Allegheny Mountains to reach the American Midwest. The oldest oyster bar in the United States is Union Oyster House in Boston, which opened in 1826. It features oyster shucking in front of the customer, and patrons may make their own oyster sauces from condiments on the tables. It has served as a model for many oyster bars in the United States.

During the same period, oysters were an integral part of some African-American communities. One example is Sandy Ground, which was located in modern-day Rossville, Staten Island. African-Americans were drawn to the oyster industry because it promised autonomy, as they were involved throughout the process of harvesting and selling. In addition, oyster farmers were relatively less impoverished than slaves and did not work under white owners. A recipe for an oyster pie in Abby Fisher's 1881 cookbook, What Mrs. Fisher Knows About Old Southern Cooking, suggests the influence of oysters on African-American foodways and culture.

By 1850, nearly every major town in North America had an oyster bar, oyster cellar, oyster parlor, or oyster saloon—almost always located in the basement of the establishment (where keeping ice was easier). Oysters and bars often went hand-in-hand in the United States, because oysters were seen as a cheap food to serve alongside beer and liquor.

By the late 1880s, an "oyster craze" had swept the United States, and oyster bars were prominent gathering places in Boston, Chicago, Cincinnati, Denver, Louisville, New York City, and St. Louis. An 1881 U.S. government fisheries study counted 379 oyster houses in the Philadelphia city directory alone, a figure explicitly not including oyster consumption at hotels or other saloons. In 1892, the Pittsburgh Dispatch estimated the annual consumption (in terms of individual oysters) for London at one billion, and the United States as a whole at twelve billion oysters.

This enormous demand for oysters was not sustainable. The beds of the Chesapeake Bay, which supplied much of the American Midwest, were becoming rapidly depleted by the early 1890s. Increasing restrictions on oystering seasons and methods in the late 19th century led to the rise of oyster pirates, culminating in the Oyster Wars of the Chesapeake Bay, that pitted poachers against armed law enforcement authorities of Virginia and Maryland (dubbed the "oyster navy").

According to The New York Times in 2014, about 90 percent of oyster bar sales in the United States come from farmed (not wild) oysters.

== See also ==
- List of oyster bars
- Raw bar

== Bibliography ==
- Betti, Tom and Sauer, Doreen Uhas. Historic Columbus Taverns: The Capital City's Most Storied Saloons. Charleston, S.C.: History Press, 2012.
- Fisher, Abby. What Mrs. Fisher Knows About Old Southern Cooking, 1881.
- Green, Aliza. Field Guide to Seafood: How to Identify, Select, and Prepare Virtually Every Fish and Shellfish at the Market. Philadelphia: Quirk Books, 2007.
- Kemp, David. The Pleasures and Treasures of Britain: A Discerning Traveller's Companion. Toronto: Dundurn, 1992.
- Kerr, Jean and Smith, Spencer. Mystic Seafood: Great Recipes, History, and Seafaring Lore From Mystic Seaport. Guilford, Conn.: Insiders Guide, 2006.
- Koo, Dinah; Poon, Janice; and Szabo, John. The Cocktail Chef: Entertaining in Style. Vancouver, B.C.: Douglas & McIntyre 2006.
- MacMurray, Patrick. Consider the Oyster: A Shucker's Field Guide. New York: Thomas Dunne Books, 2007.
- Porter, Darwin and Prince, Danforth. Frommer's Great Britain. Hoboken, N.J.: John Wiley & Sons, 2003.
- Reardon, Joan. Oysters: A Culinary Celebration. Guilford, Conn.: Lyons Press, 2004.
- Rosso, Julee and Lukins, Sheila. The New Basics Cookbook. New York: Workman Pub., 1989.
- The Visual Food Encyclopedia. Montréal, Québec: Les editions Québec Amerique, 1996.
- Walsh, Robb. Sex, Death & Oysters: A Half-Shell Lover's World Tour. Berkeley, Calif.: Counterpoint, 2010.
- Williams, Nicola. France. London: Lonely Planet, 2009.
