= Landmark Books (series) =

Children's history book series

Logo for the Landmark Books series

Landmark Books was a children's book series published by Random House from 1950 to 1970, featuring stories of significant people and events in American history written by popular authors at the time. The series expanded in 1953 to include world history as a sub-series called World Landmark Books, and a second sub-series of larger-format books illustrated with color artwork or black and white photographs was introduced in the 1960s as Landmark Giant, which would continue releasing new titles beyond the end of the main series until 1974. Select titles from the American and World series were reissued in paperback from the 1980s to the early 2000s.

Volumes in the initial run of the American, World, and Giant series were numbered, and a list of titles was printed on the inside of each book's dust jacket. The series would grow to include 122 American, 63 World, and 25 Giant volumes by noted authors like C. S. Forester, Robert Penn Warren, Pearl S. Buck, Quentin Reynolds, MacKinlay Kantor, Shirley Jackson, Daniel J. Boorstin, and many others.

A blurb printed on the jacket of later entries in the series by Millicent Taylor, former Education Editor for The Christian Science Monitor, described the Landmark Books as being intended for ages ten to fifteen, uniformly under 200 pages, and illustrated with maps and drawings.

David Spear, writing in the American Historical Association's news magazine, says that the series "lured an entire generation of young readers" to the history discipline, "including many of today's professional historians."

== List of titles and authors ==
#	Title	Author	Year
1	The Voyages of Christopher Columbus	Armstrong Sperry	1950
2	The Landing of the Pilgrims	James Daugherty	1950
3	Pocahontas and Captain John Smith	Marie Lawson	1950
4	Paul Revere and the Minute Men	Dorothy Canfield Fisher	1950
5	Our Independence and the Constitution	Dorothy Canfield Fisher	1950
6	The California Gold Rush	May McNeer	1950
7	The Pony Express	Samuel Hopkins Adams	1950
8	Lee and Grant at Appomattox	MacKinlay Kantor	1950
9	The Building of the First Transcontinental Railroad	Adele Gutman Nathan	1950
10	The Wright Brothers	Quentin Reynolds	1950
11	Prehistoric America	Anne Terry White	1951
12	The Vikings	Elizabeth Janeway	1951
13	The Santa Fe Trail	Samuel Hopkins Adams	1951
14	The Story of the U.S. Marines	George Hunt	1951
15	The Lewis and Clark Expedition	Richard L. Neuberger	1951
16	The Monitor and the Merrimac	Fletcher Pratt	1951
17	The Explorations of Pere Marquette	Jim Kjelgaard	1951
18	The Panama Canal	Bob Considine	1951
19	The Pirate Lafitte and the Battle of New Orleans	Robert Tallant	1951
20	Custer's Last Stand	Quentin Reynolds	1951
21	Daniel Boone	John Mason Brown	1952
22	Clipper Ship Days	John Jennings	1952
23	Gettysburg	MacKinlay Kantor	1952
24	The Louisiana Purchase	Robert Tallant	1952
25	Wild Bill Hickok Tames the West	Stewart H. Holbrook	1952
26	Betsy Ross and the Flag	Jane Mayer	1952
27	The Conquest of the North and South Poles	Russell Owen	1952
28	Ben Franklin of Old Philadelphia	Margaret Cousins	1952
29	Trappers and Traders of the Far West	James Daugherty	1952
30	Mr. Bell Invents the Telephone	Katherine B. Shippen	1952
31	The Barbary Pirates	C. S. Forester	1953
32	Sam Houston, the Tallest Texan	William Johnson	1953
33	The Winter at Valley Forge	Van Wyck Mason	1953
34	The Erie Canal	Samuel Hopkins Adams	1953
35	Thirty Seconds Over Tokyo	Ted Lawson and Bob Considine	1953
36	Thomas Jefferson, Father of Democracy	Vincent Sheean	1953
37	The Coming of the Mormons	Jim Kjelgaard	1953
38	George Washington Carver, the Story of a Great American	Anne Terry White	1953
39	John Paul Jones, Fighting Sailor	Armstrong Sperry	1953
40	The First Overland Mail	Robert Pinkerton	1953
41	Teddy Roosevelt and the Rough Riders	Henry Castor	1954
42	To California by Covered Wagon	George R. Stewart	1954
43	Peter Stuyvesant of Old New York	Anna Erskine Crouse and Russel Crouse	1954
44	Lincoln and Douglas: The Years of Decision	Regina Z. Kelly	1954
45	Robert Fulton and the Steamboat	Ralph Nading Hill	1954
46	The F.B.I.	Quentin Reynolds	1954
47	Dolly Madison	Jane Mayer	1954
48	John James Audubon	Margaret Kieran and John Kieran	1954
49	Hawaii, Gem of the Pacific	Oscar Lewis	1954
50	War Chief of the Seminoles	May McNeer	1954
51	Old Ironsides, the Fighting Constitution	Harry Hansen	1955
52	The Mississippi Bubble	Thomas B. Costain	1955
53	Kit Carson and the Wild Frontier	Ralph Moody (writer)	1955
54	Robert E. Lee and the Road of Honor	Hodding Carter	1955
55	Guadalcanal Diary	Richard Tregaskis	1955
56	Commodore Perry and the Opening of Japan	Ferdinand Kuhn	1955
57	Davy Crockett	Stewart H. Holbrook	1955
58	Clara Barton, Founder of the American Red Cross	Helen Dore Boylston	1955
59	The Story of San Francisco	Charlotte Jackson	1955
60	Up the Trail from Texas	J. Frank Dobie	1955
61	Abe Lincoln: Log Cabin to White House	Sterling North	1956
62	The Story of D-Day: June 6, 1944	Bruce Bliven, Jr.	1956
63	Rogers' Rangers and the French and Indian War	Bradford Smith	1956
64	The World's Greatest Showman: The Life of P. T. Barnum	J. Bryan, III	1956
65	Sequoyah: Leader of the Cherokees	Alice Marriott	1956
66	Ethan Allen and the Green Mountain Boys	Slater Brown	1956
67	Wyatt Earp: U.S. Marshal	Stewart H. Holbrook	1956
68	The Early Days of Automobiles	Elizabeth Janeway	1956
69	The Witchcraft of Salem Village	Shirley Jackson	1956
70	The West Point Story	Col. Red Reeder and Nardi Reeder Campion	1956
71	George Washington: Frontier Colonel	Sterling North	1957
72	The Texas Rangers	Will Henry	1957
73	Buffalo Bill's Great Wild West Show	Walter Havighurst	1957
74	Evangeline and the Acadians	Robert Tallant	1957
75	The Story of the Secret Service	Ferdinand Kuhn	1957
76	Tippecanoe and Tyler, Too!	Stanley Young	1957
77	America's First World War: General Pershing and the Yanks	Henry Castor	1957
78	The Doctors Who Conquered Yellow Fever	Ralph Nading Hill	1957
79	Remember the Alamo!	Robert Penn Warren	1958
80	Andrew Carnegie and the Age of Steel	Katherine B. Shippen	1958
81	Geronimo: Wolf of the Warpath	Ralph Moody (writer)	1958
82	The Story of the Paratroops	George Weller	1958
83	The American Revolution	Bruce Bliven, Jr.	1958
84	The Story of the Naval Academy	Felix Riesenberg, Jr.	1958
85	Alexander Hamilton and Aaron Burr	Anna Erskine Crouse and Russel Crouse	1958
86	Stonewall Jackson	Jonathan Daniels	1959
87	The Battle for the Atlantic	Jay Williams	1959
88	The First Transatlantic Cable	Adele Gutman Nathan	1959
89	The Story of the Air Force	Robert Loomis	1959
90	The Swamp Fox of the Revolution	Stewart H. Holbrook	1959
91	Heroines of the Early West	Nancy Wilson Ross	1960
92	The Alaska Gold Rush	May McNeer	1960
93	The Golden Age of Railroads	Stewart H. Holbrook	1960
94	From Pearl Harbor to Okinawa	Bruce Bliven, Jr.	1960
95	The Copper Kings of Montana	Marian T. Place	1961
96	Great American Fighter Pilots of World War II	Robert D. Loomis	1961
97	The Story of the U.S. Coast Guard	Eugene Rachlis	1961
98	William Penn: Quaker Statesman	Hildegarde Dolson	1961
99	John F. Kennedy & PT 109	Richard Tregaskis	1962
100	The Story of Oklahoma	Lon Tinkle	1962
101	Americans into Orbit: The Story of Project Mercury	Gene Gurney	1962
102	The Story of Submarines	George Weller	1962
103	The Seabees of World War II	Edmund Castillo	1963
104	The U.S. Border Patrol	Clement Hellyer	1963
105	The Flying Tigers	John Toland	1963
106	The U.S. Frogmen of World War II	Wyatt Blassingame	1964
107	Women of Courage	Dorothy Nathan	1964
108	Dwight D. Eisenhower	Malcolm Moos	1964
109	Disaster at Johnstown: The Great Flood	Hildegarde Dolson	1965
110	The Story of Thomas Alva Edison	Margaret Cousins	1965
111	Medal of Honor Heroes	Col. Red Reeder	1965
112	From Casablanca to Berlin	Bruce Bliven, Jr.	1965
113	Young Mark Twain and the Mississippi	Harnett T. Kane	1966
114	The Battle of the Bulge	John Toland	1966
115	The Story of the Thirteen Colonies	Clifford Lindsey Alderman	1966
116	Combat Nurses of World War II	Wyatt Blassingame	1967
117	Walk in Space: The Story of Project Gemini	Gene Gurney	1967
118	The Battle for Iwo Jima	Robert Leckie	1967
119	Midway: Battle for the Pacific	Capt Edmund L. Castillo	1968
120	Medical Corps Heroes of World War II	Wyatt Blassingame	1969
121	Flat Tops: The Story of Aircraft Carriers	Edmund L. Castillo	1969
122	The Mysterious Voyage of Captain Kidd	A. B. C. Whipple	1970
W-1	The First Men in the World	Anne Terry White	1953
W-2	Alexander the Great	John Gunther	1953
W-3	Adventures and Discoveries of Marco Polo	Richard J. Walsh	1953
W-4	Joan of Arc	Nancy Wilson Ross	1953
W-5	King Arthur and His Knights	Mabel Louise Robinson	1953
W-6	Mary: Queen of Scots	Emily Hahn	1953
W-7	Napoleon and the Battle of Waterloo	Frances Winwar	1953
W-8	Royal Canadian Mounted Police	Richard L. Neuberger	1953
W-9	The Man Who Changed China: The Story of Sun Yat-sen	Pearl S. Buck	1953
W-10	The Battle of Britain	Quentin Reynolds	1953
W-11	The Crusades	Anthony West	1954
W-12	Genghis Khan and the Mongol Horde	Harold Lamb	1954
W-13	Queen Elizabeth and the Spanish Armada	Frances Winwar	1954
W-14	Simon Bolivar: The Great Liberator	Arnold Whitridge	1954
W-15	The Slave Who Freed Haiti: The Story of Toussaint Louverture	Katherine Scherman	1954
W-16	The Story of Scotland Yard	Laurence Thompson	1954
W-17	The Life of Saint Patrick	Quentin Reynolds	1955
W-18	The Exploits of Xenophon	Geoffrey Household	1955
W-19	Captain Cook Explores the South Seas	Armstrong Sperry	1955
W-20	Marie Antoinette	Bernadine Kielty	1955
W-21	Will Shakespeare and the Globe Theater	Anne Terry White	1955
W-22	The French Foreign Legion	Wyatt Blassingame	1955
W-23	Martin Luther	Harry Emerson Fosdick	1956
W-24	The Hudson's Bay Company	Richard Morenus	1956
W-25	Balboa: Swordsman and Conquistador	Felix Riesenberg	1956
W-26	The Magna Charta	James Daugherty	1956
W-27	Leonardo da Vinci	Emily Hahn	1956
W-28	General Brock and Niagara Falls	Samuel Hopkins Adams	1957
W-29	Catherine the Great	Katherine Scherman	1957
W-30	The Fall of Constantinople	Bernadine Kielty	1957
W-31	Ferdinand Magellan: Master Mariner	Seymour Gates Pond	1957
W-32	Garibaldi: Father of Modern Italy	Marcia Davenport	1957
W-33	The Story of Albert Schweitzer	Anita Daniel	1957
W-34	The Marquis de Lafayette: Bright Sword for Freedom	Hodding Carter	1958
W-35	Famous Pirates of the New World	A. B. C. Whipple	1958
W-36	Exploring the Himalaya	William O. Douglas	1958
W-37	Queen Victoria	Noel Streatfeild	1958
W-38	The Flight and Adventures of Charles II	Charles Norman	1958
W-39	Chief of the Cossacks	Harold Lamb	1959
W-40	Adventures of Ulysses	Gerald Gottlieb	1959
W-41	William the Conqueror	Thomas B. Costain	1959
W-42	Jesus of Nazareth	Harry Emerson Fosdick	1959
W-43	Julius Caesar	John Gunther	1959
W-44	The Story of Australia	A. Grove Day	1960
W-45	Captain Cortes Conquers Mexico	William Johnson	1960
W-46	Florence Nightingale	Ruth Fox Hume	1960
W-47	The Rise and Fall of Adolf Hitler	William L. Shirer	1961
W-48	The Story of Atomic Energy	Laura Fermi	1961
W-49	Great Men of Medicine	Ruth Fox Hume	1961
W-50	Cleopatra of Egypt	Leonora Hornblow	1961
W-51	The Sinking of the Bismarck	William L. Shirer	1962
W-52	Lawrence of Arabia	Alistair MacLean	1962
W-53	The Life of Saint Paul	Harry Emerson Fosdick	1962
W-54	The Voyages of Henry Hudson	Eugene Rachlis	1962
W-55	Hero of Trafalgar	A. B. C. Whipple	1963
W-56	Winston Churchill	Quentin Reynolds	1963
W-57	The War in Korea: 1950–1953	Robert Leckie	1963
W-58	Walter Raleigh	Henrietta Buckmaster	1964
W-59	Pharaohs of Ancient Egypt	Elizabeth Payne	1964
W-60	Flying Aces of World War I	Gene Gurney	1965
W-61	Commandos of World War II	Hodding Carter	1966
W-62	Ben Gurion and the Birth of Israel	Joan Comay	1967
W-63	The United Nations in War and Peace	T. R. Fehrenback	1968
Giant-1	The FBI Story	Don Whitehead, Foreword by J. Edgar Hoover	1961
Giant-2	The Continent We Live On	Ivan T. Sanderson	1961
Giant-3	The American Indian	William Brandon	1962
Giant-4	The Story of Baseball	John M. Rosenburg	1962
Giant-5	Life in the Ancient World	Bart Winer	1963
Giant-6	Life in Colonial America	Elizabeth George Speare	1963
Giant-7	The Story of World War II	Robert Leckie	1964
Giant-8	Life in Lincoln's America	Helen Reeder Cross	1964
Giant-9	The Story of Football	Robert Leckie	1965
Giant-10	The Story of World War I	Samuel Lyman Atwood Marshall and Robert Leckie	1965
Giant-11	Great American Athletes of the 20th Century	Zander Hollander	1966
Giant-12	Life in the Middle Ages	Jay Williams	1966
Giant-13	Washington, D.C.: The Story of Our Nation's Capital	Howard K. Smith	1967
Giant-14	American Heroes of the 20th Century	Harold Faber	1967
Giant-15	The Story of New England	Monroe Stearns	1967
Giant-16	The Landmark History of the American People from Plymouth to Appomattox	Daniel J. Boorstin	1968
Giant-17	Great American Battles	Robert Leckie	1968
Giant-18	Life in the Renaissance	Marzieh Gail	1968
Giant-19	New York: The Story of the World's Most Exciting City	Bruce Bliven	1969
Giant-20	Americans to the Moon: The Story of Project Apollo	Gene Gurney	1970
Giant-21	The Landmark History of the American People from Appomattox to the Moon	Daniel J. Boorstin	1970
Giant-22	American Sports Heroes of Today	Frederic Katz	1970
Giant-23	Pro Football Heroes of Today	Berry Stainback	1973
Giant-24	Great Moments in American Sports	Jerry Brondfield	1974
Giant-25	Pro Hockey Heroes of Today	Bill Libby	1974
