= Emmett Watson =

American journalist (1918–2001)

- Born: Emmett McWhirt; November 22, 1918; Seattle, Washington, U.S.
- Died: May 11, 2001 (aged 82); Seattle, Washington, U.S.
- Occupation: Newspaper columnist
- Children: 2
- Parent(s): Garfield and Lena McWhirt née Cornthwaite (birth); John and Elizabeth Watson (adoptive)

Emmett Watson (November 22, 1918 – May 11, 2001) was an American newspaper columnist from Seattle, Washington, whose columns ran in a variety of Seattle newspapers over a span of more than fifty years. Initially a sportswriter, he is primarily known for authoring a social commentary column for the Seattle Post-Intelligencer (P-I) from 1956 until 1982, when he moved to The Seattle Times and continued there as a columnist until shortly before his death in 2001.

Watson grew up in Seattle during the 1920s and 1930s. He was a tireless advocate, through his column as well as through a fictional organization he created called Lesser Seattle, for limiting the seemingly unbridled growth and urban renewal that dramatically altered the city's landscape during the second half of the twentieth century.

== Early life ==
=== Childhood ===
Born in Seattle in 1918, Watson and twin brother Clement were the sons of Garfield and Lena McWhirt. Emmett's mother and twin brother died of Spanish Influenza the following year; his father, an itinerant laborer unable to care for his 14-month-old son, arranged for Emmett's adoption by long-time friends John and Elizabeth Watson of West Seattle.

=== School and baseball ===
Watson suffered an ear infection as a child that permanently damaged his hearing. He attended West Seattle High School before transferring to Franklin. A catcher on the Quakers baseball team, he played with future major league pitcher Fred Hutchinson, and graduated in 1937.

Watson enrolled at the University of Washington and played baseball for the Huskies under head coach Tubby Graves. He played very briefly with the Seattle Rainiers of the Pacific Coast League, amassing one hit in a total of two at-bats. He often blamed his lack of success in professional baseball on his inability to hit a curveball. He graduated from the university in 1942 with a bachelor's degree in communications. After leaving baseball, Watson worked in the Seattle-Tacoma Shipyard during World War II.

=== Early writing career ===
During the war, Watson and some friends produced a newsletter to send to baseball players serving in the military. The newsletter brought him to the attention of an editor at the Seattle Star (a now defunct daily newspaper) where Watson was hired to cover the Rainiers in 1944. It was while working at the Star that Watson contracted polio.

In 1946, The Seattle Times lured Watson away from the Star, where he continued to cover sports until 1950, when he received an offer from the Seattle Post-Intelligencer that The Seattle Times chose not to match. He initially wrote a sports column at the P-I. In 1956 the P-I was pitched the idea of an "Around the Town" column by a group of restaurant owners, who offered to partially underwrite the costs of producing the column in exchange for an occasional plug. The new column, "This, Our Town," was assigned to Watson.

== Columnist at the Seattle Post-Intelligencer ==
Watson's new column quickly broadened its scope to cover all aspects of life in Seattle. In 1959 it was rechristened "This, Our City." By 1962, the column, primarily a "three dot" compilation of short items, was running five days a week. When a particular issue caught his attention, Watson would produce a longer, essay-style column. It was these essay-style columns that provided most of the fodder for his 1993 book, My Life in Print.

In his column and life in general, Watson was an early champion of civil rights, social reform, and the anti-war movement. He denounced urban renewal plans aimed at flattening Pioneer Square and radically altering Seattle's Pike Place Public Market. He was the founder and leader of "Lesser Seattle," a parody of Greater Seattle, Inc., which advocated several schemes for Seattle's civic improvement and development that Watson considered ill-advised. Feeling that the influx of outsiders, primarily from California, was ruining the city, Watson often published tongue-in-cheek columns suggesting ways to make visitors to Seattle feel unwelcome.

In the early 1980s Watson left the P-I after perceived unfair treatment by a new editor, although he still contributed to the paper as a freelancer. Watson's criticisms of then Mariners owner George Argyros eventually led to the P-I reducing the frequency of his column. Watson remembered, "I picked up the paper and saw the column wasn't in there. The managing editor called and said he was thinking of cutting me back to one column a week. I said maybe we should make it zero columns a week." On October 30, 1983, after a hiatus of more than three decades, Watson's column appeared once again in The Seattle Times.

== Columnist at The Seattle Times ==
At The Seattle Times Watson continued to write his column in the style that had made him a well-known fixture of Seattle journalism. As was his custom, he continued to skewer the rich and powerful in his columns, always fighting against the kind of development and modernization that he felt was destroying the city he knew and loved. Over the years the tone in his columns softened somewhat and they often consisted of his reminisces of "Old Seattle." In November 2000, when his union, The Newspaper Guild, went on strike against The Seattle Times, Watson, then in his eighties, made regular, daily appearances on the picket lines. During the strike he wrote for the Seattle Union Record, the strike paper of the Pacific Northwest Newspaper Guild.

== Notable actions ==
=== Reporting the suicide of Ernest Hemingway ===
Watson received international notoriety in 1961 when he broke the story of novelist Ernest Hemingway's suicide in Idaho, which had initially been incorrectly reported by Hemingway's wife as an accidental shooting.

=== Major League Baseball in Seattle ===
Watson and long-time friend U.S. District Judge Bill Dwyer were leaders in the anti-trust suit against Major League Baseball, when the Seattle Pilots were moved to Milwaukee after a single expansion season in Seattle in 1969. It was the effectiveness of this action that proved to be instrumental in Seattle being awarded the Seattle Mariners in 1977.

=== Lesser Seattle ===
Lesser Seattle is a fictional organization invented by Watson. It is also known for its KBO agents and supporters, where KBO stands for "Keep the Bastards Out". The organization expressed Watson's frustration with that of many other Seattle residents with the influx of newcomers to the Puget Sound area from out-of-state. Watson periodically wrote about the group in his column from 1957 to 1997. It was a satirical response to the pro-growth booster group Greater Seattle Inc., which had been founded in the 1950s. The organization is somewhat similar to the satirical James G. Blaine Society and Society of Native Oregon Born (S.N.O.B.) that advocated keeping migrating Californians out of nearby Oregon.

According to Lesser Seattle and the KBO, immigration of newcomers into the Puget Sound region clogged the roads, spent too much money bidding up prices, did not understand the "NorthWest way of life", and generally made trouble. Watson periodically suggested actions that KBO members could take to make "immigrants" (perhaps especially Californians) uncomfortable, and, hopefully, encourage them to leave. Readers and others occasionally observed that it was all a sort of joke; Watson sometimes responded that people could think what they liked, but that he would continue to promote the KBO as one way to deal with the decrease in the quality of life in the Pacific Northwest and especially in Western Washington.

== Oyster Bar ==
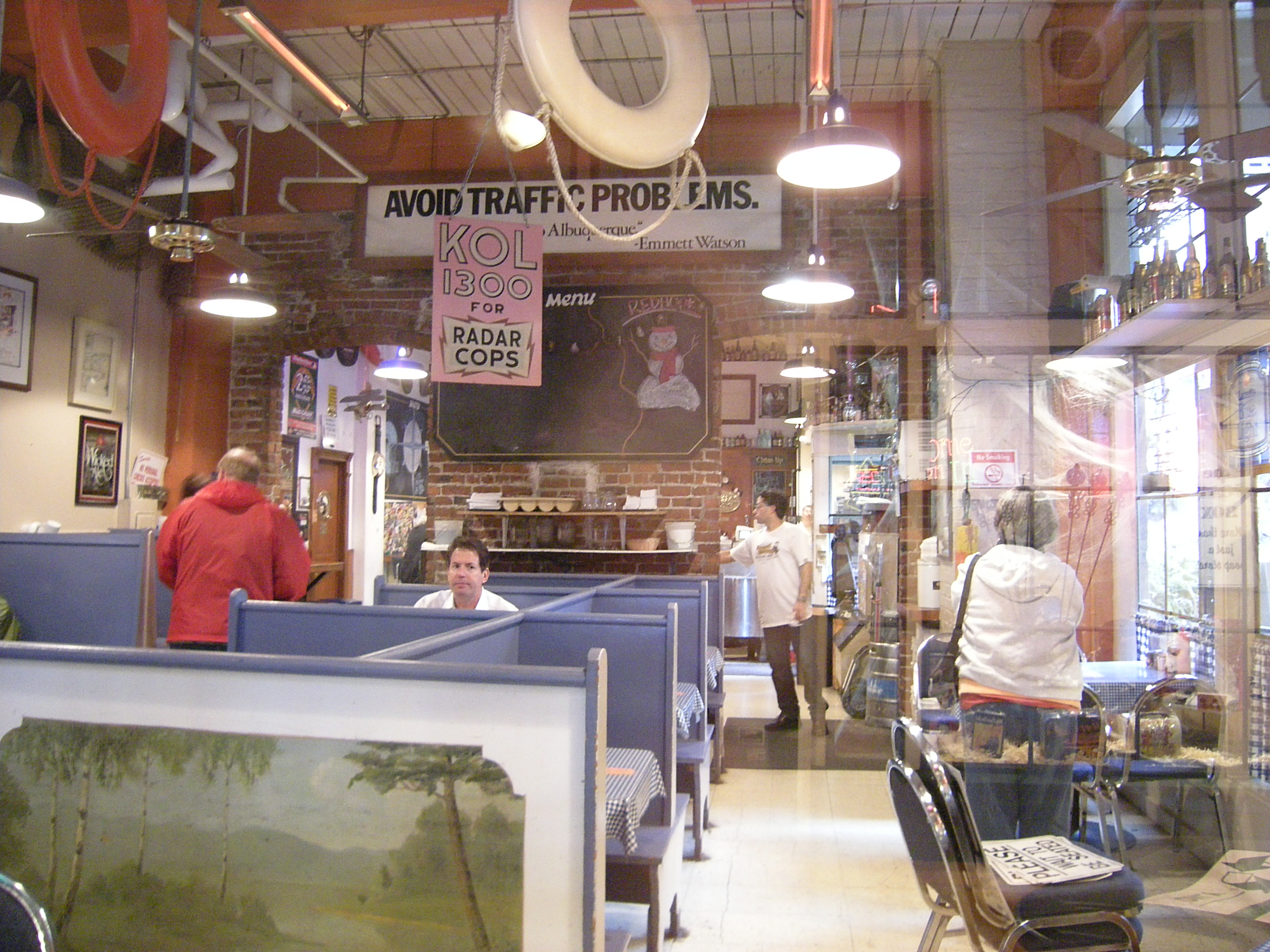
Emmett Watson's Oyster Bar (2008)

Emmett, along with his friend Sam Bryant, opened the city's first oyster bar on February 18, 1979. Watson sold his share of the Oyster Bar to Bryant in 1987. Still in business today, Emmett Watson's Oyster Bar is located in Seattle's Pike Place Market and is currently owned by Sam Bryant's son, Thurman.

== Death ==
In March 2001, Watson underwent surgery for an abdominal aneurysm at Virginia Mason Medical Center in Seattle and died of complications from the surgery on May 11 at the age of 82.

== Accomplishments ==
Watson was called "one of the greats" by contemporaries Herb Caen of the San Francisco Chronicle and Jimmy Breslin of the New York Daily News; he considered himself a protégé of Caen's. He wrote four books (including My Life in Print) and received the Distinguished Service Award from the Society of Professional Journalists' Western Washington Chapter in 1998.

== Published works ==
- 1982 Digressions of a Native Son ISBN 0-9609450-0-8
- 1992 Once Upon a Time in Seattle ISBN 0-9634102-1-0
- 1993 My Life in Print ISBN 0-9634102-2-9
- 1994 Above Seattle (with Robert Cameron, photographer) ISBN 0-918684-41-2

== See also ==
- Fremont Arts Council
- List of oyster bars
