= Alderman (disambiguation) =

An alderman is a member of a municipal assembly or council in many jurisdictions.

Alderman may also refer to:

- Alderman (surname)
- Alderman Lesmond (born 1978), West Indian cricketer
- Alderman Fitzwarren, character in Dick Whittington.

== See also ==
- Alderman House
- Alderman Islands
- Alderman's Green
- Ealdorman
