= Californication (word) =

Portmanteau that criticizes California-style urban sprawl

Californication is a portmanteau of California and fornication, appearing in Time on May 6, 1966 and written about on August 21, 1972, additionally seen on bumper stickers in the U.S. states of Idaho, Washington, Colorado, Oregon, Oklahoma, and Texas.

It was a term popular in the 1970s and referring primarily to the "haphazard, mindless development [of land] that has already gobbled up most of Southern California", which some attributed to an influx of Californians to other states in the Western United States.

== As a popular concept ==
One of the most well-known uses of the word occurs in the Red Hot Chili Peppers's album Californication (1999), which has a song by the same name. The song refers to a Hollywood-driven exportation of culture, with further references to plastic surgery, war, population control, and natural disasters.

The concept is also familiar within the social sciences, and is understood as American cultural imperialism emanating from California.

== Causes ==
Steven Malanga, a fellow at the Manhattan Institute for Policy Research, said that domestic migration from California is mainly driven by high housing costs and taxation rates in the state, citing polls with California residents on their desire to leave. Malanga suggested that migrants from California are likely to trend politically conservative, whereas liberals are less likely to want to leave the state. A New York Times Upshot analysis found that political partisanship, whether intentional or not, plays a powerful role when Americans uproot and find a new home. California has contributed to this trend by exporting Republicans ''en masse'' and more Republicans have moved out of California than any other state and made the states they moved to redder in the process especially Texas, Arizona, Florida and Nevada.

== By state ==
=== Colorado ===
On November 7, 1972, in a statewide referendum, Colorado voters rejected a bond issue to fund the hosting of the 1976 Winter Olympics. The venue for the games would have been spread over 150 miles (240 km) and was widely viewed as a license for unbridled development. As part of the opposition to the bond, the slogan "Don't Californicate Colorado" was coined, appearing on bumper stickers and placards across the state. This rejection by Colorado voters followed a trend in the western states to blame California-style "mindless development" for the urban growth problems experienced in states like Colorado, Montana, New Mexico and Oregon.

=== Idaho ===
Idaho was the fastest-growing state in the 2010s as the city of Boise experienced significant migration from California. Of the roughly 80,000 new Idaho residents in 2016, 17,000 arrived from California. Increased house purchases by out-of-state migrants, especially retirees, led to significant increases in real estate prices in and around Boise. Idaho's appeal to Californians has been attributed to its low cost of living and high quality of life.

=== Oregon ===
Californication as a pejorative was a culmination of sentiments known in the 1940s, typified by Stewart Holbrook, author and Oregonian columnist, who campaigned through the fictitious James G. Blaine Society against development and unchecked population growth. Similar groups—such as The Miller Society—jokingly promoted measures like building a 16-foot (4.9 m) tall fence all along Interstate 5 to prevent exiting between California and Washington, expelling non-native Oregon-born residents, and instituting a $5000 immigration fee.

In 1965, Eugene's first planning commission began to question decades of promotion by chambers of commerce and developers. It referred to a 1959 pro-growth development plan and rampant road building as "All the way to San Jose"—an allusion to freeways' decreasing neighborhood livability. Interstate 5 from California was completed the year before. Previously, the main route into Oregon from California was through twisty, two-lane U.S. Route 99.

Governor Tom McCall was interviewed by Terry Drinkwater and appeared on national television January 12, 1971, for his acclaimed conservation experience. Extemporaneously he said, "Come visit us again and again. But for heaven's sake, don't come here to live." Soon, bumper stickers that discouraged migration to Oregon were widely seen: "The famous radioactive vapors of the Columbia River will get you!", and "Oregonians don't tan; they rust". The banner "Don't Californicate Oregon" became the symbol of James Cloutier's line of "Oregon Ungreeting Cards", which carried sentiments such as "Tom Lawson McCall, governor, on behalf of the citizens of the great state of Oregon, cordially invites you to visit... Washington or California or Idaho or Nevada or Afghanistan".

=== Washington ===
Seattle Times columnist Emmett Watson remarked in a 1989 piece on Lesser Seattle that the "invasion of California nitwits to the Northwest" had reached "epidemic" proportions.

== See also ==
- Brusselization
- Internal colonialism
- Manhattanization
- Urban sprawl
