= Society of Red Tape Cutters =

Small articles published by newspapers during World War II

The illustrated certificate for Franklin D. Roosevelt

The Society of Red Tape Cutters was a series of small articles published by newspapers during World War II to give recognition to military and political figures for keeping bureaucracy from hindering the war effort. Each announcement included a boilerplate "certificate" illustrated by Dr. Seuss and a synopsis of the inductee's actions.

== Recipients ==
- President Franklin Delano Roosevelt
- Vice President Harry S. Truman
- Admiral Chester Nimitz
- Russian Commissar Vyacheslav Molotov
- Secretary of State Cordell Hull
- Admiral Ernest King
- Elmer Davis, director of the United States Office of War Information
- Fiorello H. LaGuardia, mayor of New York City
- Claire Lee Chennault, commander of the Flying Tigers
