= Lockridge =

Lockridge may refer to:

== People ==
- Cam Lockridge, American football player
- Hildegarde Dolson Lockridge (1908–1981) American poet, playwright and novelist
- Richard Lockridge (1899–1982), American writer of detective fiction
- Rocky Lockridge (1959–2019), American former professional boxer
- Ross Lockridge Jr. (1914–1948), American novelist
- S. M. Lockridge (1913–2000), American pastor

== Places ==
- Lockridge, Iowa, United States
- Lockridge, Western Australia

== See also ==
- Lockeridge, Wiltshire, England
