= Landmark Books =

Landmark Books may refer to:

- Landmark Books (publisher)
- Landmark Books (series)
- Landmark Bookstores
- Landmark Ancient Histories series

== See also ==
- Landmark Worldwide
