= Alderman (surname) =

Alderman is a surname. Notable people with the surname include:

- Albert Alderman (1907–1990), English cricketer
- Clifford Lindsey Alderman (1902–1988), American historical novelist
- Edwin Alderman (1861–1931), American academic and president of three universities (notably UVA, where he served for 27 years)
- Fred Alderman (1905–1998), American athlete
- Geoffrey Alderman (born 1944), British historian
- George P. B. Alderman (1862–1942), American architect
- Grace Alderman (1885 – 1968), British suffragette
- Grady Alderman (1938–2018), American footballer
- Jack Alderman (1956–2008), American criminal
- Jacob Alderman, elected Mayor of London in 1216
- James Alderman (died 1929), American alcohol smuggler
- James E. Alderman (1936–2021), American judge
- John Alderman (17th century), American assassin
- Kemp Alderman (born 2002), American professional baseball player
- Naomi Alderman (born 1974), British author and novelist
- Pauline Alderman (1893–1983), American musicologist and composer
- Terry Alderman (born 1956), Australian cricketer
- Solomon Flagg Alderman (1861–1928), American lawyer and politician

== Fictional characters ==
- Ariel Alderman, a character in the television series Nip/Tuck
