= A. B. C. Whipple =

American journalist, editor, historian (1918–2013)

A.B.C. "Cal" Whipple
- "Cal" Whipple
- Born: Addison Beecher Colvin Whipple; July 15, 1918; Glen Falls, New York, U.S.
- Died: March 17, 2013 (aged 94); Greenwich, Connecticut, U.S.
- Education: Loomis; Yale University; Harvard University
- Occupations: War Correspondent, Writer and Historian
- Writing career
- Period: 1941–1994
- Genre: History
- Subjects: Military History Editor, Maritime History

Addison Beecher Colvin ("Cal") Whipple (July 15, 1918 – March 17, 2013) was an American journalist, editor, historian and author. He was born in Glens Falls, New York, on July 15, 1918, and spent most of his childhood in Suffield, Connecticut. He graduated from the Loomis School, from Yale University in 1940 and received an M.A. from Harvard University before being hired by Life Magazine. He had many positions at Time/Life and wrote a number of books about maritime history.

== Helped lift censorship rules ==
Whipple was a Washington correspondent for Life magazine in 1943, assigned to the new Pentagon, when photographer George Strock returned from New Guinea in January 1943 with photographs that included an image of three dead American soldiers on a beach during the Battle of Buna-Gona. The photograph could not be published because the U.S Office of Censorship only permitted the media to publish images of blanket-covered bodies and flag-draped coffins of dead U.S. soldiers. for fear of "damaging morale on the home front." "I went from army captain to major to colonel to general," Whipple recalled, "until I wound up in the office of an Assistant Secretary of the Air Corps, who decided, 'This has to go to the White House.'"

Elmer Davis, Director of the United States Office of War Information, felt the censorship rules should be loosened. He persuaded President Franklin D. Roosevelt to lift the restrictions on images of dead soldiers. Life finally published Strock's photograph on September 20, 1943. Strock's image was the first photograph to depict American soldiers dead on the battlefield. It was accompanied by a full page editorial explaining why the editors felt the image merited publication.

The impact of images like Strock's was mixed. War bond sales increased but enlistments went down. The image provoked considerable controversy. Some readers attacked Life for exposing the public to more information about the war than they were prepared for, or for engaging in "morbid sensationalism." Censorship was loosened, but the media was still forbidden from showing the faces of the dead or the insignia of the units they belonged to.

== Other work at Life ==
At Life, Whipple helped edit the memoirs of General Douglas MacArthur and Winston Churchill. He also worked closely with such authors as James Jones, Walter Lord and Rachel Carson. Whipple was later a writer, editor of Life's International Editions and executive editor of Time-Life Books. He retired in 1975.

He wrote more than a dozen books about maritime history. His study of the clipper ship era, The Challenge, won Honorable Mention as a John Lyman Book Award. Whipple taught at the Harvard-Radcliffe Publishing Procedures Course, and was a member of the editorial board of the Harper's Dictionary of Contemporary English Usage.

== Selected list of works ==
- Yankee Whalers in the South Seas (1954)
- Pirate: Rascals of the Spanish Main (1957)
- Tall Ships and Great Captains: A Narrative of Famous Sailing Ships Through the Ages and the Courageous Men Who Sailed, Fought, or Raced Them Across the Seas (1960)
- Hero of Trafalgar: The Story of Lord Nelson (1963)
- The Fatal Gift of Beauty: The Final Years of Byron and Shelley (1964)
- All About Nelson (1966)
- The Mysterious Voyage of Captain Kidd (1970)
- Fighting Sail (The Seafarers Series - Time Life Books)(1978)
- Vintage Nantucket (1978)
- The Whalers (The Seafarers Series - Time Life Books) (1978)
- The Whalers (1979)
- The Racing Yachts (The Seafarers Series - Time Life Books) (1980)
- The Clipper Ships (1980)
- The Mediterranean (1981)
- Storm (Planet Earth Series - Time Life Books) (1982)
- World War II in the Mediterranean - (Time Life Books) (1982)
- Restless Ocean (Planet Earth Series - Time Life Books) (1983)
- The Challenge (1987)
- To the Shores of Tripoli: The Birth of the U.S. Navy and Marines (1991)
- Critters: Adventures in Wildest Suburbia (1994)
