= Emmett Watson's Oyster Bar =

Seafood restaurant in Seattle, Washington, U.S.

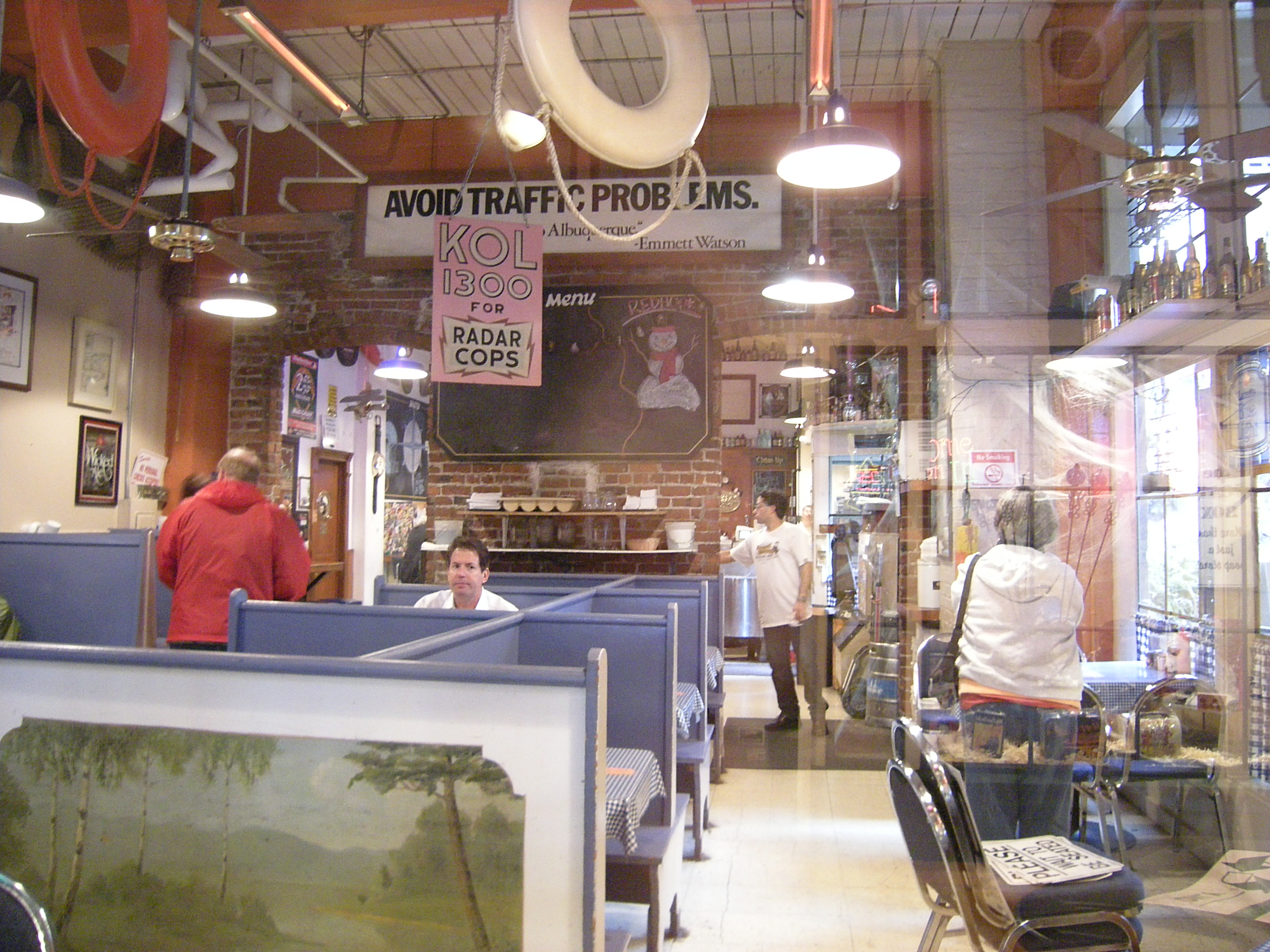
- The restaurant's interior, 2008
- Interactive map of Emmett Watson's Oyster Bar

Restaurant information
- Location: Seattle, Washington, United States
- Coordinates: 47.6101°N 122.3427°W
- Website: emmettwatsonsoysterbar.com

Emmett Watson's Oyster Bar is a seafood restaurant in Seattle's Pike Place Market, in the U.S. state of Washington. Seattle journalist Emmett Watson and his friend Sam Bryant opened the city's first oyster bar on February 18, 1979. The restaurant is now operated by Bryant's son Thurman.

== See also ==
- List of James Beard America's Classics
- List of oyster bars
- List of restaurants in Pike Place Market
- List of restaurants in Seattle
- List of seafood restaurants
