= George Strock =

World War II photojournalist

George A. Strock
- George Strock poses behind his camera.
- Born: July 3, 1911; Dyersville, Iowa, US
- Died: August 23, 1977 (aged 66); Los Angeles, California, US
- Education: John C. Fremont High School
- Occupation: Photojournalist
- Employer: Life
- Known for: War photography; First photo of dead GIs on the battlefield published in World War II
- Spouse: Rose Marie

George Strock (July 3, 1911 – August 23, 1977) was an American photojournalist active during World War II. He is most famously known for his photograph of three American soldiers who were killed during the Battle of Buna-Gona on Buna Beach. It became the first published photograph to depict dead American troops on the battlefield during World War II.

Strock got his start as a photographer while studying photojournalism at the John C. Fremont High School in Los Angeles. After high school, Strock photographed Hollywood celebrities, crime and sports for the Los Angeles Times before joining Life magazine in 1940.

== Early life ==
Strock was born in Dyersville, Iowa to William L. and Mary R. Lippert Strock. He had a brother, Edward. Before 1925, the family moved to Los Angeles. Strock attended John C. Fremont High School in South Central Los Angeles where he studied photojournalism under Clarence A. Bach, who had begun teaching the first such course in the United States in 1924. Strock graduated from high school in 1928.

In 1931, at age 21, he worked alongside his brother in their father's battery business. In 1936, according to the Los Angeles city directory, he was listed as residing with his parents and brother Edward at 328 W. 102nd Ave, but his occupation was now listed as "cameraman". Strock operated an amusement pier photograph concession and a baby portrait studio. By 1938, he was working for the Los Angeles Times where he covered sports, movies, and politics. In 1939, he was listed as a photographer for Modern Screen magazine. He shot images of the military at Fort Dix and Pensacola Naval Air Station, as well as everyday civilian life.

He married his wife, Rose Marie, around 1937–1938, and they had two sons, George and William.

== World War II coverage ==
Private Charles Teed, a "typical draftee" in his home town. Featured on the cover of Life on March 16, 1942.

After the attack on Pearl Harbor the Time/Life bureau in Los Angeles was short-handed and needed additional photographers. Fellow Fremont High graduate and photographer Dick Pollard referred Strock, and Life began giving him assignments. When Life needed additional photographers, Strock referred Bob Landry, who suggested other graduates of Fremont High, and over the course of the war a total of 146 of Bach's students became wartime photographers.

After he was hired full-time, Strock was sent to the European front where he covered the Vichy French for a short while. He was known to drink excessively, and in 1942, after returning to the United States, he was assigned to join a convoy departing San Francisco for Australia. When he failed to appear, friends searched his favorite Los Angeles bars near his home in Hollywood without success. A day after the convoy sailed, an executive for the Union Pacific Railroad received a letter of commendation for a bartender aboard the train City of San Francisco from Strock, who had somehow sailed with the convoy.

He was assigned by Life to the Southwest Pacific Area of World War II. He covered the Battle of Buna-Gona from November 1942 to January 1943. Strock was nearly killed at least twice during his assignment on New Guinea in late 1942 and early 1943. “When I took pictures, I wanted to bring the viewer into the scene,” Mr. Strock told an interviewer. In one instance, he took a timed exposure of an apparently dead Japanese soldier in a coconut log bunker. After taking a second picture, a shot rang out from behind him.

I turned around. "What are you shooting at?" I asked one of the officers. "The bastard sat up and was blinking his eyes," he said. "And it was this very guy that I had photographed. He had concealed a hand-grenade in his left hand. I didn’t notice, but the picture showed that he had it. He sat up and was going to clobber me, and the officer shot him."

In late January, 1943, Strock left Port Moresby with his negatives for Honolulu, but his plane was temporarily delayed when one of its propellers struck a tree upon takeoff. The plane landed and mechanics removed debris from the engine before the plane took off again. He arrived in San Francisco at Hamilton Field on January 30, 1943.

Strock's coverage of the Battle of Buna-Gona was published by Life on February 15 and 22, 1943, within a month of the battle's conclusion on January 22. It included pictures of U.S. soldiers on the battlefield and images of dead Japanese soldiers. But images that Strock took of dead American GIs on the battlefield were not published because the U.S Office of Censorship prohibited their use. Life editorialized that "we think that occasional pictures of Americans who fall in action should be printed. The job of men like Strock is to bring the war back to us, so that we who are thousands of miles removed from the dangers and the smell of death may know what is at stake."

Strock later covered the battle to capture Kwajalein Atoll and Enewetok Atoll during Gilbert and Marshall Islands campaign during February 1944. and after the war continued to work for Life. Strock's images were featured on the cover of Life a number of times.

== Picture of dead GIs ==
"Three dead Americans lie on the beach at Buna." Taken on December 31, 1942 or on January 1 or 2, 1943. This was the first photograph published in the United States that depicted American soldiers dead on the battlefield. Due to the number of dead bodies on the beach, the Allies nicknamed it "Maggot Beach".

=== Date of photograph ===
An image of three dead U.S. servicemen lying in the sand of Buna beach was taken by George Strock on either 31 December 1942 or on January 1 or 2, 1943, when Buna was captured. It is sometimes described as having been taken in February 1943, because Life published other images from the battle on February 15, almost a month after it ended on January 22. The proof sheets for the images are titled "Buna-Gona Campaign, New Guinea, '42", indicating the images were taken during the campaign's initial phase in November and December 1942.

=== Life overcomes censorship ===
Up until this time, the U.S. Office of Censorship only permitted the media to publish images of blanket-covered bodies and flag-draped coffins of dead U.S. soldiers. The government also restricted what reporters could write, and coverage was generally upbeat and bloodless.

The editor of the Christian Science Monitor felt that the government rules to "hold back and play down American casualties" gave the American public an artificially optimistic view of the war's progress. In Australia, General Douglas MacArthur threatened to court-martial any soldier who gave a correspondent an interview without official permission. Life Washington correspondent Cal Whipple felt that Strock's photograph was needed to inject a dose of reality on the home front which he thought was growing complacent about the war effort. Whipple said, “I went from army captain to major to colonel to general, until I wound up in the office of an Assistant Secretary of the Air Corps, who decided, ‘This has to go to the White House.’”

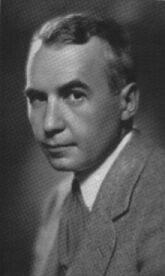
Elmer Davis, Director of the United States Office of War Information, was instrumental in lifting the ban on publishing images of dead soldiers.

Elmer Davis, Director of the Office of War Information, believed that the American public "had a right to be truthfully informed" about the war within the dictates of military security. Davis asked President Roosevelt to lift the ban on publishing photographs of dead American soldiers on the battlefield. Roosevelt agreed and authorized publication of Strock's image and others. Censorship was loosened, but the media were still forbidden to show the faces of the dead or the insignia of their units.

Life finally published Strock's photograph on September 20, 1943. Strock's image was the first photograph to depict American soldiers dead on the battlefield since the attack on Pearl Harbor 21 months before. It was accompanied by a full page editorial explaining why the editors felt the image merited publication.

...Why print this picture, anyway, of three American boys dead upon an alien shore? Is it to hurt people? To be morbid? Those are not the reasons. The reason is that words are never enough.... Well, this is the picture. And the reason we print it now is that, last week, President Roosevelt and Elmer Davis and the War Department decided that the American people ought to be able to see their own boys as they fall in battle; to come directly and without words into the presence of their own dead... This is the reality that lies behind the names that come to rest at last on monuments in the leafy squares of busy American towns. The camera doesn’t show America and yet here on the beach is America, three parts of a hundred and thirty million parts, three fragments of that life we call American life: three units of freedom. So that it is not just these boys who have fallen here, it is freedom that has fallen. It is our task to cause it to rise again...."

The image was republished on the cover of Yank, the U.S. Army newsweekly, on November 5, 1943. They proclaimed that the photograph was necessary to "give the over-optimistic and complacent American public a more realistic picture of the war."

=== Reception ===
The impact of images like Strock's was mixed. The image provoked considerable controversy. Some readers attacked Life for exposing the public to more information about the war than they were prepared for, or for engaging in "morbid sensationalism." The picture improved War bond sales but negatively affected enlistments. The image was described as a "stark depiction of the stillness of death, and then shocking when it became clear on second glance that maggots had claimed the body of one soldier, face down in the sand." Strock's photograph has been described as one of the "most famous and influential photographs ever taken in any war." It became a classic image of war photography.

== Post-war ==
In 1955 Strock's photograph of a couple courting in a crowded, overheated bar was selected by Edward Steichen for the world-touring Museum of Modern Art exhibition The Family of Man, that was seen by 9 million visitors.

Strock died in Los Angeles on August 23, 1977.
