= Nancy Wilson Ross =

American novelist

Nancy Wilson Ross (November 22, 1901 – January 18, 1986) was an American novelist. A native of Olympia, Washington who graduated from the University of Oregon in 1924, she became an expert in Eastern religions and wrote fifteen novels. Her 1957 novel The Return of Lady Brace was nominated for the National Book Award for Fiction.

== Books ==
- Friday to Monday (1932)
- Take the Lightning (1940)
- The Farthest Reach (1941)
- Westward the Women (1944)
- The Left Hand Is the Dreamer (1947)
- I, My Ancestor (1950)
- Joan of Arc (1952)
- Time's Corner (1952)
- The Return of Lady Brace (1957)
- Thor's Visit to the Land of Giants (1959)
- Heroines of the Early West (1960)
- The World of Zen: an East-West Anthology (1960)
- Three Ways of Asian Wisdom (1966)
- Buddhism, a Way of Life and Thought (1980)
