= William Johnson (historian) =

American journalist and historian

William Weber Johnson (1909–1992) was an American journalist, historian and writer whose work focused on the Old West and Mexico.

Johnson worked as a journalist for a local paper in Illinois before working for the Associated Press in Chicago and Detroit. He joined Time Life in 1941. During World War II, Johnson worked as a war correspondent for Time embedded with British troops following D-Day. He later served as bureau chief in various places in and outside the United States, notably in Mexico.

Johnson was well known for his interest in writer B. Traven and the Online Archive of California maintains a "Guide to the William W. Johnson collection on B. Traven".

He is the author of eleven books, one of which, Mexico, was translated in fourteen languages and sold millions of copies.

Johnson received a Guggenheim Fellowship in 1958.
