= James Cloutier =

American illustrator, cartoonist, and graphic designer

James Cloutier (born circa 1938) is an American illustrator, cartoonist, and graphic designer, best known for his humorous cartoon illustrations that both celebrate and poke fun at the culture of Oregon.

== Biography ==
Cloutier was born in Portland and attended high school there. He spent two years in the Navy then came to the University of Oregon (UO) in Eugene on a baseball scholarship in 1958; he also studied art. While on a summer break from college, he traveled to Ethiopia to build classrooms. After graduation, because of his love for Africa, he returned there as a member of the first Peace Corps group in Kenya. He returned to the UO to study photography through the journalism school as the UO's MFA program did not include photography. He received his MFA in photography in 1969, one of the first two students at the UO to do so. For his terminal project, he produced a notable book of photographs about the small town of Alpine, Oregon: Alpine Tavern: Photographs of a Social Gathering Place.

In 1972 he began producing "Oregon Ungreeting Cards" with Frank Beeson. The card company was inspired by the popularity of the sentiments expressed by Governor Tom McCall regarding an influx of out-of-state migration to Oregon. The cards both poked fun at Oregon culture and humorously discouraged newcomers by exaggerating, among other things, how much it rained in the state. One of the more popular slogans on the company's cards, shirts, and bags was "Oregonians don't tan, they rust."

In the 1980s he founded the Image West Press to publish his popular "Orygone" cartoon books which include Orygone III: Or, Everything you always wanted to know about Oregon, but were afraid to find out. (1977), Orygone IV (1978), Orygone Too (1980), The Best of Orygun (1982), and Orygone I (1984). The naming of the series is a parody of photographer Ray Atkeson's popular coffee table books. Cloutier's first Orygone book, Orygone III, was published before the third book in Atkeson's series, Oregon III.

Cloutier lives in Eugene. In 2006, he painted a mural on the side of the St. Vincent dePaul Society's First Place Family Shelter in Eugene.

== Hugh Wetshoe ==
Hugh Wetshoe is Cloutier's cartoon character who is featured in the illustrations of the Oregon Ungreeting Card Co. and Cloutier's "Orygone" book series.

== Society of Native Oregon Born (S.N.O.B.) ==
The Society of Native Oregon Born (S.N.O.B.) was founded in the late 1970s by the Oregon-born Cloutier when he learned that more than half the state's residents had not been born there. He developed a logo for the organization and began selling memberships, which included a certificate, a membership card, and a decal. More than 5,000 Oregonians signed up, including Governor Vic Atiyeh. After Cloutier's mother revealed that she had actually been born in Washington, he created an honorary membership category for people who had lived in Oregon at least 50 years. Although the group was intended to be humorous, people took it seriously and would hold annual picnics at Champoeg State Park. He stopped selling memberships after about nine years, but according to Cloutier's website, he is interested in reviving the organization.

== See also ==
- Californication (word)
- James G. Blaine Society
