= Anne Terry White =

American writer

Anne Terry White (February 19, 1896 – July 1980) was a Russian-born American writer and translator.

The daughter of Aaron and Sarah Terry, she was born Anne Terry in the Russian Empire, and came to the United States with her family at the age of 8. She was educated at Brown University and obtained a master's degree from Stanford University in 1925. She worked as a teacher and social worker. Besides writing books for young people, she also translated works for children from Russian to English.

In 1918, she married Harry Dexter White; the couple had two daughters.

In 1937, she published Heroes of the Five Books about characters from the Old Testament, her first book. Her books were primarily non-fiction on a variety of subjects, including archaeology, anthropology, other various scientific topics and biographies. She also published adaptations of myths, fairy tales and classic children's literature.

== Selected works ==
- Three Children and Shakespeare (1938)
- Lost Worlds: Adventures in Archaeology (1941)
- Men Before Adam (1942)
- Prehistoric America, Landmark Books Series published by Random House (1951)
- George Washington Carver: The Story of a Great American (1953)
- All About the Stars (1954)
- All About Great Rivers of the World (1957)
- Rocks All Around Us (1959)
- Birds of the World (1962)
- The American Indian (1963)
- With Dersu the Hunter: Adventures in the Taiga (1965) adapted from a work by Vladimir Arsenyev
- (with G. S. Lietz): Man, the Thinker (1967)
- North to Liberty: The Story of the Underground Railroad (1972)
