= Monroe Stearns =

American historian, writer, translator

- Born: September 28, 1913; Connecticut, United States
- Died: December 1, 1987 (aged 74); New York City, United States
- Occupations: art historian, writer
- Known for: translator of French novels, editor of children's verse
- Notable work: see list of works and translations

Monroe Mather Stearns (September 28, 1913 – December 1, 1987) was an American art historian, writer, translator of French novels, editor, and collector of children's verse. Along with work as an editor at Prentice Hall, Stearns also translated French World War II and Jewish historical sources such as by Michael Bar-Zohar.

Stearns was born in Connecticut and died in New York City.

== Works ==
- Ring A Ling collection of children's verse (Artia, 1959)
- Dante - Poet of Love
- Julius Caesar: Master of Men
- The Story of New England (Random House, 1967)
- Shays' Rebellion (Watts, 1968)
- The Great Awakening (Watts, 1970)

== Translations ==
- Marcel Haedrich La Rose Et Les Soldats. The Soldier and the Rose, 1963
- Sergeanne Golon Angélique Et Le Roy. Angélique and the King. 1960
- Paule Cloutier Daveluy L'Été Enchanté. Summer in Ville-Marie 1963
- Serge and Anne Golon Indomptable Angélique. Angélique and the Sultan. 1961
- Beate Klarsfeld Partout ou ils seront. Wherever they may be! translated by Monroe Stearns and Natalie Gerardi. New York: Vanguard Press, 1975.
- Michael Bar-Zohar Embassies in Crisis: Diplomats and Demagogues behind the Six-Day War. Translated from the French by Monroe Stearns.
