= James G. Blaine Society =

Unofficial organization

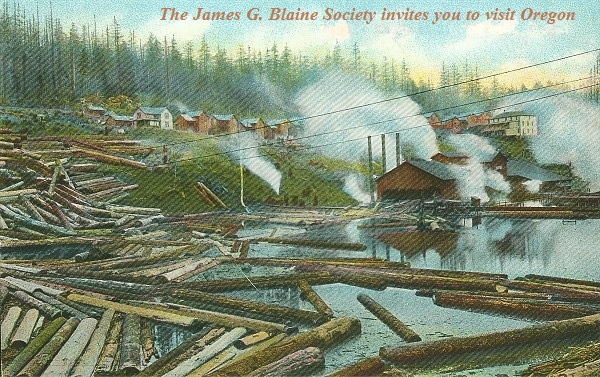
- James G. Blaine Society promotion of Oregon
- Formation: Early 1960s
- Type: Unofficial organization (self-identifying group)
- Headquarters: None
- Members: Unknown
- Leader: None

The James G. Blaine Society is an unofficial organization dedicated to protecting the U.S. state of Oregon from overpopulation. It was founded in the early 1960s by writer Stewart Holbrook. The goal of the society is to discourage people from immigrating to Oregon. The society is named after James G. Blaine, a United States senator from Maine, because he never visited Oregon. The society has no organization, leaders, membership roster, meetings, or dues. However, the society was often mentioned in media articles about population growth in Oregon during the 1970s and 1980s.

== Founding ==
The James G. Blaine Society was founded in the early 1960s by Stewart Holbrook, an author and journalist who wrote a regular column for The Oregonian. Holbrook wrote in a humorous blue-collar style that was very popular with readers. As a result, his career as a feature writer for The Oregonian lasted thirty-six years. Holbrook was also a well-known conservationist and advocate of sustained yield forestry. He was particularly concerned about Oregon's rapid population growth in the 1960s and the impact of unplanned development on the state's environment.

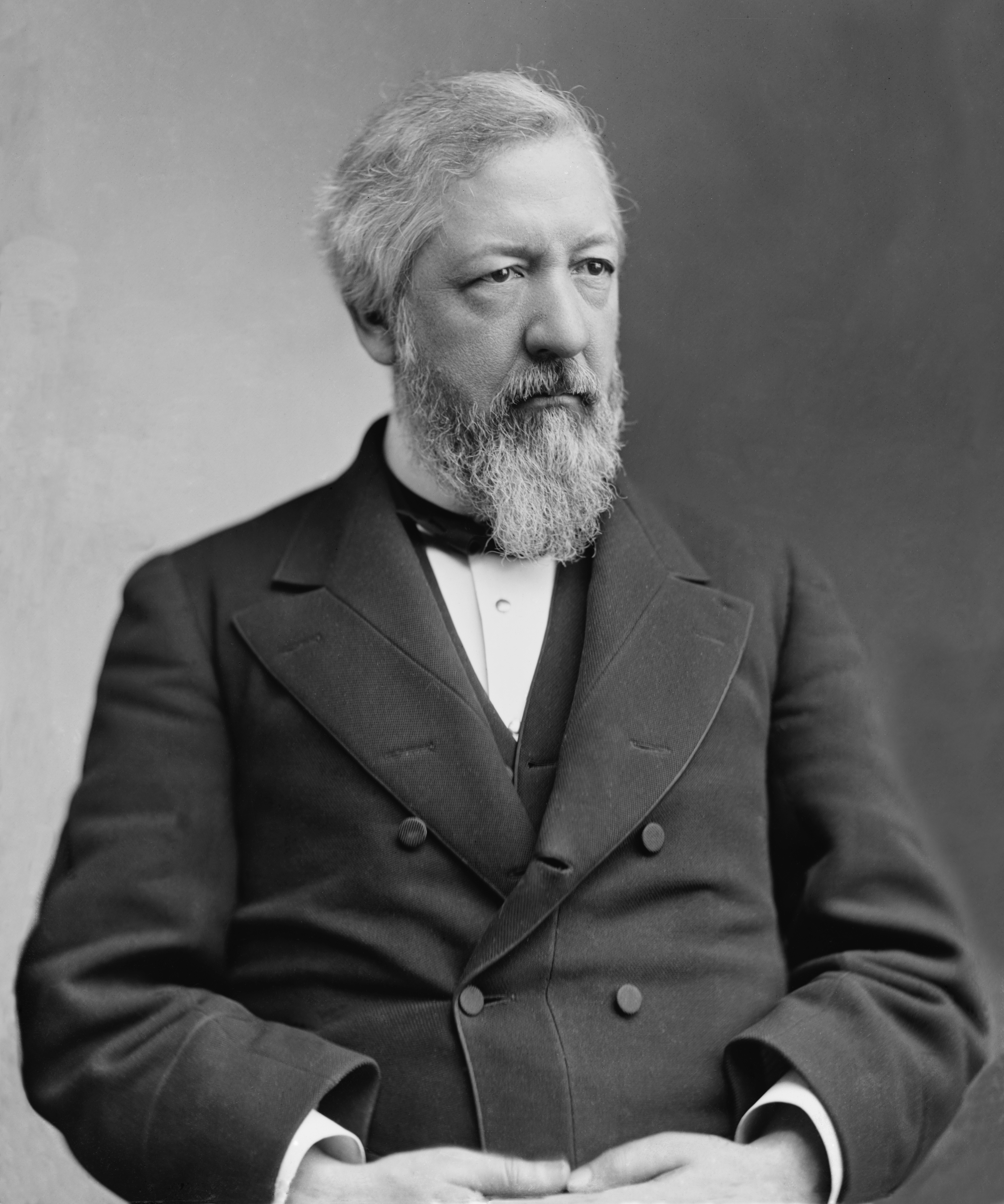
Blaine is the society's figurehead, because he never visited Oregon.

To highlight his concerns about Oregon's population growth and related issues, Holbrook created the fictional James G. Blaine Society. He highlighted its purpose in a humorous article in the 27 March 1962 edition of Look magazine, originally calling the organization the James G. Blaine Association.

The organization was named after James G. Blaine, a U.S. representative and senator from Maine and perennial presidential candidate, because the senator never visited Oregon. In fact, during his 1884 presidential campaign, Blaine visited every state in the union except Oregon. The society was named in Blaine's honor to encourage others to follow his example of avoiding Oregon.

Sharing Holbrook's concern that Oregon's rapidly growing population would have a negative impact on the state's environment, a significant number of Oregonians came to identify themselves as members of the James G. Blaine Society. Over time, the society took on a life of its own despite the fact that it had no formal organization, no leaders, no membership roster, held no meetings, and collected no dues. The society's members were self-identified and generally good natured about their isolationist views. However, the success of this tongue-in-cheek group underscored real concerns within the state for issues arising from rapid and uncontrolled population growth.

== Come visit, but don't stay ==
After Holbrook's death in 1964, Oregon author Ralph Friedman became the champion of the James G. Blaine Society for a short period. While his book Oregon for the Curious captured the state's unique character, it was also a book some considered an advertisement for Oregon immigration. Friedman prepared a form letter to counter that impression. The letter read in part:

Oregon is a lovely place to visit, but it is a mess to live in. After the tourists have left, it rains like crazy here. Mosquitoes are big as Sherman tanks. The people are unfriendly... and most of us are starving... Our freeways are jammed tighter than scorched rice pudding. Our smog is awful... some days you can't see from Molalla to Silverton. Fuel bills are so high most people just build igloos in the back yard and spend the winter there... There are no fish in the streams... and nobody has seen a rose around here for years. Actually what happens in the summer when tourists come is that we paint our hills green, put up false silhouettes for mountains, borrow a few lakes from Washington and California, and hire some actors to look cheerful. So... spread the word. Oregon is a great place to visit, but no place to call home.

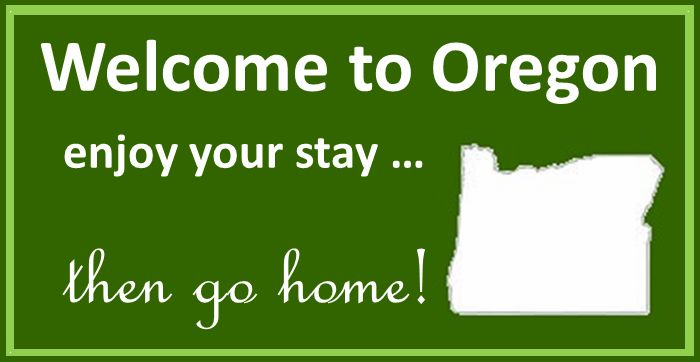
James G. Blaine Society ungreeting sign

In 1971, the James G. Blaine Society got a big boost when Governor Tom McCall invited tourists to visit Oregon, but then added "but for heaven's sake don't stay." This public remark got national press coverage, and was even aired on the CBS Evening News. The governor's remarks also created a demand for Oregon ungreeting cards, which were popular for many years. The most famous ungreeting card read: "Governor Tom Lawson McCall, on behalf of the citizens of the Great State of Oregon, cordially invites you to visit ...Washington, California, Idaho, Nevada, or Afghanistan..." The sale of bumper stickers with phrases like "Don't Californicate Oregon" also became popular across the state in the 1970s. The governor's "come visit, but don't stay" remark as well as the ungreeting cards and bumper stickers articulated the values of the James G. Blaine Society.

In the early 1970s, a freelance writer from Portland named Ron Abell made an attempt to officially organize the James G. Blaine Society. Abell incorporated the society and issued membership cards. However, only a small number of people actually paid to join. As the society's unofficial president and self-appointed spokesman, Abell received regular media coverage throughout the state. In his speeches, Abell often highlighted the rain in western Oregon and the dry desert heat of eastern Oregon with comments like: "We had a good summer last year. It came on a Sunday so lots of people got to enjoy it." As the subject of numerous articles in local and national publications, Abell eventually got more publicity than he wanted and he tried to disconnect himself from media coverage of the society.

== Heritage ==
In 1970, an article in Smithsonian magazine estimated that most Oregon residents claimed membership in the James G. Blaine Society. The article also speculated that the "James G. Blaine Society may end up as the most popular organization ever to come on the Oregon scene." By the end of the 1980s, media interest in the James G. Blaine Society began to wane. Today, few outside the state are even aware of the society; however, many Oregonians are still familiar with the James G. Blaine Society and media articles occasionally mention the society. While it has generally disappeared from public view, the James G. Blaine Society remains a part of Oregon history and culture.

The Oregon Historical Society research library maintains a collection of society documents contributed by Ron Abell. The collection includes society related correspondence, membership lists, and newspaper reports.

== Society slogans ==
- Come visit Oregon, but don't stay
- Don't Californicate Oregon
- See Oregon and then go home
- Keep Oregon green, clean, and lean
- Oregon for Oregonians
- When it's summer in Oregon the rain gets warmer
- You don't tan in Oregon, you rust
- The enemy flag comes in the colors of an out-of-state license plate
- Oregon—small, crowded, polluted...economy failing...cost of living soaring

== See also ==
- James Cloutier, founder of the Society of Native Oregon Born (S.N.O.B.)
