= Alderman House =

Historic house in Florida, United States

- U.S. National Register of Historic Places

- Location within Florida
- Location: 2572 East First Street, Fort Myers, Florida
- Coordinates: 26°38′54″N 81°51′43″W
- Area: less than one acre
- Built: 1925
- Architectural style: Spanish Colonial Revival
- NRHP reference No.: 88002690
- Added to NRHP: December 1, 1988

The Alderman House (also known as the Royal Palm Antiques) is a historic house located at 2572 East First Street in Fort Myers, Florida. It is locally significant as an excellent example of the Mediterranean Revival style architecture in Fort Myers during the Florida Land Boom of the 1920s.

== Description and history ==
The stuccoed 2 1/2-story house was completed in 1925 in the Mediterranean Revival/Spanish Colonial Revival style of architecture. The house is currently a wedding and events venue.

On December 1, 1988, it was added to the U.S. National Register of Historic Places.
