= Stewart Holbrook =

American journalist

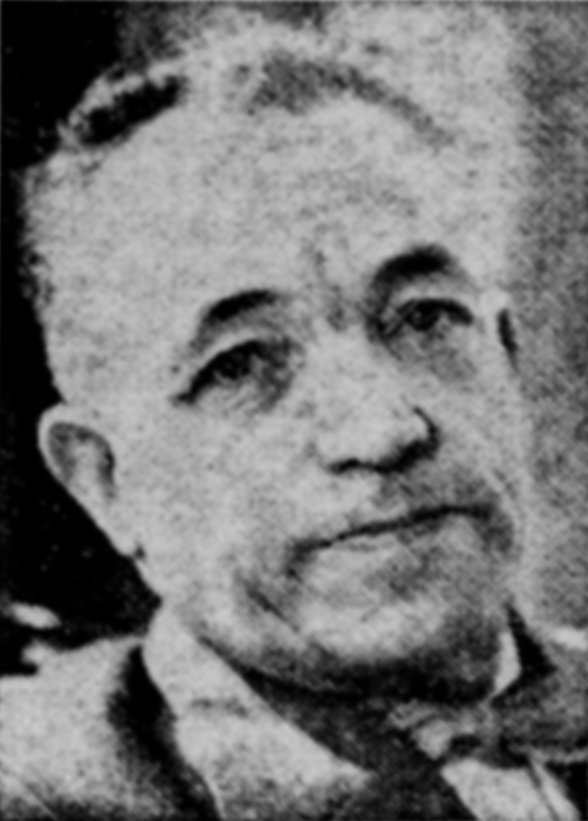
Stewart Holbrook in the 1950s

Stewart Hall Holbrook (1893–1964) was an American logger, writer, and popular historian. His writings focused on what he called the "Far Corner": Washington, Oregon, and Idaho. A self-proclaimed "low-brow" historian, his topics included Ethan Allen, the railroads, the timber industry, the Wobblies, and eccentrics of the Pacific Northwest. An early proponent of conservationism, Holbrook believed that Oregon's growing population would damage the state's environment.

== Career ==
Holbrook was a logger before he moved to Portland, Oregon, in 1923, when he was 30 years old and became a very accomplished writer. He wrote for The Oregonian for over thirty years, was featured in The New Yorker, and authored over three dozen books. He also produced a number of satirical paintings under the pseudonym of "Mr. Otis," in a style he called "primitive modern." These paintings are still shown occasionally at the Portland Art Museum or can be found at the University of Washington Libraries, Special Collections. In the early 1960s, Holbrook was the founder and leading spokesperson of an early fictitious conservation movement called the James G. Blaine Society, writing on subjects from sustained yield forestry to his concerns about unplanned population growth.

== Awards and honors ==
The Stewart H. Holbrook Literary Legacy Award is named after Holbrook and is presented every year "to a person or organization in recognition of significant contributions that have enriched Oregon’s literary community."

== Bibliography ==
- Holy Old Mackinaw: A Natural History of the American Lumberjack (1938) ISBN 1-112-55989-2
- Let Them Live (1938)
- Iron Brew: A Century of American Ore and Steel (1939)
- Ethan Allen (1940) ISBN 1-121-69376-8
- Tall Timber (1941)
- Murder Out Yonder: An Informal Study of Certain Classic Crimes in Back-Country America (1941)
- None More Courageous: American War Heroes of Today (1942) ISBN 1-122-08926-0
- A Narrative of Schafer Bros. Logging Company's Half Century in the Timber (1945)
- Burning an Empire: The Study of American Forest Fires (1943)
- Green Commonwealth: A Narrative of the Past and a Look at the Future of One Forest Products Community (1945) ISBN 1-122-25043-6, ISBN 1-127-02722-0
- Promised Land: A Collection of Northwest Writing (1945)
- Lost Men of American History (1946) ISBN 1-299-10049-X, ISBN 1-117-36274-4 ISBN 1-117-51286-X
- The Story of American Railroads (1947) ISBN 1-117-04750-4 ISBN 1-122-15378-3
- Little Annie Oakley & Other Rugged People (1948) ISBN 1-125-58757-1
- (with Henry Sheldon) Northwest Corner: Oregon and Washington: the Last Frontier (1948) ISBN 1-199-18651-1
- with Sheldon, Henry (1948). Northwest Corner: Oregon and Washington: the Last Frontier. ISBN 1-199-18651-1.
- America's Ethan Allen (1949) ISBN 1-112-12168-4
- Yankee Exodus: an Account of Migration (1950) ISBN 1-125-30990-3
- The Portland Story (1951)
- Far Corner: A Personal View of the Pacific Northwest (1952) ISBN 1-199-10824-3
- Saga of the Saw Filer (1952) OCLC 7454191
- (with Ernest Richardson) Wild Bill Hickok Tames the West (1952)
- Age of the Moguls (1985) ISBN 0517556790 (Original work published 1953)
- (with Milton Rugoff) Down on the Farm, A Picture History of Country Life in America in the Good Old Days (1954) ISBN 1-122-18476-X
- James J. Hill: A Great Life in Brief (1955)
- Machines of Plenty: Pioneering in American Agriculture (1955) ISBN 1-117-17900-1 ISBN 1-199-05586-7
- Davy Crockett (1955)
- Wyatt Earp: U.S. Marshall (1956)
- The Columbia (Rivers of America Series) (1956) ISBN 1-117-17992-3
- The Rocky Mountain Revolution (1956) ISBN 1-117-11464-3 ISBN 1-122-05229-4
- Dreamers of the American Dream (1957) ISBN 1-112-13685-1
- (with Ernest Richardson) Swamp Fox of the Revolution (1957) ISBN 1-299-86718-9
- Mr. Otis (1958) ISBN 1-117-37983-3 ISBN 1-199-11100-7
- The Golden Age of Quackery (1959)
- The Golden Age of Railroads (1960)
- Yankee Logger: A Recollection of Woodsmen, Cooks and River Drivers (1961)
- The Old Post Road: The Story of the Boston Post Road (1962)
- (with Nard Jones and Roderick Haig-Brown) The Pacific Northwest (1963) ISBN 1-199-96306-2 ISBN 1-117-12249-2
- The Wonderful West (1963)
- The Columbia River (1965)
- Wildmen, Wobblies & Whistle Punks: Stewart Holbrook's Lowbrow Northwest (1992) - an anthology of his writings. ISBN 0-87071-367-1
