= Elmer Davis =

American journalist and Director of the Office of War Information

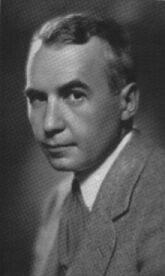
- Born: January 13, 1890; Aurora, Indiana, US
- Died: May 18, 1958 (aged 68); Washington, D.C., US
- Occupations: journalist, Director, Office of War Information, World War II
- Spouse: Florence MacMillan

Elmer Holmes Davis (January 13, 1890 – May 18, 1958) was an American news reporter, author, the Director of the United States Office of War Information during World War II and a Peabody Award recipient.

== Early life and career ==
Davis was born in Aurora, Indiana, the son of a cashier for the First National Bank of Aurora. One of his first professional writing jobs was with the Indianapolis Star, a position he held while attending Franklin College. A brilliant student, Davis received a Rhodes Scholarship to Queen's College, Oxford in 1910. His stay in England was cut short when his father fell ill and eventually died. Davis met his wife, Florence, in England.

Upon his return to America, Davis became an editor for the pulp magazine Adventure, leaving after a year to work as a reporter and editorial writer for The New York Times. For the next decade, Davis reported on stories ranging from pugilist Jack Dempsey to evangelist Billy Sunday. It was his coverage of Billy Sunday that gained him notoriety. Davis later left The New York Times and became a freelance writer.

Davis' best-known work is History of the New York Times, 1851–1921 (New York: The New York Times, 1921).

Davis' 1924 novel I'll Show You the Town was made into a film released in 1925. In 1928 he published the novel Giant Killer, a retelling of the Biblical story of David.

== Radio ==
In August 1939, Paul White, the news chief at CBS, asked Davis to fill in as a news analyst for H. V. Kaltenborn, who was off in Europe reporting on the increasingly hostile events. Davis became an instant success. Edward R. Murrow later commented that one reason he believed that Davis was likeable was his Hoosier accent, which reminded people of a friendly neighbor. By 1941, the audience for Davis' nightly five-minute newscast and comment was 12.5 million.

On June 1, 1941, Colgate-Palmolive-Peet began sponsoring seven-days-a-week newscasts by Davis on CBS. The program was carried on 95 stations from 8:55 to 9 p.m., Eastern Time. Johns Manville also sponsored the broadcasts.

== Office of War Information ==
The easiest way to inject a propaganda idea into most people's minds is to let it go through the medium of an entertainment picture when they do not realize that they are being propagandized.

— Elmer Davis, as qtd. in Hollywood Goes to War

Davis spent two and a half years reporting the news on radio and gaining the trust of the nation. Then, in 1942, President Franklin Delano Roosevelt appointed Davis as the director of the newly created United States Office of War Information, a sprawling organization with over 3,000 employees. Even though Davis was being paid $53,000 per year from CBS, he left the network to work in government during the crisis of World War II.

As Director of the Office of War Information, Davis recommended to Roosevelt that Japanese-Americans be permitted to enlist for service in the Army and Navy and urged him to oppose bills in Congress that would deprive Nisei of citizenship and intern them during the war. He argued that Japanese propaganda proclaiming it a racial war could be combated by deeds that counteracted this. Davis has been termed one of the "unsung forefathers" of the 442nd Regimental Combat Team, an all-Nisei combat unit in the war.

Davis was also instrumental in loosening censorship rules that forbade the publication of images of dead GIs on the battlefield. Until late 1943, the U.S. Office of Censorship permitted the media to publish only images of blanket-covered bodies and flag-draped coffins of dead U.S. soldiers, partly for fear that Americans would be demoralized if they had any graphic understanding of the human price being paid in the war. The government also restricted what reporters could write, and coverage was generally upbeat and bloodless.

Davis believed that the American public "had a right to be truthfully informed" about the war within the dictates of military security. He asked President Roosevelt to lift the ban on publishing photographs of dead GIs on the battlefield on the grounds that the American people needed to appreciate the sacrifices made by their young men. Roosevelt agreed. Life published a photograph taken by George Strock of three American soldiers who were killed on the beach during the Battle of Buna-Gona, the first photograph published that depicted American soldiers dead on the battlefield. Censorship was loosened, but the media was still forbidden from showing the faces of the dead or the insignia of the units they belonged to.

== Postwar career ==
Following the war, Davis continued his career in radio on ABC. Beginning on January 3, 1954, he had a program on ABC Radio on Sundays from 10:15 to 10:30 Eastern Time. Davis used the platform to criticize Senator Joseph McCarthy for his anti-communist investigations.

Davis was one of the four journalists who portrayed themselves in the 1951 film The Day the Earth Stood Still, and he was the host and narrator of the ABC television series, Pulitzer Prize Playhouse (1950–52), which won a Primetime Emmy Award for Outstanding Drama Series. He began a weekly TV commentary program on ABC on January 17, 1954, airing on Sundays from 1 to 1:15 p.m. E. T.

He was a longstanding member of The Baker Street Irregulars, the literary society dedicated to keeping green the memory of Sherlock Holmes.

On June 29, 1952, the Washington Post published a two-page essay by Davis, which he opened by questioning "how long will these former Communists and former sympathizers abuse the patience of the vast majority which had sense enough never to be Communists in the first place?" He cited their "arrogance" as the most "irritating thing" about them. He specifically mentioned Whittaker Chambers, who was then testifying before the Senate Internal Security Subcommittee.

Davis retired from broadcasting in 1953 after suffering a heart attack.

== Death ==
Davis died in May 1958 of complications from a stroke.

== Legacy ==
Davis received many awards, among them three Peabody Awards, including an award during its inaugural year. Foreign governments also recognized Davis when he was inducted into the Dutch Order of Orange-Nassau and the Czechoslovak Order of the White Lion, among others.

In 1946, Davis received the Alfred I. duPont Award.
