= Hildegarde Dolson Lockridge =

American writer (1908–1981)

- Book jacket photograph
- Born: August 31, 1908; Franklin, Pennsylvania
- Died: January 15, 1981 (aged 72); Columbus, North Carolina
- Occupation: Freelance Writer
- Writing career
- Pen name: Hildegarde Dolson
- Genres: Mystery, humorous essays, nonfiction history
- Notable works: We Shook the Family Tree, The Great Oildorado

Hildegarde Dolson Lockridge (1908–1981) was a prolific writer whose career spanned nearly fifty years. Her work appeared in major magazines, plus she was the author of fifteen books—all published under her maiden name of Hildegarde Dolson.

== Early life ==
Hildegarde was born and raised in Franklin, Pennsylvania, the oldest of four children born to Clifford and Katherine Dolson. From 1926 to 1929 she attended Allegheny College, in Meadville, Pennsylvania, but left at the beginning of her senior year to live in New York City. She would later joke: "The day I arrived in New York, in October 1929, the stock market crashed with a bang."

After holding down numerous jobs, Dolson found work as an advertising copywriter for Gimbels, Macy's, Franklin-Simon, and Bamberger stores. She sold her first manuscript to The New Yorker, and was later published in other major magazines, including Harper's, Ladies Home Journal, McCall's, and Reader's Digest. After her first book was published in 1938, Dolson became a full-time freelance writer.

== Marriage to Richard Lockridge ==
Dolson once wrote "I'm a self-made spinster who crows too much about it, especially when I get paid by the word." She had at least one article published on the subject of why she should never marry.

In 1965, when she was 56, she met mystery writer Richard Lockridge, and Lockridge quickly decided he wanted to marry her. Dolson loved her Greenwich Village apartment, and Mr. Lockridge lived in the country. He had two beloved Siamese cats, and she preferred dogs.

Despite the obstacles, within a few months of their first meeting Lockridge and Miss Dolson married in May 1965. Lockridge would refer to Hildegarde as either Hildy, or The Lady.

Hildegarde Dolson Lockridge died on January 15, 1981, at St. Luke's Hospital in Columbus, North Carolina. She was 72 years old, and had been living in Tyron, North Carolina.

== Published books ==
- How About a Man, 1938
- We Shook the Family Tree, 1946
- The Husband Who Ran Away, 1948
- The Form Divine, 1951
- Sorry To Be So Cheerful, 1955
- My Brother Adlai (with Elizabeth Stevenson), 1956
- A Growing Wonder, 1957
- The Great Oildorado: The Gaudy & Turbulent Years of the First Oil Rush: Pennsylvania 1859–1880, 1959
- William Penn, Quaker Hero, 1961
- Guess Whose Hair I'm Wearing, 1963
- Adventures of a Light-Headed Blonde, 1964
- Disaster at Johnstown, The Great Flood, 1965
- Open the Door, 1966
- Heat Lightning, 1970
- To Spite Her Face, 1971
- A Dying Fall, 1973
- Please Omit Funeral, 1975
- Beauty Sleep, 1977
- "How Beautiful With Mud", 1978
