= Clifford Lindsey Alderman =

American writer (1902–1988)

- Born: August 5, 1902; Springfield, Massachusetts, U.S.
- Died: June 14, 1988 (aged 85)
- Education: United States Naval Academy
- Occupation: Writer
- Writing career
- Genres: Historical fiction; non-fiction

Clifford Lindsey Alderman (August 5, 1902 – June 14, 1988) was an American writer of historical fiction and nonfiction for adults and adolescents, best known for young-adult nonfiction.

== Biography ==
Clifford Lindsey Alderman was born in 1902 in Springfield, Massachusetts. He was a direct descendant of John Alden and Priscilla Alden and had two ancestors who fought in the American Revolution. In 1924 he graduated from the United States Naval Academy at Annapolis. He specialized in chemical engineering, and even did a graduate work in this field at the Massachusetts Institute of Technology. After that he served in the navy at Columbia University, Holy Cross College and Millsaps College during World War II. Then he became a commander of an officer training school at Middlebury College in Vermont. When the war finished, he started to work as an editor and did public relations for shipping and foreign trade industries. He lived most of their married life in Seaford, New York, and did weekly research at the New York Public Library. Cliff Alderman died in 1988 at the age of 86.

== Career ==
He started writing when he was a student. He wrote historical novels, both fiction and nonfiction for adults. He wrote under his full name, Clifford Lindsey Alderman. He believed that it was important to visit places he wrote about in his books which is why he and his wife Mildred traveled in their native New England, and took repeated research trips to Canada, England, Ireland, France, and the Caribbean.

== Books ==
- The Arch of Stars (1950)
- To Fame Unknown (1954)
- Joseph Brant: Chief of the Six Nations (1958)
- The Silver Keys (1960)
- Samuel Adams: Son of Liberty (1961)
- Stormy Knight: The Life of Sir William Phip (1964)
- That Men Shall Be Free: The Story of the Magna Charta (1964)
- The Vengeance of Abel Wright (1964)
- Wooden Ships and Iron Men (1964)
- Liberty, Equality, Fraternity: The Story of the French Revolution (1965)
- The Privateers men (1965)
- The Way of the Eagles (1965)
- The Story of the Thirteen Colonies (1966)
- Retreat to Victory: The Life of Nathanael Greene (1967)
- The Devil's Shadow: The Story of Witchcraft in America (1967)
- Death to the King: The Story of the English Civil War (1968)
- Flame of Freedom: The Peasants' Revolt of 1381 (1969)
- The Great Invasion: The Norman Conquest of 1066 (1969)
- The Rhode Island Colony (1969)
- The Royal Opposition: The Story of the British Generals in the American Revolution (1970)
- Gathering Storm: The Story of the Green Mountain Boys (1970)
- Blood-Red the Roses: The Story of the Wars of the Roses (1971)
- A Cauldron of Witches: A Story of Witchcraft (1971)
- The Wearing of the Green: The Irish Rebellion, 1916-1921 (1971)
- The Golden Century: England Under the Tudors (1972)
- Rum, Slaves, and Molasses: The Story of New England's Triangular Trade (1972)
- Osceola and the Seminole Wars (1973)
- The War We Could Have Lost: The American Revolution (1974)
- Witchcraft in America (1974)
- Colonists for Sale: The Story of Indentured Servants in America (1975)
- The Dark Eagle: The Story of Benedict Arnold (1976)
- Symbols of Magic: Amulets and Talismans (1977)
- Annie Oakley and the World of Her Time (1979)
